= Rudi Schneider =

Austrian Spiritualist and physical medium

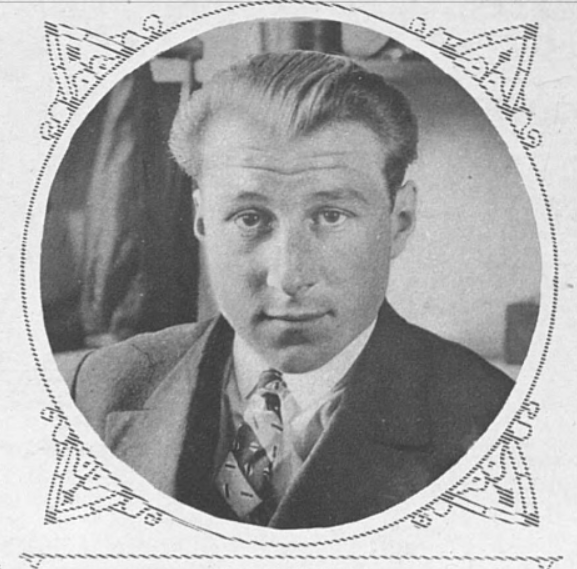
- Born: July 27, 1908; Braunau am Inn, Austria
- Died: April 28, 1957 (aged 48); Weyer, Austria
- Occupations: Mechanic; Physical medium

Rudi Schneider (July 27, 1908 – April 28, 1957), son of Josef Schneider and brother of Willi Schneider, was an Austrian Spiritualist and physical medium. His career was covered extensively by the Journal of the American Society for Psychical Research, and he took part in a number of notable experiments conducted by paranormal researchers/debunkers, including Harry Price, Albert von Schrenck-Notzing and Eric Dingwall. Some of these researchers declared him to be a fraud while others were unable to find evidence of trickery. A detailed biography of Rudi Schneider, presenting rare documents, like diaries kept by his father, was published by Anita Gregory. The author explicitly admits her positive bias.

== Early career ==
Schneider began participating in séances with his elder brother Willi Schneider at age 11. Both Rudi and Willi claimed to channel a spirit entity called "Olga" who in the séance room claimed to be "Lola Montez" the nickname of Eliza Eosanna Gilbert (1821-1861) the mistress of Ludwig I of Bavaria. Schneider held his first solo séance in 1919 and is said to have been able to summon the ghostly image of a human hand, as well as a number of other manifestations that are traditionally associated with séances. Schneider's other brother, Karl, also claimed to be a medium.

== Investigations ==
Schneider began giving demonstrations to the Vienna Institut für Radiumforschung der Akademie der Wissenschaften in 1923. In an investigation into the mediumship of Schneider in 1924 the physicists Stefan Meyer and Karl Przibram caught Schneider evading the controls in a series of séances. After Meyer and Przibram's accusations, the institute concluded that the abilities that Schneider had demonstrated up to that point were all, based on the balance of probability, the result of trickery and that he was no-longer of interest to them.

Between May 8, 1924 and February 1, 1929 Rudi Schneider was mainly investigated by Albert von Schrenck-Notzing, mostly in his lab in Munich. The sittings are documented in his Die Phänomene des Mediums Rudi Schneider (The Phenomena of the Medium Rudi Schneider) published posthumously in 1933, edited by his scientific secretary, the philosopher Dr. Gerda Walther (1897-1977), with a preface by Eugen Bleuler. On November 2, 1924 Thomas Mann attended a sitting and again with his wife Katia Mann on January 24, 1925. On June 21, 1925 there was a sitting in Zurich attended by C. G. Jung, all with good phenomena.

In 1926, American journalist Warren Vinton attended séances with Schneider and came to the conclusion that the movement of objects were fraudulently produced by other members of the Schneider family concealed in the room. In April 1927, Vinton published an article in Psyche which accused Schneider of being a fraud and using a hidden accomplice. Another researcher, J. Malcolm Bird who attended a séance with Schneider also supported Vinton's accusations.

The parapsychologist Walter Franklin Prince attended a series of sittings with Schneider and no paranormal phenomena was observed. In his notes in the Bulletin VII of the Boston SPR published under Experiments with Physical Mediums in Europe (1928) he wrote "despite my studied and unremitting complaisance, no phenomena have occurred when I had any part in the control, save curtain movement which were capable of the simplest explanation." Whilst Prince did not detect any concrete evidence of fraud he found the red light too dim to observe the medium and suspected that Schneider's spirit guide "Olga" insisted the sitters talk loudly to act as a distraction and possible cover for an accomplice in the room.

According to Peter Underwood it was discovered that Schneider had a "sexual climax" during some of his séances. Schneider had an orgasm during some of his mediumship practices. Psychologist D. H. Rawcliffe wrote that Schneider "had been repeatedly and comprehensively exposed" as a fraudulent trickster.

=== Harry Price ===
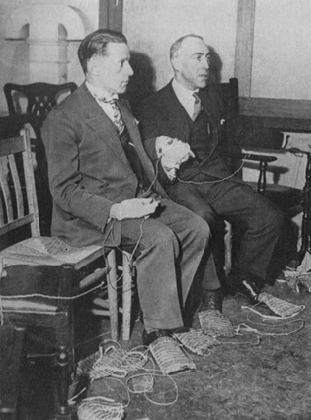
Rudi Schneider (left) with Harry Price (right).

In 1929, Schneider took part in a number of experiments conducted by notable investigator/debunker Harry Price at the National Laboratory of Psychical Research. Price conducted a series of experiments in which Schneider was connected to a series of pressure switches that would alert observers if he moved his hands, feet or limbs in any significant way. Schneider was also physically restrained during some of the experiments. Price recorded that during his experiments various phenomena were observed; including the movement of objects placed around the room and the apparent manifestation of mysterious hands and shapes.

Schneider claimed he could levitate objects but according to Price a photograph taken on April 28, 1932, showed that Schneider had managed to free his arm to move a handkerchief from the table. After this, many scientists considered Schneider to be exposed as a fraud; however, there was a controversy over the photograph from the parapsychology community. Price wrote that the findings of the other experiments should be revised due to the evidence showing how Schneider could free himself from the controls.

After Price had exposed Schneider, various scientists such as Karl Przibram and the magician Henry Evans wrote to Price telling him that they agreed that Schneider evaded control during his séances and congratulated Price on the success of unmasking the fraud. In opposition, SPR members who were highly critical of Price, supported Schneider's mediumship and promoted a conspiracy theory that the Price photograph was a hoax. SPR member Anita Gregory claimed Price had deliberately faked the photograph to discredit SPR research and ruin Schneider's reputation. The psychologist Alan Gauld wrote that Gregory's analysis of the photograph was misconceived and there was no direct evidence the photograph taken by Price had been tampered with. In opposition to Gregory the photographic expert Vernon Harrison testified that the photograph was genuine. Harrison suggested that instead of fraud the shock of the flash caused Schneider to jerk involuntarily breaking free from the control, and when the second flash went off, recorded him in that position. SPR member John L. Randall who reviewed the Price and Schneider case also came to the conclusion the photograph was genuine. However, Randall disagreed with Harrison that Schneider's movement was accidental and wrote the photograph was evidence for Price's claim that Schneider had freed his hand with fraudulent intent.

V. J. Woolley criticized the electronic controls of Price's experiments. He noted they were liable to go wrong such as a broken wire and that they were not fraud proof like Price had claimed. According to Woolley one sitter alone could "free his feet by connecting his metal floor plates by a piece of wire... I do not feel that the electrical control excludes [fraud] any better than the older methods which Mr Price describes as obsolete".

The verdict of 1933 was not to be the last word of Harry Price on the Schneider boys. In his 1939 compendium Fifty Years of Psychical Research he significantly softens his stance, refers to them as the sheet-anchor of psychical research, and views their case quite positively.

=== Eugène Osty ===
In 1930, Schneider began working with French paranormal investigator Eugène Osty at the Institut Métapsychique. Osty placed an object in the room with Schneider and targeted it with a camera that had an infrared trigger designed to take a picture if it detected movement around the object. The alarm was triggered several times though the photographs showed no evidence of Schneider having interfered with it. Osty concluded that he was recording the passage of an ectoplasm like substance that was indicative of telekinetic movement. He wrote that the substance registered on sound recording equipment when it moved, and that it could pass through objects put in place to impede it.

Osty's experiments with Schneider have been criticized by skeptics. D. H. Rawcliffe for example noted that "various discrepancies have come to light which throw the whole of Osty's experiments into doubt. Price made a prolonged investigation of Rudi Schneider and proved conclusively that the medium resorted to trickery when he believed himself to be unobserved... Osty has too often shown in the past, despite some intellectual ability, evidence of an amateurish and uncritical approach to his subject."

=== Other tests ===
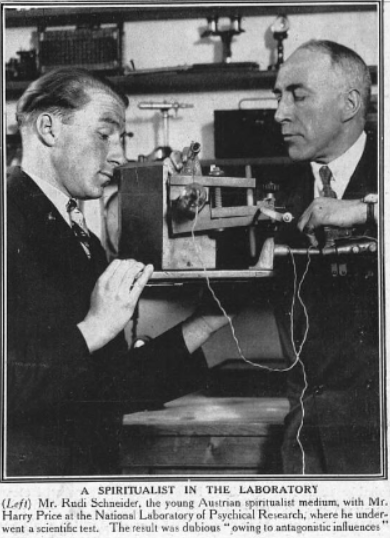
Price testing Rudi Schneider.

In the 1920s Fritz Wittels who had attended séances with Schneider wrote that "With occult waves running high in Vienna, there was a famous medium named Rudi Schneider, a few of whose meetings I attended. Whenever I came, however, either nothing happened at all or the things which did happen were obvious frauds." It was reported by Stefan Meyer that Schneider was exposed as a fraud by Dr. Lothar Lenkei.

In 1928, E. R. Dodds and V. J. Woolley attended six séances in dim red light with Schneider and absolutely no phenomena occurred. Dodds wrote that semen was found after one of the séances.

Between October 4, 1932 and December 16, 1932 the "Hope-Rayleigh experiments" with 27 sittings took place in London and replicated the findings of Osty. They were organized by Lord Charles Hope and supported by Lord Rayleigh.

In a series of mediumship sessions in 1932 which included the researchers and scientists Dr. William Brown, C. E. M. Joad, Professor D. F. Fraser-Harris, Professor John Alexander Gunn and Julian Huxley, no paranormal phenomena was observed in the séance room with Schneider. Huxley wrote that there was "no proof of any communication with departed spirits". Zoologist Solly Zuckerman also attended some séance sittings and wrote that the mediumship of Schneider had not passed any scientific tests.

William Howard Livens on 15 November 1932 attended a séance with Schneider and no paranormal phenomenon was observed.

Between October 1933 and March 1934 Schneider was investigated by the Society for Psychical Research in fifty-five sittings and not a single paranormal phenomenon was observed. Infrared ray apparatus was installed by Oliver Gatty working with Theodore Besterman. The experiments proved negative, no telekinetic phenomena of any kind were observed or any absorption of the infrared rays. Every chance was given to Schneider to prove his alleged paranormal abilities but nothing paranormal occurred. Another researcher, Whately Carington had proven by tests that the spirit "Olga" which Schneider channeled in reality was indistinguishable in psychological make-up from himself. Oliver Gatty and Theodore Besterman communicated their results to Nature, concluding that in their tests there was "no good evidence that Rudi Schneider possesses supernormal powers."

The following final investigations are mentioned in Anita Gregory's biography of Rudi Schneider, pp. 394–403. In early 1935 Rudi Schneider was investigated by the distinguished psychiatrist Professor Oskar Fischer in Prague but all sittings were negative. However Rudi returned to Prague in October 1935 and 5 out of 10 sittings were positive, e.g. with some levitations of a table and the formation of a cloudlike mass of indefinite form. There was one further major investigation of Rudi conducted between November 4, 1935, and June 30, 1936 by the physicist Professor G. A. Schwaiger of the University of Vienna. Some positive results were obtained. An English report exists in the Archives of the SPR, Anita Gregory mentions some more details. Four further sittings took place in London in April 1937 under the direction of Nandor Fodor but no phenomena were observed. This was followed by a short series of sittings held by Lord Charles Hope. A few curtain movements and slight raps were reported.

There were no more investigations as in his later years Schneider gave up mediumship to become an auto mechanic and worked as a driving instructor in Weyer where he lived with his wife Mitzi. He died unexpectedly by a brain hemorrhage on April 28, 1957, aged 48.
