= Lydia W. Allison =

American parapsychologist and writer

Lydia Winterhalter Allison (September 14, 1880 – March 25, 1959), best known as Lydia W. Allison, was an American parapsychologist and writer.

== Biography ==
Allison was born in Milwaukee, Wisconsin. In 1905, she married physician Edward Wood Allison. After the death of her husband in 1920, she became involved in psychical research. She was the Secretary and Assistant Treasurer of the American Society for Psychical Research and Chairman of its Committee of Publications. In 1925, she founded the Boston Society for Psychical Research with Walter Franklin Prince and others.

Allison investigated spiritualist mediums such as Gladys Osborne Leonard and Minnie M. Soule. She authored Leonard and Soule Experiments (1929). Gardner Murphy commented that "Her combination of unfailing enthusiasm for the highest quality research and solid skepticism regarding unsound methods made her a precious collaborator." Psychical researcher G. N. M. Tyrrell wrote that Allison was a "very experienced and scientifically cautious investigator."

== Selected publications ==
- Leonard and Soule Experiments in Psychical Research (Boston Society for Psychical Research, 1929) [with Walter Franklin Prince]
