= Henry C. McComas =

American psychologist (1875–1958)

Henry Clay McComas (December 21, 1875 – December 15, 1958) was an American psychologist and skeptic.

== Biography ==
McComas was born December 21, 1875, in Baltimore. He achieved his bachelor's degree at Johns Hopkins University in 1897, his Masters at Columbia University in 1898 and his Ph.D. at Harvard University in 1910. He worked as an assistant professor of psychology at Princeton University, he was also an editor for the Psychological Index.

McComas was a member of the American Society for Psychical Research, and took interest in exposing the fraud and trickery of mediums. He investigated William Cartheuser and Mina Crandon and concluded they were both fraudulent.

In his book Ghosts I Have Talked With (1937), McComas described his experiences in investigating spiritualism. His results were entirely negative. He found that chance, fraud or malobservation could explain all the phenomena.

He died at his home in Gulfport, Florida, on December 15, 1958. He was buried in Baltimore.

== Publications ==
- Some Types of Attention (1911)
- The Psychology of Religious Sects: Comparison of Types (1912)
- Apparatus for Recording Continuous Discrimination Reactions (1917)
- The Aviator (1922)
- Ghosts I Have Talked With (1937)
- The McComas Saga: A Family History Down to the Year 1950 (1950)
