= J. Malcolm Bird =

American mathematician and parapsychologist

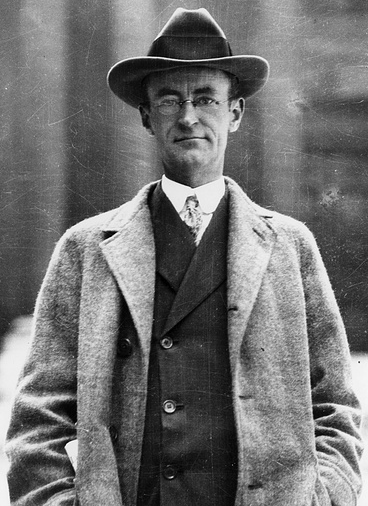
- Born: James Malcolm Bird; September 2, 1886; Brooklyn, New York
- Died: October 30, 1964 (aged 78); Brooklyn, New York
- Occupations: Mathematician, editor, parapsychologist

Academic work
- Discipline: Mathematics
- Institutions: Columbia University

James Malcolm Bird (September 2, 1886 – October 30, 1964) was an American mathematician and parapsychologist.

== Career ==
Bird was born in Brooklyn to James Gedney Bird and Eliza (Baltz) Bird on September 2, 1886. He trained in mathematics and taught as a Professor at Columbia University, he later became an associate editor for the Scientific American, upon quitting in 1925 he became the research officer of the American Society for Psychical Research (ASPR) from 1925–1931.

Bird investigated spiritualist mediums such as Mina Crandon, John C. Sloan, Gladys Osborne Leonard, William Hope and Maria Vollhardt. His experiences are mentioned in his book My Psychic Adventures (1924). Bird has drawn criticism from magician Harry Houdini and the psychical researcher Walter Franklin Prince for his conduct in the investigation of Mina Crandon. Houdini and Prince strongly suspected that Crandon was fraudulent, but Bird had endorsed some of her phenomena as genuine. In December, 1930 Bird was compelled to resign from the ASPR after he admitted he had known of fraudulent activity regarding Crandon from the start.

Walter Franklin Prince considered Bird "totally unreliable". The Society for Psychical Research's Honorary Research Officer V. J. Woolley noted that Bird was an inaccurate reporter, he had made factual errors about a séance sitting in 1923. Historian Ruth Brandon has described Bird as a biased and unreliable witness. More recently, authors William Kalush and Larry Sloman have suggested that Bird had conspired with Crandon in "stage managing the séances and achieving a positive vote from the majority of the committee." Bird died October 30, 1964.

== Gallery ==
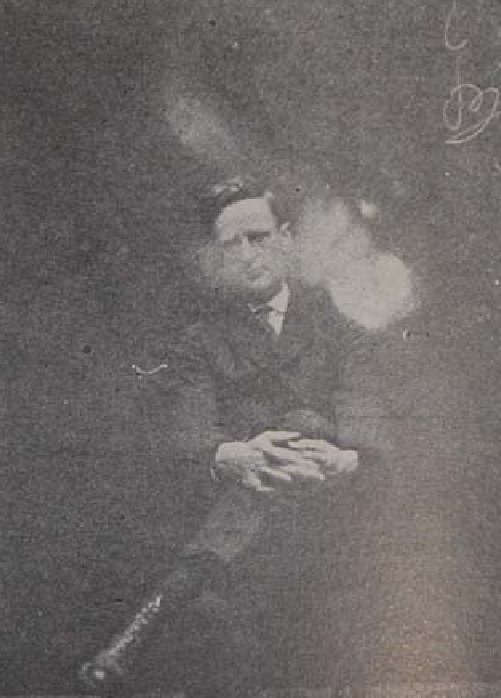
Fraudulent "spirit" photograph featuring Malcolm Bird, taken by William Hope

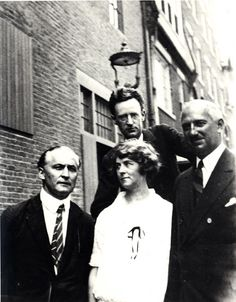
Harry Houdini (left), Malcolm Bird (back), Mina Crandon (middle), O. D. Munn (right)

== Publications ==
- Einstein's Theories of Relativity and Gravitation (1922) New York: Scientific American Pub. Co. OCLC 877921
- My Psychic Adventures (1924) New York: Scientific American Pub. Co. OCLC 594157
- Margery the Medium (1925) Boston: Small, Maynard & Company OCLC 549546
