= William Cartheuser =

American medium (1890–1966)

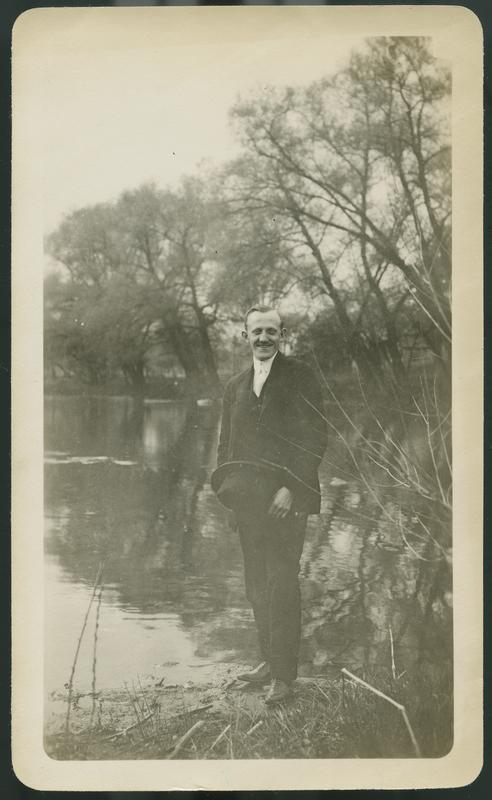
- Cartheuser (ca. 1927-1935)
- Born: January 19, 1890
- Died: February 25, 1966 (aged 76); Los Angeles, California, US
- Occupation: Spiritualist

William Cartheuser (January 19, 1890 – February 25, 1966) was an American spiritualist medium.

== Career ==
Cartheuser originally worked as a mechanic. He became a direct-voice medium who had utilized trumpets in his séances. He was investigated by members of the American Society for Psychical Research. In 1927, he held a séance with Nandor Fodor in New York. Psychical researchers suspected Cartheuser was fraudulent.

In 1928, he conducted séances with the spiritualist Jenny O'Hara Pincock in Ontario, Canada. Pincock originally endorsed Cartheuser as a genuine medium but later broke connections, suggesting that he had turned his mediumship into a financial scheme.

Cartheuser was investigated by the psychical researcher Hereward Carrington. He concluded that "a high percentage of fraud enters into the production of Cartheuser's physical phenomena."

Psychologist Henry C. McComas who observed Cartheuser at many sittings, detected his trickery. Cartheuser would get up from his chair, move the trumpets and produce all the voices himself.

== Death ==
Cartheuser died February 25, 1966, in Los Angeles, California.
