= Maria Silbert =

Austrian spiritualist medium

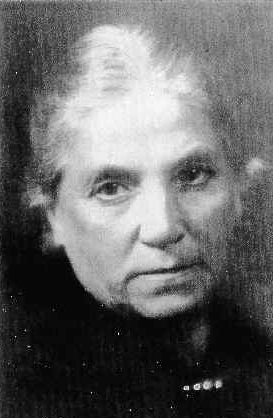
Maria Silbert

Frau Maria Silbert (1866–1936) was an Austrian spiritualist medium.

== Biography ==
Silbert was born in Waltendorf, Graz and claimed powers of apportation and psychokinesis as well as the ability to produce "spirit raps". Her famous trick was to engrave cigarette cases under the table during her séances. She allowed some lighting in her séances but did not allow investigators to look under the table where most of her phenomena was said to occur.

Adalbert Evian supported Silbert and wrote the book The Mediumship of Maria Silbert (1936). The psychical researcher Eric Dingwall in a review wrote that "as a work of scientific interest it is worthless, but as illustrating the minds of those over whom Frau Silbert cast her influence it is by no means without value."

== Investigations ==
In 1925, the British psychical researcher Harry Price investigated Silbet and caught her using her feet and toes to move objects in the séance room.

Walter Franklin Prince in 1927 discovered how Silbert performed the cigarette trick. She had developed the ability to maneuver a stiletto using only her feet and was thus able to write names on the cigarette cases when they were held under the table. Another researcher Theodore Besterman investigated Silbert in 1928 and observed that the "spirit raps" only occurred when Silbert had her legs under the table or in front of the chair which suggested that she tapped the furniture herself with her feet to make the sounds.
