= Operation Junkyard =

- Created by: Malcolm Bird; Kathy Rogers
- Written by: Malcolm Bird
- Directed by: Grazia Caroselli; Kris Curry; Malcolm Bird; Patrick Doody; Chris Valenziano
- Presented by: Rob Czar; Kamaya Jones; Clinton McLean; Michelle Armitage
- Country of origin: United States
- Original language: English
- No. of seasons: 1
- No. of episodes: 12

Production
- Executive producer: Jim Rapsas
- Producer: Malcolm Bird
- Running time: 30 minutes
- Production companies: Discovery Kids; RDF Media LA

Original release
- Network: Discovery Kids
- Release: 5 October 2002 – 15 February 2003

Operation Junkyard is an American television series that aired from October 5, 2002 to February 15, 2003 on Discovery Kids. Essentially a spin-off of TLC's popular series Junkyard Wars, OP/JY featured teams of teens that were challenged to build gadgets out of junk in six hours. Teams featured on the show include the Rummaging Robots and Jurassic Junkers, and the teams were tasked to build gadgets like water bailing machines, mud scooters, and remote control battleships.

== Premise ==
At the beginning of each show the challenge of the day was revealed and teams attempted to collect "bodgits" by completing small challenges. "Bodgits" were helpful advantages that teams could earn, including time with the on-set engineer or special parts for use in their build. Two identical school buses filled with junk were given to the teams, who had six hours to create their contraptions.

== Teams ==
Team name
Jurassic Junkers
Banging Builders
Rummaging Robots
Scrap Scavengers
Scrap Heap Henchmen
Gearhead Gremlins
Garbage Gorillas
Renegade Recyclers
Junkyard Jugglers
Funky Junkers
Raging Racers
Demolition Dudes

== Episodes ==
#	Gadget Made
1	Catapult
2	Water Bailer
3	Water Bike
4	Cannon
5	Baseball Pitcher
6	Master Water Blaster
7	Go Cart
8	Mechanical Crane
9	Ice Drag Racer
10	Mud Scooter
11	Pie Filling Machine
12	Battleship

== Reception ==
In a positive review, The San Diego Union-Tribune television critic Roshni Kakaiya wrote, "I really recommend this show to everyone, even younger kids. The story has a lot of meaning. If I could rate this on a scale of colors, black being the worst and gold being the best, I would rate this show silver." Calling the show "entertaining and educational", The Dallas Morning News's Jeanne Spreier gave it an A-minus, writing that it "gets high marks for all sorts of reasons, not the least of which is using words such as release valve, psi gauge and propulsion—and making them synonymous with fun".
