= Pierre L. O. A. Keeler =

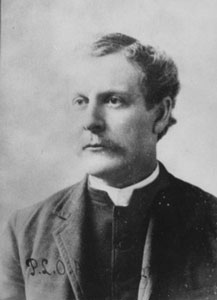
Pierre L. O. A. Keeler

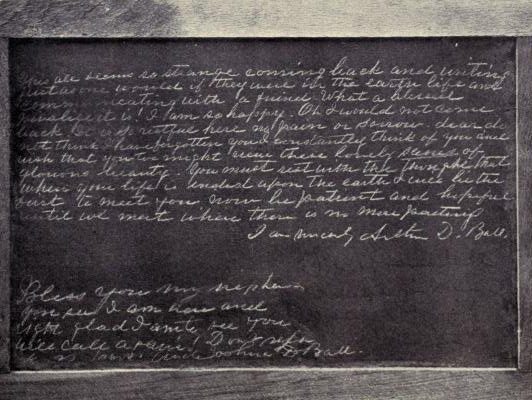
Example of slate-writing.

Pierre Louis Ormond Augustus Keeler (1855-1942), best known as Pierre L. O. A. Keeler, was an American spiritualist medium.

== Career ==
Keeler was best known for his materialization, pellet-reading, and slate-writing mediumship. He was investigated in 1885 by the Seybert Commission, which suspected his phenomena was fraudulent.

The magician Henry R. Evans sat with Keeler in April 1895 and suspected that he had written the 'spirit' messages on the slates himself. According to Evans "I was sure he was writing under the table; I heard the faint rubbing of a soft bit of pencil upon the surface of a slate... several times I saw him put his fingers into his vest pockets, and he appeared to bring up small particles of something, which I believe were bits of the white and coloured crayons used in writing the messages."

Psychical researcher Hereward Carrington, who visited Keeler at Lily Dale in 1907, caught him cheating by substituting slates and commented "for not only did I see Keeler make the exchange, but the slates I received at the conclusion of the seance were different from those I examined... Keeler is a clever trickster, and the degree of perfection he has attained certainly seems to indicate that he must have been in the habit of practising these tricks continuously for a number of years."

He was exposed as a fraud by the magician Harry Houdini, who had his niece Julia Sawyer attend a séance. During the séance she invented a non-existent sister and spoke of deceased relatives who were alive. Keeler, unaware of the trap, claimed to 'channel' the spirits of the sister and relatives. He was also exposed by the psychical researcher Walter Franklin Prince, who made comparisons of the 'spirit' messages to the handwriting of the deceased to discover they were inaccurate.

Keeler was once arrested in New York City for giving fake materialization séances. He was chased by the police and escaped out of a window but was eventually arrested.

== Lincoln slate ==
Keeler was alleged to have channelled the spirit of Abraham Lincoln by producing a signed message on a slate. The slate is located at the Lily Dale Museum. Skeptical investigator Joe Nickell, who made a detailed examination of the slate, concluded it had no resemblance to Lincoln's handwriting and described the message as "bogus".

== William M. Keeler ==
Keeler's brother William was a medium and spirit photographer. He was also exposed as a fraud by Walter Franklin Prince.
