= Carmine Mirabelli =

Italian spiritualist (1889–1951)

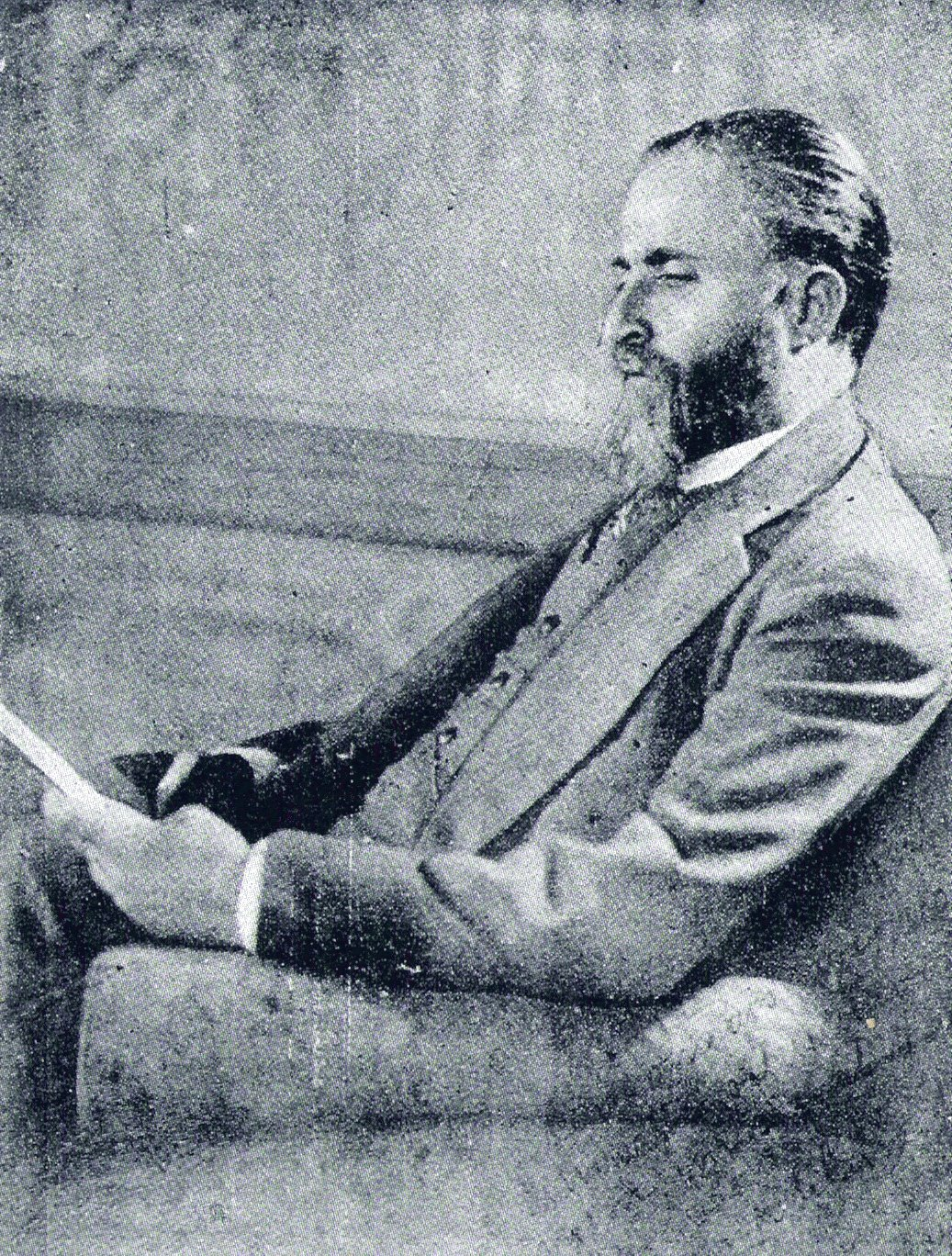
Carlos Mirabelli

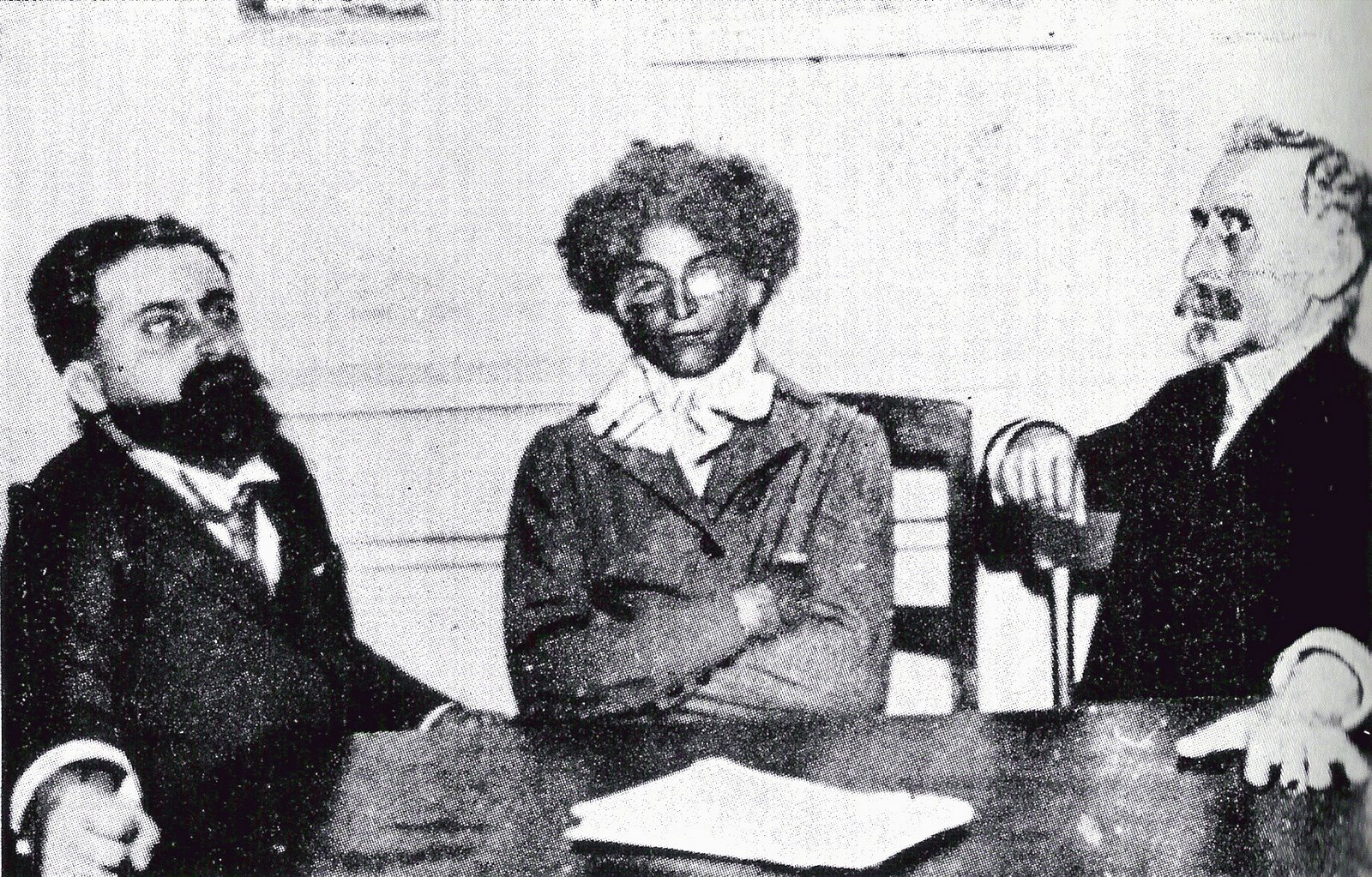
Mirabelli (left) with alleged 'materialization' (middle).

Carmine Carlos Mirabelli (2 January 1889 – 30 April 1951) was a Brazilian physical medium and Spiritualist.

== Biography ==
Mirabelli was born in Botucatu, São Paulo, Brazil, of Italian parents. He studied Spiritism at an early age and was introduced to the writings of Allan Kardec. As a teenager he worked in a shoe shop and claimed to have experienced poltergeist activity where shoe boxes would literally fly off the shelves. He was placed in a lunatic asylum for observation and psychologists said there was something wrong with him, but he was not physically sick. Mirabelli later became a medium and it was alleged he could produce automatic handwriting, materializations of objects and people (ectoplasm), levitations and movement of objects.

In the 1920s, Mirabelli was tested by the Academia de Estudos Psychicos Cesare Lombroso in São Paulo and a report published in 1926 wrote that in more than 300 sittings genuine materializations had been observed. When the report was published in English, it was challenged by various psychical researchers. In 1928, the German scientist Hans Driesch investigated Mirabelli and found that some objects had been moved in the séance room but that there was no evidence for his supposed abilities of materialization or apportation. Mirabelli later began giving public mediumship demonstrations which were described as theatrical displays. Throughout his life Mirabelli had been involved with 15 lawsuits for the illegal practice of witchcraft. He was suspected of utilizing tricks.

It was alleged that Mirabelli could move bottles of magnetized water on a table without contact with them. This was disputed by Antônio da Silva Mello who noted that such a trick could have been performed "by means of a thread led to the table or by several other means, principally by the help of a partner who in this particular case was suspected by several persons present to be the medium's wife."

== Society for Psychical Research Investigation ==
In 1934 Theodore Besterman, a research officer for the Society for Psychical Research, visited Brazil to investigate Mirabelli. He discovered that some of the witness reports from the Academia de Estudos Psychicos Cesare Lombroso were unreliable and it was not an independent organization but one that was associated with Mirabelli and his personal friends. Whilst investigating the séances, Besterman claimed to have detected trickery.

== Levitation trick ==
In 1990, Dr. Gordon Stein found a levitation photograph of Mirabelli in the Society for Psychical Research (SPR) collection at the Cambridge University Library. It was inscribed by Mirabelli to Besterman from his visit in 1934. The levitation in the photograph was discovered to be a trick as there were signs of chemical retouching under Mirabelli's feet. The retouching showed that Mirabelli was not levitating but was standing on a ladder which was erased from the photograph.

According to Stein:

The fact that the fraudulent photo has been inscribed by Mirabelli to Besterman means that Mirabelli, then at the very peak of his powers was at least in pan, a fraud. He knowingly passed off a fraudulent photo of himself as authentic. It should make us cautious about accepting hearsay statements of Mirabelli's followers about the many wonders he had performed. More importantly, it should make us very cautious about accepting at face value other photographs of Mirabelli's marvels.
