= Thomas Balogh, Baron Balogh =

Hungarian-British economist and nobleman

The Right Honourable The Lord Balogh
- Baron Balogh in 1969

Chairman of the Fabian Society
- In office 1969–1970
- Preceded by: Peter Shore
- Succeeded by: Jeremy Bray

Personal details
- Born: Balog Tamás; 2 November 1905 Budapest, Austria-Hungary
- Died: 20 January 1985 (aged 79) London, England
- Spouses: Penelope Gatty (m. 1945; div. 1970) Catherine Storr (m. 1970)
- Occupation: Economist

Thomas Balogh, Baron Balogh (2 November 1905 – 20 January 1985), born Balog Tamás, was a British economist and member of the House of Lords.

The elder son of a wealthy Budapest Jewish family (his father was head of public transport, his mother the daughter of a professor), Balogh studied at the Minta Gymnasium, considered 'the Eton of Hungarian youth', then at the universities of Budapest and Berlin. He took a two-year research position at Harvard University as a Rockefeller Fellow in 1928. Following this, Balogh worked in banking in Paris, Berlin and Washington before coming to England.

After getting British citizenship in 1938, he became a lecturer at Balliol College, Oxford, and was elected to a Fellowship in 1945, then became Reader in 1960. He was also the economic correspondent for the New Statesman, an economic adviser to Harold Wilson's Cabinet office following the 1964 Labour Party victory, and member of the Secretariat of the League of Nations.

As an advisor in the Cabinet Office after 1964, Balogh was a critic of consumption- and profit-orientated tax policies, arguing that "profit can be earned not merely by satisfying long felt wants more efficiently and in a better fashion, but also by creating new wants through artificially engendered satisfaction and the suggestion of status symbols", instead arguing that nationalisation was a better means of securing wage restraint and a more equitable tax system as a whole. Balogh was opposed to Britain's entry of the EEC.

Balogh was created a Life Peer as Baron Balogh, "of Hampstead in Greater London" on 20 June 1968.

Brian Harrison recorded an oral history interview with Balogh, in May 1977, as part of the Suffrage Interviews project, titled Oral evidence on the suffragette and suffragist movements: the Brian Harrison interviews. In the interview Balogh talks about his friendship with Eva Hubback.

He was married twice: firstly in 1945 to Penelope Noel Mary Ingram Tower (daughter of Rev. Henry Bernard Tower, Vicar of Swinbrook, Oxfordshire, and widow of Oliver Gatty, a Balliol Fellow, by whom she had a daughter, Tirril), (1916-1975), a psychotherapist, with whom he had two sons and a daughter; secondly in 1970 to Catherine (née Cole, previously married to Anthony Storr), a psychiatrist and author.

== Major works ==
- The Dollar Crisis (1949)
- The Economics of Poverty (1970)
- The Irrelevance of Conventional Economics (1982)

== Biographies ==
- The Life and Times of Thomas Balogh: A Macaw Among Mandarins, June Morris (Sussex Academic Press, 2007).

Party political offices
Preceded by Peter Shore	Chairman of the Fabian Society; 1969 – 1970	Succeeded by Jeremy Bray
