= Whately Carington =

British parapsychologist

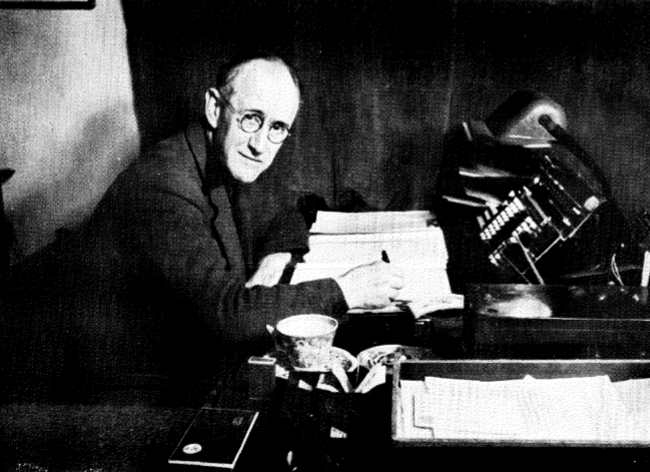
- Born: 1892
- Died: March 2, 1947 (aged 54–55)
- Occupations: Parapsychologist, writer

Walter Whately Carington (1892 – March 2, 1947) was a British parapsychologist. His name, originally Walter Whately Smith, was changed in 1933.

== Biography ==
Carington born in London was educated at the University of Cambridge where he studied science. He was admitted to Middle Temple on 8 November 1912, but withdrew in 1916 without being Called to the Bar. He joined the Royal Flying Corps during World War I and became an experienced pilot, but was badly injured after a forced landing. On behalf of the Air Ministry and War Office he returned to Cambridge to undertake research into acoustics, with special reference to psychological problems. At this time he devised some innovative methods for the mathematical assessment of feelings, which proved useful in his later work.

He investigated the mediums Kathleen Goligher and Gladys Osborne Leonard and he set about studying psychical research in more detail. Between 1934 and 1936 Carington tested the trance mediumship of Eileen Garrett, Gladys Osborne Leonard and Rudi Schneider with psychogalvanic reflex and word association tests. Carington concluded from the results their trance controls were secondary personalities, not spirits.

Criticism of Carington's tests on mediums came from C. D. Broad and R. H. Thouless who wrote he had made statistical errors and misinterpreted numerical data. The psychologist Donald West had praised the tests that Carington performed with Leonard.

Carington gave up all other work for his interest in psychical research. He lived on a small private income for a time in a remote village in the Netherlands. In 1938 he travelled to Germany, to rescue a woman from harassment by the Gestapo. They later married and set up home in Cornwall, where his wife collaborated in his experiments and nursed him as his health gradually failed. His early death at the age of fifty-four was due in part to his injury during World War I, and to overwork.

The psychical researcher Renée Haynes described Carington as a "shy, dedicated retiring man, whose services to psychical research have never been fully recognized."

== Hypotheses ==
Carington theorised that individual minds are less isolated from one another than is assumed. Carington's hypothesis of telepathy was to draw upon the association of ideas: in a mind, one idea yields to another through associative links. Carington hypothesized that telepathy depends upon an analogous type of linkage at a subconscious level. He suggested that such links could perhaps be reinforced by what he called 'K’ ideas or objects. Carington speculated on the concept of a "group mind" and "psychons". He believed that minds which hold a great deal of their images in common may be favourable for telepathic communication.

Carington wrote about his hypothesis in his book Telepathy (1945). The book received a positive review in the British Medical Journal which described it as an "extremely interesting and, though often highly speculative, a thought-provoking book." However Frank Finger gave the book a negative review in The Quarterly Review of Biology claiming Carington failed to present any scientific data that could be intelligently evaluated and concluded "it seems doubtful that this book will alter the scientific status of telepathic communication appreciably, and certainly it will cause no great upheaval in the field of biological science."

Carington's ideas about telepathy inspired the novelist Iris Murdoch who wrote "His theory, though wrong I've no doubt, is interesting."

The philosopher Antony Flew wrote the verdict seemed to go against Carington's hypothesis because it "commits him to saying that the various sub-laws of association (those of Recency, Repetition, etc.) will apply to telepathic association also."

Carington in his book Matter, Mind, and Meaning (1949) advocated a form of neutral monism. He held that mind and matter both consist of the same kind of components known as "cognita" or sense data.

== Publications ==
Books

- The Foundations of Spiritualism (1920)
- A Theory of the Mechanism of Survival (1920)
- The Measurement of Emotion (1922)
- The Death of Materialism (1932)
- Three Essays on Consciousness (1934)
- Telepathy: An Outline of its Fact, Theory and Implications (1945)
- Matter, Mind and Meaning (1949). Completed by H. H. Price.

Papers

- – (1934). The Quantitative Study of Trance Personalities. Part 1. Preliminary Studies. Mrs. Garrett, Rudi Schneider, Mrs. Leonard. Proceedings of the Society for Psychical Research 42: 173–240.
- – (1935). The Quantitative Study of Trance Personalities. Part 2. Proceedings of the Society for Psychical Research 43: 319–361.
- – (1936). The Quantitative Study of Trance Personalities. Part 3. Proceedings of the Society for Psychical Research 44: 189–222.

== See also ==
- Gardner Murphy
