= Oliver Gatty =

British chemist and parapsychologist (1907–1940)

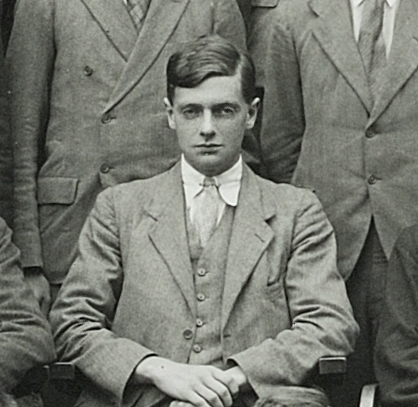
- Born: 5 November 1907; Kensington, Middlesex, England
- Died: 5 June 1940 (aged 32); Cambridge, Cambridgeshire, England
- Occupations: Chemist, psychical researcher

Oliver Gatty (5 November 1907 – 5 June 1940) was a British chemist and psychical researcher.

== Career ==
Gatty was born in Kensington, Middlesex. He was the second child and first son of Stephen Herbert Gatty and his second wife, Katharine Morrison, daughter of Alfred Morrison. He worked at Rothamsted Experimental Station and then under Eric Rideal, Professor of Colloid Science at University of Cambridge. He also worked with James Gray in the Department of Zoology at Cambridge.

He worked at the Chemical Warfare Experimental Establishment at Porton Down. He conducted experiments for the Ministry of Supply into gas mask smoke filters and smoke screening techniques.

Gatty was a member of the Society for Psychical Research. With Theodore Besterman, he investigated the medium Rudi Schneider in a series of experiments. The results were entirely negative. Gatty was skeptical of the claims of dowsing. In 1938, he examined ten cases and concluded that "all the reliable experimental evidence shows that dowsers cannot find hidden things by means other than the use of their five senses."

He died in Cambridge on 5 June 1940 as a result of injuries sustained in a gas explosion accident.

== Personal life ==
He married Penelope Noel Mary Ingram Tower (1916 - 1975) in January 1939. Their only child, Tirril Olivia, was born in July 1940, a month after Gatty's death. Gatty's widow later married Thomas Balogh, Baron Balogh, although this marriage ended in divorce. Nevertheless she founded British Association of Psychotherapists[ref}. Tirril grew up to become the psychologist, Tirril Harris, well known for her groundbreaking research on womens' depresssion.

== Publications ==
- Gatty, Oliver; Besterman, Thedore (1934). Report of an Investigation Into the Mediumship of Rudi Schneider. Proceedings of the Society for Psychical Research 42: 251–285.
- Gatty, Oliver; Besterman, Thedore (1934). Investigation of Paraphysical Phenomena. Nature 133: 569–570.
- Gatty, Oliver; Besterman, Thedore (1934). Further Tests of the Medium Rudi Schneider. Nature 134: 965–966.
- Gatty, Oliver. (1938). Science and Dowsers. Discovery: The Popular Journal of Knowledge 1 (6): 265-268.
