= Seybert Commission =

The Seybert Commission was a group of faculty members at the University of Pennsylvania who in 1884–1887 investigated a number of respected Spiritualist mediums, uncovering fraud or suspected fraud in every case that they examined.

== Establishment of the Commission ==
An ardent believer in Spiritualism, Henry Seybert left in his will funds for the establishment of an endowed chair in Philosophy at the University of Pennsylvania. As a condition to this bequest, he required that the university set up a commission to investigate "all systems of Morals, Religion, or Philosophy which assume to represent the Truth, and particularly of Modern Spiritualism." Ten men served on the commission, all of whom declared themselves at the outset to either be neutral or favorably disposed toward Spiritualism. Among the more notable members were the University Provost William Pepper (a physician), the paleontologist Joseph Leidy, the Shakespearean scholar Horace Howard Furness (who served as the chairman), and the physician and writer Silas Weir Mitchell. Also on the commission was George Augustus Koenig, a chemist. A committed Spiritualist and close friend of Henry Seybert, Thomas Hazard, served as counselor, suggesting particular topics and mediums that should be investigated.

== Slate writing ==
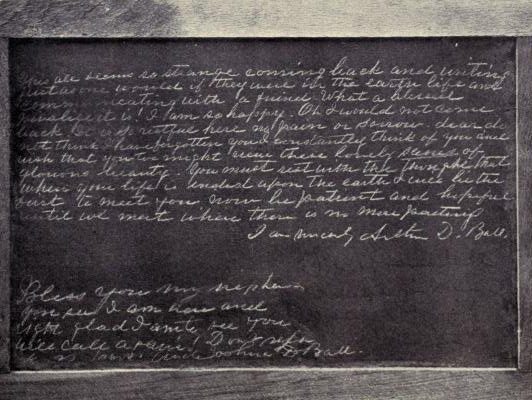
Example of slate-writing.

The topic most conclusively investigated was "slate writing," in which the medium has two slates fastened together, so that the writing surfaces faced each other, out of reach of the medium, with a small piece of pencil between the two slates. The medium holds the slates in her lap, and spirits purportedly write on the slates, sending the pencil outside the slates when finished. The Commission investigated Mrs. S.E. Patterson and Dr. Henry Slade, both widely respected practitioners of slate writing. Mrs. Patterson proved unable to perform when under the scrutiny of the commission, while Dr. Slade was found to be practicing fraud: either composing long, well-written messages before the séance, or loosening the screws holding the slates together and scrawling nearly illegible messages while holding the slates in his lap. The commission also requested that a "professional juggler" attempt slate writing, and found that he was able to provide demonstrations "much more remarkable" than the "puerile" attempts at fraud by Dr. Slade. The Commission concluded that slate writing

"is performed in a manner so closely resembling fraud as to be indistinguishable from it. It would be a mere matter of opinion that all Independent Slate Writing is fraudulent; what is not a matter of opinion is the conviction, which we have unanimously reached as a Commission, of its non-spiritual character in every instance that has come before us."

== Spirit rappings ==
The commission also investigated "rappings", without coming to final conclusions. A thorough investigation of rappings required monitoring the medium's body closely to determine if the sound was caused by "voluntary muscular action." Such monitoring was "a matter of delicacy," and therefore difficult to accomplish. Nevertheless, the commission was able to determine "that the Mediums were invariably, and confessedly, cognizant of the rappings whenever they occurred, and could at once detect any spurious rappings, however exact and indistinguishable to all other ears might be the imitation." This finding suggested that the medium, rather than spirits, were the source of the rappings.

== Movement of objects ==
The commission investigated the physical mediumship of Pierre L. O. A. Keeler which involved the movement of musical instruments such as a guitar and a tambourine. The phenomena were suspected of being fraudulent, in most cases achieved if Keeler had been able to get his arm free from control.

== Spirit photography ==
The Commission attempted to examine a famed "spirit photographer," William M. Keeler.

Spirit photography, in the 1880s, was much like conventional portrait photography, except that the developed plates would show shadowy figures, usually identified by the subject as deceased loved ones. Mr. Keeler demanded such a high fee and imposed so many conditions on the Commission that they concluded that he was unwilling to be examined and that investigating him would be a waste of time. The Commission noted that "In these days of 'Composite Photography' it is worse than childish to claim a Spiritual source for results which can be obtained at any time by any tyro in the art."

== The Report ==
The Commission published a report in 1887 entitled Preliminary Report of the Commission Appointed by the University of Pennsylvania to Investigate Modern Spiritualism In Accordance with the Request of the Late Henry Seybert, in which it expressed:

"...our regret that thus far we have not been cheered in our investigations by the discovery of a single novel fact; but, undeterred by this discouragement, we trust with your permission to continue them with what thoroughness our future opportunities may allow, and with minds as sincerely and honestly open, as heretofore, to conviction."

The report was published by J.B. Lippincott, and angrily denounced by Spiritualists. There proved to be no sentiment for the commission's continued existence, and it quietly disbanded.

== Significance ==
A number of independent investigators examined the claims of Spiritualists in the Nineteenth Century. The Seybert Commission stands as an example of reputable and impartial investigators concluding that Spiritualist mediums were engaging in fraud. The report's appendices provide a good primary source describing how Spiritualist mediums operated in the mid-1880s.
