= Willi Schneider =

Austrian deceiver (1903–1971)

Willi Schneider (1903 – 1971), brother of Rudi Schneider, was an Austrian medium exposed as a fraud.

His physical mediumship was investigated by notable psychical researchers such as Harry Price, Albert von Schrenck-Notzing and Eric Dingwall, the Research Officer of the Society for Psychical Research. Willi, like his brother Rudi, was also caught cheating in the séance room. Warren Vinton, who investigated Rudi, also attended sittings with Willi in 1926. According to Vinton there was movement of some curtains and a sheet of paper which were performed by Willi's blowing.

Author Roy Stemman documented a picture of Willi in a séance with a "faked cloth phantom".
