= Voltaire's letters =

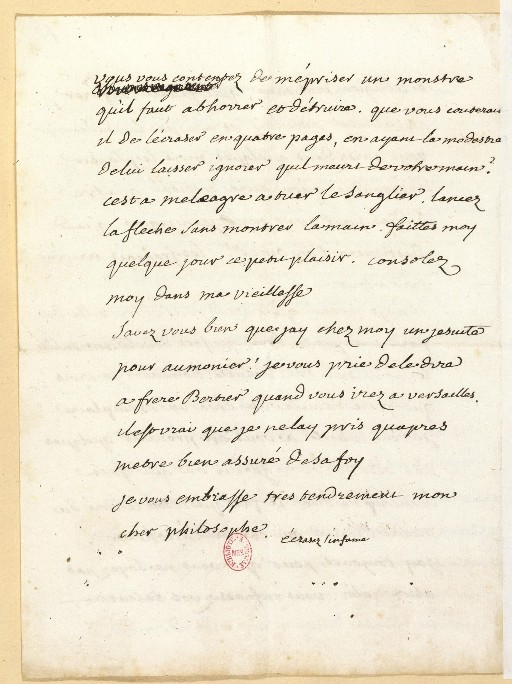
Letter of 28 September 1763 containing the famous phrase Écrasez l'infâme! (Crush the infamous!)

The letters of Voltaire number more than 15,000 written to approximately 1,400 correspondents. They span almost 75 years, from 1704, when Voltaire was 10 years old, to 1778, the year of his death. Addressed to monarchs, friends, family and philosophers, they document the life, thought and work of a key figure of the Enlightenment. They have been called "a feast not only of wit and eloquence but of warm friendship, humane feeling, and incisive thought."

== Corpus ==
The corpus of letters is a heterogeneous and incomplete collection, with uncertain outlines, the product of the vagaries of preservation and the contingencies of publication, permanently incomplete, definitively unfinished. The quality of the sources is also very uneven: manuscripts partially or entirely in Voltaire's hand, manuscripts in the hand of secretaries, more or less late copies, contemporary or posthumous printed editions.

Today, we know of 350 letters to Frederick II of Prussia, 1,200 letters to Charles-Augustin de Ferriol d'Argental (the "Parisian angel" always ready to do favours), 350 letters to d'Alembert, 650 letters to Madame Denis, his niece, governess, and heiress, and 160 letters to Madame du Deffand. However, only 16 letters to Diderot, and 10 from Diderot to Voltaire, are known. Also missing are the correspondence with Madame du Châtelet, probably burned by her family, and the actual holograph letters sent from Prussia to Madame Denis, but retrieved by Voltaire upon his return and published by him under the title Paméla.

The number of letters preserved varies considerably over the years: for the period 1704–1734, it is barely over 500; for the period 1734–1739, a little over 2,100; while for the years 1773 or 1776 alone, it reaches 400 or 500. This number is proportional to the number of Voltaire's relationships and activities, and undoubtedly also to his growing fame, which increasingly encouraged recipients to carefully preserve the originals and their friends to make copies. The recipients were French, English, German, Russian, Italian, Swedish, etc. They included relatives, society people, monarchs, princes, and ministers. With some the correspondence lasted almost a lifetime. With others it was sporadic.

The sheer volume of letters and petitions addressed to him as a champion of reason and advocate for the disenfranchised and persecuted cost the poet-philosopher a small fortune, since the recipient of mail had to pay the postage at that time. In 1769, Voltaire wrote to D'Argental that he could not be the Don Quixote of all those broken on the wheel and hanged. Year after year, more letters to or from Voltaire are discovered. As early as 1953 the Voltaire scholar René Pomeau prophesied that "letters from Voltaire will be published until the Last Judgment".

== Significance ==
All these letters form a documentary resource of the first order that allows for a more precise understanding of Voltaire's work and its history. It is also the journal of a life, the chronicle of a century, the journey of a mind.

While only allusive when discussing a work in progress, the correspondence becomes insistent, sometimes bordering on repetitiveness, when it seeks polemical effectiveness. It is a weapon, both offensive and defensive, the light weapon that complements the heavier armament, the pistol in contrast to the musket of the contes philosophiques, or the cannon of the Dictionnaire philosophique. The main concern of his correspondence was to win comrades-in-arms for the propagation of the ideals of the Enlightenment, for critical reason, for the self-determination of the individual, for freedom of expression and for social justice; to find comrades in arms, against the absolutist regime of oppression and persecution of dissenters, against censorship.

It is also a chronicle of the century. Literary first and foremost, scientific and metaphysical with Madame Du Châtelet, poetic and didactic with Frederick II of Prussia, social at Versailles or Sceaux, erotic with Madame Denis during stays at Court, political during the Seven Years' War, legal during the Maupeou ministry, economic and reformist with the Physiocrats, dealing with legislation and strategy with Catherine II of Russia. Voltaire, however, says nothing about some of his works, including the contes philosophiques.

The corpus of letters is a delicate object to interpret. Varying in tone depending on the recipients, it is composed of statements that are sometimes truthful, frequently fallacious, and often serve a staged purpose: epistolary artifice, ostentatious letters, and shameless denials of authorship of his works.

== Place of the letters in his work ==
The place of Voltaire's correspondence in his work is debated. For some, it is his masterpiece, a work in its own right forming a kind of epistolary novel. For others this latter view is mistaken, the correspondence as a coherent whole being the construct of later critics rather than of Voltaire himself:

Born from the desire to exalt the memory of the man, to defend him, and to illuminate his work, it is the product of an act that was both editorial and political. Literary criticism, in its pursuit of the slightest trace left by the man...augmented, authenticated, and ennobled it through its interventions. The place it has occupied within the entirety of Voltaire's written output is due not only to this critical attention, but also to the public's disaffection for a portion of his work that adhered to aesthetic criteria now poorly understood, and consequently to the modern taste for intimate writing, fragments, and sketches.

== Modern editions ==
- Besterman, Theodore, ed. (1968–1977). Correspondence and Related Documents, Definitive Edition. Œuvres complètes de Voltaire. Volumes 85–135. Oxford: Voltaire Foundation. ISBN 9780729400497.
- Besterman, Theodore, ed. (1977–1993). Correspondance. Paris: Gallimard. ISBN 9782070112548.
- A digital edition, based on the 1968–1977 Besterman edition, has been published by Oxford University Press on the Electronic Enlightenment website.

== General selections in English translation ==
- Letters, from M. De Voltaire, to Several of His Friends. Translated by Franklin, Rev. Dr. London: T. Davies. 1770.
- Voltaire in His Letters: Being a Selection from His Correspondence. Translated by Tallentyre, S. G. London: John Murray. 1919.
- Select Letters of Voltaire. Translated by Besterman, Theodore. London: Thomas Nelson. 1963.
- The Selected Letters of Voltaire. Translated by Brooks, Richard A. New York: New York University Press. 1973. ISBN 0814709729.
