= Mina Crandon =

American spiritualist (1888–1941)

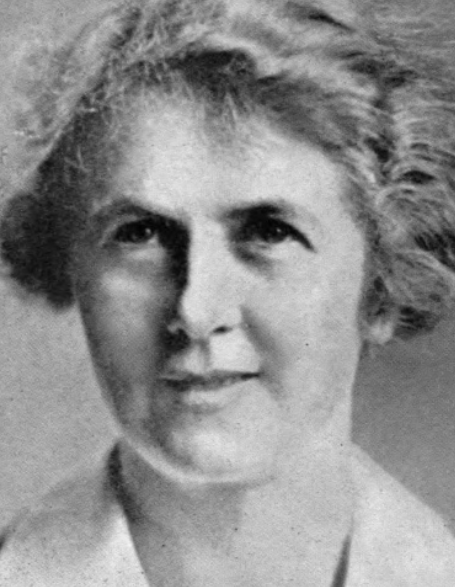
- Born: 1888; Ontario, Canada
- Died: November 1, 1941 (aged 52–53); Beacon Hill, Boston
- Occupation: Spiritualist medium

Mina 'Margery' Crandon (1888–November 1, 1941) was an American psychic medium who performed under the stage name 'Margery' and claimed to channel her dead brother, Walter Stinson. Investigators who studied Crandon concluded that she had no such paranormal ability, and others detected her in outright deception. She became known as her alleged paranormal skills were touted by Sherlock Holmes author Sir Arthur Conan Doyle and were disproved by magician Harry Houdini. Crandon was investigated by members of the American Society for Psychical Research and employees of the Scientific American.

Crandon was the wife of a wealthy Boston surgeon and socialite, Dr. Le Roi Goddard Crandon. Her life has been extensively documented in magic and parapsychology literature.

== Biography ==
Born Mina Marguerite Stinson, Mina grew up on a farm near Picton, Ontario, Canada. She moved to Boston as a young woman. While working as a secretary of a local church in Boston, she met and married Earl Rand, a grocer. They had one son. She later met Dr. Le Roi Goddard Crandon when she entered a Dorchester, Massachusetts hospital for an unspecified operation, possibly appendicitis. Crandon was her surgeon. The two crossed paths again later that year when Crandon served as a lieutenant commander and head of surgical staff in a New England Naval hospital during World War I, and she was a civilian volunteer ambulance driver who transported casualties to the hospital. Mina sued for divorce from Earl P. Rand in January 1918 and became Crandon's third wife a few months later. She moved to Crandon's house at 10 Lime Street with her son. Crandon later adopted her son and changed the boy's name to John Crandon.

== Scientific American ==
Mina began experimenting with séances as a hobby, possibly to distract her older husband from a morbid obsession with mortality. On June 23, 1924, her name was submitted by her husband as a candidate for a prize offered by Scientific American magazine to any medium who could demonstrate telekinetic ability under scientific controls. With a doctor as husband, Margery was well prepared for the challenge, and her charm and lack of interest in personal monetary reward made her seem honest to the public eye. Her séance circles included members of the middle class as well as luminary members of the Boston upper class and Ivy League elite. Famous supporters such as Sir Arthur Conan Doyle gave her significant credibility. She became so popular that her prayers were read by the U.S. Army. The Scientific American prize committee consisted of William McDougall, professor of psychology at Harvard; Harry Houdini, the famous professional magician and escape artist; Walter Franklin Prince, American psychical researcher; Daniel Frost Comstock, who introduced Technicolor to film; and Hereward Carrington, amateur magician, psychical researcher, author, and manager for the Italian medium Eusapia Palladino.

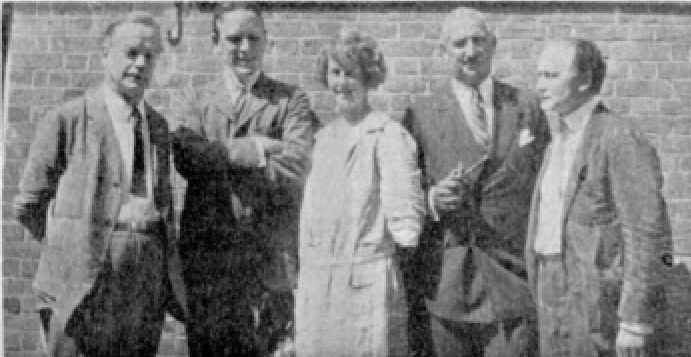
From left to right. Walter Franklin Prince, Daniel Frost Comstock, Mina Crandon, O. D. Munn, Harry Houdini.

J. Malcolm Bird, an employee of Scientific American (not on the Prize Committee) notified Houdini of the possibility that "Margery" might win the prize. Houdini and other prize committee members attended two séances in Boston at Margery (and her husband's) home on July 23 and 24, 1924, and claimed to have observed Margery's tricks. According to Houdini, Margery had escaped control and stretched her foot to ring a bell in the séance room. Houdini told the committee about the fraud and gave a practical demonstration; however, Bird in an article for Scientific American praised Margery's abilities and newspapers supported Bird's declarations.

They visited again on August 23, 1924, for a few days. On the August visit, Houdini exposed the mechanics used during the séance, along with other people involved in creating the noises during the séance. Houdini asked her to wear an apparatus that prevented her from using her legs. The apparatus was a large cabinet-box leaving only her head and hands sticking out. On August 25 with Comstock and Houdini in a séance Margery was placed in the cabinet. A box with a bell was placed on a table in front of the cabinet. During the séance the bell made a noise but when the lights were turned on it was revealed the lid of the cabinet-box had been forced open. Houdini claimed Crandon had cheated and had rung the bell herself.

There was much disagreement among the committee, and in the end, only Carrington voted in favor of Crandon. However, committee Secretary Malcolm Bird leaked to the press that the committee was leaning toward a positive vote. Incensed, committee member Harry Houdini returned from abroad to submit his dissenting vote. His efforts to discredit Crandon became a part of his stage act, and he reproduced her effects for audiences as well as published a pamphlet that described how she achieved some of her more basic effects.

On August 27, the investigator, Comstock, asked her to wear a similar device called a "median control". The device consisted of a box into which Crandon and an investigator would put their feet. Connecting to the box was a board that was locked on top of the knees, preventing withdrawal of the feet. Crandon's hands were held by the investigator and the box with the bell was placed outside the control-box. Crandon agreed to be tested and, because of the strict control, no paranormal phenomena in the séance were observed. Margery did not win the prize money.

=== Ruler incident ===
During a séance with the cabinet-box, Crandon requested that the sides be closed so she could move her hands freely inside the cabinet. A collapsible ruler was later found in the cabinet. Houdini suggested that Crandon had used the ruler with her neck to ring the bell. In response, Crandon accused Houdini and his assistant Jim Collins of placing the ruler inside the cabinet to discredit her. Houdini and Collins were both questioned about the incident and denied placing the ruler in the cabinet.

In 1959, author William Lindsay Gresham accused Collins of placing the ruler and quoted him as saying "I chucked it in the box meself. The Boss told me to do it. He wanted to fix her good". However, doubts have been raised about this statement. Magic historian Milbourne Christopher dismissed the alleged statement as "sheer fiction". According to Christopher, the source of the quotation was a rival magician to Houdini, Fred Keating, and is unreliable. In 2003, Massimo Polidoro noted that "the incident remains doubtful to this day."

== Investigations ==
By 1925, due to the investigation of Crandon, the American Society for Psychical Research (ASPR) had been taken over by a spiritualist faction. The ASPR championed Crandon and suppressed any reports unfavorable to her. In response, Walter Franklin Prince, who was the Society's research officer, resigned to establish the Boston Society for Psychical Research. Prince was accused by supporters of Crandon of being biased against paranormal phenomena.

Crandon's husband was known for displaying nude photographs of her in her mediumship sessions. Mina Crandon was described as a beautiful woman whom men found "too attractive for her own good". It was suggested that the psychical investigator J. Malcolm Bird actively conspired with the Crandons in stage-managing the séances in an attempt to have a sexual relationship with Mina. Reports, however, suggest that Mina found Bird repulsive. Instead, she had amorous feelings for the psychical researcher Hereward Carrington, with whom she had an affair. Carrington also borrowed money he was unable to repay from Crandon. Critics have written that it is easy to imagine these factors could have biased his judgement regarding her mediumship.

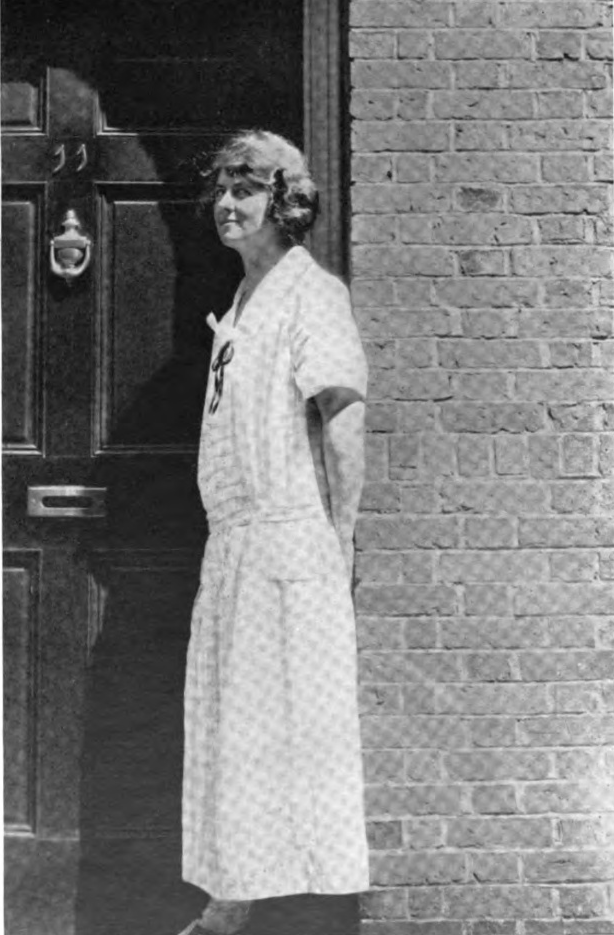
Crandon in 1924.

Crandon performed many of her séances in the nude and was reported to throw herself onto the laps of her male sitters. She was also described as an alcoholic. During séances, Eric Dingwall told Crandon to take off her clothes and sit in the nude. Crandon would also sometimes sprinkle luminous powder on her breasts and because of such activities William McDougall and other psychical researchers criticized Dingwall for having improper relations with Crandon.

Historian Ruth Brandon has noted that as Bird, Carrington and Dingwall were all personally involved with Crandon, they were biased and unreliable witnesses. Magician Fred Keating, who had observed Crandon at her house, suggested Carrington pretended some of her phenomena baffled him in an attempt to get financial backing for his own psychical laboratory.

A review by the father of modern parapsychology, Joseph Banks Rhine, lent further insight into Crandon's performances. Dr. Rhine was able to observe some of her trickery in the dark when she used luminous objects. Rhine claimed to have observed Crandon committing fraud in a séance in 1926. According to Rhine, during the séance, she was free from control and kicked a megaphone to give the impression it was levitating.

Rhine's report documenting the fraud was refused by the ASPR, so he published it in the Journal of Abnormal Social Psychology. In response, defenders of Crandon attacked Rhine. Arthur Conan Doyle wrote a letter to the Boston Herald attacking Rhine's "colossal impertinence...stupidity and malignancy."

Crandon continued to conduct séances, and the English teacher, Grant Code, became a frequent visitor to the Crandon home and was enthralled by Crandon's later performances. Ultimately, he too was able to duplicate them. Code's exchange of letters with psychic investigator Walter Franklin Prince regarding Margery is currently held in the archives of the ASPR.

An elaborate investigation was held by a committee of Harvard scholars. Finally, the Harvard committee also pronounced Crandon as fraudulent. On 30 June 1925, one of the Harvard investigators saw Crandon draw three objects from her lap. One object was shaped like a glove or flat hand, one resembled a baby's hand, and the third was described but not identified.

The American Society for Psychical Research wanted further investigation. In 1926, a committee of three professors (Knight Dunlap, Henry C. McComas and Robert Williams Wood) was sent to Boston. Crandon had a luminous star attached to her forehead, identifying the location of her face in the dark. After a few minutes, a narrow dark rod appeared over a luminous checkerboard which had been placed on the table opposite Crandon. It moved from side to side and picked up an object. As it passed in front of Wood, he lightly touched it with the tip of his finger and followed it back to a point very near Crandon's mouth. Wood thought it probable she was holding the rod by her teeth. He took hold of the tip and very quietly pinched it. It felt like a knitting needle covered with one or two layers of soft leather. Though the committee had been warned that touching the ectoplasm could result in the illness or death of the medium, neither Crandon nor the "ectoplasm" rod showed any reaction to Wood's actions. At the end of the sitting, Wood dictated his actions to the stenographer. Upon hearing this, Crandon gave a shriek and fainted. She was carried out of the room and the committee was asked to depart. Wood was never invited again.

The committee that consisted of Dunlap, McComas and Wood considered the phenomena to be fraudulent. They concluded that the rod was an animal intestine that had been "stuffed with cotton and stiffened with wire". In 1939, Crandon's husband died and Crandon, an alcoholic, went into a deep depression. At one of her last séances she attempted to jump off the roof of the house.

== Fraud ==
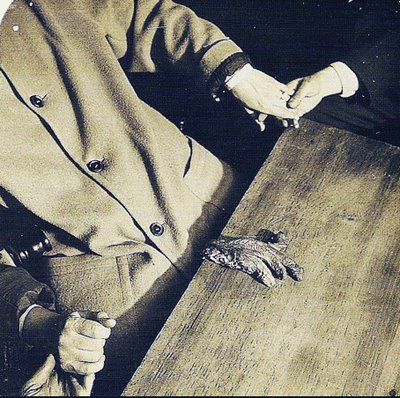
Mina Crandon with her "spirit hand" which was discovered to be made from a piece of carved animal liver.

Crandon's "teleplasmic hand" that allegedly appeared in photographs was said to resemble animal tissue and trachea, cut and sewn together. Allegations were made by some conjuring historians of Houdini and mediumship that her surgeon husband had altered her genitalia, and this was where she concealed her teleplasmic hand. The "hand" did not move after its appearance on the table before her. It lay still as if it were dead, and then supposedly vanished. She refused to wear tights or to be internally searched, but no proof that Crandon had been surgically altered has ever been published. The "hand" appeared only when Crandon sat next to her husband, who held or controlled her right hand.

There are photos of the alleged teleplasmic hand and its position. It appeared to be coming from Crandon's groin. Various members of the audience in the séances touched the hand and described it as dead. It was also suggested that Crandon's husband may have sneaked it into the séance room. The "teleplasmic hand" was later exposed as a trick when biologists examined the hand and found it to be made of a piece of carved animal liver.

Crandon used a trick in an attempt to fool psychical researchers that the "spirit" voices in her séances did not come from her own mouth. According to magician John Booth this was performed by Crandon filling her mouth with water before the séance had started and when the lights were turned off, swallowing the water. Before the end of the séance she would refill her mouth with water from a corked test tube. Crandon's reputation was also damaged when a fingerprint left on wax ostensibly by her channeled spirit, her deceased brother, Walter, was discovered to belong to her dentist Frederick Caldwell by a member of the Boston Society for Psychical Research. Her dentist divulged that he had taught her how to make these prints.

In 1934, Walter Franklin Prince described the Crandon case as "the most ingenious, persistent, and fantastic complex of fraud in the history of psychic research." Crandon continued to perform until her death in 1941, at about the age of 53.

Italian skeptic investigator Massimo Polidoro has written an entire history of Crandon's mediumship and documented her tricks.

== Secret accomplice ==
In 1933, Walter Franklin Prince wrote an article for the Scientific American that claimed J. Malcolm Bird intended to publish a confession in the ASPR in 1930 admitting that an act of fraud had taken place to trick Houdini in 1924. According to Prince the report "has not been printed and very few of the believers in Europe or America know of its existence." Part of Bird's (rejected) report to the ASPR read:

The occasion was one of Houdini's visits to Boston for the purpose of the sitting... She [Crandon] sought a private interview with me and tried to get me to agree, in the event the phenomena did not occur, that I would ring the bell-box myself, or produce something else that might pass as activity by Walter... It seems to me of paramount importance, in that it shows her, fully conscious and fully normal, in a situation where she thought she might have to choose between fraud and a blank séance; and she was willing to choose fraud.

Houdini had suspected Bird as an accomplice for Crandon in the Scientific American investigation in 1924. Bird resigned from the investigation after Houdini announced on a radio program: "I publicly denounce here Malcolm Bird as being an accomplice of Margery!"

Joseph Banks Rhine, who caught Crandon free from control and kicking a megaphone during a séance, wondered why Bird, with three years of experience, did not expose any of her tricks. Rhine suspected that Bird was a confederate of the medium. The psychical researcher William Henry Salter speculated that Crandon's husband may have been an accomplice and that blackmail may have been involved, he also noted that Hereward Carrington admitted to having a several months long affair with Crandon and, although she found Malcolm Bird "disgusting looking", he also claimed to have had a romance with her.

Ruth Brandon also suspected Crandon's husband and wrote that he was "colluding with his wife in her frauds".

== Gallery ==
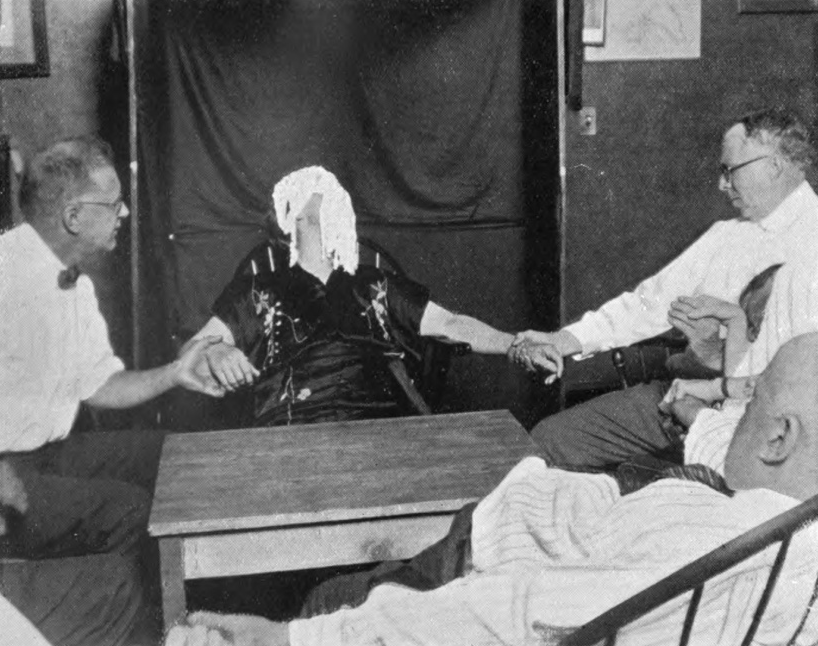
Crandon with alleged ectoplasm on her face

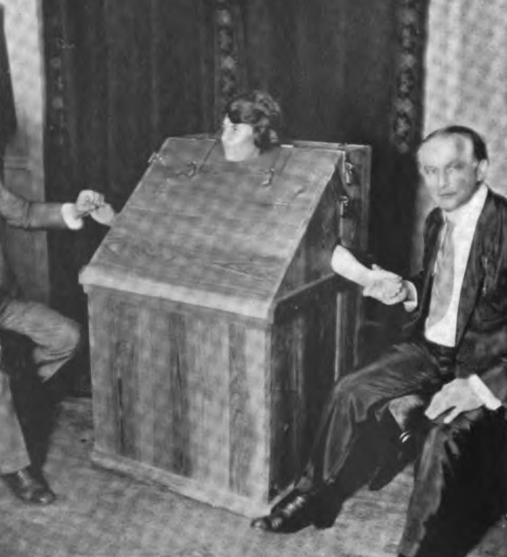
Crandon in box device with Harry Houdini

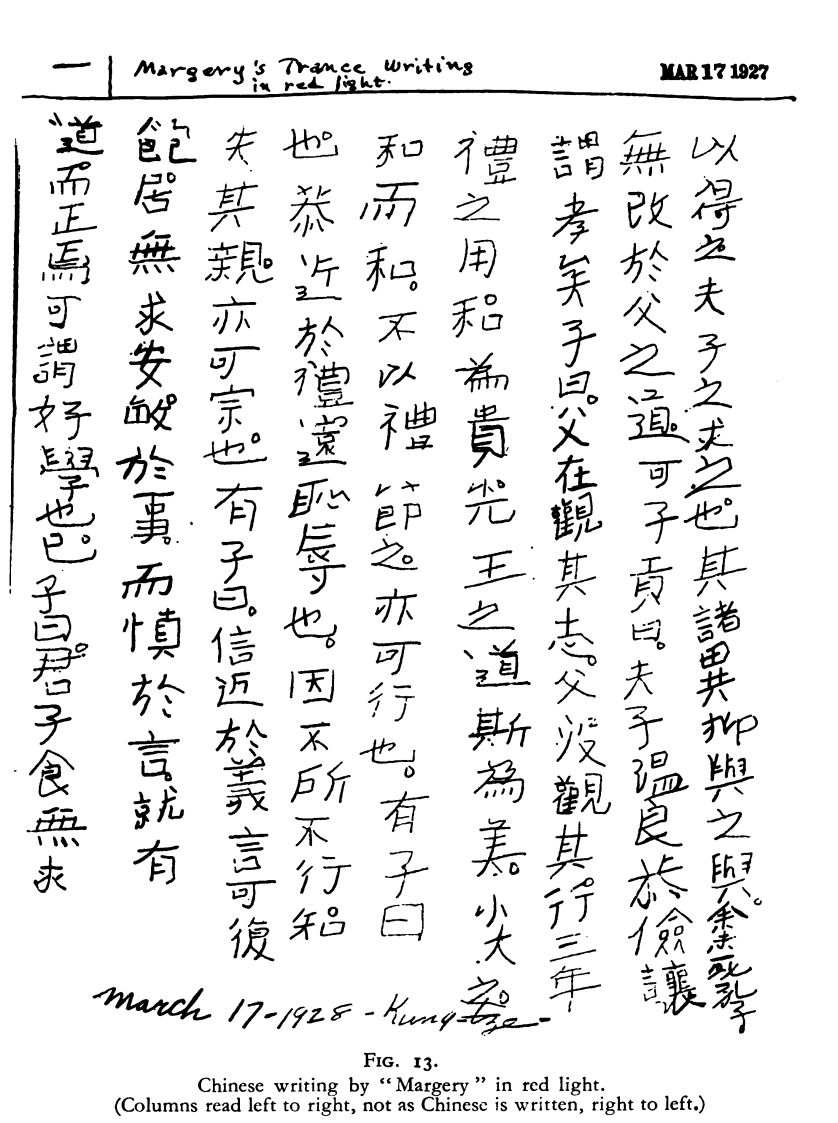
Example of Crandon's automatic writing

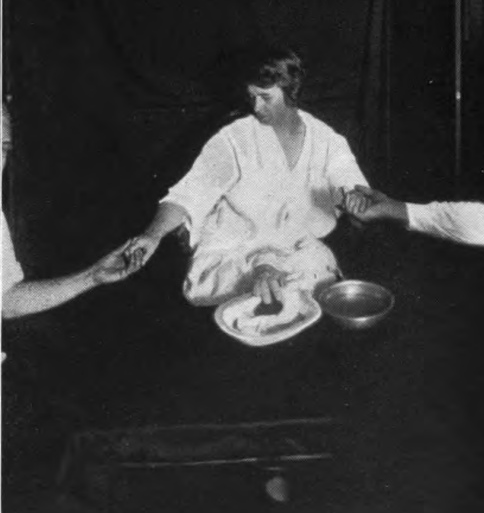
Crandon with fraudulent materialized hand

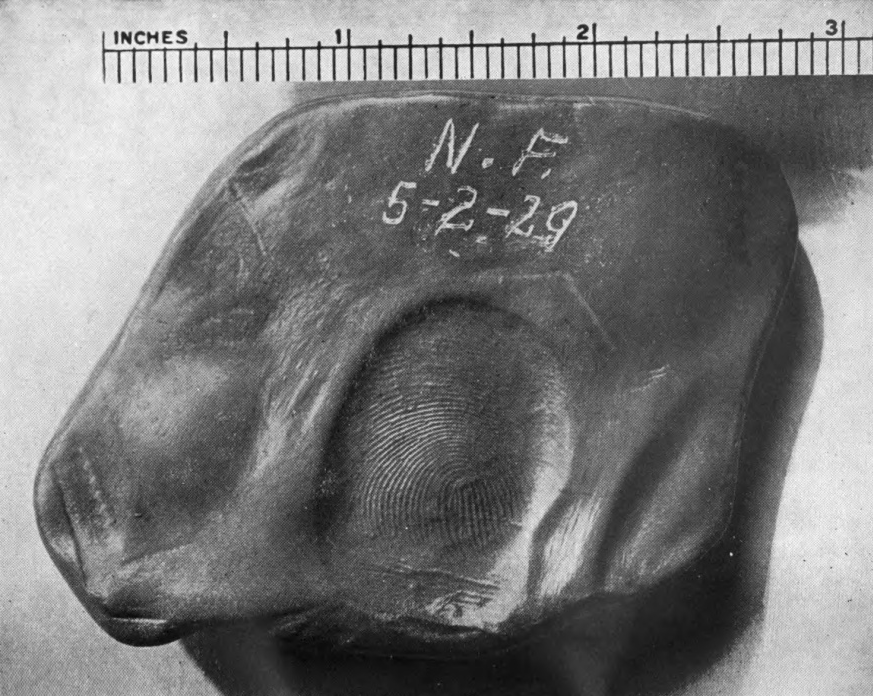
Thumb-print on dental wax from a Crandon séance

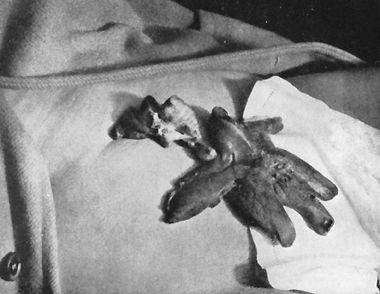
The fraudulent materialized hand that was found to be made from carved animal liver

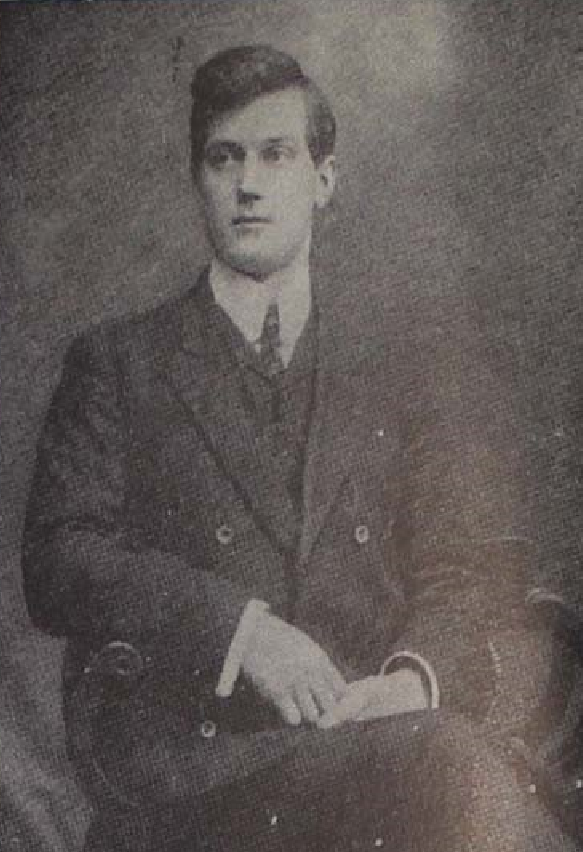
Walter Stinson, brother of Crandon

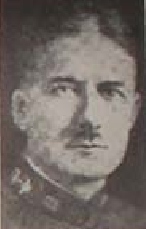
Le Roi Goddard Crandon, husband of Crandon
