= Gladys Osborne Leonard =

British trance medium

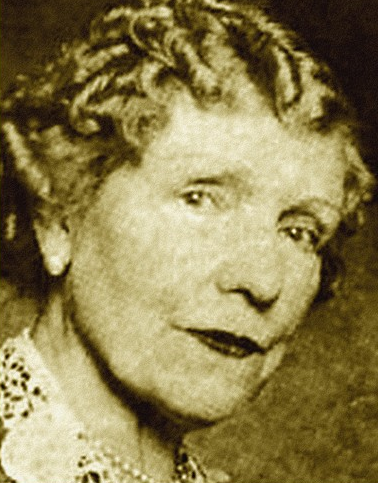
Gladys Osborne Leonard

Gladys Osborne Leonard (28 May 1882 – 19 March 1968) was a British trance medium, renowned for her work with the Society for Psychical Research. Although psychical researchers such as Oliver Lodge were convinced she had communicated with spirits, skeptical researchers were convinced that Leonard's trance control was a case of dissociative identity disorder.

== Life ==
Leonard was born in Lytham on 28 May 1882. She claimed to have experienced her first 'visitation' by spirits when she was a child. She claimed that the spirits would show her landscapes which she would refer to as the 'Happy Valley'. She was trained as a singer but childhood illness in 1906 prevented her from continuing. Her interest in spiritualism developed whilst she was ill when a Spiritualist nurse in the hospital invited her to take part in her first table seance.

== Work ==
By 1915 Leonard was giving professional readings. She claimed to channel the spirit of an Indian woman named Feda who had been married to her great-great-grandfather, and readings were given 'through' her. Patrons of Leonard attested that when Feda was being channelled Leonard spoke in broken English with little understanding of the language.

Leonard gained fame as a medium after conducting séances with the family of Oliver Lodge, which were described in his book Raymond or Life and Death (1916). The book documented the séances that he and his wife had attended with Leonard. Lodge was convinced that his son Raymond had communicated with him and the book is a description of his son's experiences in the spirit world. According to the book Raymond had reported that people who had died were still the same people when they passed over; there were houses, trees and flowers and the Spirit world looked similar to earth but there is no disease. The book also claimed that when soldiers died in World War I they had smoked cigars and received whisky in the spirit world and because of such statements the book was criticised. Walter Cook wrote a rebuttal to Lodge Reflections on Raymond (1917) that directly challenged Lodge's beliefs in Spiritualism.

In 1918 Leonard began working with the Society for Psychical Research. The Society would often use proxies in place of grieving relatives in an attempt to minimise fraud. Their publication detailing the results of these sittings was praised by psychical researchers and resulted in even more publicity for Leonard. Leonard later worked with Radclyffe Hall and the results of those sessions were published in the Proceedings for the Society for Psychical Research in 1919.

== Reception ==
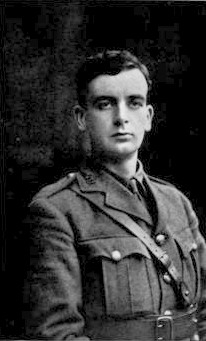
Raymond Lodge (1889–1915)

Researchers such as Clodd (1917), Culpin (1920), Hansel (1966) and Moore (1981) who investigated Leonard's mediumship from psychical reports were not convinced she had communicated with spirits.

Clodd has stated that Leonard had known some of her sitters before the séances, and could have obtained information by natural means. Culpin has suggested that her results could be explained by cold reading and subjective validation. As a medium she specialised in 'book tests', whereby she would select a book from the shelf which held special significance to the deceased. In 1921, Eleanor Sidgwick analysed these tests and found that only 36% were successful. The philosopher Antony Flew commented that Leonard's references to books and pages were imprecise.

Charles Richet who studied the alleged communications in Raymond concluded that autosuggestion was the likeliest explanation for the information gathered by Leonard and her spirit control "Feda" was a secondary personality. Historian Ruth Brandon has also noted that Feda was a "typical hysterical" second personality.

In 1934, Whately Carington tested Leonard and her control by word-association tests also came to the conclusion Feda was a secondary personality and not a spirit. The psychologist Donald West wrote regarding the tests:

Carington discovered that the results given by Feda and Mrs Leonard were neither what one would expect from testing two different persons nor what one would normally get from testing the same person twice. Superficially their patterns were grossly dissimilar, but they were related to each other – that is, negatively correlated. Where the normal Mrs Leonard tended to give a long reaction time, the entranced Mrs Leonard gave a short one, and vice versa. In other words Feda and Mrs Leonard were not independent individuals; they were complementary characters. The result is in keeping with the theory that Feda is a dramatization of the medium's own subconscious trends. It is very difficult to reconcile these findings with a Spiritualistic interpretation.

Although Lodge was convinced that Leonard's spirit control had communicated with his son, he admitted a good deal of the information was nonsense and suggested that Feda picked it up from a séance sitter. Philosopher Paul Carus wrote that the "story of Raymond's communications rather excels all prior tales of mediumistic lore in the silliness of its revelations. But the saddest part of it consists in the fact that a great scientist, no less a one than Sir Oliver Lodge, has published the book and so stands sponsor for it."

According to spiritualists Feda could speak independently of the medium. To investigate this the psychical researchers Theodore Besterman and Gerald Heard tested with microphones the amount of displacement from the medium's mouth. A voice was heard on occasion but no displacement was detected. The conclusion was that the voice effect was merely a ventriloquial illusion. It was claimed by spiritualists that Leonard's spirit control Feda communicated with Raymond, however when asked specific questions he failed to answer them. Raymond could not give the name of a single soldier he had been with before his death.

The researcher Walter Mann was convinced that Leonard was a fraud. In a séance on 3 December 1915 Leonard described an army photograph featuring Raymond the son of Oliver Lodge sitting on the ground with an officer placing his hand on his shoulder. Mann wrote that Leonard had already seen the photograph as she had five days to obtain the photograph before the séance. Paul Tabori wrote that the photograph "might have been seen, described and even copied by others. There is no evidence that Sir Oliver went into all the possibilities of trickery."

== Publications ==
- My Life in Two Worlds (1931)
- Personality Survives Death: Messages from Sir William Barrett [with Florence Elizabeth Perry Barrett] (1937)
- The Last Crossing (1939)
- Brief Darkness (1942)
- Light on the Horizon [with Archibald Tyrell Robinson] (1959)
