= Walter Franklin Prince =

American parapsychologist

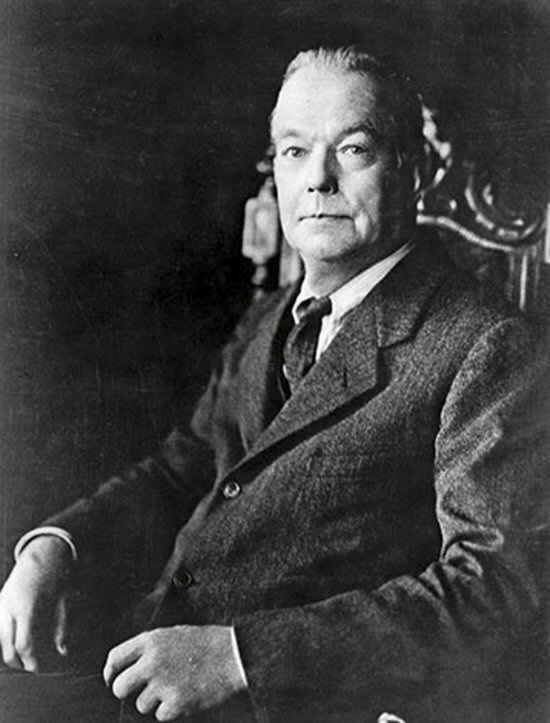
- Born: 22 April 1863; Detroit, Maine
- Died: 7 August 1934 (aged 71)
- Occupations: Episcopal minister, parapsychologist

Walter Franklin Prince (22 April 1863 – 7 August 1934) was an American parapsychologist and founder of the Boston Society for Psychical Research in Boston.

== Career ==
Born in Detroit, Maine, Prince graduated from Maine Wesleyan Seminary in 1881 to become an Episcopal minister. He earned a BD in 1886 from Drew Theological Seminary and a PhD from Yale University in 1899. His doctoral thesis was on multiple personality. In 1910 he was the rector of All Saints' Church in Pittsburgh and in 1916 the director of psychotherapeutics at St. Marks's Episcopal Church in New York City.

In 1885, Prince married Lelia Madora Colman, they had no children but adopted a daughter. Lelia died in 1924. Prince authored several works on the study of human psychic abilities, among them The Psychic in the House (Boston 1926), The Case of Patience Worth (Boston 1927), The Enchanted Boundary (Boston 1930). He was fiercely critical of the claims of the physical medium Margery Mina Crandon.

In 1908, Prince joined the American Society for Psychical Research (ASPR). In 1915 he left the clergy and became an assistant for his friend James H. Hyslop. When Hyslop died in 1920, he became the research officer and editor for the ASPR Journal and Proceedings.

Prince was a friend to Harry Houdini and Hereward Carrington and they all had exposed the tricks of fraudulent mediums, however, unlike Houdini, both Carrington and Prince believed that some mediums were genuine. Houdini and Prince wrote many letters to each other.

According to the psychical researcher Robert Ashby "[Prince] remained highly skeptical of PK and other physical phenomena, but felt that there was no doubt at all of telepathy, clairvoyance and precognition." In 1927, Prince contributed to the book The Case For And Against Psychical Belief (1927) which contains essays by both believers and skeptics of psychical phenomena. Prince was a close friend with the parapsychologist Joseph Banks Rhine. He published and wrote the introduction for Rhine's book Extrasensory Perception (1934).

Prince was a member of the Scientific American Committee to examine paranormal claims. He became one of its editors for articles on parapsychological phenomena. He was the only American, other than William James, who occupied the position of President of the Society for Psychical Research in London, which he did for two years 1930 and 1931.

== Investigations ==
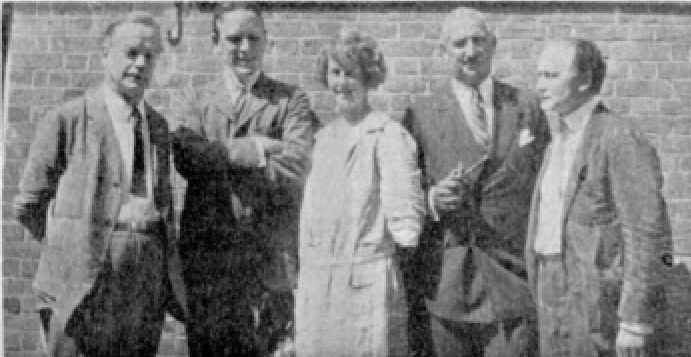
From left to right. Walter Franklin Prince, Daniel Frost Comstock, Mina Crandon, O. D. Munn, Harry Houdini.

Prince was skeptical of the claims of physical mediums. To help expose fraud, he familiarised himself with the tricks of conjurors and became a member of the Society of American Magicians. He discovered that many physical mediums had utilized sleight of hand trickery. He authored the paper A Survey of American Slate-Writing Mediumship which was almost 300 pages. In this paper he exposed the fraudulent methods of the slate-writing medium Pierre L. O. A. Keeler. He later became a believer in psychic phenomena but remained skeptical of spiritualism.

In 1921, Prince travelled to Mexico and collaborated with the German physician Gustav Pagenstecher on experiments with the clairvoyant Senora Maria Reyes de Zierold in psychometry. Prince came to the conclusion that she possessed genuine ESP ability. He told Hans Driesch that the experiments with Zierold had converted him, that he had gone to Mexico a skeptic but came back a "psychist".

In 1922, Prince investigated an alleged poltergeist occurrence at a farm in Caledonia Mills. He concluded that the phenomena was produced by Mary-Ellen the adopted daughter of the owners of the farm. Prince supported the mediumship of Pearl Curran who he had visited in 1924 and experimented with in 1926, but did not come to any definite conclusion.

By 1925 due to the investigation of Mina Crandon the American Society for Psychical Research had been taken over by a spiritualist faction. The ASPR championed Crandon and suppressed any reports unfavourable to her. Prince was alarmed at the number of "credulous spiritualists" that joined the ASPR. In response, Prince who was the Society's research officer resigned to establish the Boston Society for Psychical Research with the help of his friend William McDougall. Prince and other critics were accused by supporters of Crandon of being biased against paranormal phenomena. Prince in a letter to magician Joseph Rinn on February 1, 1934 described the Crandon case as "the most ingenious, persistent, and fantastic complex of fraud in the history of psychic research."

Prince exposed the medium Maria Silbert. She had developed the ability to maneuver a stiletto using only her feet and was thus able to write names on cigarette cases when they were held under the table. Prince attended a series of séance sittings with Rudi Schneider and no paranormal phenomena was observed. In his notes in the Bulletin VII of the Boston SPR published under Experiments with Physical Mediums in Europe (1928) he wrote "despite my studied and unremitting complaisance, no phenomena have occurred when I had any part in the control, save curtain movement which were capable of the simplest explanation." He also attended séances with the medium Jan Guzyk and came to the conclusion he had no paranormal ability.

== Reception ==
Prince's research and writings were influential amongst parapsychologists. He has been described as one of the "great masters" in the history of parapsychology.

Prince drew criticism from both skeptics and spiritualists. Those in the spiritualist community considered him an opponent of spiritualism, whilst skeptics such as psychologist Joseph Jastrow accused Prince of being naïve and not applying the same level of skepticism he had towards other psychical phenomena.

== Publications ==
Books

- The Psychic in the House (1926)
- The Case of Patience Worth (1927)
- Noted Witnesses For Psychic Occurrences (1928)
- Leonard and Soule Experiments in Psychical Research (1929) [with Lydia W. Allison]
- The Enchanted Boundary (1930)

Papers

- — . (1915). The Doris Case of Multiple Personality, Part 1. Proceedings of the American Society for Psychical Research 9: 23-700.
- — . (1916). The Doris Case of Multiple Personality, Part 2. Proceedings of the American Society for Psychical Research 10: 701-1419.
- — . (1917). Psychological Tests for the Authorship of the Book of Mormon. American Journal of Psychology 28: 373-389.
- — . (1919). A Critical Study of "The Great Amherst Mystery". Proceedings of the American Society for Psychical Research 13: 89-130.
- — . (1919). A Footnote: "Authorship of the Book of Mormon". American Journal of Psychology 30: 427-428.
- — . (1919). Supplementary Report on the Keeler-Lee Photographs. Proceedings of the American Society for Psychical Research 13: 529-587.
- — . (1921). A Survey Of American Slate Writing Mediumship. Proceedings of the American Society for Psychical Research 15: 315-592.
- — . (1921). Psychometric Experiments with Senora Maria Reyes de Z. Proceedings of the American Society for Psychical Research 15: 189-314.
- — . (1922). An Investigation of Poltergeist and Other Phenomena Near Antigonish. Journal of the American Society for Psychical Research 16: 422-441.
- — . (1924). Testing Rafael Schermann. Journal of the American Society for Psychical Research 18: 537-561.
- — . (1925). My Doubts About Spirit Photographs. Scientific American 133: 370-371.
- — . (1926). A Review of the Margery Case. American Journal of Psychology 37: 431-441.
- — . (1928). Experiments with Physical Mediums in Europe. Bulletin of the Boston Society for Psychic Research 7: 3-107.
- — . (1932). A Sitting with Bert Reese. Journal of the Society for Psychical Research 27: 249-254.
- — . (1933). The Case Against Margery. Scientific American 148: 261-263.

Other

- Foreword to Gustav Pagenstecher. (1922). Past Events Seership: A Study in Psychometry. American Society for Psychical Research 16: 1-136.
- Foreword to Marietta Minnigerode Andrews. (1922). The Darker Drink. The Gorham Press.
- Chapter Is Psychical Research Worth While? In Carl Murchison. (1927). The Case For And Against Psychical Belief. Clark University.
- Chapter The Sinclair Experiments for Telepathy. In Upton Sinclair. (1930). Mental Radio. Charles C. Thomas Publishers.
- Introduction to Joseph Banks Rhine. (1934). Extra-Sensory Perception. Boston Society for Psychic Research.
