= American Society for Psychical Research =

Non-profit organization

- Abbreviation: ASPR
- Formation: 1884
- Legal status: Non-profit organization
- Purpose: Parapsychology
- Location: 5 West 73rd Street, New York City, 10023 (formerly)
- Region served: North America
- Members: Psychical researchers
- Main organ: Journal of the American Society for Psychical Research
- Affiliations: Society for Psychical Research
- Website: www.aspr.com

The American Society for Psychical Research (ASPR) is the oldest psychical research organization in the United States dedicated to parapsychology. Until the headquarters were sold in 2024, it maintained offices and a library in New York City that were open to members and the general public. The group has historically offered open membership, and anyone interested in psychical research was welcome to join. However, since the closing of the New York office, access to its researchers and research materials have become increasingly difficult. Nonetheless, it maintains a website and publishes the quarterly Journal of the American Society for Psychical Research.

== History ==
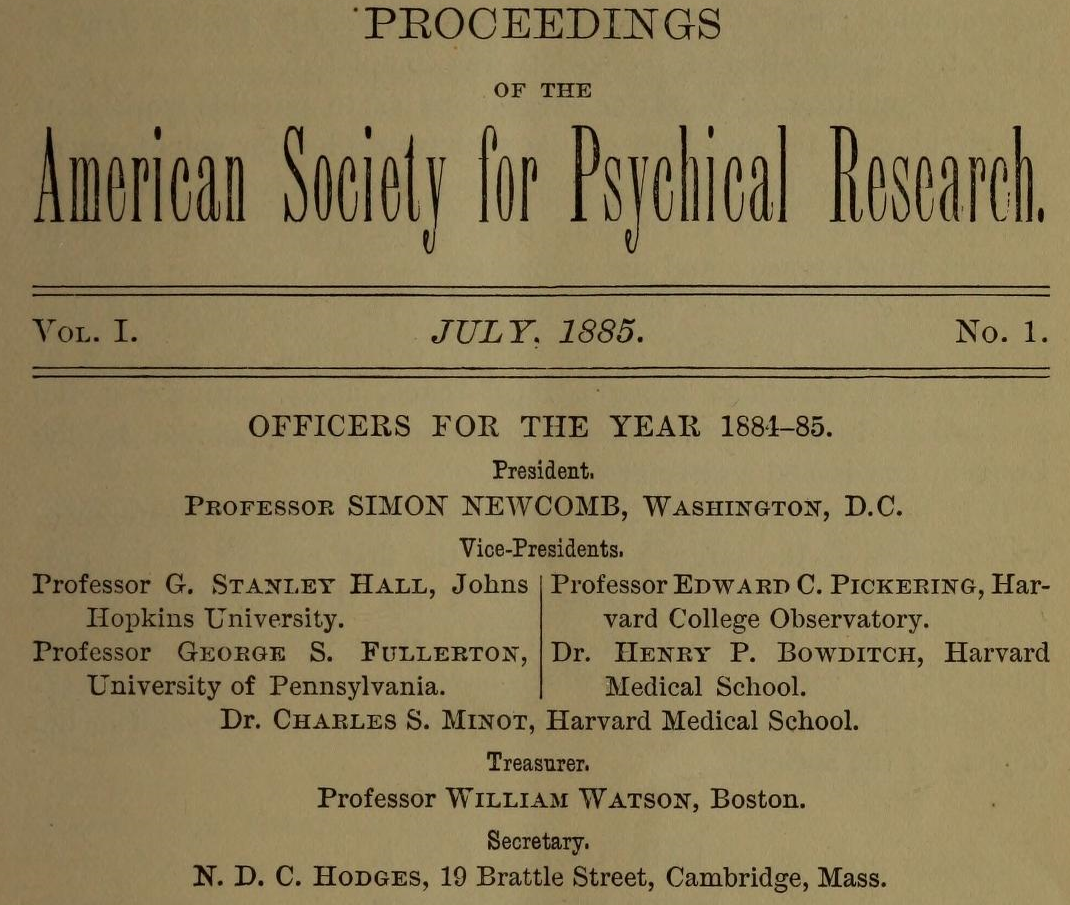
Officers for the SPR (1884–1885)

It was William Fletcher Barrett's visit to America that ultimately led to the formation of the American Society for Psychical Research in December, 1884. Barrett was invited by several members of the American Association for the Advancement of Science. He persuaded intellectuals such as Edward Charles Pickering, Simon Newcomb, Alexander Graham Bell, Henry Pickering Bowditch and William James that the claims of psychical phenomena should be investigated scientifically.

The first meetings of the society were held in the rooms of the American Academy of Arts and Sciences. The founding members who were also the first Vice-Presidents were G. Stanley Hall, George Stuart Fullerton, Edward Charles Pickering, Henry Pickering Bowditch and Charles Sedgwick Minot. Other founding members were Alpheus Hyatt, N. D. C. Hodges, William James and Samuel Hubbard Scudder. The mathematician Simon Newcomb was the first President.

Other early members included the psychologists James Mark Baldwin, Joseph Jastrow, and Christine Ladd-Franklin. Initial research findings were discouraging. By 1890, members such as Baldwin, Hall, Jastrow and Ladd-Franklin had resigned from the society. Hall and Jastrow became outspoken critics of parapsychology. Morton Prince and James Jackson Putnam left the ASPR in 1892 to form the American Psychological Association.

Richard Hodgson joined the ASPR in 1887 to serve as its secretary. In 1889, Fullerton, James and Josiah Royce were Vice-Presidents and Samuel Pierpont Langley served as President. In 1889, a financial crisis forced the ASPR to become a branch of the Society for Psychical Research, and Simon Newcomb and others left. Following the death of Hodgson in 1905 it achieved independence once more.

In 1906, James H. Hyslop took up the position as secretary of the recreated organization, with the work being done at his residence in New York City. He once wrote his son, "My work is missionary, not mercenary." The intended name for the new organization was, "The American Institute for Scientific Research" which Hyslop had organized into two sections for the investigation of two separate fields: "A" was to deal with psychopathology or abnormal psychology. Its Section "B" was to be concerned with what Hyslop called "supernormal psychology" or parapsychology. Section "A" never got off the ground. But Section "B" became the new and reorganized ASPR. One of the Institute's aims was to organize and endow investigations into telepathy, clairvoyance, mediumship, and kinetic phenomena. This work was to be carried out by "B." The society remained in New York, where it remains as of 2015. During this period the ASPR was heavily involved in the investigation of medium Leonora Piper about whom William James would famously declare in 1890: "To upset the conclusion that all crows are black, there is no need to seek demonstration that no crow is black; it is sufficient to produce one white crow; a single one is sufficient." Since his proclamation of Piper as his "one White Crow", the concept of the single "White Crow" has become a cliché in psychical re-search.

After evaluating sixty-nine reports of Piper's mediumship William James considered the hypothesis of telepathy as well as Piper obtaining information about her sitters by natural means such as her memory recalling information. According to James the "spirit-control" hypothesis of her mediumship was "somewhat incoherent, ambiguous, irrelevant, and, in some cases, demonstrably false—at best only circumstantial." However, G. Stanley Hall believed Piper's mediumship had an entirely naturalistic explanation and no telepathy was involved. Hall and Amy Tanner, who observed some of the trances, explained the phenomena in terms of the subconscious mind harboring various personalities that pretended to be spirits or controls. In their view, Piper had subconsciously absorbed information that she later regurgitated as messages from "spirits" in her trances.

On June 20, 1906, the ASPR had 170 members and by the end of November 1907, it had 677. Hereward Carrington became a member of the ASPR in 1907 and an assistant to James Hyslop until 1908, during which time he established his reputation as an ASPR investigator. However his connection with the ASPR ceased due to lack of funds. Carrington was the author the book The Physical Phenomena of Spiritualism which exposed the tricks of fraudulent mediums. According to Arthur Conan Doyle, Carrington was not popular with spiritualists.

James Hyslop died in 1920, and immediately strife broke out between the membership as the Society divided into two factions, one broadly pro-Spiritualism, indeed often Spiritualists, and the other 'conservative' faction favoring telepathy and skeptical of 'discarnate spirits' as an explanation for the phenomena studied, or simply skeptical of the phenomena's existence. In 1923 a prominent Spiritualist, Frederick Edwards, was appointed President, and the conservative faction led by Gardner Murphy and Walter Franklin Prince declared that the Society was becoming less academic. In the same year the ASPR lost 108 members. New members joined the society and William McDougall a past President and Prince both became alarmed at the number of "credulous spiritualists" that joined the ASPR.

In 1925 Edwards was reappointed President, and his support of the mediumistic claims of 'Margery' (Mina Crandon) led to the 'conservative' faction leaving and forming the rival Boston Society for Psychical Research in May, 1925. From this point on the ASPR remained highly sympathetic to Spiritualism until 1941, when the Boston Society for Psychical Research was reintegrated into the ASPR.

== Splinter group ==
The Boston Society for Psychical Research (BSPR) was founded in April 1925 by former research officer Walter Franklin Prince of the ASPR. Other founding members were William McDougall, Lydia W. Allison and Elwood Worcester. They were alarmed by the ASPR support for the purported medium Margery (Mina Crandon) and suppressing any reports unfavourable to her.

Joseph Banks Rhine claimed to have observed Crandon in fraud in a séance in 1926. According to Rhine during the séance she was free from control and kicked a megaphone to give the impression it was levitating. Rhine's report that documented the fraud was refused by the ASPR, so he published in it in the Journal of Abnormal and Social Psychology. In response, defenders of Crandon attacked Rhine. Arthur Conan Doyle published an article in a Boston Newspaper claiming "J. B. Rhine is an Ass."

There was a significant split in the history of American psychical research: the American Society for Psychical Research had become dominated by those sympathetic to Spiritualism; the Boston Society favored a naturalistic explanation (such as telepathy; yet telepathy within the laws of undiscovered physics) for purported mediumship and was critical of the purported mediumship of Mina Crandon in particular. Under President Walter Franklin Prince it organised the investigation of Mina during the Scientific American Prize dispute, and Harry Houdini worked with the group. BSPR investigators were involved in the uncovering of the alleged fraud of Mina Crandon—including a number of revelations often credited to Harry Houdini, but actually discovered by other BSPR members. In 1923, Prince described the Crandon case as "the most ingenious, persistent, and fantastic complex of fraud in the history of psychic research." The BSPR fell into obscurity following exposure of Mina Crandon, and was formally reincorporated into the American Society for Psychical Research in 1941.

In 1934 the BSPR published Extrasensory Perception by their member Joseph Banks Rhine, who introduced the term ESP to English, and the methodology of modern parapsychology, with its quantitative research and laboratory based approach, as distinct from the older psychical research.

=== Current Status ===
In 2020, the Supreme Court of the State of New York brought a foreclosure case against the ASPR with regard to the mortgaged property at 5 West 73rd Street, New York, and a judge ordered the building sold at auction. As reported in this story, the building was eventually sold in June 2024 for $11.75 million, which Ruffles and Conrad indicated was less than the sum of the ASPR’s obligations. The author of the Skeptical Inquirer article indicated that the ASPR had all but completely collapsed.

Today, the ASPR website is a shell of its former self. It lists a phone number and a new address, which turns out to be a rented mailbox at Manhattan Express Shipping on Columbus Avenue in New York. The website still accepts credit card payments for various levels of “membership,” which Vyse says he does not recommend since the organization appears to be in chaos.

== Founders ==
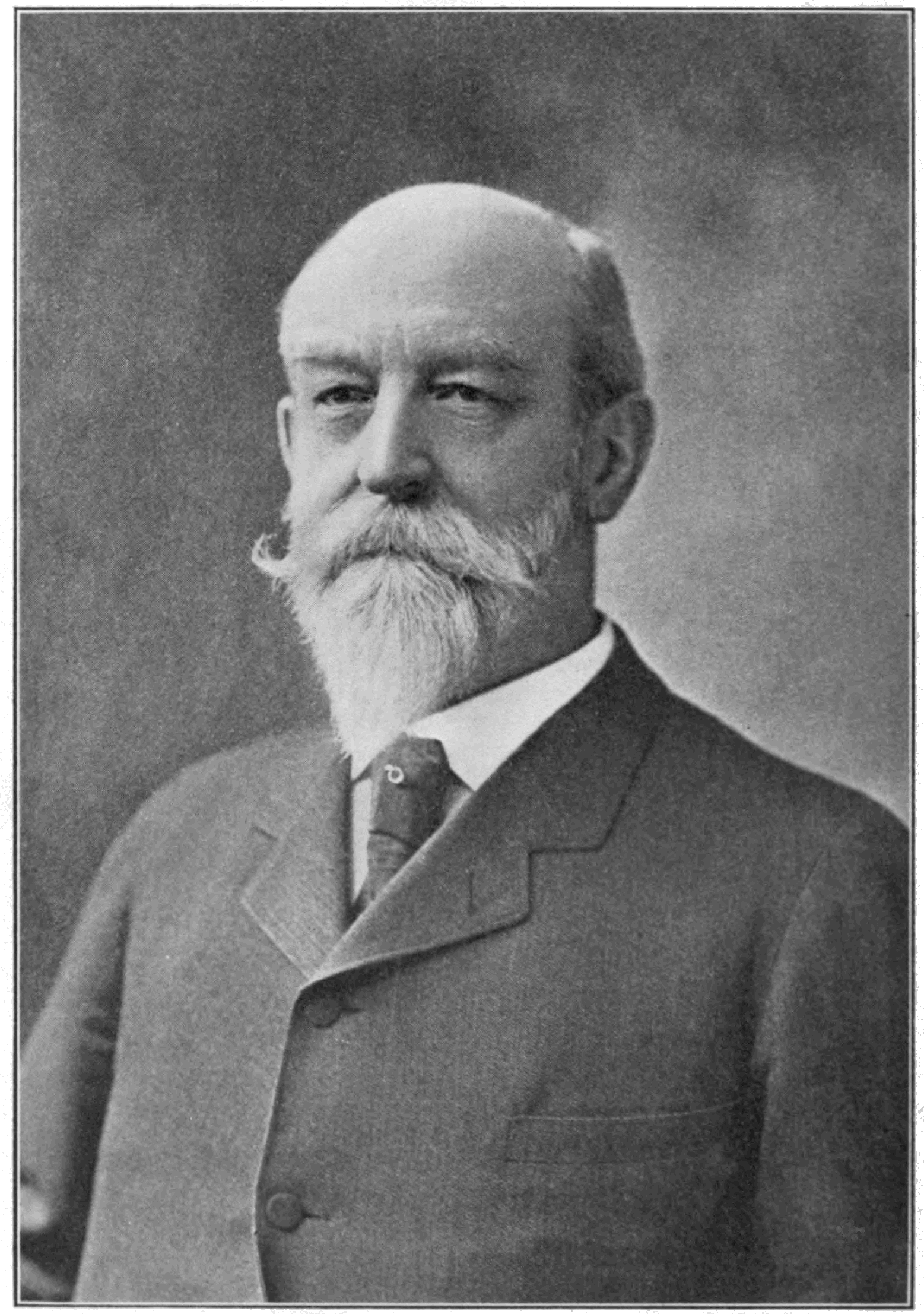
Henry Pickering Bowditch

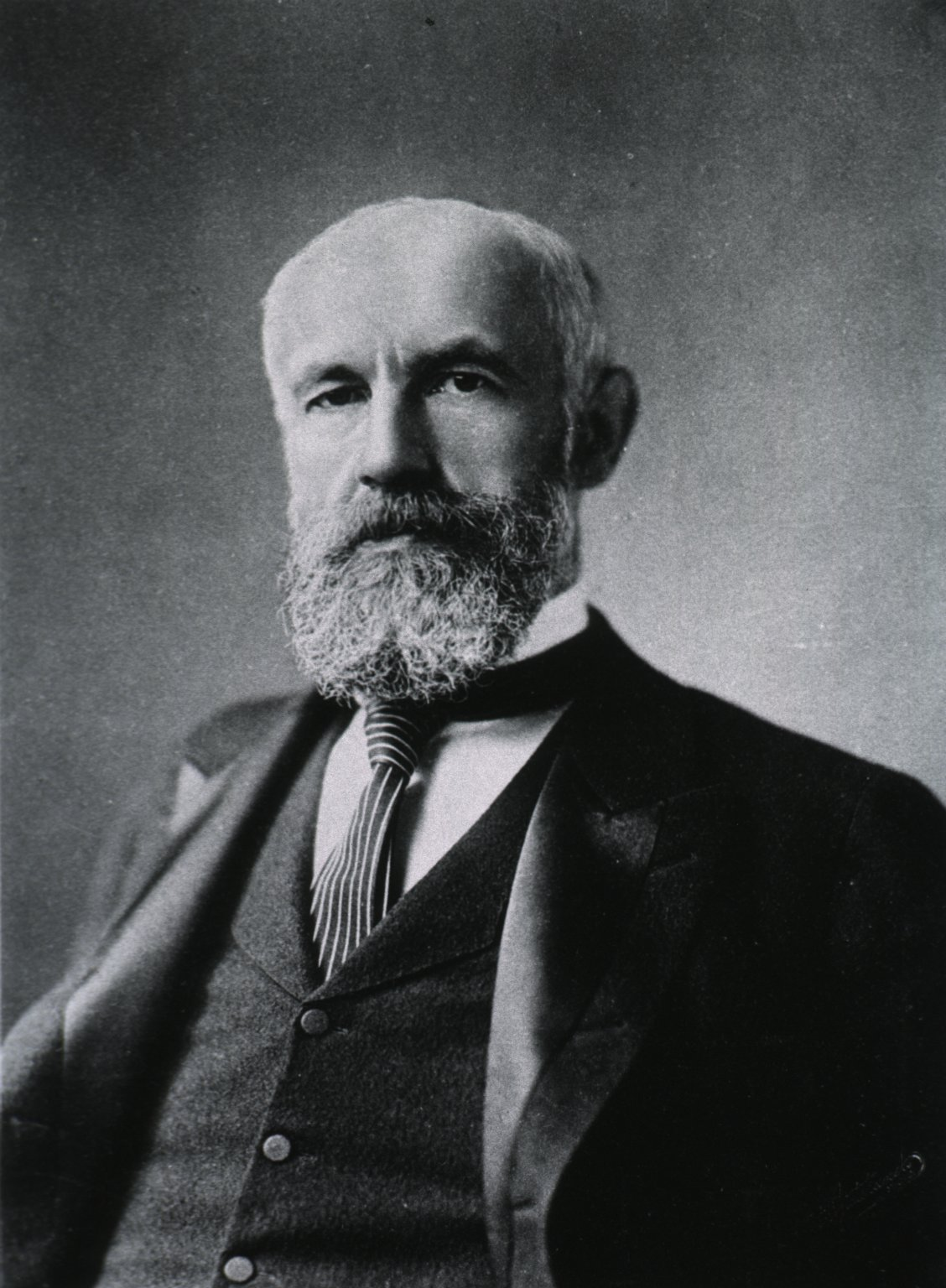
G. Stanley Hall

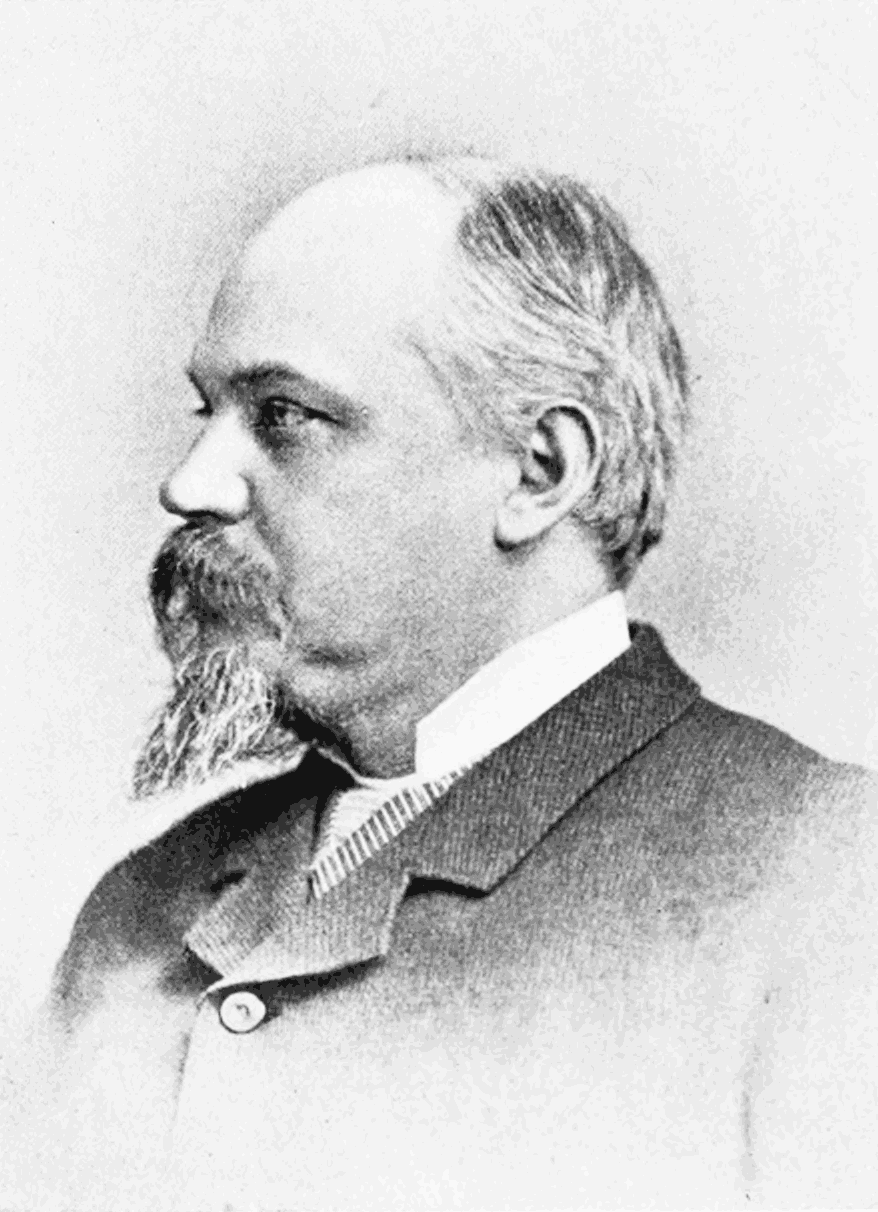
Alpheus Hyatt

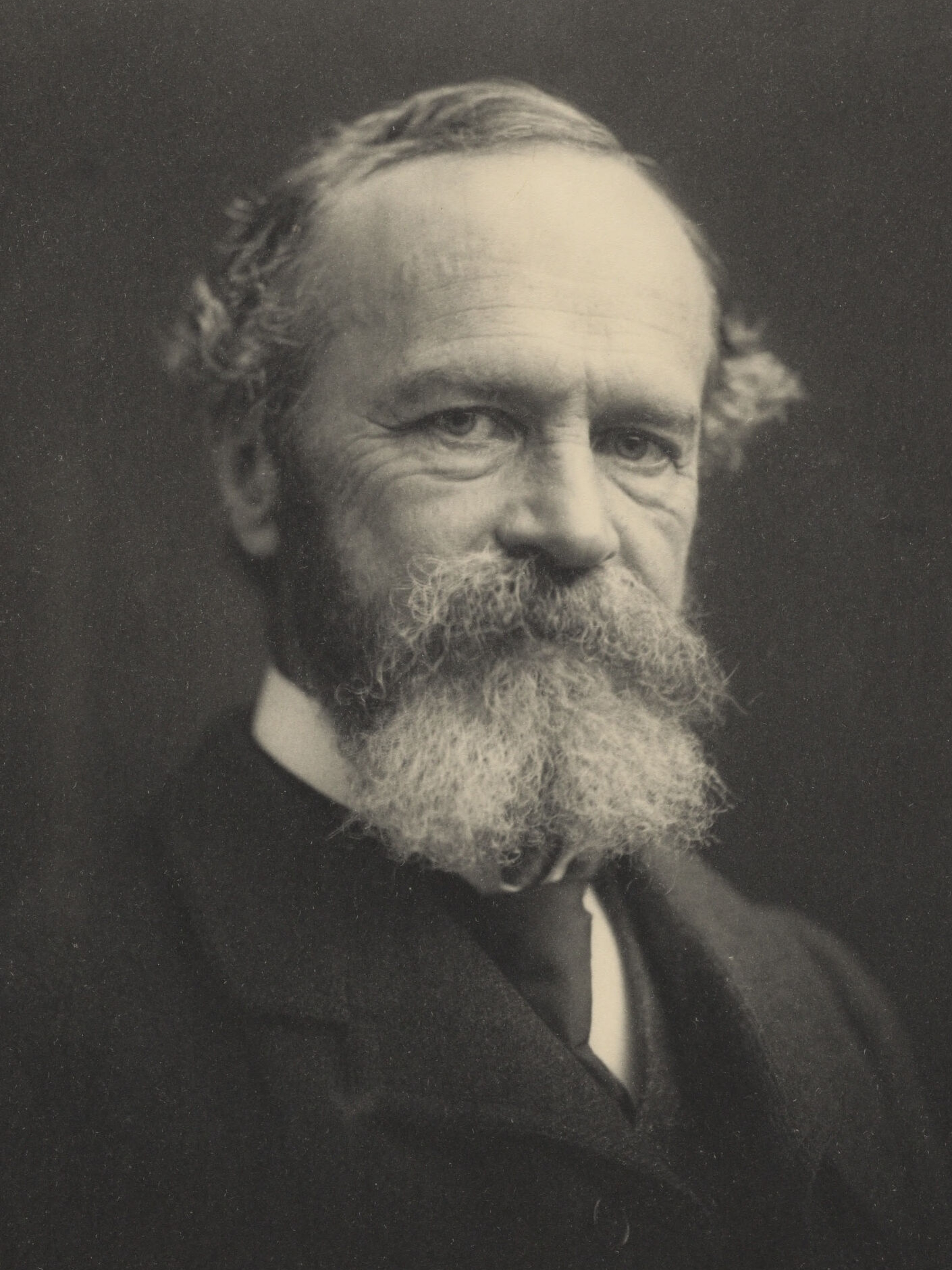
William James

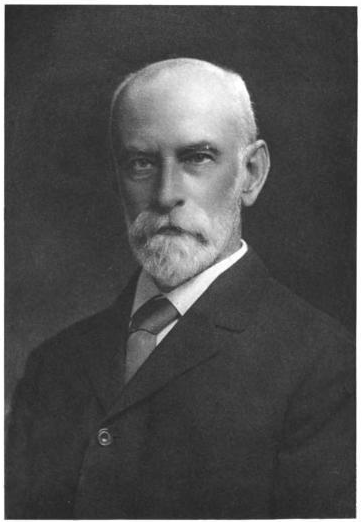
Charles Sedgwick Minot

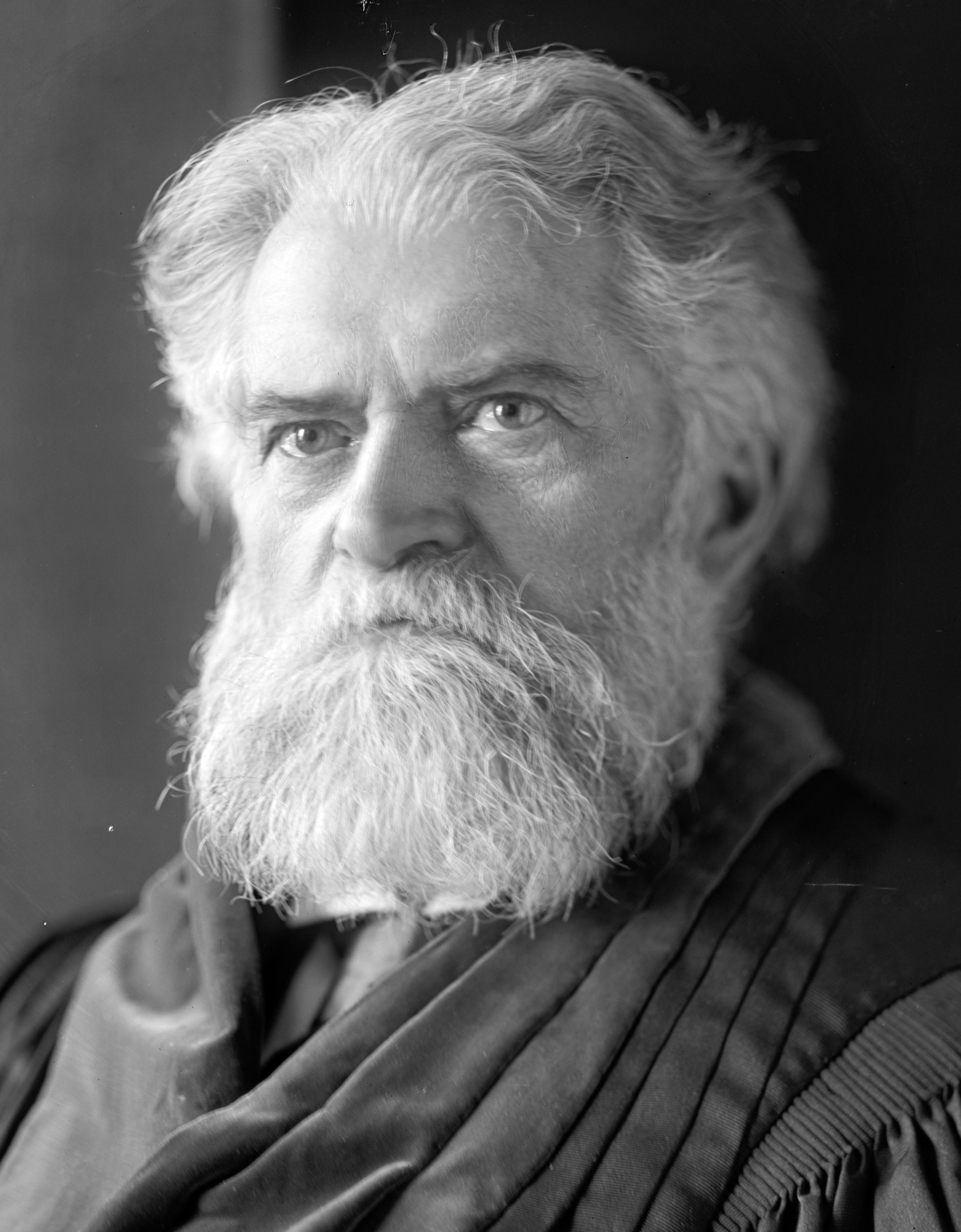
Simon Newcomb

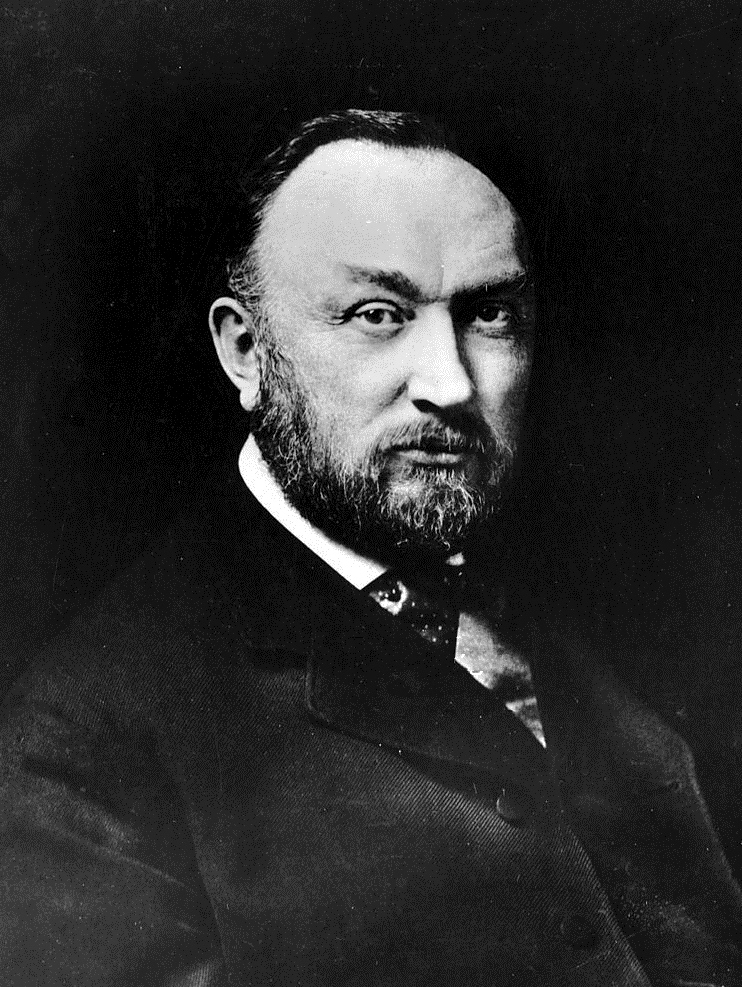
Edward Charles Pickering

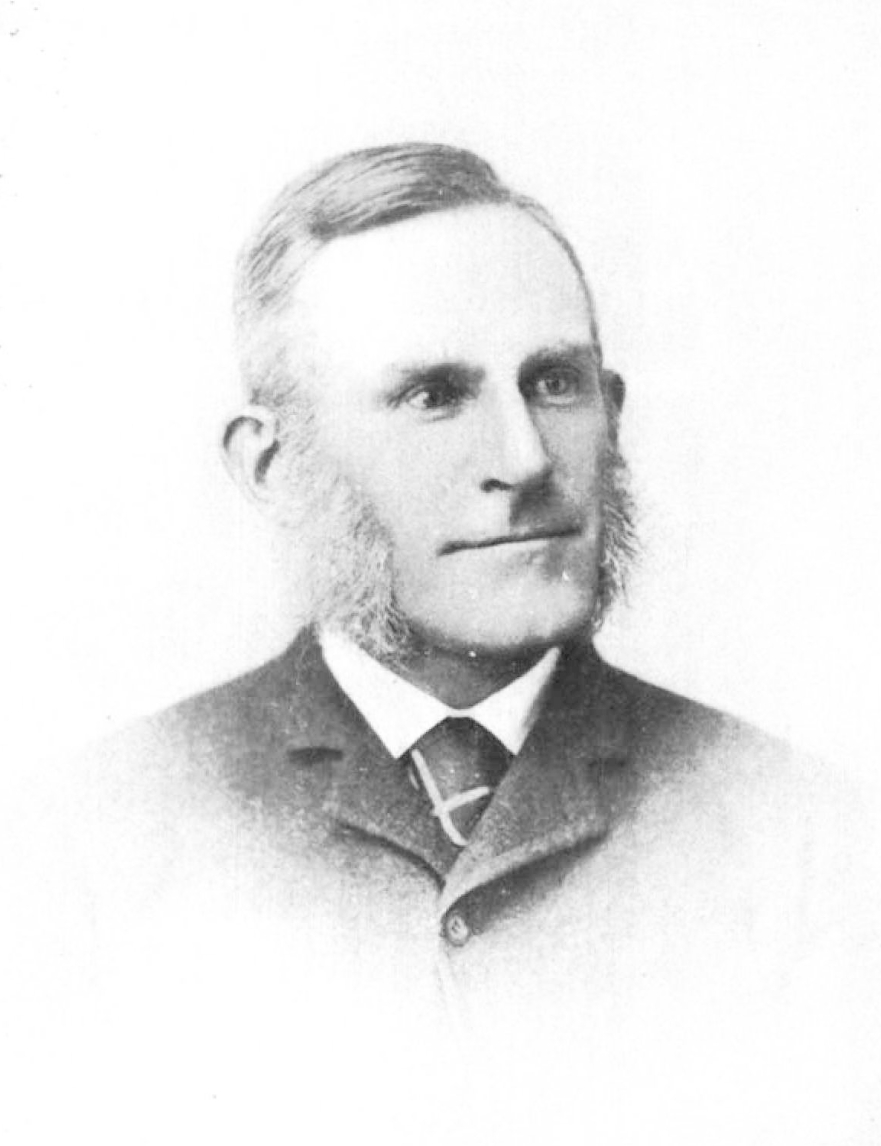
Samuel Hubbard Scudder

=== Other members ===
- Julian Granberry

== See also ==
- International Association for Near-Death Studies
- Institut suisse des sciences noétiques
- Parapsychological Association
- Outline of parapsychology
