= Haunted house =

House or other building perceived as being inhabited by spirits

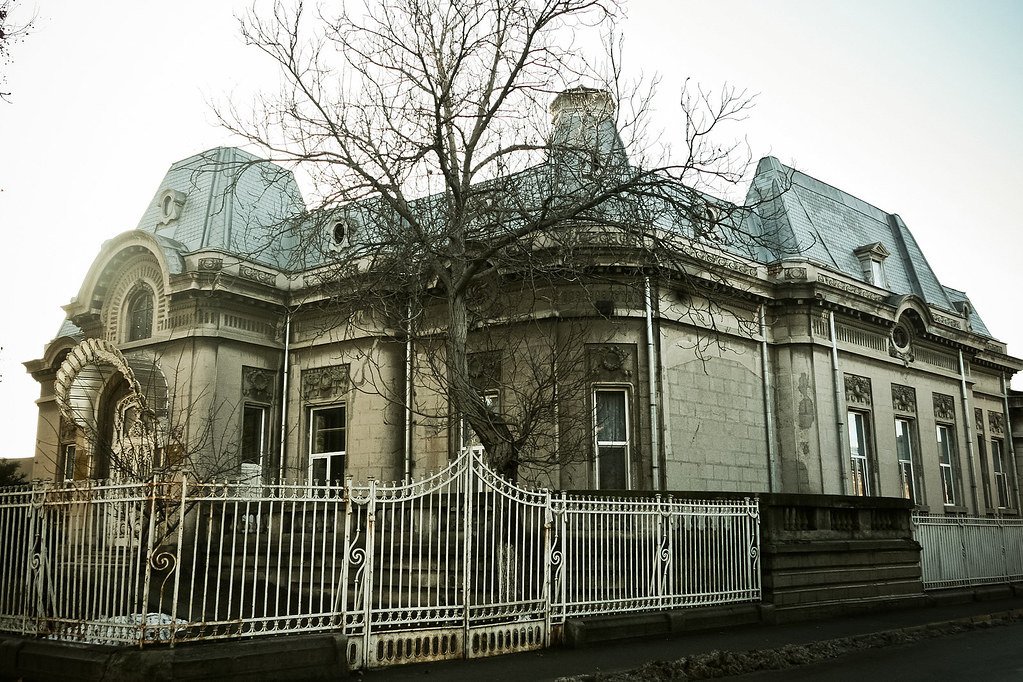
Casa Jean Troianos, known as the "House with Ghosts", in Brăila, Romania

A haunted house, spook house or ghost house is a house or other building often perceived as being inhabited by disembodied spirits of the deceased who may have been former residents or were otherwise connected with the property. In ghostlore, haunting is often attributed to the spirits of the dead who have suffered from violent or tragic events in the building's past such as murder, accidental death, or suicide.

Upon scientific investigation, alternative causes to supernatural phenomenon are found, such as hoaxes, environmental effects, hallucinations or confirmation biases. Common symptoms of hauntings, like cold spots and creaking or knocking sounds, can be found in most homes regardless of suspected paranormal presences. Carbon monoxide poisoning has also been cited as a cause of suspected hauntings.

== History ==
According to Owen Davies, a paranormal historian, hauntings in the British Isles were usually attributed to fairies, but today hauntings are usually associated with ghostly or supernatural encounters. In other cultures around the world, various spirits are said to haunt vacant homes and locations. In Middle Eastern countries, for example, jinn are said to haunt such areas. Historically, since most people died in their homes, whether they were mansions or hovels, these homes allegedly became natural places for ghosts to haunt, with bedrooms being the most common rooms to be haunted. Many houses gained a reputation for being haunted after they were empty or derelict. Davies explains that "if people were to fail to occupy a human space, then external forces would move in."

== Cultural attitudes to haunted houses ==
1921 silent film The Haunted House starring Buster Keaton. (house appears at 11:00 and later)

Haunting is one of the most common paranormal beliefs around the world, according to Benjamin Radford in his book Investigating Ghosts: The Scientific Search for Spirits. He says that almost every town and city has at least one "haunted" place; and that, despite over 100 years of investigation, there has not been a "single verifiable fact about ghosts having been established."

In the first century AD, the Roman author and statesman Pliny the Younger recorded a ghost story in his letters, which became famous for their vivid account of life during the heyday of the Roman Empire. Pliny reported that the specter of an old man with a long beard, and rattling chains, was haunting his house in Athens. The Greek writer Lucian and Pliny's fellow Roman Plautus also wrote memorable ghost stories.

In a 2005 Gallup poll, 37% of Americans, 28% of Canadians, and 40% of Britons believed that houses could be haunted. In a 2009 Pew Research Center survey, about 29% of Americans believed they had been in touch with someone who had died. According to a Research Co. poll released in 2020, 40% of Canadian women and 25% of Canadian men stated they believed in haunted houses.

In Japan, there is a tradition, linked to Buddhism, of creating obakeyashiki (Japanese: お化け屋敷) (ghost houses) in August, when it is believed that ancestral spirits may visit. People go to ghost houses to listen to frightening stories or seek elaborate decorations and costumes to experience shivers as a way to feel cooler in the hot summer temperatures.

The Shanghai Disneyland Park planners decided against building The Haunted Mansion because of the local cultural beliefs about ghosts and hauntings. Building the house would have been considered a mockery of their fear.

In Wuhan, China, the police have built a haunted house to train their police force by testing their nerves. They filled a dilapidated house with faked severed limbs, bones, skulls and a frightening atmosphere that includes lightning and rain. The house is also open to the public.

During the COVID-19 pandemic, in 2020, Indonesian lawmakers of the Sragen region on the island of Java decided to lock people who did not follow quarantine guidelines in abandoned and supposedly haunted houses. It was an attempt to motivate a superstitious population when science failed to do so.

== Proposed causes ==
According to Owen Davies's book, The Haunted: a Social History of Ghosts, "[e]ven the most devout believers in ghosts over the centuries recognized that many hauntings were frauds." In an interview with USA Today, Davies states that "[f]or skeptics in the past and present, the house was obviously the center of hauntings because it was where people slept and dreamed of the dead, or where people lay drunk, drugged or hallucinating in their sickbeds." Such basic poltergeist phenomena as rapping or knocking were very easy to orchestrate with the help of accomplices or a variety of ploys. According to science writer Terence Hines, cold spots, creaking sounds, and odd noises are typically present in any home, especially older ones, and "such noises can easily be mistaken for the sound of footsteps by those inclined to imagine the presence of a deceased tenant in their home."

A sensed-presence effect, the feeling that there is someone else present in a room, is known to happen when people experience monotony, darkness, cold, hunger, fatigue, fear, and sleep deprivation.

Skeptical investigator Joe Nickell writes that in most cases he investigated, he found plausible explanations for haunting phenomena, such as physical illusions, waking dreams, and the effects of memory. According to Nickell, the power of suggestion along with confirmation bias plays a large role in perceived hauntings. He states that as a house, inn, or other place becomes thought of as haunted, more and more ghostly encounters are reported and that when people expect paranormal events, they tend to notice conditions that would confirm their expectations. Many places deemed to be haunted are purposefully left in a decrepit condition, with wall paper peeling off, old carpeting, and antique decor.

Toxicologist Albert Donnay believes that chronic exposure to substances such as carbon monoxide, pesticide, and formaldehyde can lead to hallucinations of the type associated with haunted houses. Donnay speculates on the connection between the prevalence of gas lamps, during the Victorian era and start of the twentieth century, as well as stories of ghost sightings and hauntings, describing it as the "Haunted House Syndrome". Donnay says that carbon monoxide poisoning has been linked to haunted houses since at least the 1920s. He cites a 1921 journal article about a family who claimed hauntings because they suffered headaches, auditory hallucinations, fatigue, melancholy, and other symptoms which are also associated with carbon monoxide poisoning. In a modern example, Carrie Poppy, a writer and co-host of the podcast Oh No, Ross and Carrie!, was convinced she was living in a haunted house. She felt she was being watched by a demon, experienced pressure on her chest and auditory hallucinations. Someone on a forum of skeptical paranormal investigators suggested she look into carbon monoxide poisoning. When the gas company arrived, unsafe levels of carbon monoxide were found.

Michael Persinger, an American-Canadian professor of psychology, suggested that perceived apparitions, cold spots, and ghostly touches are perceptual anomalies caused by variations in naturally occurring or man-made magnetic fields. However, a study by psychologist Chris French that attempted to replicate Persinger's findings found no link.

== Investigating haunted phenomena ==
Investigations of supposed hauntings often result in simple explanations. For example, in an apparent haunted house in Somerset, England, in the eighteenth century, a boy would make the house shake by jumping on a beam in an adjoining property that ran through both houses. In 1857, a twelve-year-old girl confessed to tying her long hair around objects to give them the ghostly appearance of moving on their own. Tina Resch, a girl from Columbus, Ohio, who claimed that ghostly and paranormal activity occurred in her home, was photographed throwing a telephone while acting surprised at the sudden poltergeist activity.

Ben Radford, of the Committee for the Scientific Investigation of Claims of the Paranormal, performed an investigation in 2003 on an allegedly haunted house in Buffalo, New York. The owner of the home, called Tom in the article (pseudonym), alleged that he felt tapping on his foot at night. As described by Tom, "I get a tapping on my feet, not a repetitive tap, a trying-to-wake-you-up tap… After the tapping, if I don't pay attention to it, then I feel a kick." Radford suggests the tapping was likely a case of "hypnagogic hallucination (a sensory illusion that occurs in the transition to sleep), a fairly common phenomenon that can easily lead to misperceptions." His wife, called Monica (pseudonym), also claimed to feel tapping similar to Tom. According to Radford, "that can be explained by suggestion and what psychologists term folie à deux, when one person (often a spouse) takes on the symptoms of another." Tom also describes that "it will kick the bed—it will hit the side of the bed. I feel my whole body move… Then if I go back to sleep, I start to get a sound sleep, that's when it kicks again." Radford suggests his was likely due to restless leg syndrome in which a leg jerk in the middle of the night caused the bed to shake. Radford suggests that the owner's diagnosis of "sleep apnea is even further evidence for this explanation; restless legs (Restless Leg Syndrome) is actually one of the most common symptoms of apnea." Tom and Monica also heard ghostly music and voices, noises that they recorded from the top of the stairs, causing them to leave their home in fright. Radford conducted an experiment where he set the recording device in the same spot, turned it on, then walked outside with Tom, talking constantly. They returned to the house and listened to the tape. Their conversations could be clearly heard, though muffled. The couple then agreed that what they were hearing in their house previously were outside noises and not noises from the paranormal.

Another test done by Ben Radford in 2009 was to investigate the claim that batteries are drained by ghosts in haunted locations. He purchased four sets of identical batteries, sealed them in signed, Ziploc bags and wrapped them securely in strong tape to prevent tampering. He placed half of them in the reputed haunted Wolfe Manor, in Clovis, California, and half in a different location. Twenty four hours later he tested the batteries using a meter and discovered that there was no battery drainage in either location. Radford claims that simple, controlled experiments like this are important and should be conducted by ghost hunters to clearly demonstrate if there is a difference between a supposed haunted location and one that is not haunted.

== Famous haunted houses ==
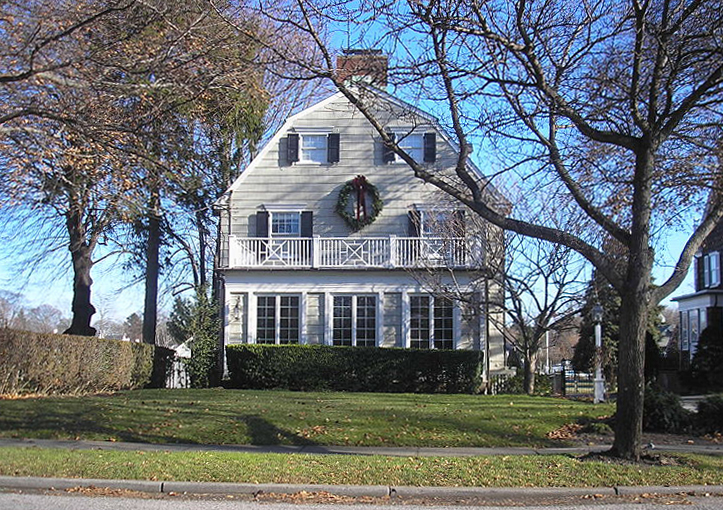
The house featured in the 1979 film The Amityville Horror and made famous by demonologists Ed and Loraine Warren, built c. 1924. By the time this photograph was taken, the address had been changed to discourage ghost hunters.

A house in Amityville, on Long Island, New York, became the subject of books and films after apparent hauntings following the murder of the DeFeo family. The Lutz family purchased the home for a greatly reduced price but shortly after moving in claimed that doors were ripped open, damaging hinges and bending locks, windows were suddenly opened, green slime oozed from the ceiling and cloven-hooved footprints were left in the snow. The Lutzes remained in the home for only 28 days. In a court case where the Lutzes were sued, they admitted that almost everything in the 1977 book The Amityville Horror was fictional.

Borley Rectory, in England, was considered the most haunted house in the world, but its notoriety was deemed to have been created (or at least exaggerated) by Harry Price, an expert magician and proven hoaxer.

Corvin Castle in Romania is considered one of the world's top five haunted places. According to locals, it has been haunted by its former occupant, Vlad the Impaler, ever since he was killed in an ambush. It is also said to be haunted by the spirits of people killed within its walls.

Casa Loma in Toronto, Canada, was completed in 1914. There have been rumors of ghosts there for many years. It is now a historic house museum and landmark that is decorated as a haunted house at Halloween.

The Winchester Mystery House in San Jose, California is considered one of the most haunted houses in America, although there are no primary sources for the many ghost stories about it. They were most likely inspired by Sarah Winchester, who had her strange, complex, often illogical designs incorporated into the house for almost four decades.

Wukang Mansion, a historical house in Shanghai, has a reputation for being haunted because of the large number of suicides of celebrities, intellectuals, and state-persecuted people there.

Government House and Phitsanulok Mansion in Bangkok are two government buildings, located near each other and built in Neo-Gothic style. Both date back to the reign of King Rama VI in the early 20th century. They were originally given by the king to his two favorite pages, who were brothers. During World War II, the buildings became government property and were later occupied by the Japanese army. There are persistent rumors that both buildings are haunted, especially Phitsanulok Mansion, which is often referred to as "Thailand's White House."

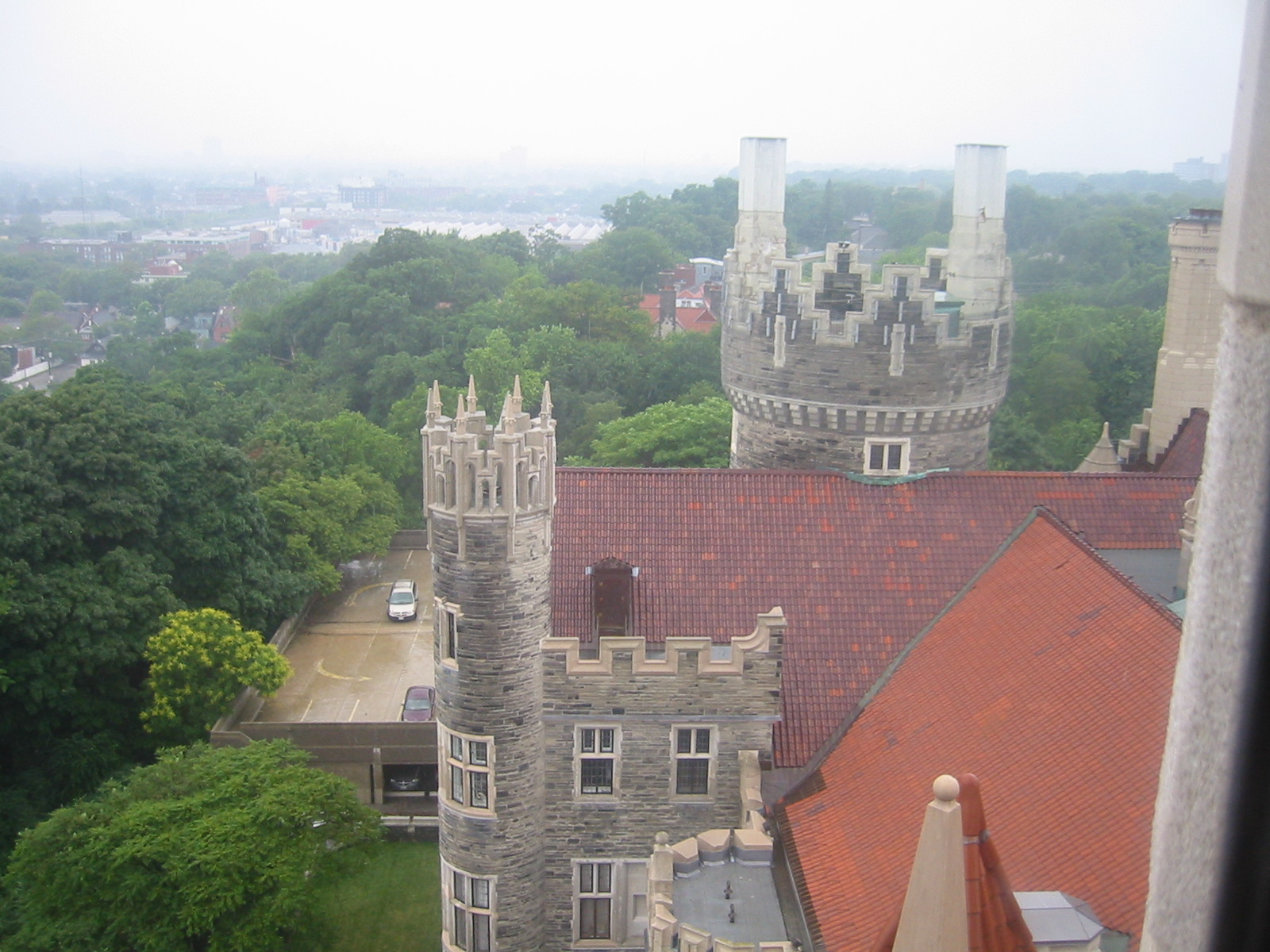
Casa Loma, Toronto.

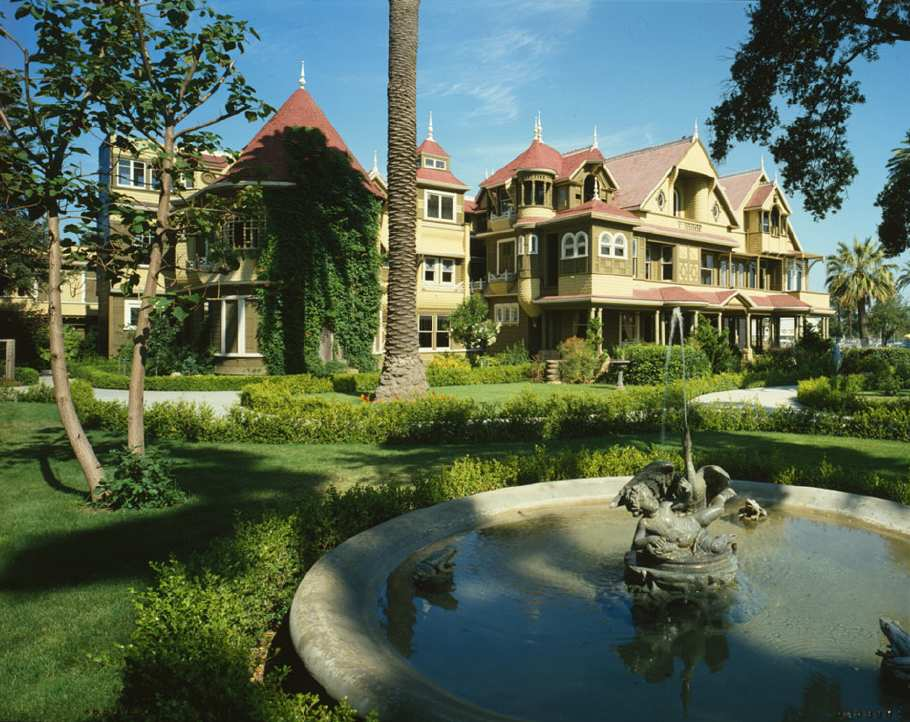
The Winchester Mystery House, San Jose.

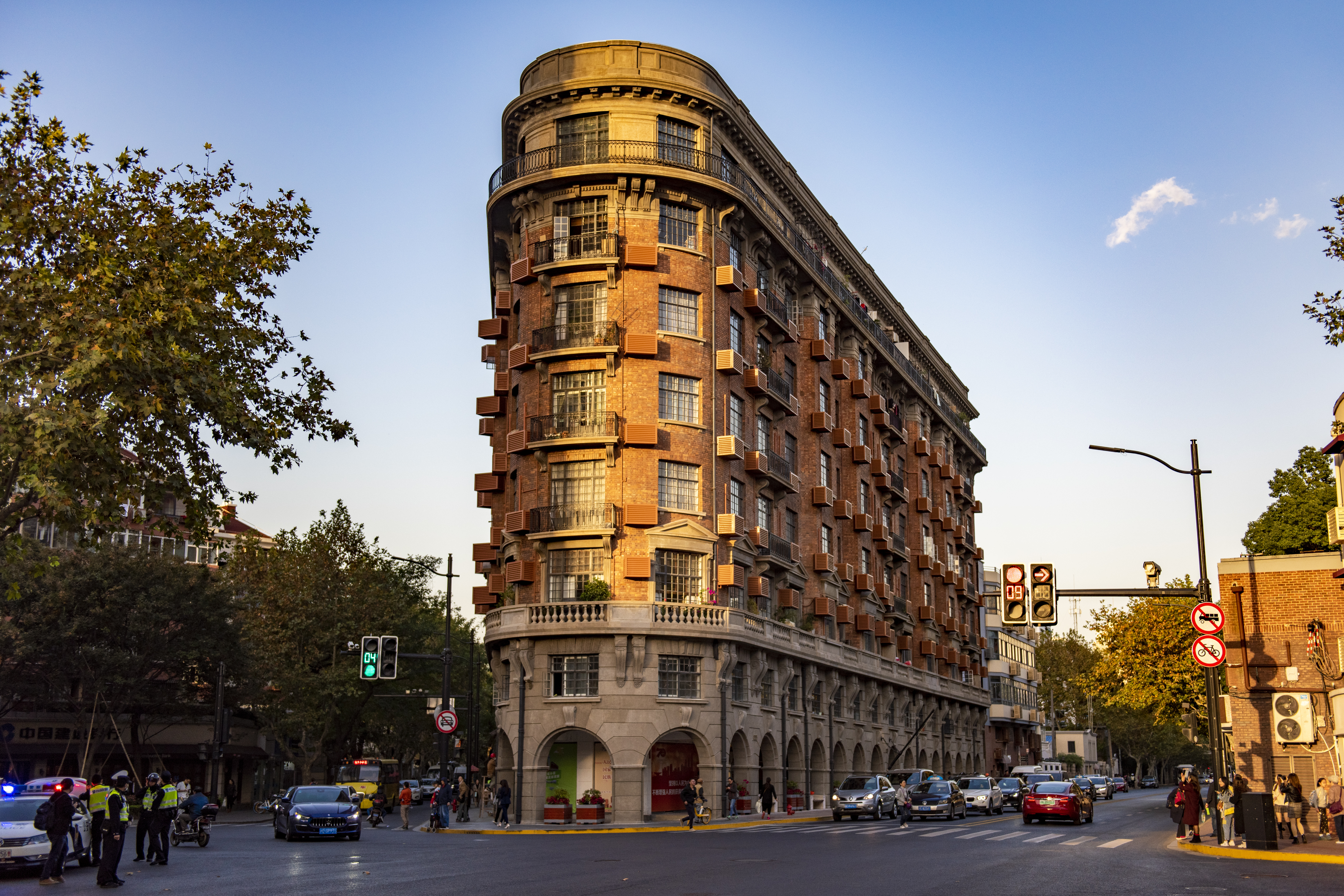
The Wukang Mansion, Shanghai.

== Halloween-themed haunted houses ==
Halloween themed "haunted houses" began appearing around the same time as "trick or treat", during the Great Depression, as a way to distract young people whose Halloween pranks had escalated to vandalism and harassment of passersby. These first exhibits were low quality, being put together by groups of families in their basements. People would travel from home to home to experience a variety of frightening situations, such as hearing weird moans and howls, cardboard cutouts of black cats, damp sponges and hair nets hanging from the ceiling to touch people's faces, hanging fur on the walls of darkened hallways, and having to crawl through long dark tunnels.

In 1972 Jerry Falwell and Liberty University introduced one of the first "hell houses" as an anti-Halloween attraction. Some Christian churches run these, which while being haunted houses, also promote their interpretation of the Christian gospel message. According to USA Today, in hell houses, "participants walk through several 'scenes' depicting the consequences of things like abortion, homosexuality and drunkenness."

== Commercial haunted houses ==
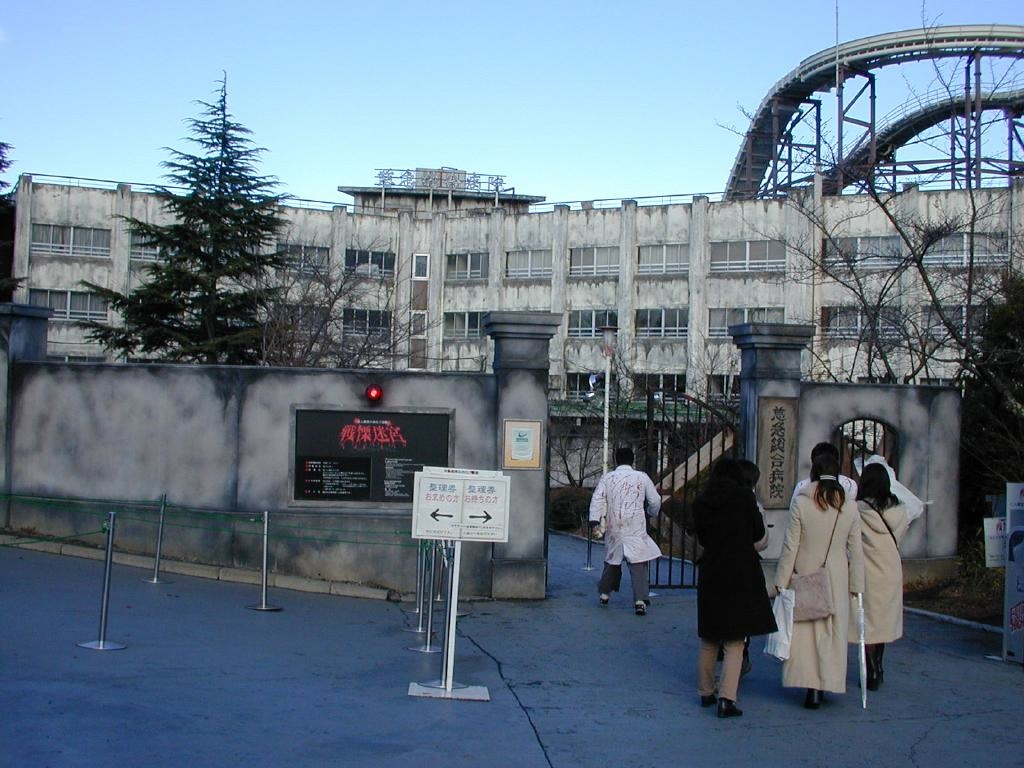
Fuji-Q – Super Scary Labyrinth of Fear, haunted hospital.

The concept of the haunted house was capitalized on as early as 1915 with the Orton and Spooner Haunted House in the Hollycombe Steam Collection (England). The haunted house became a cultural icon when Disneyland's Haunted Mansion was opened in 1969. By the 1970s, commercial haunted houses had sprung up all over the United States in cities like Louisville, Kentucky and Cincinnati, Ohio. These houses are stereotypically Gilded Age homes because changing tastes of the nouveau riche left these homes abandoned or poorly maintained.

Hollywood slasher films such as Halloween, A Nightmare on Elm Street and Friday the 13th had a large influence on commercial haunted houses in the 1980s and 1990s. Many of these houses included characters such as Freddy Krueger and Jason. A less popular film titled Monster House suggests the idea of a spirit actually taking control of a house and transforming it into an almost human body. By 2005, an estimated 3,500 to 5,000 professional haunted attractions operated in the United States.

Japanese commercial haunted houses, or obakeyashiki, are considered to be among the best in the world. Experiences include being chased by gore-covered zombies, specially themed attractions, such as schools or hospital wards, and houses from which one must escape within 60 minutes or be found by "slaughtering criminals". Claiming to be the world's largest and most frightening haunted house, the Super Scary Labyrinth of Fear at Fuji-Q Highland Amusement Park, in Yamanashi Fujiyoshida-shi Shinnishihara, depicts horrific visual scenes, shrill cries, moans, and smells. It has been visited by over four million people.

Haunted Attractions come in several different types from hayrides, indoor haunted houses to outdoor screamparks. Many amusement parks now host large Halloween events featuring haunted houses.

== Selling haunted houses ==
In the case Stambovsky v. Ackley, the Supreme Court of New York, Appellate Division, ruled in 1991 that a seller must disclose that a house has a reputation for being haunted because such a reputation may impair the value of the house:

In the case at bar, defendant seller deliberately fostered the public belief that her home was possessed. Having undertaken to inform the public at large, to whom she has no legal relationship, about the supernatural occurrences on her property, she may be said to owe no less a duty to her contract vendee.

In Hong Kong, where superstition is prevalent, people do not want to buy houses where anything unfortunate, especially an unnatural death, has occurred. For homes that are thought to be haunted, the prices are usually 15–20% below market value.

== Short stories and novels ==
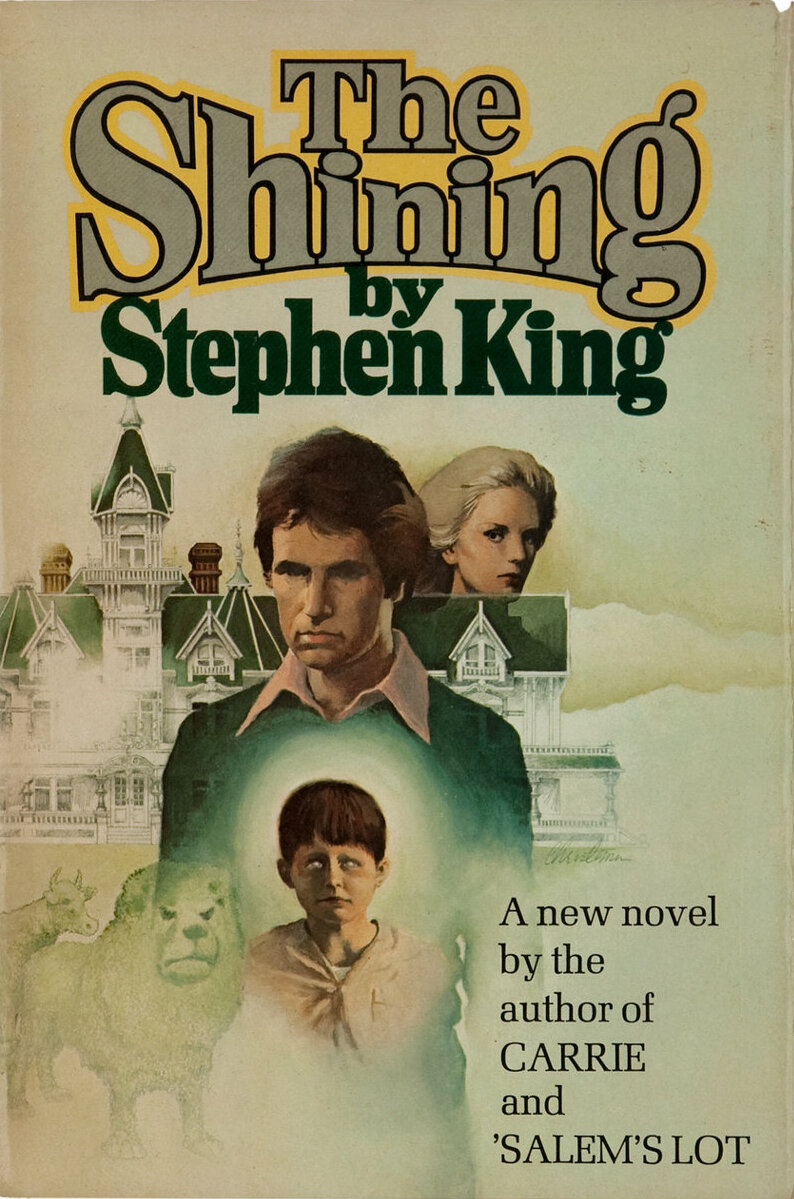
In the 1977 novel The Shining by Stephen King, an isolated mountain resort hotel serves as the haunted house of the story.

Legends about haunted houses have long appeared in the literature. The earliest surviving report of a haunted house comes from a letter written by Pliny the Younger (61 – c. 112 CE) to his patron Lucias Sura, in which he describes a haunted villa in Athens. Nobody would live in the house until the philosopher Athenodorus (c. 74 BCE – 7 CE) arrived in the city. He was tempted by the low rent and undeterred by the house's reputation so he moved in. The ghost, an old man bound with chains, appeared to Athenodorus during the first night and beckoned to him. The apparition vanished once it reached the courtyard, and Athenodorus carefully marked the spot. The following morning he requested the magistrate to have the spot dug up, where the skeleton of an old man bound with chains was discovered. The ghost never appeared again after the skeleton was given a proper burial.

Stories of haunted houses appear in the Arabian Nights, as in the tale of "Ali the Cairene and the Haunted House in Baghdad". The first gothic novel, The Castle of Otranto (1764) by Horace Walpole, is set in a haunted castle, as is "The Canterville Ghost", a humorous short story from 1887 by Oscar Wilde.

One of the most prominent twentieth-century books of the genre is the classic The Haunting of Hill House by Shirley Jackson, a finalist for the National Book Award in 1959. Other notable works of fiction featuring haunted houses include The Turn of the Screw (1897) by Henry James, Hell House (1971) by Richard Matheson, The Shining (1977) by Stephen King, and The House Next Door (1978) by Anne Rivers Siddons.

== See also ==
- Legend tripping
- List of ghosts
- List of reportedly haunted locations in the world
- Nang Ta-khian
- Spirit house
- Stigmatized property
