= Crime scene =

Location that may be associated with a committed crime

A crime scene is any location that may be associated with a committed crime. Crime scenes contain physical evidence that is pertinent to a criminal investigation. This evidence is collected by crime scene investigators (CSI) and law enforcement. The location of a crime scene can be the place where the crime took place or any area that contains evidence from the crime itself. Scenes are not only limited to a location, but can be any person, place, or object associated with the criminal behaviours that occurred.

Immediately after the discovery of a crime scene, measures must be taken to secure and protect the scene from contamination. To maintain the integrity of the scene, law enforcement must take action to block off the surrounding area as well as keep track of who comes in and who goes out. By taking these precautions, officers can ensure that evidence that is collected can be used in court. Evidence that has been contaminated or tampered with can pollute the scene and cause a case to be thrown out of court.

Everything that occurs during the analysis of a scene must be documented. It is the job of the initial responding officer to make sure that the scene has an extremely coherent and summarized documentation. The documentation should include the officer's observations and actions while at the scene. The initial responder is in charge of documenting the appearance and condition of the scene upon arrival. The initial responder will also gather statements and comments from witnesses, victims, and possible suspects. Several other documents are also generated so that a crime scene's integrity is kept intact. These documents include a list of who has been in contact with evidence (chain of custody), as well as a log of what evidence has been collected.

== Preservation and contamination ==
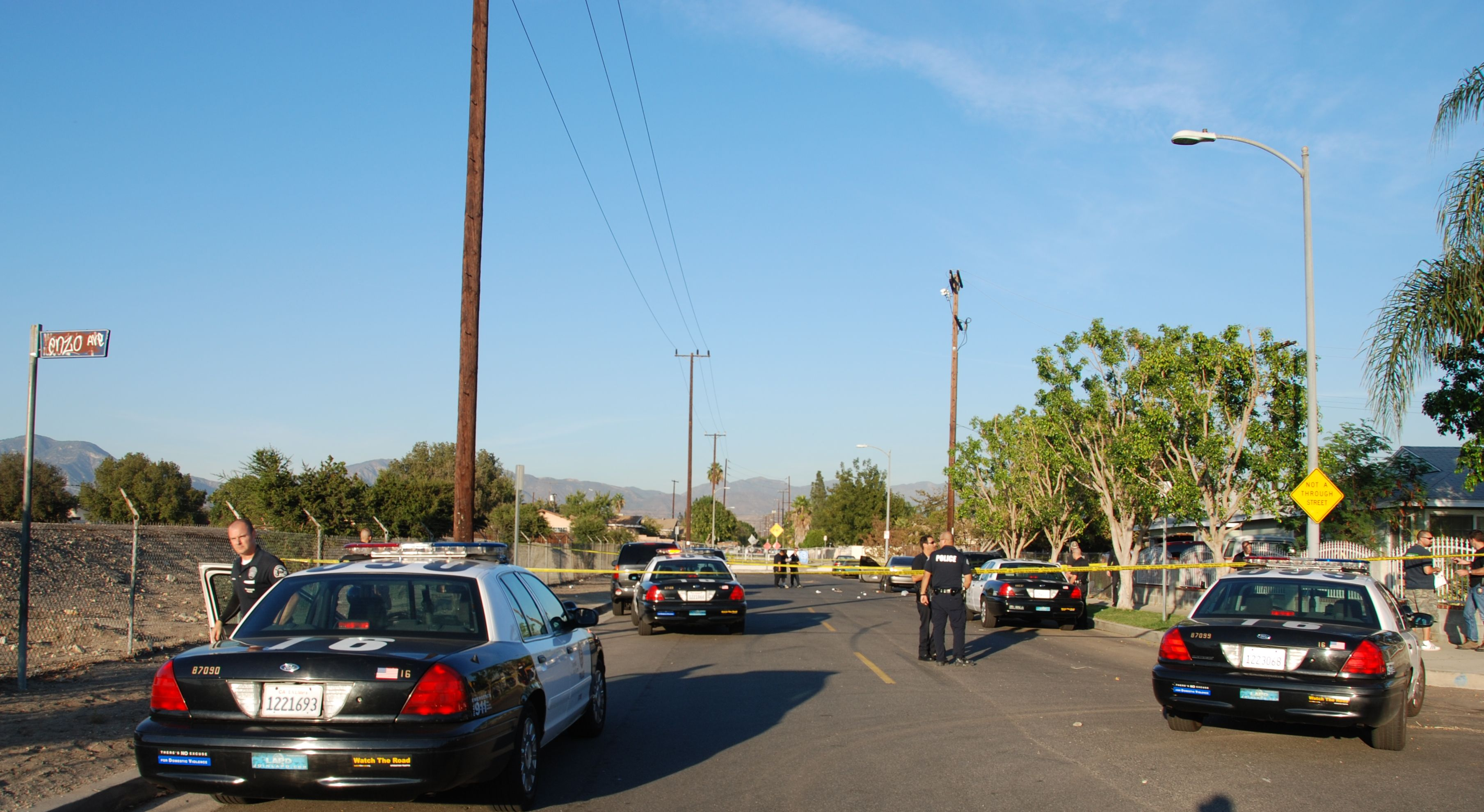
Police investigating the scene of a gang-related shooting in Los Angeles, California in October 2008

A crime scene is often preserved by setting up a blockade to control the movement in and out of a scene as well as maintaining the scene's integrity. A perimeter is taped off with barricade tape in order to keep only those necessary on-site. This is done to prevent contaminated evidence. While it is difficult to completely avoid contamination, many steps are taken to ensure the integrity of the crime scene remains intact. Officers take care to not eat, drink, smoke, or take their breaks near the crime scene. Anything leftover by the officers on the scene could be mistaken for potential evidence and tamper with the success of the investigation.

== Sequence of events ==
The initial responding officer receives a dispatch call and arrives at the location of the crime. This officer plays a crucial part in maintaining the integrity of the scene. Initial responders are in charge of securing the scene by setting up physical barriers to control the traffic in and around the area. The officer also documents their initial observations, as well as the condition of the scene upon arrival. Once the crime scene investigation unit arrives on the scene, an initial walkthrough is performed. This walkthrough helps the investigators get an understanding of what kind of crime has occurred. The unit notes on the presence of potential evidence and devises a plan for processing the scene.

A second walkthrough is performed for the purpose of documentation. The unit will take pictures and draw sketches of the scene. Sometimes videos are taken to ensure every detail of the crime is documented. After thorough documentation has been conducted, the CSI unit carefully collects all items that could be considered the evidence. These items are tagged, logged, and packaged to ensure nothing is damaged or lost. All evidence from the scene is sent to the forensic laboratory for analysis. The forensic laboratory processes all pieces of evidence from the scene. Once the results are in, they go to the lead detective on the case.

== Documentation ==
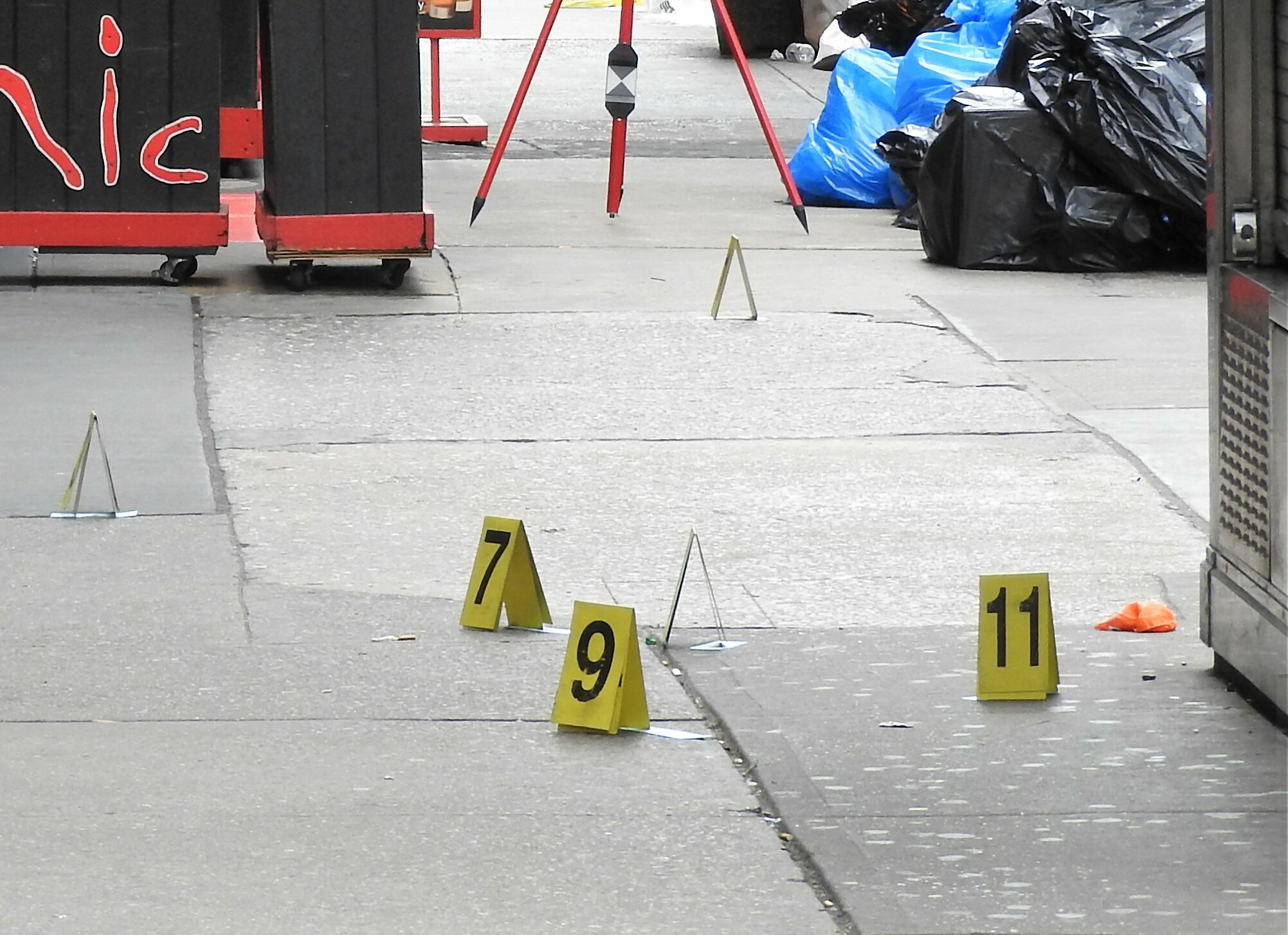
Numbered evidence markers at a crime scene in Manhattan, New York City in December 2017

Photographs of all evidence are taken before anything is touched, moved, or otherwise further investigated. Evidence markers are placed next to each piece of evidence allowing for the organization of the evidence.

Sketching the scene is also a standard form of documentation at a crime scene. Crime scene sketches allow for notes to be taken as investigators may take measurements and other data that may not be easily detected from only a photograph. The investigators will draw out locations of evidence and all other objects in the room. The sketch is usually drawn from a bird's-eye view, though other perspectives, such as two-point perspective, are also used. Notes are taken by investigators to ensure the memorization of their thoughts and suspicions about different pieces of evidence.

== Evidence collection ==
Evidence comes in many different forms such as guns, blood on knives, etc. It can be anything from a biological sample like blood or everyday items like receipts or bank statements. Other types of evidence include fibers, firearm residue, photographs or videos, and fingerprints. Forensic scientists analyze this evidence so they can come up with an explanation for why and how a crime occurred. Ensuring that evidence is collected in an accurate and timely manner helps officers to better understand what happened at the scene and aids in the investigation being completed successfully. Only the appropriate personnel with the proper knowledge and training should be collecting evidence. These individuals include First responders, Crime Scene Investigators, and other specialized personnel. Different types of evidence will sometimes need different methods of collection or specific containers. For instance, paper containers, such as bags, envelopes, or boxes, may be optimal for biological samples. Paper containers allow evidence that is not completely dry to continue drying. This type of collection protects those samples from deteriorating. When the evidence is collected properly there is less of a chance that the items collected will be damaged or contaminated.

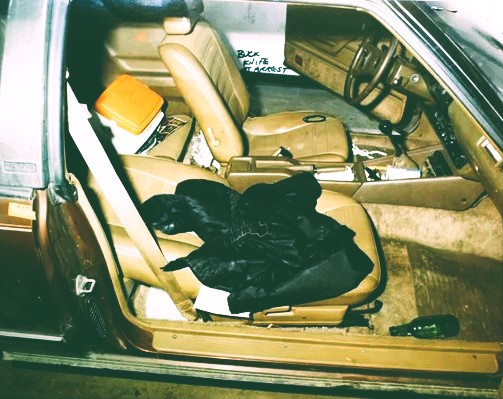
The interior of serial killer Randy Kraft's Toyota Celica, as photographed by the Orange County Sheriff's Department. Kraft had been arrested hours previous with the body of his final victim within his vehicle.

The development of forensics has improved the level of crimes being solved. Whenever first responders respond to crime scenes they are with people of different expertise. These people have different tools that allow them to collect evidence. There is trace evidence such as hairs, soil, fingerprints, footprints, shoe prints, gunpowder residue, glass fragments, carpet fibers, and similar items that are vital to crime scene processing. Depending on the crime scene, technicians will determine what equipment is needed to appropriately respond to the scene. Forensic experts deploy a variety of different tools and techniques. Fingerprint collection through the use of grey or black magnetic powder. DNA and other bodily fluids are collected and, whether it is hair or fluid, for further examination in a lab. Shoe and tire prints can be collected using dental stone. Electronics are taken for examination by a technical expert to search for further evidence. Documents from the area are also taken for further examination. Ammunition and weapons are taken for matching to wounds and ballistics. Photographs of tool marks are taken because they can be matched to a weapon at a later time. Any other trace evidence is also collected. Trace evidence is anything left behind by a perpetrator or could have been transferred to the perpetrator. Interviews of both witnesses and victims of the crime are taken by law enforcement officials to gain knowledge and creating a timeline of events.

Chromatography is a science that separates mixtures to their original compound and allows for them to be identified. This is useful when trying to determine whether someone died a natural death or was poisoned. Depending on the evidence collected determines the procedure that will be used- thin layer, gas, or paper chromatography which are specific ways to separate compounds.

Fingerprints (which also include palm prints and footprints) are another type of evidence that can tie individuals to crime scenes. Collecting fingerprints is a crucial process and should be one of the first things conducted when investigators arrive at the crime scene. If a print is not able to be lifted then photographs of the prints are acceptable. Fingernails are also part of evidence collection because they have striations on them which are individual characteristics. Fingernails should be collected and placed in a paper packet then placed in a paper envelope and labelled for processing.

=== Chain of custody ===
After the evidence has been collected from the scene of the crime, it is placed in its appropriate container and then is labelled or tagged. The tag identifies the specific scene the evidence came from and establishes the "chain of custody". The chain of custody refers to the order in which evidence is handled by individuals who are involved in the case's investigation. The chain of custody is pertinent to the investigation and guarantees the physical security of all evidence that is part of the case. The following types of identifiers are needed to establish the chain:

- Initials or names of the person collecting the evidence, and all the subsequent people who have and will come in contact with the evidence.
- The date of collection and transfer
- The name of the agency, case number, and type of crime
- Voucher or property clerk number
- The name of the victim or suspect
- Where the item is being stored
- A summary of what the item is

== Types of crime scenes ==
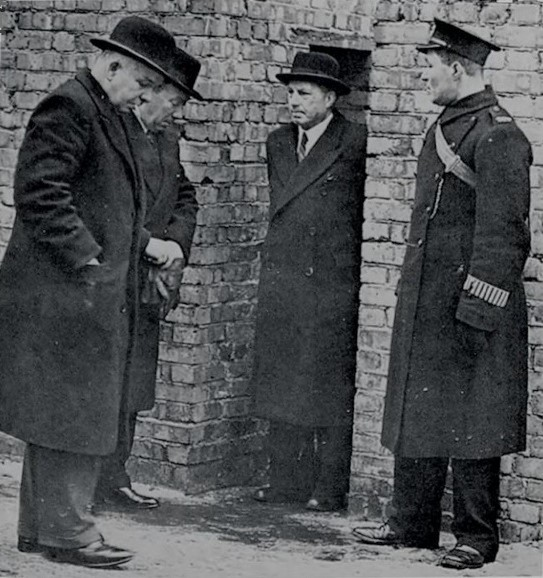
Investigators converge at a crime scene in Marylebone, London, in February 1942. The body of the first victim of serial killer Gordon Cummins was discovered at this location.

Different types of crime scenes include outdoors, indoor, and conveyance. Outdoor crime scenes are the most difficult to investigate. The exposure to elements such as rain, wind, or heat, as well as animal activity, contaminates the crime scene and leads to the destruction of evidence. Other factors such as not properly securing the crime scene can lead to contamination of evidence. If a crime were committed outdoors and indoors then the outdoor crime scene is the priority. It is very difficult to process outdoor crime scenes at night. Regardless of the lighting used to enhance visibility, it is detrimental to the evidence. This can cause for loss and destruction of evidence, therefore if at all possible it is best to preserve a crime scene for daylight processing.

Indoor crime scenes have a significantly lower chance of contamination because of the lack of exposure. The contamination here usually comes from the people factor. Conveyance crime scenes are crimes committed utilizing transportation, such as robbery, grand theft, carjacking, sexual battery, and homicide. Each type of crime scene, along with the nature of the crime committed (robbery, homicide, rape, etc.) have different procedures. When conveyance crime scenes are being investigated it is important to look beyond the conveyance itself. An example of this would be footprints or shoe impressions of someone fleeing a scene and the track of could leave evidence that the suspect pick up at the scene, such as soil, rocks, or sand.

== Reconstruction ==
Crime scene reconstruction is the use of scientific methods, physical evidence, and deductive reasoning to gain explicit knowledge of the series of events that surround the commission of a crime. Crime scene reconstruction helps aid in the arrest of suspects and prosecute in the court of law. Crime scene reconstruction is more than a crime scene reenactment, it involves more of a comprehensive approach and is dedicated to finding a final resolution. Crime scene reconstruction help put pieces of a case together. The steps to crime scene reconstruction involve: the initial walk-through and examination of the crime scene, organizing an approach for collecting evidence, formulate a theory, use the theory to track down suspects, reconciling all evidence that refutes the hypothesis or creates one.

== See also ==
- Crime scene cleanup
- DNA analysis
- Evidence management
- Forensic analysis
- Forensic science
- Forensic photography
- Law enforcement
- Problem property
