= William Roll =

William Roll may refer to:

- William G. Roll (1926–2012), American psychologist and parapsychologist
- William Roll (diplomat) (1892–1967), American diplomat
