= Contaminated evidence =

Foreign material introduced post-crime

Contaminated evidence is any foreign material that is introduced to a crime scene after the crime is committed. Contaminated evidence can be brought in by witnesses, suspects, victims, emergency responders, fire fighters, police officers and investigators.

Juries expect to see forensic evidence before they render a verdict based on that evidence. Because of this, attorneys on both sides try to discredit forensic evidence that does not support their clients' interests. This requires crime scene investigators be especially careful to guard against contamination in the forensic samples. A miscarriage of justice can occur when these procedures are not carried out carefully and accurately.

== Avoiding contamination ==
=== Evaluation of the crime scene ===
Evaluating a scene before anyone enters can be key to keeping contamination to a minimum. The examination of the scene will usually begin with a walk-through of the area along the "trail" of the crime. The trail is that area in which all apparent actions associated with the crime took place. The trail is usually marked by the presence of physical evidence. This may include the point of entry, the location of the crime, areas where a suspect may have cleaned up, and the point of exit. In some cases, a walk-through may become secondary if potential evidence is in danger of being destroyed. In that case, this evidence should be preserved or documented, and collected as quickly as possible.

=== Protecting the crime scene ===
The most important aspect of evidence collection and preservation is protecting the crime scene. This is to keep the pertinent evidence uncontaminated until it can be recorded and collected. Eating, drinking, or smoking should never be allowed at a crime scene. A command post should be set up for such purposes. The post is to be set up somewhere outside the restricted areas. It could be a vehicle, picnic table, hotel room, tent, etc. It can be used as a gathering place for non-involved personnel, a place for investigators to take breaks, eat, drink, or smoke, a communication center, a place for press conferences, a central intelligence area, etc.

Protection of the crime scene also includes the protection of the crime scene investigators. Whether a civilian or a police crime scene investigator, one person should never be left alone while processing the scene. This is especially true if the suspect has not been apprehended. There are many stories of suspects still hiding at or near their area of misdeed. That is why there should always be at least two people working the scene. At least one of these people should have a radio and a firearm.

=== Documentation of the crime scene ===
The taping should begin with a general overview of the scene and the surrounding area. The taping should continue throughout the crime scene using wide-angle, close up, and even macro (extreme close up) shots to demonstrate the layout of the evidence and its relevance to the crime scene.

The final phase in documenting the scene is making a crime scene sketch. The drawback of photographs is that they are two-dimensional representations of three-dimensional objects. As a result, most photographs can distort the spatial relationships of the photographed objects causing items to appear closer together or farther apart than they actually are. If spatial relationships of the evidence are important or if something needs to have proportional measurements included in it for calculations (such as bullet trajectory angles, accident reconstructions, etc.), then a sketch must be made of the crime scene.

=== Collection of evidence ===
Once the crime scene has been thoroughly documented and the locations of the evidence noted, then the collection process can begin. Most items of evidence will be collected in paper containers such as packets, envelopes, and bags. Liquid items can be transported in non-breakable, leakproof containers. Arson evidence is usually collected in air-tight, clean metal cans. Only large quantities of dry powder should be collected and stored in plastic bags. Moist or wet evidence (blood, plants, etc.) from a crime scene can be collected in plastic containers at the scene and transported back to an evidence receiving area if the storage time in plastic is two hours or less, and this is done to prevent contamination of other evidence.

Once in a secure location, wet evidence, whether packaged in plastic or paper, must be removed and allowed to air dry completely. That evidence can then be repackaged in a new, dry paper container. Under no circumstances should evidence containing moisture be packaged in plastic or paper containers for more than two hours. Moisture allows the growth of microorganisms which can destroy or alter evidence. Any items which may cross-contaminate each other must be packaged separately. The containers should be closed and secured to prevent the mixture of evidence during transportation. Each container should have the collecting person's initials, the date and time it was collected; a complete description of the evidence and where it was found; and the investigating agency's name and file number.

=== Tools ===
Not only is the actual crime scene as a whole important to protect in order to avoid contamination the tools used pose just as big of a threat. Simple measures can be taken by an investigator to ensure the integrity of DNA evidence. Tools can easily transfer DNA from one crime scene to another. Fingerprint brushes, for example, can retain the DNA they pick up and create contaminated evidence. In order to ensure there will not be a transfer of DNA on brushes, they should not be reused. Each scene should get a new one. This tip is especially important in situations like homicide cases, where DNA is a crucial factor. Paying the extra six to nine dollars for an extra brush may be the difference in contaminated evidence and alleviating questions.

Gloves are another tool that needs to be carefully handled at a crime scene. There is no guarantee that gloves will permit contamination. The key is to change gloves often. If one fails to do so, they can be contaminated by obvious reasons like touching blood and other fluids, but also simple movements such as covering your mouth when you sneeze and scratching your face. Like brushes, gloves are extremely cheap and should be disposed of and changed whenever they may have been compromised.

== Cases ==
Many trials involve highly technical testimony about the chemistry and biology of evidence and the physics of how it was analyzed. The goal should always be to eliminate questions before they become an issue; aim never to lose a case on a technicality. In cases that go to court, any unexplained evidence collected at the scene needs to be identified. Unidentified evidence such as latent fingerprints, shoe tracks, hair, blood, and DNA swabbing will need to be identified.

=== Adam Scott ===
Twenty-year-old Adam Scott was charged with the rape of a woman after his saliva came upon a plastic tray that was reused. Adam was a suspect in a street fight, and saliva samples had been taken from him. After a woman was attacked in Manchester, a tray with his evidence was reused when in fact, it should have been disposed of. This fault in a procedure by a worker at LGC caused Adam Scott to be jailed for five months before the mistake was later picked up on.

=== Time travel murder ===
A woman murdered in London in 1997 was taken to the lab for analysis. After searching under her fingernails, investigators found a match for another woman whom they suspected to be the killer. However, the woman who came up as a match had been murdered herself three weeks prior to the incident. Investigators were confused as they could not find any correlation between the two women. Finally, they came to the conclusion that the mix-up must somehow have stemmed from the forensics lab. After investigating the process in which the DNA was collected, they discovered that a single pair of scissors was used to cut both woman's nails. Although they were washed in between, there was still enough DNA to contaminate the scene.

=== Cory Carroll ===
Indicted for murder after his involvement in a head-on collision that killed one and injured himself and two others, Cory Carroll was released after evidence was determined not to be admissible. After taking a urine sample at the hospital, his results came back positive for high levels of THC. These results were invalid, however, because they were never sent to a state lab to be confirmed. After this, there was not enough evidence to charge Cory Carroll with the crime, and the case was dismissed.

== See also ==
- Forensic science
- Crime scene
- Forensic identification
