= Umair Haroon =

Pakistani TV producer and director

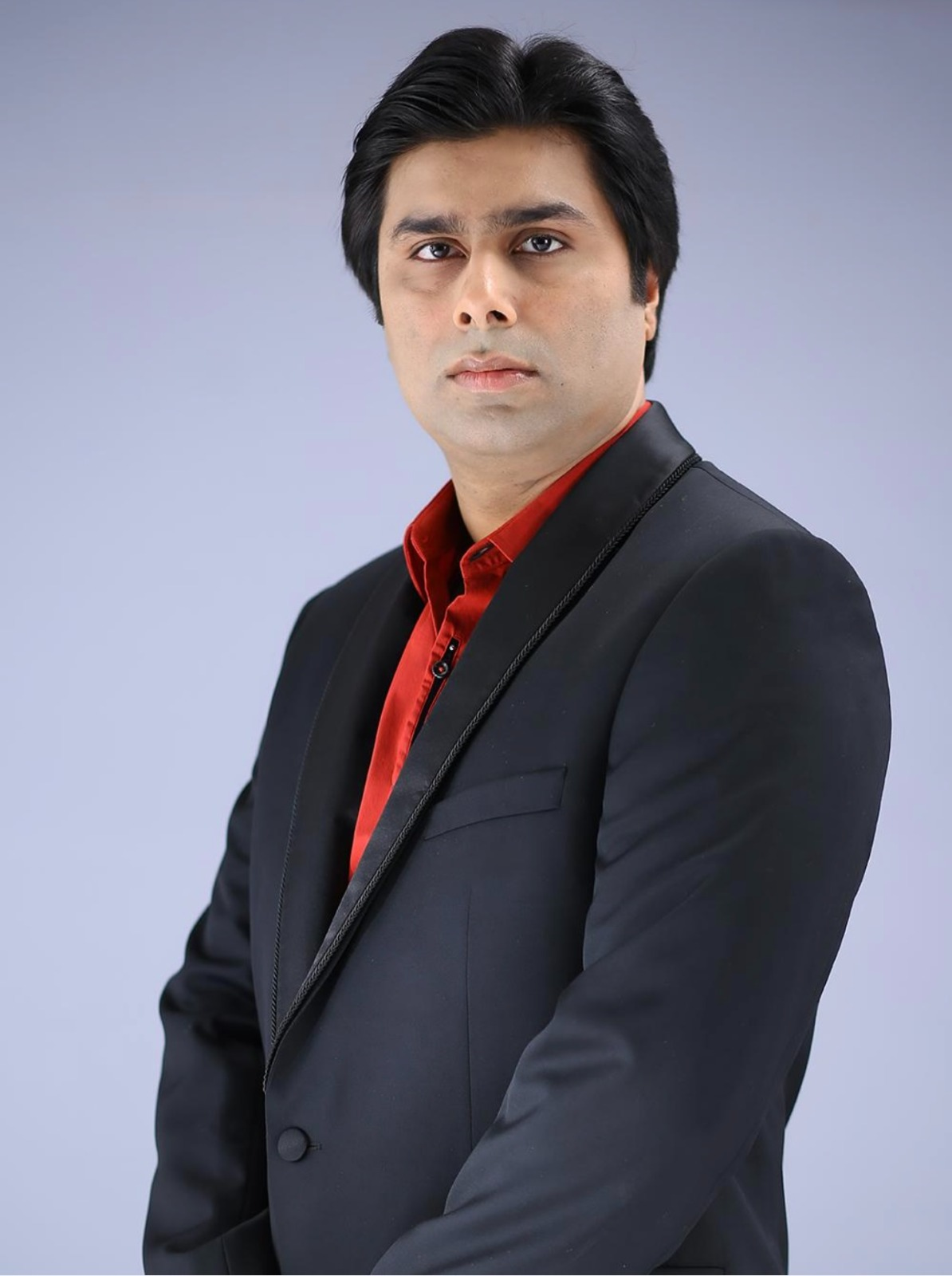
- Born: 22 November 1982 (age 43); Karachi, Pakistan
- Occupations: Director, producer, actor
- Years active: 2014–present
- Website: http://www.umairharoon.com/

Umair Haroon (born 22 November 1982) is a Pakistani television producer, director, and actor based in Karachi. He is a member of the International Academy of Television Arts and Sciences, the organisation that administers the International Emmy Awards.

== Education ==
Haroon obtained his Bachelor of Medicine, Bachelor of Surgery (MBBS) degree from Sindh Medical College in 2006. In 2015, he completed fellowship training in forensic medicine at Dow University of Health Sciences. He is reported to be the first Pakistani to pass the examination and earn Diplomate status from the American Board of Medicolegal Death Investigators. He later earned a master's degree in Public Health from the Shaheed Zulfikar Ali Bhutto Institute of Science and Technology.

== Career ==
Haroon serves as President of Metro One News and Executive Director of Voice of Sindh. According to the Associated Press of Pakistan, he has produced more than 200 media projects, including television dramas, short films, documentaries, and songs on topics relating to ethics, history, and social awareness. His works include Sindh Meri Jaan, Jinnah Tum Durust Thay, and Tareekh Kay Musafir. According to the Associated Press of Pakistan, he launched Pakistan's first forensic science-based investigative television series, though this claim has not been independently verified.

His publications include The Story of Indus Civilization.

In 2026, Haroon joined the jury for the 2026 International Emmy Awards Competition and was appointed as a jury member for the Asian Academy Creative Awards, serving in its national and international rounds.

== Awards and honours ==
- Sitara-e-Pakistan (2021) for best producer.
- Best Producer/Director of the Year, Corporate Social Responsibility (CSR) Leadership Conference & Awards (2022)
- Award for Distinguished Contribution to Legal, Forensic, and Scientific Awareness through Media, Karachi Bar Association (2025)
- Media Goodwill Ambassador, Indus Hospital & Health Network (2025)
- Pakistan Excellence Award 2026 in the category of “Outstanding Visionary in Media Production and Global Cultural Diplomacy”.
