= Crime reconstruction =

Forensic technique

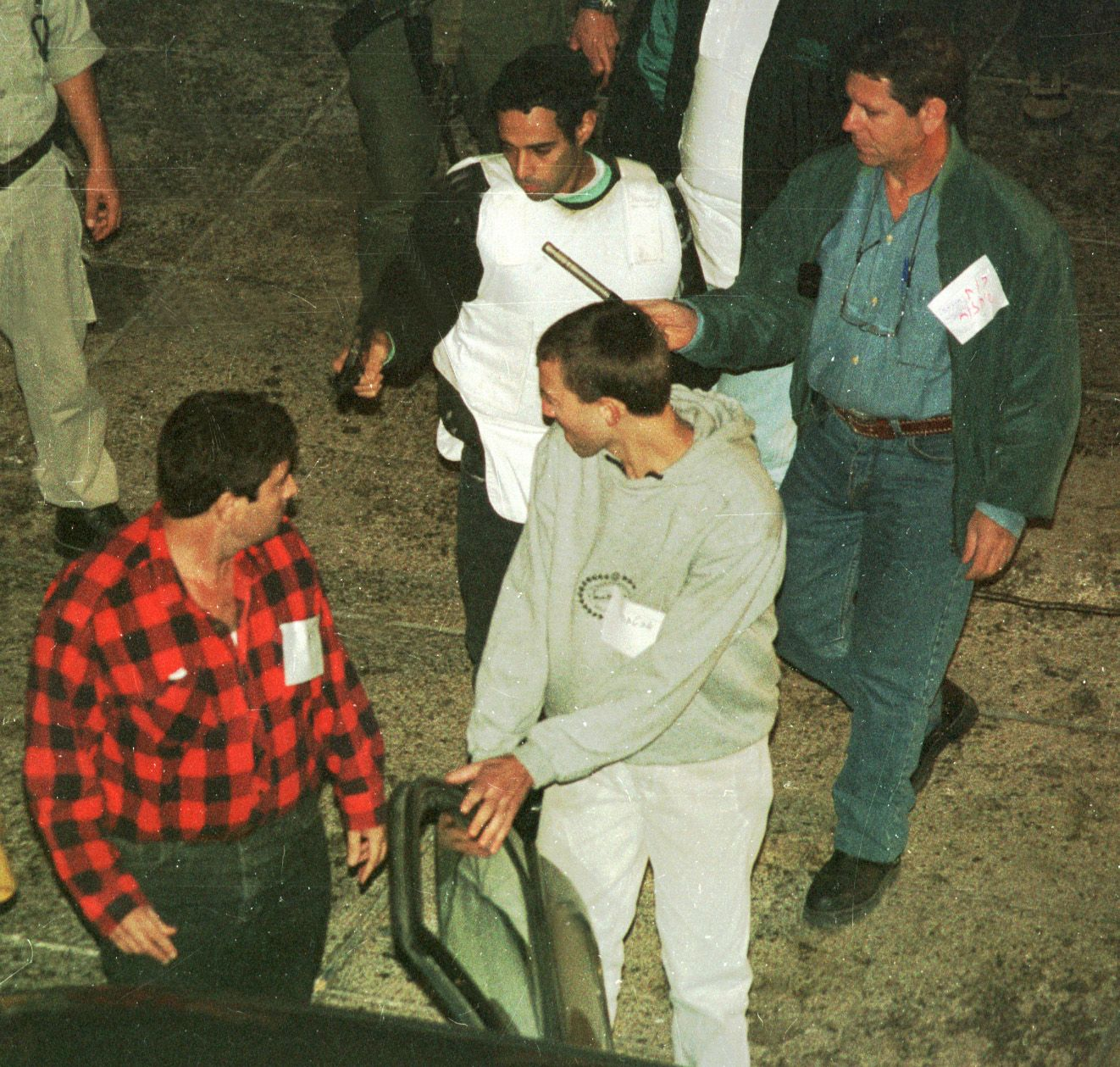

Crime reconstruction or crime scene reconstruction is the forensic science discipline in which one gains "explicit knowledge of the series of events that surround the commission of a crime using deductive and inductive reasoning, physical evidence, scientific methods, and their interrelationships". Gardner and Bevel explain that crime scene reconstruction "involves evaluating the context of a scene and the physical evidence found there in an effort to identify what occurred and in what order it occurred." Chisum and Turvey explain that "[h]olistic crime reconstruction is the development of actions and circumstances based on the system of evidence discovered and examined in relation to a particular crime. In this philosophy, all elements of evidence that come to light in a given case are treated as interdependent; the significance of each piece, each action, and each event falls and rises on the backs of the others."

== Methods ==
Crime scene reconstruction has been described as putting together a jigsaw puzzle but doing so without access to the box top; the analyst does not know what the picture is supposed to look like. Furthermore, not all of the pieces are likely to be present, so there will be holes in the picture. However, if enough pieces of a puzzle are assembled in the correct order, the picture may become clear enough that the viewer is able to recognize the image and answer critical questions about it.

In forensic science, there are three areas of importance in finding the answers and determining the components of a crime scene: (1) specific incident reconstruction, (2) event reconstruction, and (3) physical evidence reconstruction. Specific incident reconstruction deals with road traffic accidents, bombings, homicides, and accidents of any severity. Event reconstruction looks at connections between evidence, sequence of events, and identity of those involved. Physical evidence reconstruction focuses on such items as firearms, blood traces, glass fragments, and any other objects that can be stripped for DNA analysis.

== Expertise ==
To be competent as a crime scene reconstructionist, one must possess the requisite technical knowledge and have a thorough understanding of forensic investigations. There are no set educational requirements; however, many practicing crime scene reconstructionists possess undergraduate or graduate degrees in forensic science, chemistry, biology, physics, engineering, or criminal justice. In addition, a crime scene reconstructionist must have considerable experience in the investigation and analysis of crime scenes and physical evidence. Most crime scene reconstructionists have gained such experience either as a crime scene investigator, homicide investigator, or medicolegal death investigator.

Arguably, a crime scene reconstructionist is a forensic scientist who specializes in interpreting and assembling evidence in a coherent manner. Chisum and Turvey explain that to perform crime reconstruction one need not "be an expert in all forensic disciplines" but "must become an expert in only one: the interpretation of the evidence in context." The crime scene reconstructionist may not be the person who carries out laboratory analysis of evidence such as developing DNA profiles or performing firearms and toolmark analysis; however, the competent crime scene reconstructionist must understand the meaning of each various piece of evidence and how it fits within the overall context of the scene. In this way, the crime scene reconstructionist is able to assemble the necessary puzzle pieces to make the picture visible.

== Professional associations ==
The Association for Crime Scene Reconstruction was formed in 1991 by a group of crime scene professionals who "saw a need for an organization that would encompass an understanding of the whole crime scene and the necessity of reconstructing that scene in order to better understand the elements of the crime and to recognize and preserve evidence." The association publishes a peer-reviewed journal and holds an annual conference in which members gain information about the latest techniques and technologies used in crime scene reconstruction and share case examples. Many crime scene reconstructionists are also members of the International Association of Bloodstain Pattern Analysts, the American Academy of Forensic Sciences, and the International Association for Identification or one of its state chapters.

== Certification ==
The International Association for Identification (IAI) had previously offered the only nationally recognized Certified Crime Scene Reconstructionist program in the United States. Whilst the board continues to support their currently certified reconstructionists, the program has been suspended as of 21 March 2017 due to a lack of participants. To be eligible for certification, applicants must have a minimum of five years experience in the crime scene reconstruction field; must have completed a minimum of 120 hours of related professional training including coursework in bloodstain pattern analysis, shooting incident reconstruction, and other related areas; and, must meet other qualifications such as being published in a professional journal, presenting to a professional association, or being an active instructor in the field. Once approved by the board, applicants must pass a 300-question multiple choice examination and a series of practical questions involving actual analysis of crime scene evidence as presented in photographs. Certification is valid for five years. The IAI maintains a roster of certified crime scene reconstructionists on the organization's website.

== See also ==
- Crime reenactment
- Crime scene
- Forensic photography
- HemoSpat, HemoVision, Faro Zone 3D Bloodstain pattern analysis software
- Trace evidence
