= Stambovsky v. Ackley =

1991 US case about a haunted house

- New York Supreme Court, Appellate Division, First Department
- Seal of New York

Decided July 18, 1991
- Full case name: Jeffrey M. Stambovsky v. Helen Ackley and Ellis Realty
- Citations: 169 A.D.2d 254, 572 N.Y.S.2d 672, 60 USLW 2070
- Prior history: New York Supreme Court dismissed the action (April 9, 1990)

Main Holding
- Seller who had undertaken to inform the public at large about the existence of poltergeists on the premises to be sold was estopped to deny existence of poltergeists on the premises, so the house was haunted as a matter of law and seller must inform the purchaser of the haunting.

Court membership
- Presiding Justice: Milonas
- Associate Justices: Ross, Kassal, Smith, Rubin

Case opinion
- Decision by: Rubin
- Joined by: Ross, Kassal
- Dissent by: Smith, Milonas

Stambovsky v. Ackley, 169 A.D.2d 254 (N.Y. App. Div. 1991), commonly known as the Ghostbusters ruling, was a case in the New York Supreme Court, Appellate Division. The court held that a house, which the owner had previously advertised as haunted by ghosts, was legally haunted for the purpose of an action for rescission brought by a subsequent purchaser of the house. Because of its unique holding that "as a matter of law, the house is haunted", the case has been frequently printed in textbooks on contracts and property law and is widely taught in U.S. law school classes, as well as being cited by other courts.

== Facts and prior history ==
During the course of her ownership of the property at issue, which was located in Nyack, New York, Helen Ackley and members of her family had reported the existence of numerous poltergeists in the house. Ackley had reported the existence of ghosts in the house to both Reader's Digest and a local newspaper on three occasions between 1977 and 1989, when the house was included on a five-home walking tour of the city. She recounted to the press several instances in which the poltergeists interacted directly with members of her family. She claimed that grandchildren received "gifts" of baby rings, all of which suddenly disappeared later. She also claimed that one ghost would wake her daughter, Cynthia, each morning by shaking her bed. She claimed that when spring break arrived, Cynthia proclaimed loudly that she did not have to wake up early and she would like to sleep in; her bed did not shake the next morning.

According to Ackley, her real estate broker, Ellis Realty, revealed the haunting to Jeffrey Stambovsky before he entered a contract to purchase the house in 1989 or 1990, because after Stambovsky signed the contract and made a $32,500 downpayment on the agreed price of $650,000, Ackley would not sign her end of the contract until after the haunting was disclosed to the buyers. The broker telephoned Stambovsky and advised him of Ackley's claim, and he laughed and said, "we'll have to call in the Ghostbusters", in reference to a popular movie at the time. The broker then informed Ackley that Stambovsky was advised, so she signed her end of the contract of sale, and the house was heading to closing. Both the broker and the seller told the court this sequence of events, while Stambovsky claimed he was never advised of the haunting. Stambovsky was from New York City and was not aware of the folklore of Nyack, including the widely known haunting story.

About one week after the contracts of sale were fully signed, Stambovsky requested an in-person meeting at the property with the seller to discuss the "ghosts". After Ackley told the Stambovskys the haunting story, Stambovsky filed an action requesting rescission of the contract of sale and for damages for fraudulent misrepresentation by Ackley and Ellis Realty. Stambovsky did not attend the closing, which caused him to forfeit the downpayment (although he was then not obligated to buy the house). A New York Supreme Court (trial court) dismissed the action, and Stambovsky appealed.

== The case on appeal ==
=== Majority opinion ===
Near the beginning of the majority opinion (three out of five justices) appears its most well-known conclusion: "having reported [the ghosts'] presence in both a national publication... and the local press... defendant is estopped to deny their existence and, as a matter of law, the house is haunted." The court noted that regardless of whether the house was truly haunted or not, the fact that the house had been widely reported as being haunted greatly affected its value.

Notwithstanding these conclusions, the court affirmed the dismissal of the fraudulent misrepresentation action and stated that the realtor was under no duty to disclose the haunting to potential buyers. Thus, no damages were available to Stambovsky, because New York, at the time, adhered to property law doctrine of caveat emptor.

The appellate court reversed the trial court's decision regarding the rescission action, however, as it went on to note that "haunting" was not a condition that a buyer or potential buyer of real property can and should be able to ascertain upon reasonable inspection of the property. According to the court, though the doctrine of caveat emptor would normally operate to bar a rescission action, causing seller to have no duty to disclose information about the property to be sold (but also preventing the seller from affirmatively misrepresenting the condition of the property), the doctrine, in a merged law and equity system, can be modified to do justice to the parties. In this case, "the most meticulous inspection and the search would not reveal the presence of poltergeists at the premises or unearth the property's ghoulish reputation in the community;" thus equity would allow Stambovsky the remedy of contract rescission against the seller, Ackley. The court held:

Where, as here, the seller not only takes unfair advantage of the buyer's ignorance but has created and perpetuated a condition about which he is unlikely to even inquire, enforcement of the contract (in whole or in part) is offensive to the court's sense of equity. Application of the remedy of rescission, within the bounds of the narrow exception to the doctrine of caveat emptor set forth herein, is entirely appropriate to relieve the unwitting purchaser from the consequences of a most unnatural bargain.

The opinion makes reference to a number of popular books and films featuring ghosts, including Shakespeare's Hamlet and the 1984 movie Ghostbusters and uses supernatural idioms throughout (e.g., "plaintiff hasn't a ghost of a chance", "I am moved by the spirit of equity", and "the notion [...] is a hobgoblin which should be exorcised from the body of legal precedent").

=== Dissenting opinion ===
The dissenting opinion argued that the doctrine of caveat emptor should be strictly applied and would affirm the trial court's dismissal of all of the actions. Displeased by the majority's basis for its holding, the dissent said, "Finally, if the doctrine of caveat emptor is to be discarded, it should be for a reason more substantive than a poltergeist. The existence of a poltergeist is no more binding upon the defendants than it is upon this court."

== Epilogue ==
The case generated considerable publicity, and area real estate agents had between 25 and 50 potential buyers calling within a week of the court's decision. Among the prospective buyers to the house at 1 LaVeta Place on the Hudson River was Kreskin. Kreskin was a renowned mentalist interested in purchasing a haunted home in which to curate his collection of paranormal paraphernalia. Ackley sold the house to another buyer and moved to Florida in 1991. Helen Ackley died in 2003, and her son-in-law "lays odds" that her spirit has taken up residence back at 1 Ackley Place. There have not been public reports of hauntings in recent years. Owners of the home in subsequent years include the singer-songwriter Ingrid Michaelson and the musician Matisyahu and filmmaker Adam Brooks. The home went up for sale in 2020 for $1.9 million and last sold in 2021 for $1,795,000.

== Ghost stories ==
The house had been vacant and was in disrepair when the Ackleys moved into the waterfront home in the 1960s. Local children purportedly warned them that the house was haunted, though no prior paranormal incidents appear to have been published. Helen Ackley claimed there were at least three ghosts in the residence. She described two as a married couple who had lived in the 18th century and the other as a Navy Lieutenant in the American Revolution. In 1993, she was contacted by paranormal researcher Bill Merrill and medium Glenn Johnson, who claimed to have already made contact with two of the spirits at 1 LaVeta Place. The pair met with Helen and disclosed that the couple were likely the poltergeists of Sir George and Lady Margaret, who lived in the region in the 18th century.

While the couple's identity has never been historically verified, what was claimed about this ghostly couple by Merrill and Johnson is that :

- The lived in the area.
- They were British
- They died in the 1750s

In 1995, Merrill and Johnson published a book about their findings entitled Sir George, The Ghost of Nyack (Deer Publishing, Beaverton, Oregon).

- Helen claimed to have seen Sir George:

sitting in midair, watching me paint the ceiling in the living room, rocking back and forth... I was on an 8-foot stepladder. I asked if he approved of what we were doing to the house, if the colors were to his liking. He smiled and he nodded his head.

- Helen's daughter, Cynthia, when she was a child, reportedly would be woken most mornings by one of the spirits shaking her bed. When Cynthia was out of school for spring break, she announced loudly before going to bed that she did not have school in the morning and would like to sleep in. The next morning, she was not awoken by a shaking bed.
- Helen reported to neighbors that they heard phantom footsteps and slamming doors.
- Helen's grandchildren allegedly received trinkets, such as rings, from the ghosts. These trinkets would later vanish.
- Helen's daughter-in-law received disappearing coins in the same manner, and Cynthia as an adult, claimed to receive silver sugar tongs.
- Helen claimed that her son came "eyeball-to-eyeball" with the figure of the Revolutionary Navy Lieutenant.
- Mark Kavanagh lived in the home briefly while engaged to Cynthia; he purported hearing conversation from a vacant room.
- Later Kavanagh recounted another experience:

Cyn had already fallen asleep and I was drifting. Then I heard the bedroom door creak, and the floor boards squeak. My back was to the edge of the bed. Suddenly the edge of the bed by my mid-section depressed down, and I felt something lean against me. I went literally stone stiff! I was speechless and could hardly move. I was able to twist my neck around enough to see a womanly figure in a soft dress through the moonlight from the bay windows. I felt like she was looking straight at me. After about minute, the presence got up and walked back out of the room. I finally relaxed enough to shake my wife out of sound sleep acting like a toddler who just had a nightmare.

All but Kavanagh's accounts were written by Helen and submitted to Reader's Digest magazine and published in its May 1977 issue.

Despite these somewhat unnerving tales, the Ackleys said they had a peaceful coexistence with the poltergeists, and the only account of any terrorizing events is Kavanagh's tale reproduced above. Kavanagh later reflected on the incidents that he experienced and came to the conclusion that the ghosts were evaluating him to make sure he was a good suitor for Cynthia.

Since the Ackleys moved from the home in the beginning of the 1990s, there have not been any more accounts of paranormal activity reported by any of the subsequent owners, of which there have been three. However, Merrill and Johnson reported that Sir George and Lady Margaret expressed that the spirits were not as fond of the new owners and were thinking of moving on. It is also reported that after the judgment against Helen in the lawsuit, she claimed that she was moving and taking the ghosts with her.

== The house - history and today ==
The imposing Victorian waterfront home was built in 1890 with 5 bedrooms, 3 ½ baths, and approximately 4,628 square feet. George and Helen Ackley purchased the home in the early 1960s and shared the home with their four children, Cynthia, George, Cara, and William. George died at an area hospital after heart surgery in 1978 at the age of 53, less than one year after the first accounts of paranormal activity appeared in Reader's Digest. Though his death was not in the home, there was a death in the home later when a relatively young and otherwise healthy dinner guest died of a brain aneurysm. By 1990, the residents included Helen's grandchildren, daughter-in-law and future son-in-law, Mark Kavanagh. The home sold on Jan 8, 2016, for more than $600,000 above comparable homes in Nyack according to Trulia, fetching $1,770,000.

The exterior of the home was red for some time, though it has now been painted light blue.

== See also ==
- Stigmatized property
- Duty of disclosure
