= Fielding Graduate University =

Private research university in Santa Barbara, California, United States

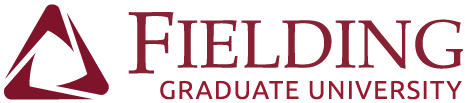
- Former names: Fielding Graduate Institute; The Fielding Institute
- Motto: "Change the world. Start with yours."
- Type: Private graduate-level university
- Established: 1974; 52 years ago
- Accreditation: WSCUC
- Endowment: $6.9 million (2020)
- Chairman: Gary Wagenheim
- President: John L. Bennett
- Provost: Allison Davis-White Eyes (interim)
- Faculty: 157
- Students: 1,000 (approx.)
- Location: Santa Barbara, California, United States
- Website: www.fielding.edu

Fielding Graduate University (previously Fielding Graduate Institute and The Fielding Institute) is a private university in Santa Barbara, California, United States. It offers postgraduate and doctoral studies mainly in psychology, education, and organizational studies, primarily through distance education programs.

Fielding Graduate University was founded in 1974 by Frederic M. Hudson, Hallock Hoffman, and Renata Tesch.

== Academics ==
The university offers graduate-level degrees (certificate, master's, and doctoral programs) in clinical psychology, media psychology, educational leadership, organizational leadership, and human development.

As of 2019, its School of Leadership offers a Ed.D. and accelerated Ph.D. degrees that can be earned in as little as three years, and its School of Psychology offers a Ph.D. in Clinical Psychology that can be earned in five or six years. The average (mean) time to complete a Ph.D. program at Fielding is 7.5 years.

The university is accredited by the WASC Senior College and University Commission (WSCUC). The Clinical Psychology Ph.D. program is accredited by the American Psychological Association (APA Commission on Accreditation).

== Partnerships ==
Fielding offers a doctorate in Creative Leadership through the University of the Virgin Islands (UVI), is developing a doctoral program in urban leadership and entrepreneurship with the University of the District of Columbia and Tulane University's Payson Center for Global Development, and established the Center for the Advancement of STEM Leadership (CASL) with UVI, North Carolina A&T, and the Association of American Colleges & Universities. The latter earned a $9 million National Science Foundation grant in 2018. Additionally, Fielding has three other centers, in addition to CASL: the Institute for Social Innovation (ISI); the Marie Fielder Center for Democracy, Leadership, and Education; and the Alonso Centers for Psychodynamic Studies.

Fielding University Press publishes several publications per year on subjects including clinical psychology, neurology, leadership studies, phenomenology, philosophy, human development, and art history. Fielding faculty, students, and alumni have contributed to several publications.

In 2015 the university was granted special consultative status to the United Nations Economic and Social Council (ECOSOC).

== Notable alumni ==
- Evelyn Torton Beck – Writer and feminist
- Randall Bell – Real estate economist and author
- Tara Brach – Psychologist and meditation expert
- Dave Caplan – Producer and television writer
- Salud Carbajal – United States Representative from California's 24th congressional district
- Marshall Colt – Television actor, psychologist
- Anita Perez Ferguson – Speaker, author, international consultant
- K. Drorit "Dee" Gaines – Neuropsychologist and radio host
- Steven Hassan – Founder of the Freedom of Mind Resource Center, author, speaker, de-programming expert
- Devon Jersild – Psychologist and author
- Janja Lalich – Sociologist studying cults
- Gina Loudon – Republican activist
- Lyle Nelson – Four Time Olympian in the Biathlon, 13-time United States or North American Champion
- Marilyn Price-Mitchell – Psychologist and columnist
- Cara Santa Maria - Psychologist and science communicator

== Notable faculty ==
- Don Trent Jacobs – Education, leadership, and psychology scholar
- Tiffany Field – Psychologist
- Ruthellen Josselson – Clinical psychologist
- Malcolm Knowles – Adult education scholar
- Jeremy J. Shapiro – Psychologist and social theorist
