= Marilyn Price-Mitchell =

American psychologist

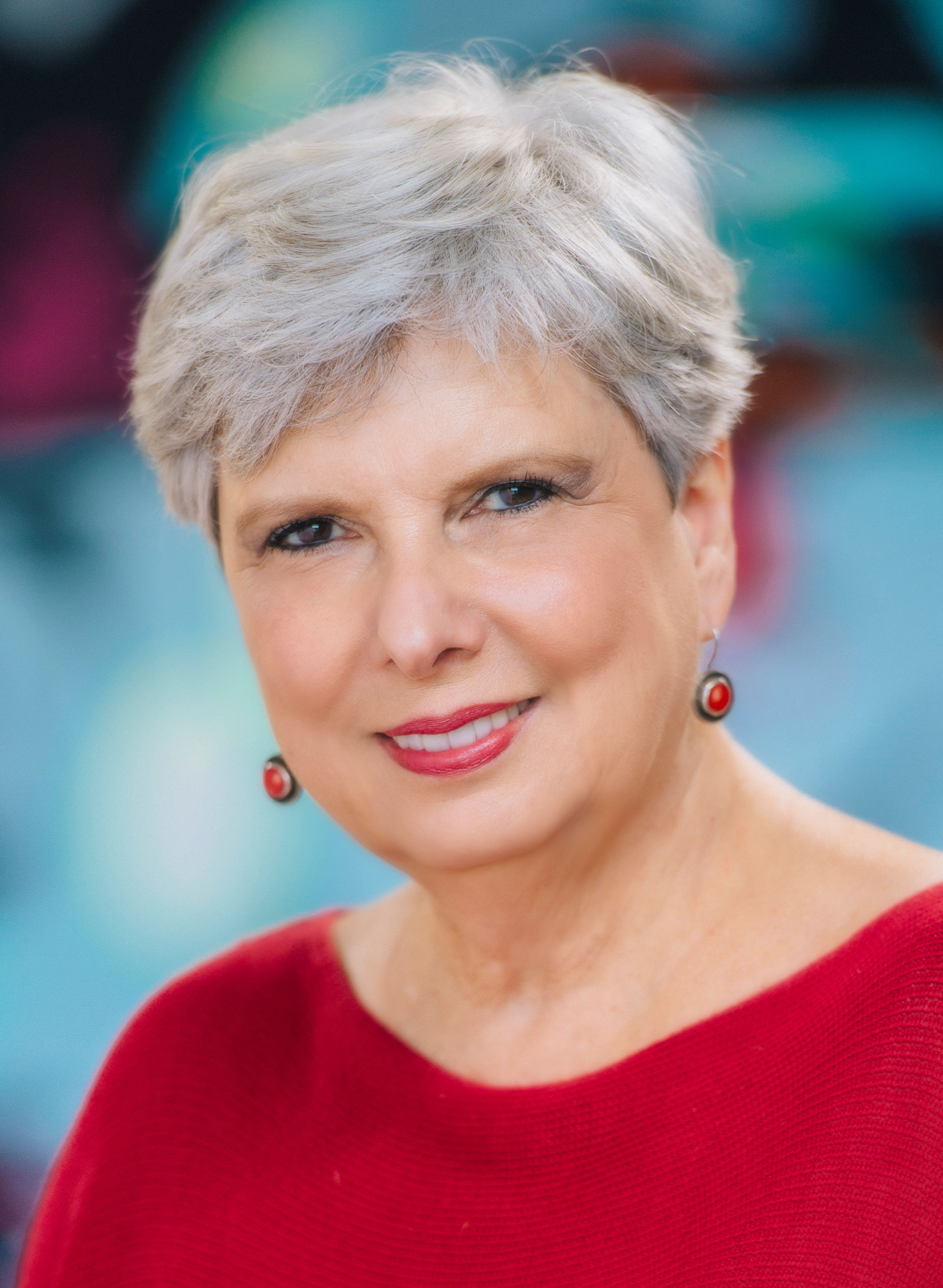
- Psychologist, Author, Youth Development Expert
- Education: Ph.D. in Human Development
- Alma mater: Fielding Graduate University
- Occupation: Psychologist
- Known for: Youth development

Marilyn Price-Mitchell (born March 1, 1949) is an American psychologist, author, columnist, speaker, and youth development expert. She is the co-founder and serves on the Advisory Board of the Washington State Family & Community Engagement Trust (formerly known as the National ParentNet Association) and has a regular column at Psychology Today. She has also served as a fellow at the Fielding Graduate University Institute for Social Innovation.

== Background and education ==
Price-Mitchell grew up in Harper Woods, Michigan, the daughter of Herman William Dennis and Dorothy Virginia Latimer. She graduated (Marilyn Dennis) from Harper Woods High School in 1967 and has an undergraduate degree from the University of Michigan. Price-Mitchell obtained her Ph.D. in Human Development through Fielding Graduate University in 2010 where she also received a master's degree in Human and Organizational Systems.

== Career ==
Price-Mitchell's research is in the field of positive youth development. Her 2010 research study, Civic Learning at the Edge: Transformative Stories of Highly Engaged Youth, explored how young people experienced and met the challenges of civic engagement during the formative adolescent and young adult years. It examined how these youth developed initiative for public service, learned from experiences and adult relationships, and constructed meaning that propelled them to take action in the world. Following the completion of her study, Price-Mitchell received the Elizabeth Douvan Post-Doctoral Fellowship, an annual donor-funded scholarship, to continue her research with civically engaged youth. Price-Mitchell's research was used to support the development of GenerationOn, the youth division of Points of Light. It also provided the foundation for Price-Mitchell's book, Tomorrow’s Change Makers: Reclaiming the Power of Citizenship for a New Generation (Eagle Harbor Publishing, 2015) where she introduced a new framework to understand positive youth development called "The Compass Advantage". The framework is being used by schools and communities worldwide to foster core abilities in youth.

Price-Mitchell's linking of boundary dynamics and parental engagement was cited in length in the book The Crucial Voice of the People, Past and Present: Education's Missing Ingredient, by Victoria M. Young. Her work in positive youth development and positive education has been cited in numerous other books including The Practice of Teaching by Allan Ornstein, Beyond Smart by Linda Morgan, Masculinities in Contemporary American Culture: An Intersectional Approach by Thomas Keith, and Narrowing the Achievement Gap: Parental Engagement with Children’s Learning by Janet Goodall.

Price-Mitchell is the founder of Roots of Action, a website that offers insights and research on child and adolescent development, education, and positive psychology. She authors the column The Moment of Youth for Psychology Today and is a blogger for Edutopia, a web resource for educators provided by the George Lucas Educational Foundation. Her writing has been featured in The Henry Ford Magazine and she has been interviewed on the topic of youth development by podcasters.

She has been quoted or covered in various media outlets including NBC News, Today, Parents.com, Modern Mom, Arkansas Matters, and Deseret News. Numerous scholarly journal articles and books have cited her works.
