= K. Drorit "Dee" Gaines =

American psychologist

- Education: University of California, Los Angeles, Fielding Graduate University
- Known for: Treatments for combat-related PTSD, traumatic brain injury, public education

K. Drorit "Dee" Gaines is a neuropsychologist specializing in diagnostic evaluations, brain injury, trauma, and public education. She is most known for her work with United States veterans, and serves as an authority on the physical brain's effects on behavior and cognitive functioning.

== Education ==
Gaines earned her bachelor's degree in Business Economics and Accounting from the University of California, Los Angeles, and her doctorate in Clinical Psychology and Neuropsychology from Fielding Graduate University. She received additional post-doctoral training at the UCLA Longevity Center, where she developed and led a treatment program incorporating artistic expression, dance, and meditation to assist patients with dementia.

== Career ==
As a lead researcher for the United States Department of Veterans Affairs, Gaines studies brain functioning in combat veterans who've suffered post traumatic stress disorder (PTSD) and traumatic brain injuries. She currently resides on the board of the National Academy of Neuropsychology Foundation, and is Chair of the Public Education Committee for the Los Angeles Psychological Association (LACPA).

== The Dr. Dee Show (Radio) ==
Gaines hosts and produces The Dr. Dee Show, the world's first neuropsychology radio program focused on public education. The show broadcasts weekly on KABC-AM in the greater Los Angeles area, and features guest experts in multiple medical and psychological fields. The Dr. Dee Show offers a hybrid of scientific research and holistic matters such as spirituality, healthy lifestyles, and general wellbeing. Previous show topics include brain injury, mental illness, bullying, self-worth, post traumatic stress disorder, human trafficking, sickle cell anemia, autism, dementia, and addiction.

== Selected bibliography ==
- Gaines, K. D., Soper, H. (2016). Neuropsychological Assessment of Executive Functions Following Pediatric Traumatic Brain Injury. Applied Neuropsychology Child, published online September 27, 2016 https://dx.doi.org/10.1080/21622965.2016.1229406
- Gaines, K. D., Soper, H., & Berenji, G. (2014). Executive Functioning of Combat Mild Traumatic Brain Injury. Applied Neuropsychology Adult, 1–10.
- Gaines, K. D., Soper, H., & Berenji, G. R. (2014). Executive functioning of combat veterans diagnosed with mild traumatic brain injury. International Neuropsychology Society conference. Jerusalem, Israel, July 9, 2014.
- Gaines, K. D., Berenji, G. R., Alas, R. S., Sayre, J., & Okonek, A. (2014). Comparison of effort measures, cognitive complaints, and self-reported neuropsychiatric symptoms in blast-induced mild TBI. International Neuropsychology Society conference. Jerusalem, Israel, July 10, 2014.
- Gaines, K. D., Isaacs, C., Horton, F. M., Doig, H. M., & Soper, H. V. (2010). Christensen and Rey Tangled-8 Tests for Executive Assessment. Applied Neuropsychology, 17, 211.
- Gaines, K. D., Bennett, T. L., Doig, H. M., Loo, M. M., & Soper, H. V. (2011). Effects of Aging on Memory. Applied Neuropsychology, 18.
