= HemoSpat =

Bloodstain pattern analysis software

- HemoSpat software (version 1.12) screenshot
- Developer: FORident Software
- Initial release: April 20, 2006; 20 years ago
- Stable release: v1.12.2 / June 20, 2020; 5 years ago
- Written in: C++ and Qt
- Operating system: macOS 10.13, macOS 10.14, Windows 8, Windows 8.1, Windows 10
- Available in: English
- Type: Crime Scene Reconstruction Software
- License: Proprietary
- Website: hemospat.com

HemoSpat is bloodstain pattern analysis software created by FORident Software in 2006. Using photos from a bloodshed incident at a crime scene, a bloodstain pattern analyst can use HemoSpat to calculate the area-of-origin of impact patterns. This information may be useful for determining position and posture of suspects and victims, sequencing of events, corroborating or refuting testimony, and for crime scene reconstruction.

The results of the analyses may be viewed in 2D within the software as top-down, side, and front views, or exported to several 3D formats for integration with point cloud or modelling software. The formats which HemoSpat exports include:

- AUTOCAD DXF
- COLLADA
- PLY
- VRML
- Wavefront OBJ

HemoSpat is capable of calculating impact pattern origins with only part of the pattern available, as well as impacts on non-orthogonal surfaces. HemoSpat has also been used in research into what kind of information may be captured from cast-off patterns, methods of scene documentation, and in improving area-of-origin calculations.
