= Stockwell ghost =

Poltergeist hoax in England

The Stockwell ghost, also known as the Stockwell poltergeist, was an alleged case of poltergeist disturbance in Stockwell, London, England, that occurred in 1772. It was later exposed as a hoax.

On 6 January 1772 at the house of Mrs Golding, various cups, saucers and stone plates were reported to have fallen from a shelf to the ground and food was thrown across the room. Violent noises were also heard around the house. Golding decided to take refuge with her neighbour but the disturbances continued. It was noted that the disturbances only took place when her servant Ann Robinson was present. She was dismissed and the disturbances ceased. Despite the suspicious circumstances surrounding Robinson, the case was considered for many years by the public to be the result of poltergeist activity or witchcraft.

William Hone in his The Every Day Book (1825) revealed that Ann Robinson later admitted she had faked the phenomena. She had attached horsehairs and wires to move the crockery, thrown the other objects and made the noises herself. The Stockwell ghost was sensationalized by Catherine Crowe in The Night-Side of Nature (1848) as a genuine poltergeist incident. She failed to cite the confession of fraud that was documented by Hone.
