= Randall Bell =

American specialist real estate economist

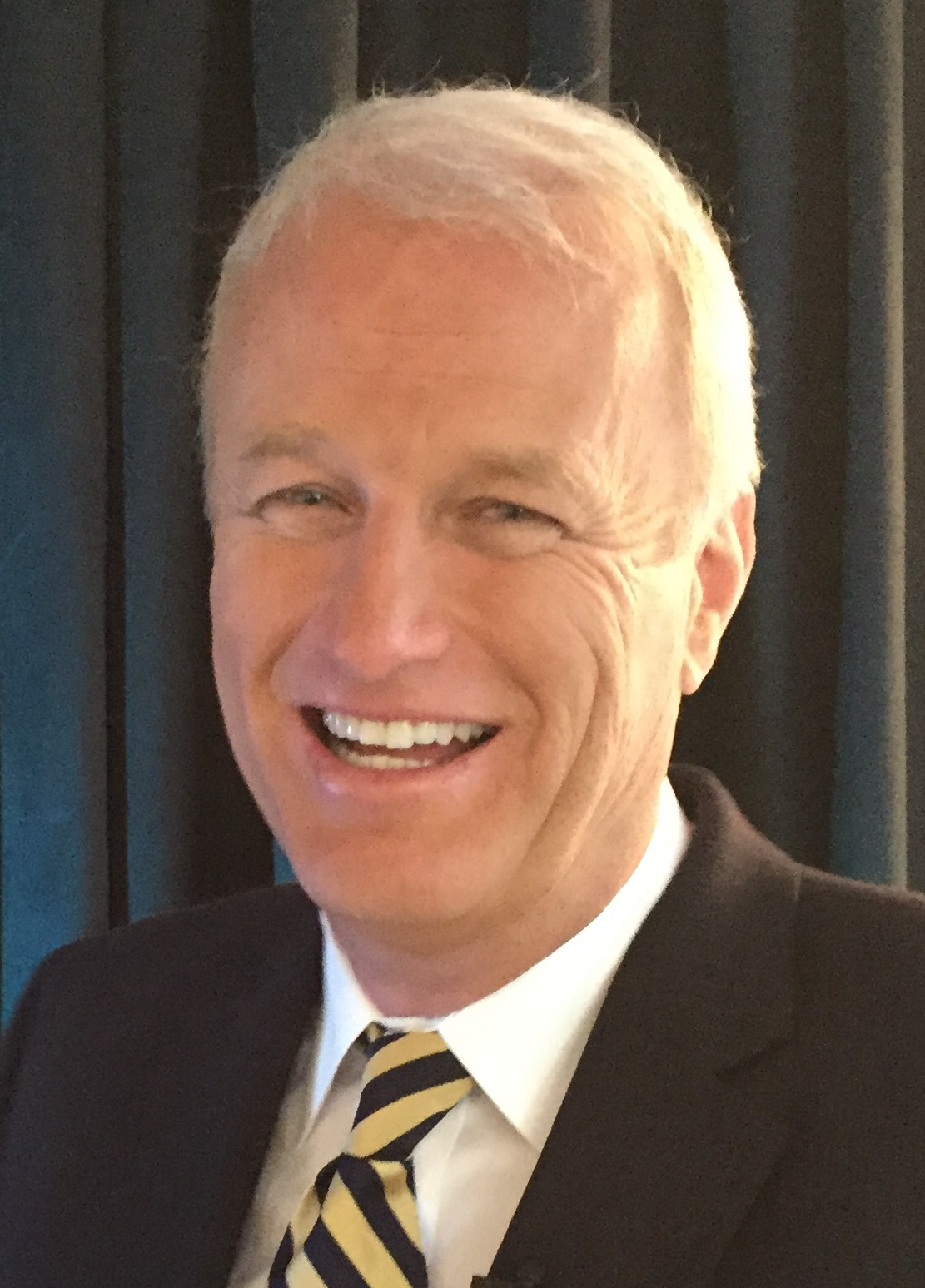
- Born: Cleveland, Ohio
- Occupation: Real estate damage economist
- Known for: "The Master of Disaster"
- Children: 4

Academic background
- Education: UCLA, Fielding Graduate University
- Thesis: Posttraumatic Behaviors: The Socioeconomic Reasoning of Homeowners Who Voluntarily Remained in the Aftermath of Hurricane Katrina (2013)
- Doctoral advisor: Miguel Guilarte, PhD

Academic work
- Discipline: Socioeconomics
- Website: www.landmarkresearch.com

Randall Bell (born 1959) is a socio-economist, real estate economist and appraiser, expert witness, and author based in Los Angeles, California known for dealing with stigmatized property. Bell is an expert on real estate damages, who authored a highly referenced textbook on the subject, and was called "Dr. Disaster" by The Wall Street Journal. Bell's notable cases include: Nicole Brown Simpson's Los Angeles condominium, the mansion where 39 Heaven's Gate members died of suicide, the JonBenét Ramsey house in Colorado, the World Trade Center site, and properties damaged in the Rodney King riots and by Hurricane Katrina.

== Early life and education ==
Bell grew up in Fullerton, California as the son of an engineer and homemaker, and attended Troy High School. He has an MBA from UCLA. He received his doctoral degree from Fielding Graduate University in Santa Barbara, California, with a dissertation on the socioeconomic reasoning of Hurricane Katrina survivors.

== Career ==
Bell began working on appraisals of environmental and asbestos damage in the 1980s. He has also assessed Chinese drywall and sink holes. In 1992, Bell assessed the damages of the Rodney King riots in Los Angeles. After the riots, he decided to focus only on damaged properties. Also in 1992, Bell created the Bell Chart, a rating system that categorizes the 10 types of detrimental conditions and their corresponding economic damages of properties. The system ranks properties from class 1 (no detrimental effects) to class 10 (an incurable condition). In 1994, he began assessing stigmatized properties such as the damages of the Northridge earthquake and wildfires in Malibu, California. In 1997, he became the national director of the Real Estate Damages practice of Price Waterhouse. He left the firm in 1999, and co-founded Bell Anderson & Sanders with two partners. He is presently CEO of Landmark Research Group.

Bell works with properties that have been affected by crime, environmental contamination, construction defects, reported hauntings, and natural disasters. He has consulted on Nicole Brown Simpson's condominium; the Beverly Hills estate where Charles Manson's followers murdered Sharon Tate and four other people in 1969; the Rancho Santa Fe mansions where the bodies of 39 Heaven's Gate cult members were found, the house in Boulder, Colorado, where JonBenét Ramsey was killed; the home of Sandy Hook shooter Adam Lanza; and the house of Las Vegas shooter Stephen Paddock. He has also consulted on Hurricane Katrina; the Bikini Atoll in the Marshall Islands; the September 11 attacks at the World Trade Center; and the United Airlines Flight 93 crash site in Shanksville. Bell has traveled to Chernobyl, Hiroshima; to the World Trade Center site; and to Egypt, Jordan, Israel and West Bank to find comparisons in properties damaged by terrorist attacks. He has also traveled to Antarctica to interview scientists about climate change and how it affects costs, such as insurance for home owners. The Appraisal Institute published Bell's book Real Estate Damages: Applied Economics and Detrimental Conditions in 2008. In 2011, Bell returned from Guam, where he consulted with landowners whose property included the cave where Shoichi Yokoi, a Japanese army sergeant, hid for 28 years, unaware that World War II had ended. The landowners opened a theme park on the property.

In recent years, Bell has begun writing self-help books, inspired by his interactions with disaster victims and his personal experiences with overcoming trauma and obstacles.

Bell hosted the 2020 docuseries, Distressed Real Estate, produced by Topic Studios.

== Bibliography ==
- Real Estate Damages: An Analysis of Detrimental Conditions (1999) (ISBN 0922154554)
- Property Owners Manual (2004) (ISBN 0974452114)
- Owners Manual (2004)
- Business Owners Manual (2004) (ISBN 0974452130)
- Home Owners Manual (2004) (ISBN 0974452122)
- Disasters: Wasted Lives, Valuable Lessons (2005) (ISBN 9781930819436)
- Strategy 360: 10 Steps for Creating a Complete Game Plan for Business & Life (2008) (ISBN 1933969164)
- Rich Habits Rich Life (2016) (ISBN 9781933969237)
- Me We Do Be: The Four Cornerstones of Success (2017) (ISBN 0996793119)
- Leo Fender: The Quiet Giant Heart Around the World (2017) (ISBN 0996793143)
- Post-Traumatic Thriving (2021) (ISBN 0996793178)

== Personal life ==
Randall Bell lives in Laguna Beach, California with his wife and has four children. Bell volunteers at the Laguna Beach homeless and rehabilitation center, Friendship Shelter.
