= Frederic M. Hudson =

Frederic M. Hudson (March 6, 1934 – February 9, 2015) was an American philosopher, educator, writer, and thought leader in the area of adult development, adult learning and leadership coaching. He was the founding President of the Fielding Graduate University and the Hudson Institute of Coaching.

Hudson was both a Rockefeller and Danforth fellow, and received a doctorate from Columbia University, New York. His early academic career as a professor included stints at Colby College in Maine and Lone Mountain College in San Francisco. In 1973 he was founding president of the Fielding Institute. He left in 1986 to found The Hudson Institute of Coaching, which trains professionals in leadership and executive coaching.

Hudson authored many books on the subjects of transition and change as well as adult development including: The Adult Years, The Handbook of Coaching, and LifeLaunch: A Passionate Guide to the Rest of Your Life.

Hudson died on February 9, 2015, at the age of 80.
