= Poltergeist =

Ghost that causes physical disturbance

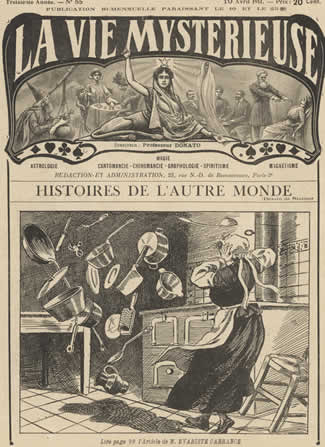
Artist conception of poltergeist activity claimed by Thérèse Selles, a 14-year-old domestic servant of the Todescini family at Cheragas, Algeria. From the French magazine La Vie Mystérieuse in 1911.

In German folklore and ghostlore, a poltergeist (/ˈpoʊl.tər.ˌɡaɪst/ or /ˈpɒl.tər.ˌɡaɪst/; German: [ˈpɔltɐɡaɪ̯st]; 'rumbling ghost' or 'noisy spirit') is a type of ghost or spirit that is responsible for physical disturbances, such as loud noises and objects being moved or destroyed. Most claims or fictional descriptions of poltergeists show them as being capable of pinching, biting, hitting, and tripping people. They are also depicted as capable of the movement or levitation of objects such as furniture and cutlery, or noises such as knocking on doors. Foul smells are also associated with poltergeist occurrences, as well as spontaneous fires and different electrical issues such as flickering lights.

These manifestations have been recorded in many cultures and countries, including Brazil, Australia, the United States, Japan and most European nations. The first recorded cases date back to the 1st century.

Skeptics explain poltergeists as juvenile tricksters fooling credulous adults.

== Etymology ==
The word poltergeist comes from the German language words poltern 'to make sound, to rumble' and Geist 'ghost, spirit' and the term itself translates as 'noisy ghost', 'rumble-ghost' or a 'loud spirit'.

== Suggested explanations ==
=== Hoax ===
Many claims have been made that poltergeist activity explains strange events (including those by modern self-styled ghost hunters), however, their evidence has so far not stood up to scrutiny. Many claimed poltergeist events have been proven upon investigation to be hoaxes.

Psychical researcher Frank Podmore proposed the 'naughty little girl' theory for poltergeist cases (many of which have seemed to centre on an adolescent, usually a girl). He found that the centre of the disturbance was often a child who was throwing objects around to fool or scare people for attention. Skeptical investigator Joe Nickell says that claimed poltergeist incidents typically originate from "an individual who is motivated to cause mischief". According to Nickell:

In the typical poltergeist outbreak, small objects are hurled through the air by unseen forces, furniture is overturned, or other disturbances occur—usually just what could be accomplished by a juvenile trickster determined to plague credulous adults.

Nickell writes that reports are often exaggerated by credulous witnesses.

Time and time again in other "poltergeist" outbreaks, witnesses have reported an object leaping from its resting place supposedly on its own, when it is likely that the perpetrator had secretly obtained the object sometime earlier and waited for an opportunity to fling it, even from outside the room—thus supposedly proving he or she was innocent.

Unsubstantiated claims:

- Stockwell ghost (1772) – since 1825
- Ballechin House (1876)
- The Enfield poltergeist claim (1977) – John Beloff, a former president of the Society for Psychical Research and Anita Gregory concluded that the claimants were playing tricks on the investigators.
- Columbus poltergeist case (1984)

=== Psychological ===
A claim of activity at Caledonia Mills (1899–1922) was investigated by Walter Franklin Prince, research officer for the American Society for Psychical Research in 1922. Prince concluded that the mysterious fires and alleged poltergeist phenomena were because of a psychological state of dissociation.

Nandor Fodor investigated the Thornton Heath poltergeist claim (1938). His conclusion of the case was a psychoanalytical explanation and in a subsequent publication: "The poltergeist is not a ghost. It is a bundle of projected repressions".

According to research in anomalistic psychology, claims of poltergeist activity can be explained by psychological factors such as illusion, memory lapses, and wishful thinking. A study (by Lange and Houran, 1998) wrote that poltergeist experiences are delusions "resulting from the affective and cognitive dynamics of percipients' interpretation of ambiguous stimuli". Psychologist Donovan Rawcliffe has written that almost all poltergeist cases that have been investigated turned out to be based on trickery, whilst the rest are attributable to psychological factors such as hallucinations.

Psychoanalyst Carl Gustav Jung was interested in the concept of poltergeists and the occult in general. Jung believed that a female cousin's trance states were responsible for a dining table splitting in two and his later discovery of a broken bread knife.

Jung also believed that when a bookcase gave an explosive cracking sound during a meeting with Sigmund Freud in 1909, he correctly predicted there would be a second sound, speculating that such phenomena were caused by the 'exteriorization' of his subconscious mind. Freud disagreed, and concluded there was some natural cause. Freud's biographers maintain the sounds were likely caused by the wood of the bookcase contracting as it dried out.

=== Unverified natural phenomena ===
Attempts have also been made to scientifically explain poltergeist disturbances that have not been traced to fraud or psychological factors. Skeptic and magician Milbourne Christopher found that some cases of poltergeist activity can be attributed to unusual air currents, such as a 1957 case on Cape Cod where downdrafts from an uncovered chimney became strong enough to blow a mirror off a wall, overturn chairs and knock things off shelves.

In the 1950s, Guy William Lambert proposed that reported poltergeist phenomena could be explained by the movement of underground water causing stress on houses. He suggested that water turbulence could cause strange sounds or structural movement of the property, possibly causing the house to vibrate and move objects. Later researchers, such as Alan Gauld and Tony Cornell, tested Lambert's hypothesis by placing specific objects in different rooms and subjecting the house to strong mechanical vibrations. They discovered that although the structure of the building had been damaged, only a few of the objects moved a very short distance. The skeptic Trevor H. Hall criticized the hypothesis claiming if it were true "the building would almost certainly fall into ruins." According to Richard Wiseman the hypothesis has not held up to scrutiny.

Michael Persinger has theorized that seismic activity could cause poltergeist phenomena. However, Persinger's claims regarding the effects of environmental geomagnetic activity on paranormal experiences have not been independently replicated and, like his findings regarding the God helmet, may simply be explained by the suggestibility of participants.

David Turner, a retired physical chemist, suggested that ball lightning might cause the "spooky movement of objects blamed on poltergeists."

- Sampford Peverell (1810–1811) – poltergeistal noises were determined made by smugglers from behind a false wall

=== Paranormal ===
Parapsychologists Nandor Fodor and William G. Roll suggested that poltergeist activity can be explained by psychokinesis.

Historically, actual malicious spirits were blamed for apparent poltergeist-type activity, such as objects moving seemingly of their own accord. According to Allan Kardec, the founder of Spiritism, poltergeists are manifestations of disembodied spirits of low level, belonging to the sixth class of the third order. Under this explanation, they are believed to be closely associated with the elements (fire, air, water, earth). In Finland, the cases of the "Mäkkylä Ghost" in 1946, which received attention in the press at the time, and the "Devils of Martin" in Ylöjärvi in the late 19th century, for which affidavits were obtained in court, are fairly well known. Samuli Paulaharju recorded a memoir of a typical poltergeist — the case of "Salkko-Niila" — from the south of Lake Inari in his book Memoirs of Lapland (Lapin muisteluksia). The story has also been published in the collection of Mythical Stories (Myytillisiä tarinoita) edited by Lauri Simonsuuri.

== Famous cases ==
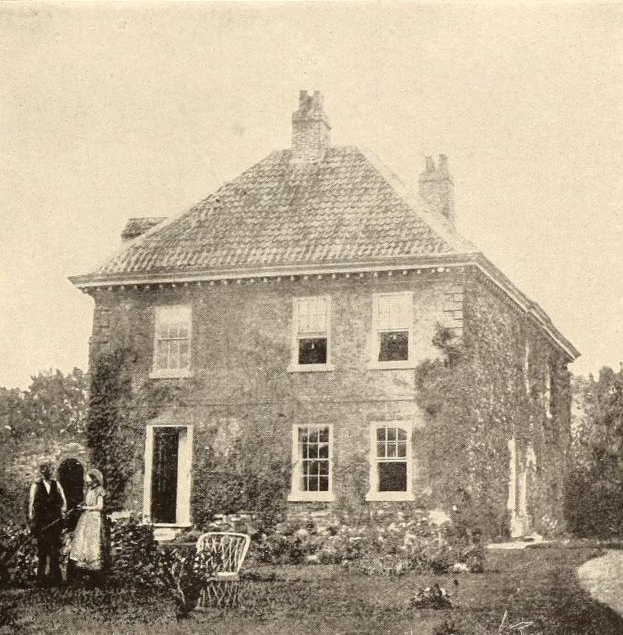
Epworth Rectory, supposed site of paranormal hauntings in the mid-1710s

- Glenluce Devil (1654–1656)
- Drummer of Tedworth (1662)
- Mackie poltergeist (1695)
- Wesley poltergeist claim at Epworth Rectory (1716–1717)
- Hinton Ampner (1764–1771)
- Bell Witch of Tennessee (1817–1872)
- John Bovee Dods (1824)
- Bealings Bells (1834)
- Angelique Cottin (ca. 1846)
- Great Amherst Mystery (1878–1879)
- Gef the Talking Mongoose (1931)
- Borley Rectory (1937)
- Seaford poltergeist (1958)
- Matthew Manning (1960s–1970s)
- The Black Monk of Pontefract (1960s–1970s)
- Rosenheim poltergeist claim (1967)
- The Stambovsky v. Ackley poltergeist (1970s–1980s)
- The Corda poltergeist at Wilsele (1973)
- The Amityville case (1975)
- Enfield poltergeist (1977–1979)
- Thornton Road poltergeist claim (1981)
- Ammons haunting case (2011)

== See also ==
- Apparitional experience
- Ghost
- Ghost hunting
- List of topics characterized as pseudoscience
- Lithobolia
- Mischievous fairies
- Parapsychology topics (list)
- Spiritism
- Stigmatized property
