= Crime reenactment =

A crime reenactment is a practice where criminal suspects are ordered, as part of the police investigation process, to describe or act out the steps of the crime of which they are accused. It is claimed to help investigators visualize the crime and verify confessions.

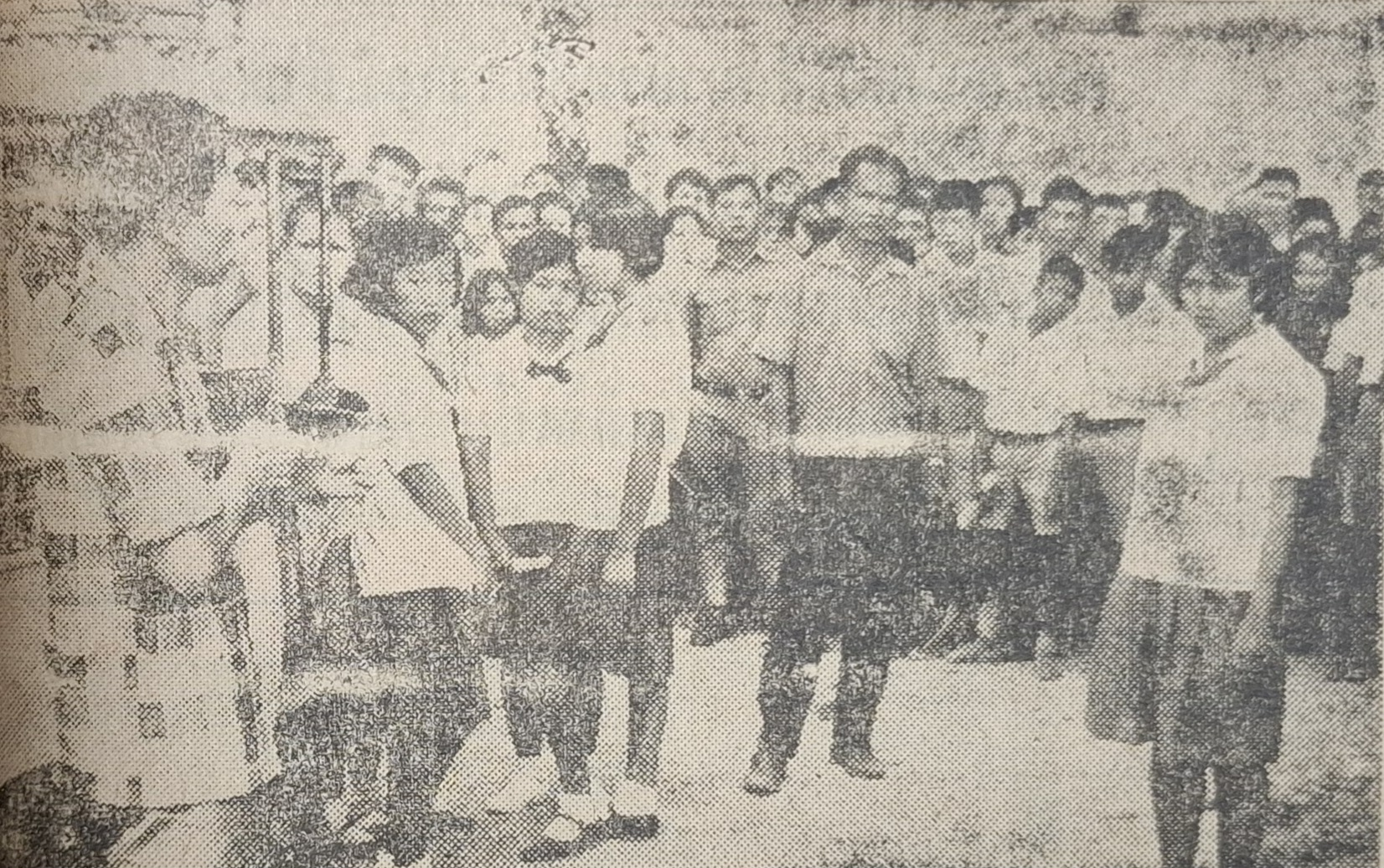
Crime reenactment of krabi school girl killing

In some countries, including South Korea and Thailand, crime reenactments are done publicly at the site of the crime, serving as a form of public humiliation. The practice has been criticized by rights groups, including Thailand's National Human Rights Commission, as violating suspects' rights and the principle of presumption of innocence.

== See also ==
- Crime reconstruction
- Perp walk
