= William G. Roll =

American psychologist (1926–2012)

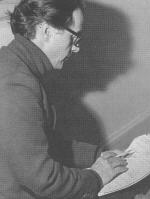
- Born: July 3, 1926; Bremen, Germany
- Died: January 9, 2012 (aged 85); Normal, Illinois
- Occupations: Parapsychologist, writer
- Relatives: William Roll (father)

Academic background
- Education: University of California, Berkeley (BA); Oxford University (M. Litt.); Lund University (PhD)

Academic work
- Discipline: Psychologist, parapsychologist
- Institutions: University of West Georgia

William G. Roll (July 3, 1926 – January 9, 2012) was an American psychologist and parapsychologist on the faculty of the Psychology Department of the University of West Georgia in Carrollton, Georgia. Roll is most notable for his belief in poltergeist activity. He coined the term "recurrent spontaneous psychokinesis" (RSPK) to explain poltergeist cases. However, RSPK was never accepted by mainstream science and skeptics have described Roll as a credulous investigator.

== Career ==
Roll was born in 1926 in Bremen, Germany, where his father, diplomat William Roll, was American Vice-consul. At the age of three, after his parents divorced, he moved to Denmark with his mother Gudrun Agerholm Roll. According to Roll, while in Denmark, he began having out-of-body experiences at night. His mother died in 1942 and in 1946 he went to America with his father, who had come to Denmark with the American Allied forces.

Roll enrolled at the University of California, Berkeley, in 1947, where he received his BA, majoring in philosophy and psychology. A year after graduating, he went on to Oxford University, where he did parapsychology research for eight years. During this period, he was president of the Oxford University Society for Psychical Research. At Oxford, he wrote his thesis which earned him his Master of Letters degree, "Theory and Experiment in Psychical Research". His thesis was later published in the United States by Arno Press.

Sometimes credited as William Roll, or informally, Bill Roll, he was a parapsychologist since the 1950s and authored or coauthored many research papers and articles, as well as four books: The Poltergeist (1972), Theory and Experiment in Psychical Research (1975), Psychic Connections (1995, with co-author Lois Duncan), and Unleashed: Of Poltergeists and Murder: The Curious Story of Tina Resch (2004, with co-author Valerie Storey). He is also notable for making several appearances in the television show Unsolved Mysteries, among them an episode discussing disturbances on the RMS Queen Mary (in this episode he was mistakenly credited as being Danish-born).

Roll was invited by J. B. Rhine to join the Parapsychology Laboratory of Duke University, where he worked from 1957 to 1964. In 1964, he became president of the Parapsychological Association. In 1958, he coined the term "recurrent spontaneous psychokinesis" (RSPK) in a research paper written with J. G. Pratt that dealt with their investigation of objects moving in a home in Seaford, Long Island, New York USA, that was centered on a 12-year-old son of an affected family.

In 1961, Roll became project director of the Psychical Research Foundation (PRF), an offshoot of J. B. Rhine's Laboratory. After Rhine's retirement from Duke, the PRF left the Duke campus, but in 1969 it returned to Duke as a sponsored program of the School of Electrical Engineering.

Roll received a PhD in psychology from Lund University in 1989 for a thesis entitled, "This World or That: An Examination of Parapsychological Findings Suggestive of the Survival of Human Personality After Death".

In the 1980s and 1990s, Roll held various positions at the University of West Georgia, including Professor of Psychology and Psychical Research, assistant professor, and instructor. In later years, Roll retired from teaching, though he taught a course in parapsychology at the University of West Georgia in 2007, and continued to write, speak at conferences, and conduct occasional investigations. He was awarded the Parapsychological Award for a Distinguished Career in Parapsychology in 1996 and the Dinsdale Memorial Award from the Society of Scientific Exploration in 2002.

Roll's most famous case was as the lead investigator on the 1984 "Columbus Poltergeist" case, in which remarkable color photos were taken by a veteran newspaper photographer for the Columbus Dispatch newspaper, Fred Shannon, which allegedly showed spontaneous telekinesis events in action occurring in the home of Columbus, Ohio, teenager Tina Resch.

Roll died at the age of 85, in a nursing home in Normal, Illinois. Prior to that, he had a long residence in the state of Georgia in the Southeastern United States with his wife. He is survived by his adult children, grandchildren, and his wife.

== Seaford poltergeist ==
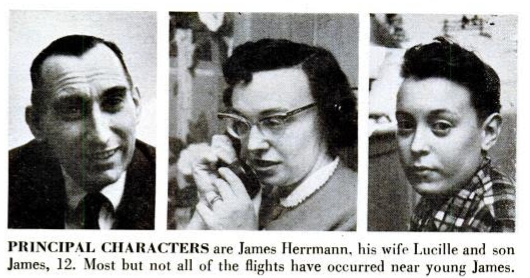
The James Hermann family of the alleged Seaford poltergeist case

In Seaford, New York, strange poltergeist events were reported by James M. Herrmann and his family in their house. In 1958, Roll investigated the case with the parapsychologist Joseph Gaither Pratt and suggested that although some of the phenomena may have been pranks from Hermann's twelve-year-old son James Jr, some of the events were the result of "recurrent spontaneous psychokinesis" (RSPK). However, RSPK has never been accepted by mainstream science and there is no evidence it exists.

The case was later re-evaluated by the skeptic Joe Nickell who concluded that all the phenomena could be explained by deliberate trickery from Hermann's son James Jr. According to Nickell, both Pratt and Roll were rather credulous and had little understanding of magic trickery. Nickell concluded that "Taken as a whole, the evidence strongly points to twelve-year-old James Hermann Jr. as having been the deliberate cause of the Seaford "poltergeist" outbreak. The motive, means, and opportunity were his, and the case was unwittingly prolonged by the credulousness of adults."

== Reception ==
Roll's theory that poltergeists are the result of psychokinetic activity has drawn criticism from magicians and skeptics. Roll is notable for endorsing Tina Resch, a central figure in a series of incidents that came to be called the Columbus poltergeist case, who he spent a week investigating. Magician and skeptical investigator Bob Couttie has written:

Roll's report has been heavily criticised. For instance, a picture fell from a bedroom wall and Roll started to replace it by hammering in a nail with a pair of pliers. As he did this, he was watching Tina out of the corner of his eye, or so he says, yet Roll is very short-sighted and it takes a brave man to hammer in a nail and attend to very poor peripheral vision at the same time. While he was doing this, Roll's tape- recorder was moved from a dresser that was immediately behind him. He turned to pick up the machine, which had come to rest between 7ft and 9ft behind him. As he did this his pliers were moved to a far wall. It is difficult to accept that Tina was sufficiently closely observed to preclude her moving the tape-recorder and pliers.

Resch was detected utilizing trickery by James Randi, but Roll had endorsed her phenomena as genuine. Henry Gordon has stated that parapsychologists such as Roll and Nandor Fodor took a speculative approach to the poltergeist subject, ignoring the rational explanation of deception in favor of a belief in the paranormal.

== Publications ==
- The Poltergeist (1972, 2004 edition, Paraview Special Editions) ISBN 1-931044-69-4
- Theory and Experiment in Psychical Research (1975)
- Psychic Connections (1995) [with Lois Duncan]
- Unleashed: Of Poltergeists and Murder: The Curious Story of Tina Resch (2004, Pocket Books)
