= William Roll (diplomat) =

American diplomat

William George Roll (July 4, 1892 – 1967) was an American diplomat who was instrumental in organizing NATO for Northern Europe. Roll was the U.S. Vice Consul in Copenhagen in 1921 and in Bremen from 1926 to 1929.

== Early life ==
William George Roll was born on July 4, 1892, in Milwaukee, Wisconsin, the son of Norwegian immigrants. The eldest of three sons and two daughters, he attended schools in Norway, Belgium, the Netherlands, and the United States. His brother, Sigurd Roll, was also a diplomat and an Olympic sprinter.

== Career ==
When the U.S. entered World War I, Roll enlisted in the Army and was sent to Denmark to engage in covert activities in Germany, heading a team of six agents.

Following the war, the State Department appointed him Vice Consul in Denmark, where he served for two years under President Woodrow Wilson. The State Department then transferred Roll to Bremen, Germany, where he was stationed as Vice Consul for eight years. From then, till the outbreak of World War II, he continued to carry out missions for the State Department throughout the world.

With the entrance of the U.S. into the European theater of World War II, Roll returned to the Army and served on SHAEF under General Dwight Eisenhower. He saw duty on most of the major European fronts. When Lt. Colonel Roll learned of his brother Sigurd's death, he was determined to avenge him. Thus, on May 9, 1945, at the age of 53, Roll was the first American officer with the liberation army to land in Norway.

At the end of the war, the State Department kept Roll in Oslo as American Information Officer. In 1947, under President Harry Truman, he was transferred to Denmark as First Consul for Ambassador Eugenie Anderson. He retained this post for three years till he retired. Under Presidents Eisenhower and Truman, Roll was instrumental in organizing NATO for Northern Europe.

He was also Chief of the Marshall Plan in the Scandinavian countries and Chairman of the Board of Directors of the U.S. Education Foundation. During Roll's sojourn in Denmark, the King conferred knighthood on him, making him a Knight of the Order of the Dannebrog, an honor rarely bestowed on a non-Dane.

Colonel Roll died in 1967.

== Family ==
Roll was married to Gudrun Agerholm Roll. Their son, William George Roll II, born July 3, 1926, in Bremen, Germany was president of the Parapsychological Association.
