= Stigmatized property =

Real estate devalued due to social taboo

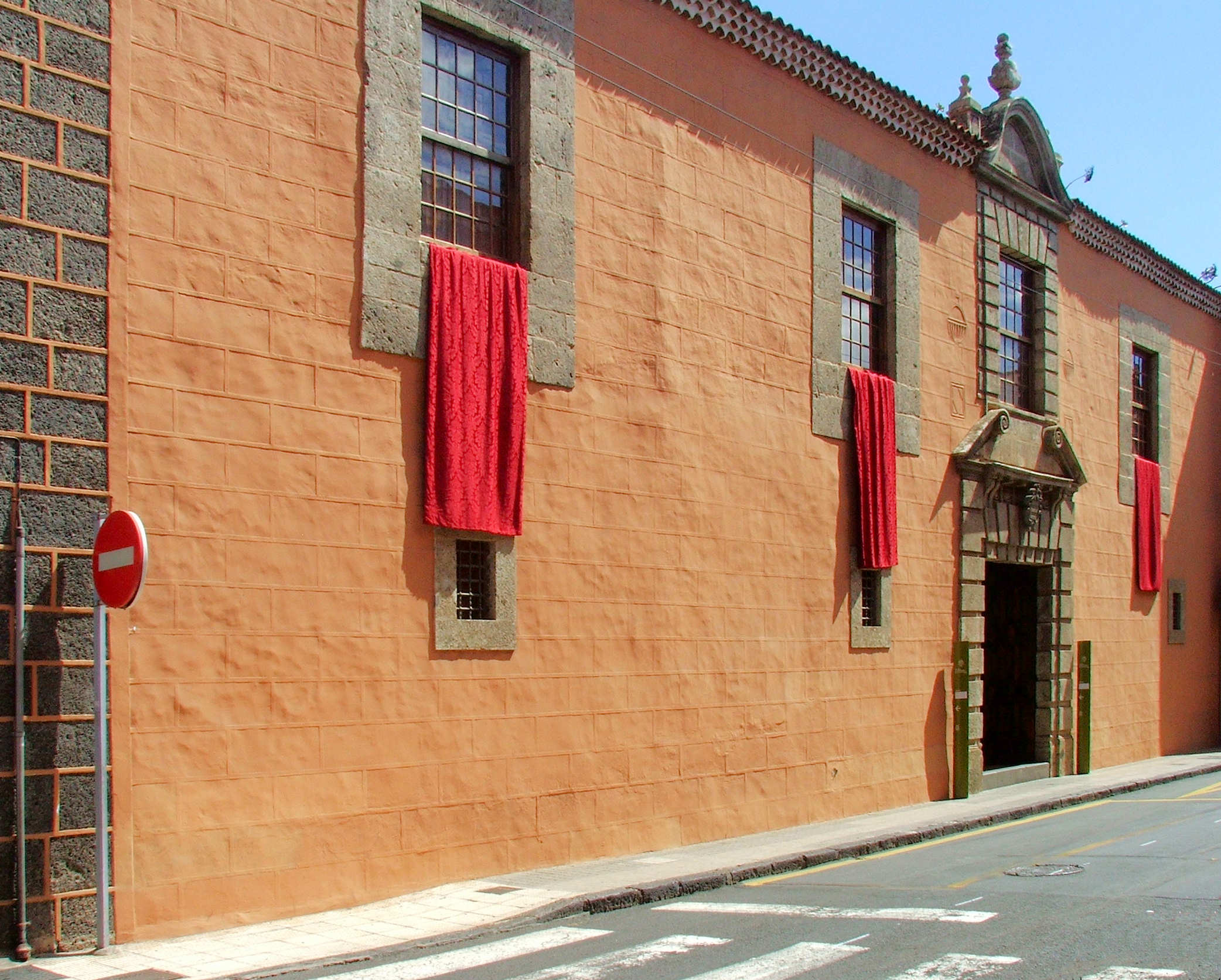
The Museum of the History of Tenerife, known locally as the Lercaro House, is reputedly haunted by the ghost of a young woman, the eponymous Catalina Lercaro.

In real estate, stigmatized property is property that buyers or tenants may shun for reasons that are unrelated to its physical condition or features. These can include death of an occupant, murder, suicide, previous illicit activities, and even the belief that a house is haunted.

Controversy exists regarding the definitions of stigma and what sorts of stigma must be disclosed at sale. It is argued that the seller has a duty to disclose any such history of the property. This, in practice, falls into two categories: demonstrable (physical) and emotional. Local jurisdictions vary widely in their interpretation of these issues and occasionally contradict federal law.

== Types of stigma ==
Many jurisdictions recognize several forms of stigmatized property, and have passed resolutions or statutes to deal with them. One issue that separates them is disclosure. Depending on the jurisdiction of the house, the seller may not be required to disclose the full facts. Some specific types must always be disclosed, others are up to the jurisdiction, and still others up to the realtor.

The types of stigma include:

- Criminal stigma: the property was used in the ongoing commission of a crime. For example, a house is stigmatized if it has been used as a brothel, chop shop, or drug den. In the case of drug dens, some drug addicts may inadvertently come to the address expecting to purchase illegal drugs. Most jurisdictions require full disclosure of this sort of element.
- Debt stigma: Debt collectors unaware that a debtor has moved out of a particular residence may continue their pursuit at the same location, resulting in harassment of innocent subsequent occupiers. This is particularly pronounced if the collection agency uses aggressive or illegal tactics.
- Minimal stigma is known to, or taken seriously by, only a small select group, and such a stigma is unlikely to affect the ability to sell the property; in such a case, realtors may decide to disclose this information in a case-by-case basis.
- Murder/suicide stigma: Some jurisdictions in the United States require property sellers to reveal if murder or suicide occurred on the premises. California state law does if the event occurred within the previous three years. Florida state law does not require any notification and protects sellers from lawsuits. In North Carolina, sellers and agents do not have to volunteer information about the death of previous occupants, but a direct question must be answered truthfully.
- Phenomena stigma: Many (but not all) jurisdictions require disclosure if a house is renowned for "haunting", ghost sightings, etc. This is in a separate category from public stigma, wherein the knowledge of "haunting" is restricted to a local market. Perceived paranormal activity is an indicator of a possible air quality hazard, such as carbon monoxide or toxic mold.
- Public stigma: when the stigma is known to a wide selection of the population and any reasonable person can be expected to know of it. Examples include the Amityville Horror house and the home of the Menéndez brothers. Public stigma must always be disclosed, in almost all American and European jurisdictions.

== Legal status ==
At least in the United States, the principle of caveat emptor ("let the buyer beware") was held for many years to govern sales. As the idea of an implied warranty of habitability began to find purchase, however, issues like the stigma attached to a property based on acts, "haunting", or criminal activity began to make their way into legal precedents.

In Stambovsky v. Ackley the New York Supreme Court, Appellate Division, affirmed a narrow interpretation of the idea of stigmatized property. The court held that since the property in question was previously marketed by the seller as a "haunted house" he was estopped from claiming the contrary. The majority opinion specifically noted that the veracity of the claims of paranormal activities were outside the purview of the opinion. Notwithstanding these conclusions, the court affirmed the dismissal of the fraudulent misrepresentation action and stated that the realtor was under no duty to disclose the haunting to potential buyers.

Several states have created specific statutes in the US adding "stigmatised property" verbiage to their legal code.

== Examples ==
Famous homes, such as those used in television productions or filmmaking, can also be stigmatized by increased traffic from fans wanting to see the house in person. One example is the house at 112 Ocean Avenue in Amityville, New York where Ronald DeFeo Jr. murdered his family, later made famous by best-selling book The Amityville Horror and numerous film adaptations. The Lutz family claimed the house was haunted by evil spirits who drove them out. Their claims are supported by paranormal investigators such as Ed and Lorraine Warren and Hans Holzer, but dismissed as fraudulent by skeptics such as Robert Todd Carroll. Since the film's release, the house has been renovated and the address changed in an attempt to prevent sightseers from disturbing the neighborhood.

Another example is the house at 74 Surfside Avenue in Montauk, New York, that belonged to Norman Kean, a Broadway producer who committed suicide in 1988 after stabbing his wife Gwyda Donhowe over 60 times. Actress Tuesday Weld bought the house in 1990, but when Weld decided to sell in 2006, it took three years for her to find a buyer. In 2009, she finally sold it for about $2.25 million under asking.

== See also ==
- Problem property
- Randall Bell
