= Problem property =

Problem property is terminology used by city governments seeking to apply pressure to the owners and managers of buildings where crime has occurred. "Problem property" is also used to describe any land or building that has negative issues associated with it, such as difficulty to sell, uncertain ownership, flooding, etc.

In the rental-property industry, the theory is that landlords have a duty to ensure tenants will not engage in criminal behavior that affects the quality of life of neighbors. And that the failure of some landlords to screen applicants appropriately for their units can lead to greater criminality and lower quality of life in some neighborhoods.

Critics claim that it is in the political interest of local-government officials and police to shift the blame for crime from the criminals and the responsibility for fighting crime themselves to nearby property owners. This is a common strategy in community policing.

== See also ==
- Stigmatized property
