= Tina Resch =

American criminal (born 1969)

Tina Resch (also goes by her full name Christina Elaine Boyer, born October 23, 1969) is an American woman, who was a central figure in a series of incidents that came to be called the Columbus poltergeist case. In 1984, alleged telekinesis events at her Columbus, Ohio home drew significant news media interest. A series of color photographs taken by photojournalist Fred Shannon, and published by The Columbus Dispatch, were purported to show Resch sitting in an armchair with a telephone handset and phone cord flying in front of her. Resch's story, and Shannon's photography, were featured on a 1993 episode of Unsolved Mysteries.

Skeptics and debunkers pointed out that much of the proclaimed evidence was anecdotal and thin and declared the case to be a hoax. Paul Kurtz wrote that Resch was "a disturbed teenager" who faked poltergeist phenomena because she "craved attention".

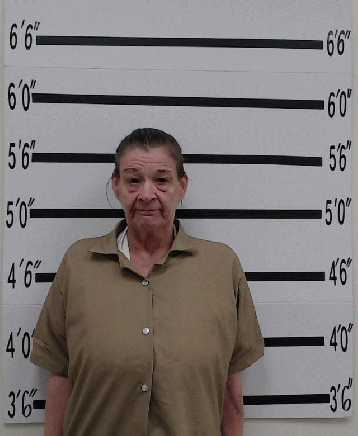
Boyer's mugshot

Resch was married and divorced twice, and had a child named Amber Boyer. In 1994, facing a potential death penalty if she agreed to go to trial before jury, Resch instead accepted a plea bargain with prosecutors to being responsible for the death of her three-year-old daughter that had occurred while the daughter was being looked after by her boyfriend, and she was sentenced to life imprisonment.

== Alleged poltergeist case ==
Tina Resch is the adopted daughter of Joan and John Resch, who were physically abusive to her. The Resches were well known in Columbus, as they were foster parents who had helped care for 250 children prior to 1984. When she was 14, Tina Resch watched the movie Poltergeist, and shortly afterward the family reported seeing objects fly around their house. Reporter Mike Harden of The Columbus Dispatch was asked to assist the family, and involved photographer Fred Shannon. The Columbus Dispatch interviewed Resch, and later published several photos purporting to show a telephone flying through the air.

Parapsychologist William Roll stayed in the Resch house to investigate the case, and claimed that there had been genuine "spontaneous psychokinesis". Roll, however, never observed any object move by itself. In one incident, a picture fell from a wall in an upstairs room where Tina Resch had been alone half an hour before; Roll was facing away from the picture when it fell. James Randi, an investigator for the Committee for the Scientific Investigation of Claims of the Paranormal was refused access to the household, but investigated the case and suspected she had faked the alleged poltergeist occurrences. According to Terence Hines:

The Resch poltergeist turned out to be so elusive that no one ever actually saw a single object even start to move of its own accord. This included the newspaper photographer, who found that if he watched an object, it stubbornly refused to budge. So he would hold up his camera and look away... One of the photos obtained in this way was distributed by the Associated Press and touted widely as proof of the reality of the phenomenon. Examined closely, the photographic evidence in this case strongly suggested that Tina was faking the occurrences by simply throwing the phone and other "flying" objects when no one was looking. Randi's careful analysis of the other photos, many unpublished, of Tina and her flying phone strengthened the conclusion that she was faking. The editor of The Columbus Dispatch, Luke Feck, embarrassed by the revelation that he and his paper were taken in by so obvious a fake, refused Randi permission to print the photos he had given him earlier, in an apparent attempt to suppress the evidence of Tina's trickery and the newspaper's credulity."

In a later incident, a visiting television crew inadvertently left a video camera on, which caught footage of Resch deliberately knocking over a table lamp, then screaming as if in fright, an event that had previously been ascribed to the poltergeist. When confronted with the videotape, she claimed she had done it so the reporters would leave. Randi characterized the situation as a hoax by an adolescent girl seeking attention, saying, "examination of available material indicates that fraudulent means or perfectly explainable methods have been employed to provide the media with sensational details about an otherwise trivial matter." Randi examined a roll of photos taken by press photographers and said that they showed the girl's foot hooked beneath a sofa that had purportedly moved by itself, and that the glass in a picture frame that allegedly shattered on its own while in her hands was already broken before she ever picked it up. His conclusion of the case, as he reported in Skeptical Inquirer, Spring 1985, was as follows:

The evidence for the validity of poltergeist claims in this case is anecdotal and thin, at best. The evidence against them is, in my estimation, strong and convincing.

== Conviction and imprisonment ==
Tina Resch married and divorced twice, changing her name to Christina Boyer, and had a daughter named Amber. In April 1992, at the age of three, Amber was found dead, suspected to have been beaten to death. Boyer and David Herrin, her boyfriend of a few months, were arrested and tried for the murder of Amber. Boyer was not present at the time of the death of her daughter, who had been left in Herrin's care at the time. The medical examiner at Herrin's trial testified that the cause of Amber's death was "blunt force trauma she received to her head", inflicted shortly before her death, and Boyer and Herrin blamed each other for the injuries. Even as the Unsolved Mysteries segment about Tina Resch premiered on May 19, 1993, Boyer was sitting in jail and awaiting trial. At the time, the Unsolved Mysteries segment made no mention of the criminal charges against her.

Boyer was charged with aggravated battery, and in October 1994, rather than face trial and the possibility of a death sentence, she agreed to a plea bargain negotiated by her attorney and District Attorney Peter Skandalakis. She entered an Alford plea, in which she pleaded guilty while maintaining her innocence. She received a life sentence plus 20 years, with the possibility of parole. Herrin was convicted of cruelty to children and sentenced to 20 years. He was released from Dooly State Prison on November 16, 2011.

The Atlanta Journal-Constitution referred to Boyer as the "Telekinetic Mom" in some of its reporting on the legal issues in 1994.

In 2004, William Roll collaborated with writer Valerie Storey on a book entitled Unleashed – Of Poltergeists and Murder: The Curious Story of Tina Resch. The book claims Tina possessed telekinetic powers and was innocent in the death of Amber.

Boyer was originally incarcerated at Pulaski State Prison in Hawkinsville, Georgia, since 2008, and is currently housed at McRae Correctional Facility in McRae, Georgia.

=== Campaign to free Boyer ===
Tina Resch refers to herself as Christina Boyer. In 2013, photographer Jan Banning obtained permission to take pictures of prisoners in the Pulaski State Prison, including Resch/Boyer. Five years later, Banning took a sabbatical year during which he started to investigate Christina Boyer's case, suspecting that she may not have had a fair trial. Banning's attempts to obtain parole for Resch/Boyer resulted in a podcast, published by Dutch public radio. Banning wrote a book in which he explains how and why he became convinced that Resch/Boyer was likely not guilty of killing her daughter Amber. The Christina Boyer case has also been the subject of a film and a three part documentary. Banning used his connections to form a team that is working on setting Resch/Boyer free, but as of June 2025, Resch/Boyer was still in prison.
