= American Board of Medicolegal Death Investigators =

The American Board of Medicolegal Death Investigators (ABMDI) is an independent not-for-profit certification board based in Baltimore, MD that works to encourage and enhance professional standards among medicolegal death investigators (individuals involved in establishing the cause of death and the identification of the deceased).

== History ==
The American Board of Medicolegal Death Investigators (ABMDI) was founded in February 1998, following research by the Chief Medical Examiner of Milwaukee, Dr Jeffrey Jantzen, which revealed a lack of regulation in the skills needed for medicolegal death investigations. No particular education was required to practice as a death investigator, and training was provided 'on the job'. The ABMDI was therefore established to test and certify medicolegal death investigators on a national level.

== Mission ==
The purpose of the American Board of Medicolegal Death Investigators is as follows:

- To encourage adherence to high standards of professional practice and ethical conduct when performing medicolegal death investigations.
- To recognize qualified individuals who have voluntarily applied for basic and advanced levels of professional certification.
- To grant and issue certificates to individuals who have demonstrated their mastery of investigational techniques and who have successfully completed rigorous examination of their knowledge and skills in the field of medicolegal death investigation.
- To maintain a listing of individuals granted ABMDI certification.
- To recertify individuals every five years according to established professional recertification criteria, including continuing education requirements and work verification.

== Certification process ==
The Registry Certification (Basic) is the initial certification that provides official recognition that an individual has acquired basic knowledge and demonstrated proficiency in the standards of practice necessary to properly conduct a competent, thorough medicolegal death investigation.

=== Eligibility ===
1. Must be at least eighteen years of age at time of application.
2. Must have a high school diploma or equivalent.
3. Must currently be employed in a Medical Examiner or Coroner office or equivalent military authority with the job responsibility to "conduct death scene investigations" at time of application and examination.
4. Must have a minimum of 640 hours of death investigation experience
5. Each on-call hour = 0.25 hours
6. Investigation of a natural death, no scene investigation = 1 hour
7. Investigation of non-natural death, no scene investigation = 2.5 hours
8. Investigation of a death with scene investigation = 5 hours

Currently, the ABMDI does not endorse any program that claims to fulfill the requirements of certification or prepare an individual for the certification exam.

=== Examination ===
The present examination for the ABMDI registry exam consists of a 240 multiple choice examination covering the following eight sections:

1. Interacting with Federal, State and Local Agencies
2. Communicating
3. Interacting with Families
4. Investigating Deaths
5. Identifying and Preserving Evidence
6. Maintaining Ethical and Legal Responsibilities
7. Demonstrating Scientific Knowledge
8. Coping with Job-Related Stress

=== Board Certification ===
The board certification exam, a more advanced level of certification available to investigators who are already registry certified, consists of an additional 240-question multiple choice examination, as well as a "performance" section that requires the evaluation of three hypothetical death scenes, requiring the applicant to:

1. Write narrative descriptions of death scenes using medical terminology
2. Develop sets of questions that could be used to interview witnesses and/or suspects
3. Develop a lists of pieces of potential evidence

== Current work ==
A main part of ABMDI's work is the certification examination; after this initial certification, continued training and education is required for recertification. As of 2007, there were approximately 800 ABMDI-registered death investigators.
