= Helios Foundation =

Registered charity in Kings Cross, London

The Helios Foundation
- Founded: 1982
- Type: Charitable organisation
- Registration no.: 1160233
- Purpose: HIV and Health, Health policy
- Location: 116 Judd Street, London WC1H 9NS WC1X 8DP
- Coordinates: 51.5276°N 0.1250°W
- Region served: United Kingdom
- Key people: Greg Branson, CEO
- Revenue: Pound sterling £168,000 (2015)
- Employees: 3 + 53 sessional (2015)
- Volunteers: 30 (2015)
- Website: helioscentre.org.uk

The Helios Foundation, is a registered charity based in Kings Cross, London. Their mission is to advance the study and practice of the arts and sciences pertaining to holistic health.

== History ==
Established in 1982 to provide counselling, psychotherapy and healing to people with long term illness and those suffering discrimination, particularly those with LGBT issues resulting in psychological stress and trauma.

Helios responded to the AIDS crisis and, in 1987, started to run support groups for those affected. In 1992, they moved into their Kings Cross premises and began to provide a wide range of complementary therapy options alongside the psychotherapy needed to deal with the trauma of having this condition when there was no effective drug therapy available.

Therapies included: psychodynamic & person centred counselling, psychotherapy, life coaching, couple counselling and hypnotherapy alongside 28 different complementary therapies including acupuncture, osteopathy, ayurveda, reflexology, and nutrition.

In 1998, the Helios all-embracing approach to health was studied by Professor Colin Francome of the Middlesex University and he concluded that: “the results of this survey show very clearly that the HIV programmes provided by the Helios Foundation do bring considerable benefit to the participants. The medical results were impressive and markedly superior to outcomes and trends reported elsewhere, particularly with regard to mortality.” Only 5 Helios clients died over this period, an exceptional result. A further study, in 2007, confirmed and updated these results.

In 2008, the charity’s founder and director, Greg Branson, received the Exceptional Carer award from the London Borough of Camden.

In 2010, the charity received a 5-year Big Lottery ‘Reaching Communities’ grant for counselling and support services to BME HIV+ women, LGBT seniors and HIV+ people returning to work.

== Services ==
Helios does outreach providing services for clients of the Mildmay Hospice, Food Chain, Positive UK and many others.

In recent years, the charity’s remit has been extended to serve people with a wide range of psychological issues alongside physical conditions such as cancer, hepatitis and lupus. The individual programmes of treatment are drawn from:

- Nutrition, naturopathy and natural remedies,
- Groups to address lifestyle issues,
- Physical and subtle therapies - such as lymph drainage & acupuncture,
- A wide range of psychological therapies,
- Advocacy for disabled clients facing sanctions and loss of benefits, and
- Spiritual practices – including mindfulness meditation, yoga and qi gong.

Helios uses a dual approach that considers both the physical and psychological aspects.
