= Gef =

Supposed talking mongoose

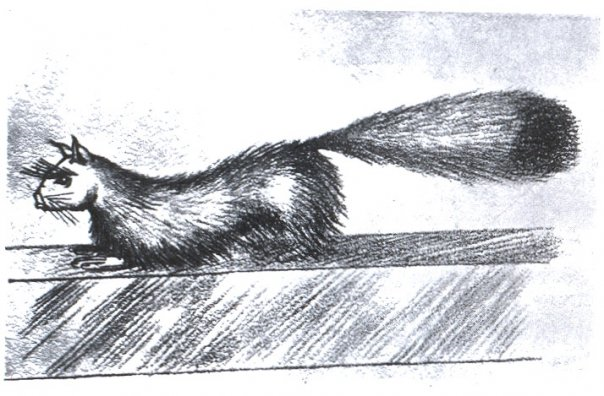
George Scott's sketch of Gef the talking mongoose, from 1936

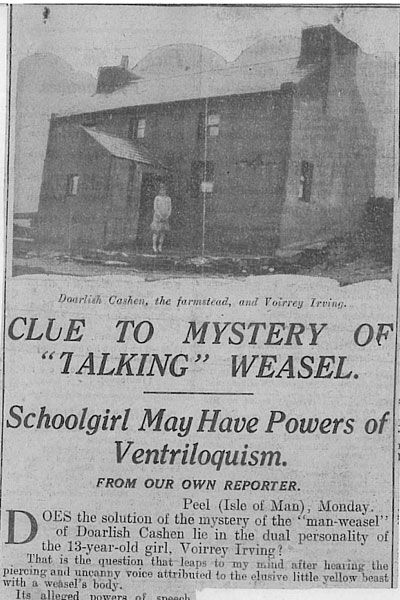
A 1932 article that suggested trickery and ventriloquism from Voirrey Irving was the cause of the Gef phenomena

Gef (/ˈdʒɛf/ JEF), also referred to as the Talking Mongoose or the Dalby Spook, was an allegedly talking mongoose which inhabited a farmhouse owned by the Irving family, located at Cashen's Gap near the hamlet of Dalby on the Isle of Man. The story was given extensive coverage by the tabloid press in Britain in the early 1930s. The Irvings' claims gained the attention of parapsychologists and ghost hunters, such as Harry Price, Hereward Carrington, and Nandor Fodor. Some investigators of the era as well as contemporary critics have concluded that the phenomenon was a hoax that the Irving family perpetuated by using ventriloquism.

== Story ==
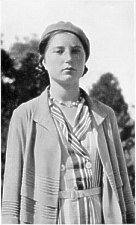
Voirrey Irving

In September 1931, the Irving family, consisting of James, Margaret, and a 13-year-old daughter named Voirrey, claimed they heard persistent scratching, rustling, and vocal noises behind their farmhouse's wooden wall panels that variously resembled a ferret, a dog, or a baby. According to the Irvings, a creature named Gef introduced itself and told them it was a mongoose born in New Delhi, India, in 1852. According to James Irving, Gef was the size of a small rat with yellowish fur and a large bushy tail.

The Irvings claimed that Gef had communicated to them that he was "an extra extra clever mongoose", an "Earthbound spirit" and "a ghost in the form of a weasel" and once said, "I am a freak. I have hands and I have feet, and if you saw me you'd faint, you'd be petrified, mummified, turned into stone or a pillar of salt!" The Irvings made various claims about Gef: he supposedly guarded their house and informed them of the approach of guests or any unfamiliar dog; if someone forgot to put out the fire at night, Gef would go down and stop the stove; Gef would also wake people up when they overslept; and whenever mice got into the house, Gef supposedly assumed the role of a cat, although he preferred to scare them rather than killing them. According to the Irvings' words, they gave Gef biscuits, chocolates, and bananas, with food left for him in a saucer suspended from the ceiling which he took when he thought no one was watching. The mongoose regularly accompanied them on their trips to the market, but always stayed on the other side of the hedges, chatting incessantly.

The story of Gef became popular in the tabloid press, and many journalists flocked to the Isle to try to catch a glimpse of the creature. Many other people, both locals and visitors, claimed to have heard Gef's voice, but only a handful claimed to have seen it. When Arthur Morrison visited the Irving home, he claimed that when Gef spoke to him from under the bed he slept in at the home, he could see a pair of yellow eyes. Two teenagers named Will Cubbon and Henry Hall claimed to see Gef in Cubbon's own yard and described him as yellow with a black spot on his tail. However, physical evidence was lacking. Footprints, stains on the wall, and hair samples claimed to be evidence of Gef were identified as belonging to the Irvings' sheepdog, as were several photos which were claimed by the Irvings to depict Gef.

Margaret and Voirrey Irving left the home in 1945 after the death of James Irving. They reportedly had to sell the farm at a loss because it had the reputation of being haunted. In 1946, Leslie Graham, who had bought their farm, claimed in the press that he had shot and killed Gef. The body displayed by Graham was, however, black and white and much larger than the famous mongoose and Voirrey Irving was certain that it was not Gef.

Voirrey died in 2005. In an interview published late in life, she maintained that Gef was not her creation.

== Psychic investigations ==
=== Harry Price ===
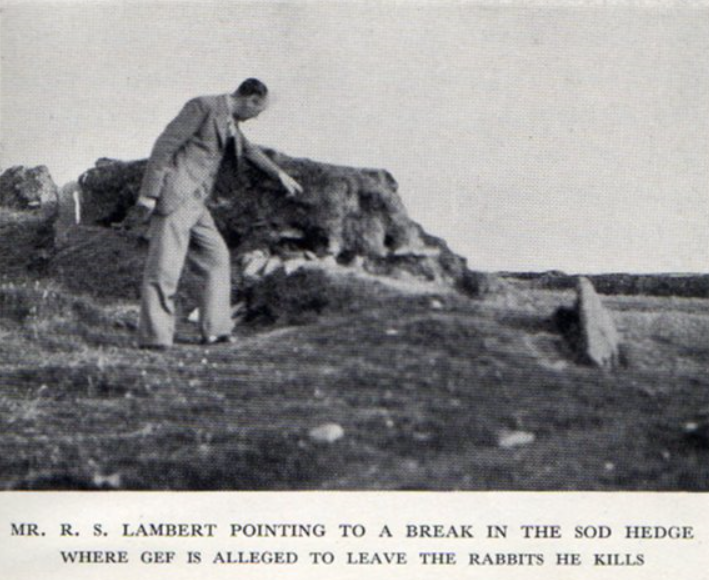
Richard S. Lambert investigating the site

In July 1935, the editor of The Listener, Richard S. Lambert (known as "Rex"), and his friend, paranormal investigator Harry Price, went to the Isle of Man to investigate the case and produced the book The Haunting of Cashen's Gap (1936). They avoided saying that they believed the story but were careful to report it objectively. The book reports how a hair from the alleged mongoose was sent to Julian Huxley, who then sent it to naturalist F. Martin Duncan, who identified it as a dog hair. Price suspected the hair belonged to the Irvings' sheepdog, Mona.

Price asked Reginald Pocock of the Natural History Museum to evaluate pawprints allegedly made by Gef in plasticene together with an impression of his supposed tooth marks. Pocock could not match them to any known animal, though he conceded that one of them might have been "conceivably made by a dog". He did state that none of the markings had been made by a mongoose. The diaries of James Irving, along with reports about the case, are in Harry Price's archives in the Senate House Library, University of London.

Upon visiting the Irvings, Price observed double walls of wooden panelling covering the interior rooms of the old stone farmhouse which featured considerable interior air space between stone, as well as walls, also made of wood, that "[made] the whole house one great speaking-tube, with walls like sound boards. By speaking into one of the many apertures in the panels, it should be possible to convey the voice to various parts of the house." According to Richard Wiseman, "Price and Lambert were less than enthusiastic about the case, concluding that only the most credulous of individuals would be impressed with the evidence for Gef."

=== Nandor Fodor ===
Nandor Fodor, Research Officer for the International Institute for Psychical Research, stayed at the Irvings' house for a week without seeing or hearing Gef. Fodor disbelieved any deliberate deception had occurred and moulded a complex psychological theory to explain Gef based on "a split-off part" of Jim Irving's personality.

== Critical reception ==
Although some psychic investigators thought that Gef was a poltergeist or another type of ghost, sceptics, including residents of the Isle of Man, believed the Irving family had colluded to perpetuate a hoax that was originated by daughter Voirrey. An Isle of Man Examiner reporter wrote that when he caught the girl making noises, her father tried to convince him the sound came from somewhere else. According to Joe Nickell, researchers have suspected Voirrey used ventriloquism and other tricks "the effects of which were hyped by family members, reporters in search of a story, and credulous paranormalists."

Contemporary media scholar Jeffrey Sconce writes that the most likely explanation is that "this extra extra clever mongoose was an imaginary companion created by the Irvings' extra extra clever daughter."

== Lambert slander case ==
In 1937, Lambert brought an action for slander against Sir Cecil Levita, after Levita suggested to a friend that Lambert was unfit to be on the board of the British Film Institute. Levita said that Lambert was "off his head" because he had believed in the talking mongoose and the evil eye.

Lambert was pressured to abandon his action by Sir Stephen Tallents; he persisted and won, receiving £7,600 in damages. It was an exceptional figure for a slander case, awarded because Lambert's counsel managed to introduce a BBC memo that showed Lambert's career had been threatened if he persisted with the action; it later became known as "the Mongoose Case".

== Gallery ==
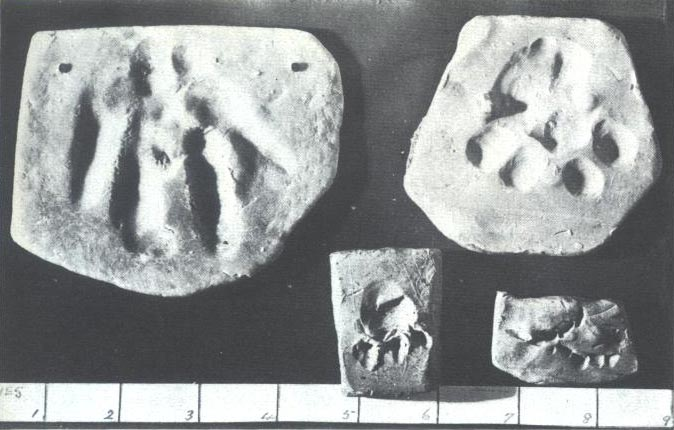
Alleged foot tracks and teeth marks from Gef

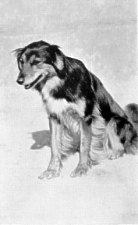
Mona, the Irvings' sheep dog

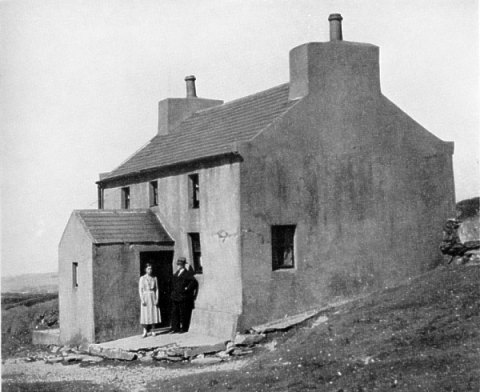
Mr. James Irving and daughter Voirrey at their house

== In media ==
- Lemon Demon's 2009 song "Eighth Wonder", is written about Gef and contains many of Gef's alleged statements. The original song was 5:10 long, however, an alternative abridged mix of the song was released on the 2016 album Spirit Phone.
- Gef! The Strange Tale of an Extra-Special Talking Mongoose (ISBN 9781907222481), by Christopher Josiffe, a nonfiction account of the case, was published by Strange Attractor Press in 2017.
- Gef and Fodor's investigation are core to the plot of the audio drama "The Dalby Spook", released as a part of Doctor Who: The Eighth Doctor Adventures: What Lies Inside? (ISBN 9781838687526), by Lauren Mooney and Stewart Pringle, and published by Big Finish Productions in 2022.
- The Fodor investigation into Gef is central in the 2023 film Nandor Fodor and the Talking Mongoose starring Simon Pegg, Minnie Driver and Christopher Lloyd, with Neil Gaiman as the voice of Gef.
- The opera Gef!, by composer Sam Meredith and librettist Sophia Trewick, was inspired by the Lambert and Price investigation and performed at the Guildhall School of Music and Drama in 2025.

== See also ==
- The Brief Wondrous Life of Oscar Wao, a 2007 novel featuring a talking mongoose
- Hoover the talking seal
- Talking animal
