= Arthur Findlay =

British accountant, stockbroker and magistrate (1883–1964)

Arthur Findlay MBE, JP
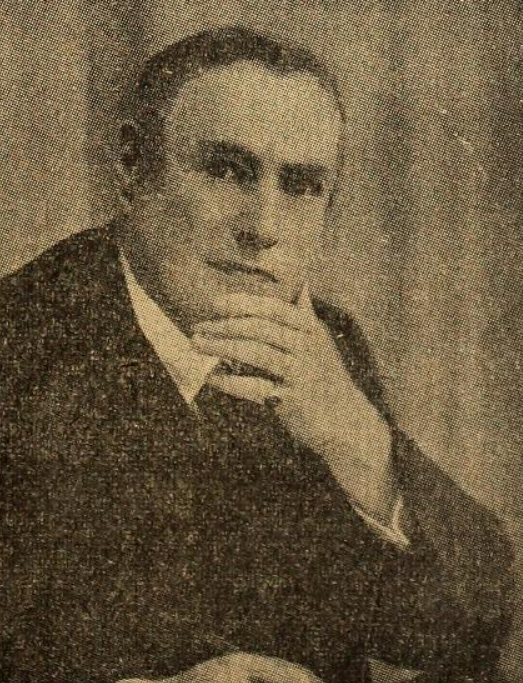
- Born: James Arthur Findlay; 16 May 1883; Glasgow, Scotland
- Died: 24 July 1964 (aged 81)
- Occupations: Accountant, stockbroker, magistrate

Arthur Findlay MBE, JP (16 May 1883 – 24 July 1964) was a writer, accountant, stockbroker and Essex magistrate, as well as a significant figure in the history of the religion of Spiritualism, being a partial founder of the newspaper Psychic News and also a founder of the International Institute for Psychical Research. In his will he left his home, Stansted Hall, to the Spiritualists' National Union. Findlay's spiritualist views about an etheric body were criticized as non-scientific.

== Biography ==
=== Early life ===
Aged 17, James Arthur Findlay had become interested in the field of comparative religion, something of which his staunchly Christian parents disapproved of - they even burned many of his books on the subject.

In 1913, he was awarded the title of Member of The Most Excellent Order of the British Empire (MBE) for his organisation work for the Red Cross.

=== John Sloan ===
In 1918, Findlay attended a séance with the direct voice medium John Campbell Sloan at a spiritualist church in Glasgow. During the next five years Findlay attended many seances at the medium's home and became convinced spirit voices were speaking through Sloan. However, the psychical researcher J. Malcolm Bird investigated Sloan and wrote he had no doubt that all the voices heard could be produced by the medium talking into the trumpet in a normal fashion. Bird also wrote the information given to the sitters could have easily been taken from public records and there was a lack of control in the séances. Bird wrote that "the phenomena themselves were not particularly impressive; with the intermittent freedom of the medium, it seemed simple enough for him to have done most of them himself."

Findlay's On the Edge of the Etheric (1931) defended Sloan's direct voice mediumship and supported the existence of an etheric body. The book was negatively reviewed in the journal Nature as anti-scientific. According to the review "from reading Mr. Findlay's records, the scientific method might be thought not to exist. He seems to have no appreciation of the implications underlying many of his remarks; no desire to see the phenomena described in accurate and scientific terminology."

=== Spiritualism ===
Findlay in 1920 founded the Glasgow Society for Psychical Research. In 1923, he took part in the Church of Scotland's enquiry into psychic phenomena. In the same year, he retired from his profession and purchased Stansted Hall in Stansted, England, a manor house built in 1871.

In 1932, he became a founding member of Psychic News, a Spiritualist newspaper, along with Hannen Swaffer and Maurice Barbanell. He helped to found the International Institute for Psychical Research, of which he became the chairman. He also became an honorary member of both the American Foundation for Psychical Research, Edinburgh Psychic College and the honorary president of both the Institute of Psychic Writers and Artists and the Spiritualists' National Union.

In his will, he left Stansted Hall to the Spiritualists' National Union as a college for the advancement of Psychic Science, which was named the Arthur Findlay College of Psychic Science after him.

=== Thornton Heath poltergeist ===
In 1938, the psychical researcher Nandor Fodor investigated the Thornton Heath poltergeist case that involved Mrs. Forbes. According to Rosemary Guiley, "Fodor asserted that the psychosis was an episodic mental disturbance of schizophrenic character, and that Mrs. Forbes' unconscious mind was responsible for the activities finally determined to be fraudulent. Fodor eventually identified the cause as sexual trauma that had occurred in Mrs. Forbes's childhood, and had been repressed." Because he was skeptical of the case, Fodor was heavily criticized by spiritualists and was dismissed from his post at the International Institute for Psychical Research. Findlay, the founder of the Institute, did not approve of his research and resigned. Fodor was attacked in the Spiritualist newspaper Psychic News, which he sued for libel.

== Bibliography ==
=== On Spiritualism ===
- On The Edge Of The Etheric: Being An Investigation Of Psychic Phenomena, 1931, in which Findley examines the theory that spirits are linked to subatomic physics.
- The Unfolding Universe or The Evolution of Man's Conception of His Place in Nature, 1935
- The Psychic Stream, 1939
- Where Two Worlds Meet, 1951, about Findley's encounters with the medium John Sloan.
- The Way of Life, 1953
- Looking Back: The Autobiography of a Spiritualist, 1955

=== On Other Religions ===
- The Rock Of Truth, 1933, a history of the persecution of mediums by Christianity
- The Curse of Ignorance Volumes I and II, 1947, the devastating effects of ignorance on the history of humanity, ignorance of our true nature as human beings, as well as what really leads to happiness and contentment; includes a criticism of various economic systems and organised religion like Christianity
- The Effect of Religion On History (booklet)
- A History of Mankind Volumes I and II

=== Fiction ===
- The Torch of Knowledge: A Story About the Twentieth Century, and the Changes which Will Take Place as the Result of Increased Knowledge, 1936
