= Edwin F. Bowers =

Alternative medicine proponent in early 20th century United States

Edwin Frederick Bowers
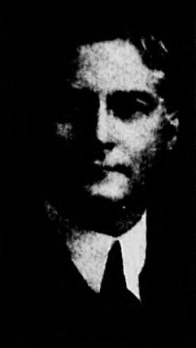
- Born: 1871
- Occupations: Alternative medicine proponent, spiritualist

Edwin Frederick Bowers (born 1871), best known as Edwin F. Bowers was an American alternative medicine proponent. Styling himself as a medical doctor, he is known for pioneering reflexology during the early decades of the twentieth century.

== Career ==
Bowers with William H. Fitzgerald had invented "Zone therapy", a form of reflexology. In 1917, they collaborated on a book titled Zone Therapy. It has been widely criticized as there is no evidence it is beneficial for any medical condition and has been dismissed as quackery.

Bowers' credentials were called into question. In 1929, the American Medical Association stated:

Although for years he has termed himself a physician, in attempts to capitalize the deceit, our records show that Bowers is not a graduate in medicine, never attended any medical college as a student of medicine and is not licensed to practice medicine in any state in the Union... Bowers has written reams of quasi-scientific buncombe both in popular magazines and cheap medical journals. He has puffed nostrums, quackeries and commercialized fads, medical and others.

Nutritionist Bernarr Macfadden promoted Bowers as a doctor of medicine. However, physician Morris Fishbein wrote that "Dr. Bowers is not a doctor of medicine, and the only M.D. he has is the one Macfadden gives him."

== Position on facial hair ==
In Britain and America of the nineteenth century, male facial hair was considered acceptable or even desirable, with luxurious growth being the ideal. However, as the germ theory of disease became more accepted, the public was urged to eschew items such as long, street-sweeping ladies' dresses and other germ-harboring areas, in order to remove germ contamination. By the 1900s, beards and mustaches themselves were deemed dangerous. In 1916, Bowers contributed an article to McClure's Magazine, calling for clean-shaven faces:

There is no way of computing the number of bacteria and noxious germs that may lurk in the Amazonian jungles of a well-whiskered face, but their number must be legion. Measles, scarlet fever, diphtheria, tuberculosis, whooping cough, common and uncommon colds, and a host of other infectious diseases can be, and undoubtedly are, transmitted via the whisker route.

== Spiritualism ==
Bowers was a convinced spiritualist. He had defended the fraudulent medium Frank Decker. In his book Spiritualism's Challenge, Bowers made incorrect statements about a magician and was threatened with a lawsuit from the Society of American Magicians. He later removed the incorrect statements from his book.

Bowers held séances at his home in West End Avenue, New York City. At one of these séances, professional photographer William van der Weyde produced an alleged spirit photograph of deceased psychical researcher James H. Hyslop. Bowers and other spiritualists were convinced the photograph was genuine. According to Fulton Oursler the photograph was a fake. Weyde had taken a photograph of Hyslop before his death and had a plate in his possession that had never been developed.

== Publications ==
- Alcohol: Its Influence on Mind and Body (1916)
- Eating for Health and Efficiency (1916)
- Side-Stepping Ill Health (1916)
- Bathing for Health: A Simple Way to Physical Fitness (1917)
- Zone Therapy [with William H. Fitzgerald] (1917)
- Teeth & Health: How to Lengthen Life and Increase Happiness by Proper Care (1921) [with Thomas J. Ryan]
- Charm and Personality (1934)
- Spiritualism's Challenge: Submitting to Modern Thinkers Conclusive Evidence of Survival (1936)
- Know Your Prostate: The Dangerous Age of Man (1945)
