= Frank Decker =

Frank Decker may refer to:

- Frank Decker (baseball)
- Frank Decker (medium)
- Frank Decker (Record Album Art Director)
