= Psychic News =

British newspaper

- Type: Weekly newspaper
- Format: Tabloid
- Founder: Maurice Barbanell
- Publisher: Psychic Press Ltd; Spiritual Truth Foundation; Spiritualists' National Union
- Founded: 1932
- Ceased publication: 2010
- Website: psychicnews.org.uk

Psychic News was a weekly British Spiritualist newspaper published from 1932 to July 2010, and revived with a change in ownership in December 2011.

== History, 1932–2010 ==
The first issue of the paper was published on 28 May 1932. The name of the paper was devised by one of its founding editors, Maurice Barbanell, who said that he was told to use it by his spirit guide. The other founding members were Hannen Swaffer, a Fleet Street journalist, and Arthur Findlay, a notable figure in the history of Spiritualism in Britain.

Managing Director for a period between 1941–1945 was Bernard Abdy Collins C.I.E Who during the same period worked for the Ministry of Security. He also wrote three books: The Cheltenham Ghost, The Whole Case for Survival and Death is Not the End.

In 1938 psychical researcher Nandor Fodor was attacked in the Psychic News newspaper for his skeptical evaluation of the Thornton Heath poltergeist case. Fodor sued the newspaper for libel.

The publisher of Psychic News from 1932 to 1980 was Psychic Press Ltd. The newspaper was next supported by the Spiritual Truth Foundation (STF). In 1995 the Spiritualists National Union (SNU) acquired it, and both the publishing and bookshop departments were relocated to Stansted Hall—better known as The Arthur Findlay College.

With the rise of the Internet PN added a web site, which included a bookstore and back issue division for online sales.

== Closure and relaunch, 2010–present ==
In July 2010 Psychic News abruptly ceased publication and both its print and web site divisions were closed. The SNU said that it had liquidated the publication due to financial losses.

In 2011 the paper resumed publication with issue #4067 dated 17 December 2011, after the publisher was purchased by the JV Trust in October of that year. Psychic News at some point was relaunched as a 64-page glossy monthly magazine. In 2024, JV Trust told the magazine it will stop subsidizing the publication. Unable to cover losses, a GoFundMe was launched to raise £30,000 to help keep Psychic News operating until it can become self-sufficient.

== Topics covered ==
Although the primary focus of the Psychic News was always Spiritualism, and it was strongly associated with the SNU even before that organization acquired ownership of it, it was the policy of PN to cover a wide variety of subjects of interest to its readers. For instance, in November 1947 the paper covered the fact that a committee of Anglican ministers had supported Spiritualism in 1936 and that the report had been suppressed by the Anglican Church. This investigative report by the Psychic News caused the Psychic News itself to become the topic of articles in The New York Times and the Los Angeles Times.

In the 1950s and 1960s, with the rise of the neopagan religion of Wicca, several articles about Wicca and witchcraft were published in the magazine, including "Genuine Witchcraft Is Defended" by Robert Cochrane. From that time forward the newspaper dealt with other paranormal, supernatural and New Age topics in addition to spiritualism.

== Reception ==
The newspaper has been criticized for biased reporting and endorsing fraudulent mediums and psychics as genuine. Early articles by Psychic News had supported the materialization medium Helen Duncan. An article in Psychic News claimed that Uri Geller had utilized psychokinetic power based on an incident with a bracelet; an article in the New Scientist cast doubt on the incident and described Geller's feats as magician's tricks.
