= Lajos Pap =

Hungarian carpenter and spiritualist medium

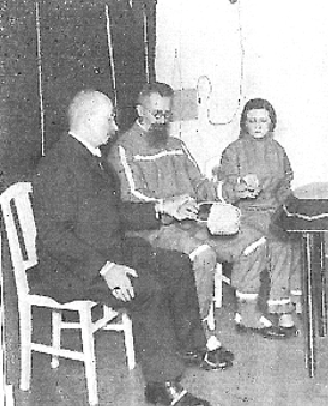
Lajos Pap (middle) in 1938

Lajos Pap (1883–1941) was a Hungarian carpenter and spiritualist medium.

== Career ==
Lajos Pap was originally investigated by Hungarian psychical researcher Elemér Chengery Pap in the 1920s in a series of experimental séances. He was alleged to have produced apport and psychokinetic phenomena. Various dead and living animals were discovered after his séances such as frogs, lizards, mice and snakes. Chengery Pap stored many of these specimens in a museum. However, it was destroyed during World War II and only photographs remain. The scientific reception to the experiments was not favourable. In 1928, Theodore Besterman from the Society for Psychical Research attended séances and concluded the phenomena were fraudulent.

In 1935, Lajos Pap was investigated by the International Institute for Psychical Research in London by the psychoanalyst Nandor Fodor. He reported that the phenomena were fraudulent and not evidence for the paranormal. During the séance a dead snake appeared. Pap was searched and was found to be wearing a device under his robe, where he had hidden the snake.

Other psychical researchers such as Harry Price also considered Pap to be a fraud and his mediumship discredited.
