= D. F. Fraser-Harris =

Scottish professor and a writer

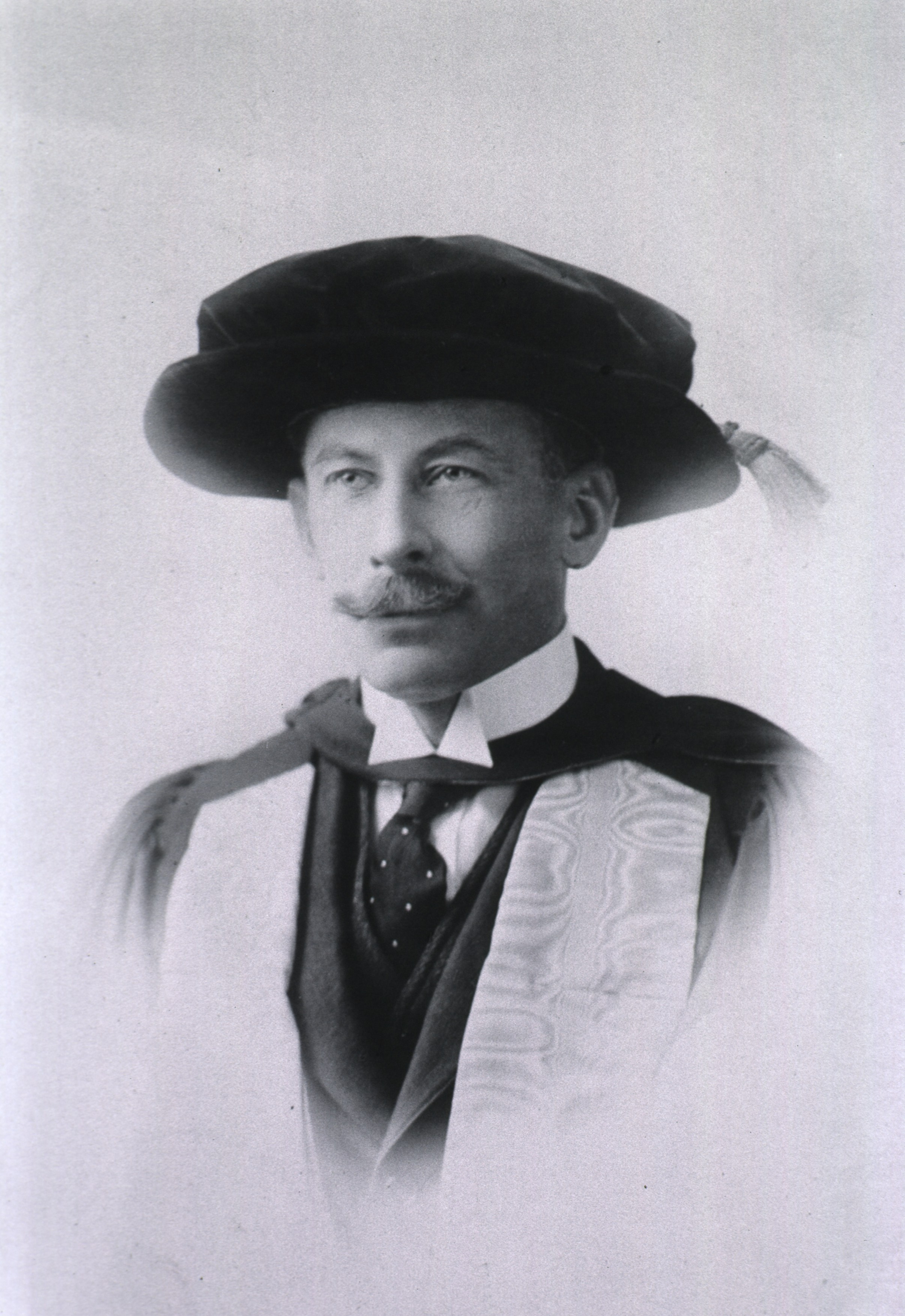
- Fraser-Harris in 1916
- Born: 24 February 1867; Edinburgh, Scotland
- Died: 3 January 1937 (aged 69)
- Occupations: Physiologist, parapsychologist

David Fraser Fraser-Harris (24 February 1867 – 3 January 1937), best known as D. F. Fraser-Harris, was a Scottish Professor of physiology and a writer.

== Biography ==
Fraser-Harris was born in Edinburgh. He studied medicine and physiology at the University of Glasgow, where he obtained his MBCM (1893) and M.D. (1897). He was the senior assistant of physiology at Glasgow (1893–1898) and was professor of physiology at the University of St. Andrews (1898–1908). He lectured at University of Birmingham where he obtained his D.Sc.

Fraser-Harris joined the Physiological Society in 1902 and was a founding member of the Biochemical Society. He spent a long period of time in Canada. He was professor of physiology at Dalhousie University (1911–1924). He retired in London, where he wrote books on many subjects.

== Parapsychology ==
Fraser-Harris was interested in parapsychology. He was associated with the National Laboratory of Psychical Research and attended séances with spiritualist mediums such as Helen Duncan and Rudi Schneider.

He was the Research Officer of the International Institute for Psychical Research for a few months but resigned in June, 1934.

== Selected publications ==
- The Functional Inertia of Living Matter: A Contribution to the Physiological Theory of Life (1908)
- Some Physiological Aspects of Referred Pain (1912)
- The Chemical Basis of Life (1912)
- Nerves (1913)
- The Man Who Discovered the Circulation of the Blood (1913)
- How We Defend Ourselves From Our Foes (1914)
- Shakespeare and Biological Science (1916)
- Life and Science (1924)
- Coloured Thinking and Other Studies in Science and Literature (1928)
- Morpheus, Or, The Future of Sleep (1928)
- The A B C of Nerves (1928)
- The Sixth Sense, and Other Studies in Modern Science (1928)
- The Rhythms of Life and other Essays in Science (1929)
