= Richard S. Lambert =

English biographer, popular historian and broadcaster (1894–1981)

Richard Stanton Lambert
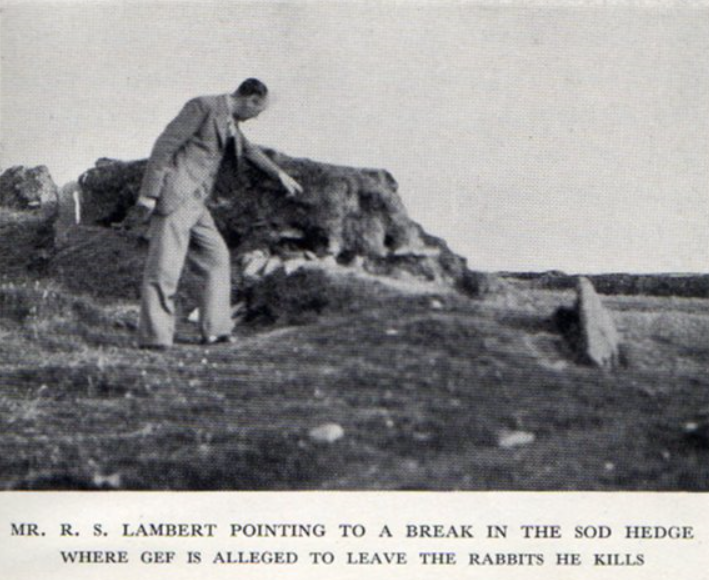
- Born: 25 August 1894; Kingston upon Thames, southwest London, England
- Died: 27 November 1981 (aged 87); Victoria, British Columbia, Canada
- Occupations: Biographer, broadcaster, historian, psychical researcher

Richard Stanton Lambert (25 August 1894 – 27 November 1981) was an English biographer, popular historian and broadcaster. He was also the founding editor of The Listener and an employee of the BBC and CBC. His books mainly concern history and biography but he also wrote about crime, travel, art, radio, film and propaganda. In Ariel and All His Quality he wrote about his time with the BBC in its formative years. Propaganda, published in 1939, was a timely investigation of a subject already made familiar during World War I.

For Franklin of the Arctic: a life of adventure, published by McClelland and Stewart in 1949, Lambert won both the first Governor General's Award for Juvenile Fiction and the third Canadian Library Association Book of the Year for Children Award.

== Life ==
Lambert was born in Kingston upon Thames, England, and was the son of Richard Cornthwaite Lambert a barrister and Liberal Party politician. He was educated at Repton School and Wadham College, Oxford, where he studied Classics. Some of his poems were published in the Oxford University literary magazine Oxford Poetry, then in its formative years. After leaving Oxford, he worked as a sub-editor with The Economist from 1914–1915, joining the staff in 1916.

During World War I, he served with the Friends' Ambulance Unit (FAU), from 1916–1918. In a 1971 retrospective, he records that he was a C.O. (conscientious objector), to which fact he ascribed a difficulty in finding a job in the post-war years. However, he found part-time work at Sheffield University teaching economics and history to extramural groups of Yorkshire miners and railwaymen. This work left him free during the summer to pursue his literary work.

In 1918, Lambert married Kate Elinor Klein, a talented artist and wood engraver who signed herself Elinor Lambert. They established The Stanton Press together in 1921, producing fine, hand-printed volumes of poetry and translation. The press closed in 1924 when Lambert took up a full-time post as a tutor for the University of London.

In 1927, he joined the BBC as Head of the Adult Education Section and, in 1928, he became the first editor of The Listener magazine. At this time the magazine was intended primarily to disseminate talks delivered by the BBC. Under Lambert's editorship notable contributors to The Listener included members of the Bloomsbury Group Paul Nash, Roger Fry and Clive Bell.

In April 1939, R.S. Lambert resigned from the BBC and migrated to Canada with his family. There he joined CBC Radio, being named educational advisor in 1940. His collections of wartime broadcasts for CBC were published in several volumes.

In 1944, he divorced Kate Elinor Lambert and married Joyce Morgan.

From 1943 to 1959 he served CBC as Supervisor of School Broadcasts, retiring in 1963 to live in a neo-Gothic rectory called Claverleigh at Creemore (now called Clearview, Ontario). Always a prolific author, he continued to write books in his retirement about the history of Canada and Canadian folklore and legend. He died on 27 November 1981 at the Royal Jubilee Hospital, Victoria, British Columbia, Canada. In 1990, Claverleigh was designated a National Historic Site of Canada.

== Paranormal interests ==
Lambert was interested in the supernatural as a hobby throughout his life and wrote two books on the subject. The first, published in 1935, was entitled The Haunting of Cashen's Gap. The second book, entitled Exploring the Supernatural, was the first significant study of supernatural occurrences in Canada.

The first book was about the phenomenon of Gef the talking mongoose. The mongoose was said to be haunting an isolated farmhouse on the Isle of Man. Lambert accompanied his friend, paranormal investigator Harry Price and together they wrote the book. Lambert's apparent credulity about the talking mongoose led Sir Cecil Levita to criticise him, suggesting that he was unfit to serve on the Board of the British Film Institute, of which Lambert was one of the founders and a prominent Governor in the 1930s. Levita said that Lambert was "off his head" because he had believed in the talking mongoose and the evil eye. Lambert sued Levita for slander. Lambert was pressured to abandon his action by Sir Stephen Tallents but persisted with it and won, receiving £7,600 in damages, then an exceptional figure for a slander case, awarded because Lambert's counsel managed to introduce a BBC memo which showed Lambert's career had been threatened if he persisted with the case. The case became known as "The Mongoose Case".

The case achieved wide media coverage in the popular press of the day. It had important repercussions for Lambert's employer, the BBC, as well as for the British Film Institute.

== Published books ==
- The Game of Chess / done into English from the Latin of Marco Girolamo Vida & printed by Richard Stanton Lambert: & introduced by Richard C. Lambert: & decorated with woodcuts by Nell Lambert. 1921 (London: Stanton).
- Ode to Sleep by Papinius Statius, Translated from the Latin into English Verse by Richard Stanton Lambert, 1923 (Wembley Hill, Middlesex: The Stanton Press)
- Modern Imperialism , 1928 (Longmans, Workers’ Educational Association)
- The Prince of Pickpockets: a study of George Barrington, who left his country for his country’s good , 1930 (Faber and Faber)
- The Youth of Industrialism: Six broadcast Dialogues between H.L. Beales and R.S. Lambert , 1930 (British Broadcasting Corporation, London)
- A Historian’s Scrapbook: a picture gallery of life during the nineteenth century , 1932 (British Institute of Adult Education)
- The Dorsetshire Labourers: a play in two acts, adapted from the radio version by W E Williams , 1934 (Workers’ Educational Association)
- Memoirs of the Unemployed, written in collaboration with H.L. Beales , 1934 (Victor Gollancz, London)
- For Filmgoers Only: The Intelligent Filmgoer's Guide to the Film , 1934 (British Institute of Adult Education and Faber & Faber)
- The Railway King, 1800–1871: a study of George Hudson and the business morals of his time , 1934 (Allen and Unwin, London)
- When Justice Faltered: a study of nine peculiar murder trials , 1935 (Methuen)
- Grand Tour; a journey in the tracks of the age of aristocracy , 1935 (Faber & Faber)
- The Haunting of Cashen's Gap: A Modern "Miracle" Investigated, written in collaboration with H. Price, 1935 (Methuen & Co. Ltd.)
- The Innocence of Edmund Galley , 1936 (Newnes)
- Art in England , 1938 (Penguin)
- Propaganda , 1938 (Thomas Nelson And Sons. Ltd., London)
- The Universal Provider: A Study of William Whiteley and the Rise of the London Department Store , 1938 (Harrap)
- The Cobbett of the West: a study of Thomas Latimer and the struggle between pulpit and press at Exeter , 1938 (Nicholson and Watson)
- Ariel and All His Quality: An Impression of the BBC from Within , 1938 (Victor Gollancz, London)
- Home front: intimate letters, both grave and gay, telling how Great Britain faces the war , 1940 (The Ryerson Press, Toronto)
- Mind Under Fire; The March of Propaganda in Wartime , 1940 (Canadian Association for Adult Education, Toronto)
- Films in School , 1940 (Shell Oil Company of Canada)
- Old Country Mail: A Selection from the CBC Broadcasts , 1941 (The Canadian Broadcasting Corporation, Toronto)
- How healthy is Canada? , 1941 (Canadian Association for Adult Education and the Canadian Institute for International Affairs, Toronto)
- For the time is at hand: an account of the prophesies of Henry Wentworth Monk of Ottawa, friend of the Jews, and pioneer of world peace , 1947 (London)
- The adventure of Canadian painting , 1947 (McClelland and Stewart)
- Franklin of the Arctic; a life of adventure , 1949 (McClelland and Stewart)
- The Fortunate Traveller: a short history of touring and travel for pleasure , 1950 (Melrose)
- Adventure to The Polar Sea: the story of Sir John Franklin , 1950 (Bobbs-Merrill)
- North for Adventure , 1952 (McClelland and Stewart)
- They Went Exploring , 1954 (The Book Society of Canada Ltd.)
- Exploring the Supernatural: The Weird in Canadian Folklore , 1955 (Arthur Baker; McClelland & Stewart)
- The world's most daring explorers: 38 men who opened up the world , 1956 (Sterling Publishing Co., New York)
- Redcoat Sailor: The Adventures of Sir Howard Douglas , 1956 (Macmillan, Toronto)
- Trailmaker: the story of Alexander Mackenzie , 1957 (McClelland and Stewart, Toronto)
- We Live in Ontario , 1957 (Book Society of Canada)
- The Great Heritage , 1958 (House of Grant).
- The Twentieth Century: Britain, Canada, USA , 1963 (The House of Grant Ltd)
- School Broadcasting in Canada , 1963 (University of Toronto Press)
- Canadian Neighbour , 1965 (Queen’s Printer, Ottawa)
- Mutiny in the Bay: Henry Hudson's Last Voyage , 1966 (Macmillan, Toronto)
- Myths, Legends and Fables , 1967 (Book Society of Canada).
- Renewing Nature's Wealth: A Centennial History of the Public Management of Lands, Forests, and Wildlife in Ontario 1763–1967 , 1967 (The Hunter Rose Co. and Ontario Department of Lands and Forests)
- The Stanton Press: a retrospect , 1971 (article in The Private Library)
- The Gothic Rectory at the Mad River Forks, Creemore, Ontario: The Story of Claverleigh and Its People , 1971 (Private printing by the author)

== In popular media ==
Lambert is portrayed by Emilio Calcioli in the 2023 feature film Nandor Fodor and the Talking Mongoose.
