= Apport (paranormal) =

Paranormal transference

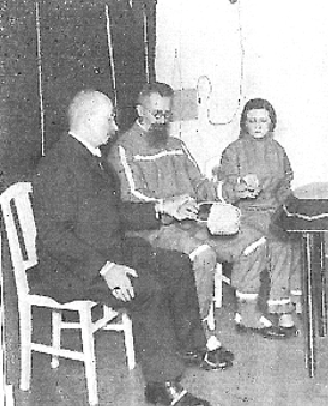
Lajos Pap (middle), fraudulent apport medium.

In parapsychology and Spiritualism, an apport is the alleged paranormal transference of an article from one place to another, or an appearance of an article from an unknown source that is often associated with poltergeist activity or séances. Apports reported during séances have been found to be the result of deliberate fraud. No medium or psychic has demonstrated the manifestation of an apport under scientifically controlled conditions.

== History ==
A famous apport fraud is attributed to Charles Bailey (1870–1947). During a séance, Bailey produced two live birds seemingly out of thin air, but was undone when the dealer who sold him the birds appeared in the crowd. Common objects that are produced are stones, flowers, perfumes, and animals. These objects are said to be "gifts" from the spirit(s).

In March 1902 in Berlin, police officers interrupted a séance of the apport medium Frau Anna Rothe. Her hands were grabbed and she was wrestled to the ground. A female police assistant physically examined Rothe and discovered 157 flowers as well as oranges and lemons hidden in her petticoat. She was arrested and charged with fraud. After a trial lasting six days she was sentenced to eighteen months' imprisonment.

In 1926, Heinrich Melzer was exposed as a fraud as he was caught in the séance room with small stones attached to the back of his ears by flesh coloured tape. According to neurologist Terence Hines "Some female mediums went so far as to conceal in their vagina or anus objects to be 'apported' during the seance and gauzy fabric that would become 'ectoplasm' during the seance. These were places that Victorian gentlemen, no matter how skeptical, were highly unlikely to ask to search."

There are many cases where apports have been smuggled into the séance room. Other apport mediums that were exposed as frauds were Lajos Pap and Maria Silbert.

== See also ==
- Evocation
- Indriði Indriðason
- List of topics characterized as pseudoscience
- Materialization
- Psychokinesis
- Sleight of hand
- Teleportation
