= The Listener (magazine) =

Weekly magazine established by the BBC

- Categories: Culture
- Frequency: Weekly
- First issue: 16 January 1929
- Final issue: 3 January 1991
- Company: BBC Magazines
- Country: United Kingdom
- Based in: London
- Language: English
- ISSN: 0024-4392

The Listener was a weekly magazine established by the BBC in January 1929 which ceased publication in 1991. The entire digitised archive was made available for purchase online to libraries, educational and research institutions in 2011.

It was first published on 16 January 1929, under the editorship of Richard S. Lambert, and was developed as a medium of record for the reproduction of broadcast talks. It also previewed major literary and musical broadcasts, reviewed new books, and printed a selected list of the more intellectual broadcasts for the coming week.

Its published aim was to be "a medium for intelligent reception of broadcast programmes by way of amplification and explanation of those features which cannot now be dealt with in the editorial columns of the Radio Times". The title reflected the fact that at the time the BBC broadcast via radio only.

(The BBC version of The Listener was preceded by another magazine with the same title which was the Journal of the Wireless League.)

The first issue was published as a four-page insert in the Wireless World magazine on 24 March 1926. The Listener was described as The Journal of the Wireless League and was edited by Prof. A. M. Low. A comment from the BBC was included: "The B.B.C. welcomes The Listener. We have always before us the need for constant progress and we gladly listen to constructive criticism and help from the large body of listeners you represent. The Listener should be a milestone in the advance of British Broadcasting."

== History ==
The Newspaper Proprietors' Association considered its launch to be "an illegitimate stretching of official activity" and, after consultation between Reith and the Prime Minister, a number of compromises were agreed to, including an upper limit of 10% original contributed material not related to broadcasting. Another compromise was a limit to the amount of advertising it could carry.

It came to be seen as one of a trio of weekly magazines, the other two being The Spectator and the New Statesman, though it was distinguished from them by not being associated with a political party. The management of the other two magazines were occasionally critical of what they saw as the privileged financial position of their subsidised rival.

Above all, The Listener represented the BBC's cultural mission (strongly emphasised by John Reith). It gradually declined after 1960 as British society changed, the BBC became more plural, and other sources of information became more readily available.

The first editor, Richard S. Lambert, left in 1939 after successfully suing Sir Cecil Levita for slander over allegations that he was unfit for his job because of his credulity in believing in Gef, the talking mongoose.

=== 1980s & early 1990s ===
Following the report of the Peacock Committee in 1986, all the BBC’s commercial activities, including The Listener, were moved into BBC Enterprises Limited. Management was now mainly answerable for the magazine’s commercial performance rather than its literary standards.

In 1987 The Listener was spun out to a new company jointly owned by the BBC and rival broadcaster ITV. Seeing The Listener’s eclecticism as a lack of focus, the new company appointed Alan Coren from Punch as editor in 1987 to try to establish a clearer identity as a humorous weekly, moving slightly away from the more intellectual and artistic aspects for which the magazine had also been known.

The attempt did not work, perhaps because the change of direction alienated subscribers who had valued the eclecticism, and the company replaced Coren with Peter Fiddick in 1989. In 1990 ITV pulled out of the joint deal, the BBC found itself unable to support it on its own, and the last issue of The Listener was published on 3 January 1991.

=== 2010s ===
In 2011 the magazines were scanned for digitally preserved archiving. Issues are available via the educational publisher Gale, behind a paywall. Online access can be obtained from publishers Gale.com. Cost of access to the archive starts at 760 pounds sterling for an annual subscription, as of 2022.

== Contributors ==
In its early decades The Listener attracted celebrated contributors including H. E. Bates, E. M. Forster, T. S. Eliot, Julian Huxley, George Orwell, Bertrand Russell, George Bernard Shaw, Rose Macaulay, Virginia Woolf, G. K. Chesterton, Herbert Read, Hans Keller and John Kenneth Galbraith. It also provided an important platform for new writers and poets. W. H. Auden, Edwin Muir, Christopher Isherwood, Stephen Spender, Sylvia Plath and Philip Larkin all had early works published in The Listener. Later, regular columnists included John Cole, Stephen Fry and Roy Hattersley. Barry Fantoni provided the magazine with cartoons and illustrations for twenty-one years.

== Crossword ==
The Listener crossword puzzle, introduced in 1930, is generally regarded as the most difficult cryptic crossword to appear in a national weekly. It survived the closure of The Listener and now appears in The Times on a Saturday, along with other puzzles and game articles on the last four pages of the "Saturday Review" section.

Solvers are invited to send in their solutions, with each of three randomly drawn correct solutions winning a prize of a book provided by the sponsors, Chambers. An annual list of statistics is also compiled for regular solvers to compare their performances. In most years only a handful of solvers are able to complete and submit all 52 puzzles correctly. The leading solver each year is awarded the Solver Silver Salver, and the all-correct solvers vote for the best puzzle of the year — the setter of which is awarded the Ascot Gold Cup.

== Editors ==
- Richard S. Lambert 1929–1939
- Alan Thomas
- Maurice Percy Ashley, 1958–1967
- Karl Miller, 1967–1973
- George Edwin Scott, 1974–1979
- Anthony Howard, 1979–1981
- Russell Twisk, 1981–1987
- Alan Coren 1987–1989
- Peter Fiddick, 1989–1991

Arts and literary editors included J. R. Ackerley 1935–1959, and Anthony Thwaite. Assistant Editors included Janet Adam Smith 1930–1935.
