= Arthur Findlay College =

Coordinates: 51.89692°N 0.21247°E

- Stansted Mountfitchet, Essex; England

Information
- Type: College of Spiritualism and psychic sciences

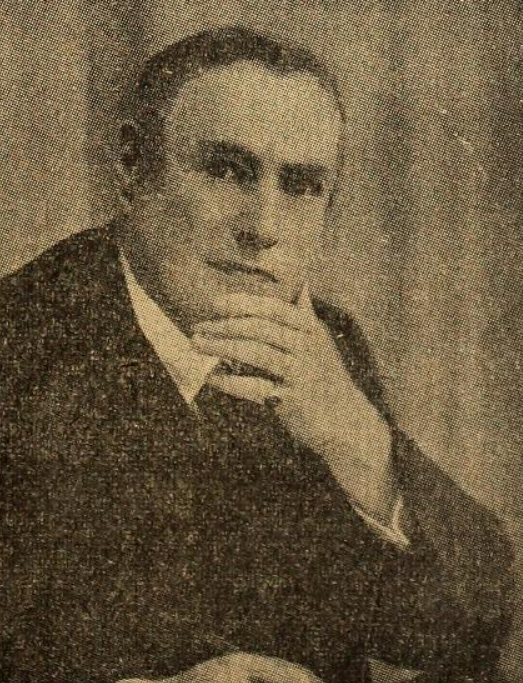
Arthur Findlay

Arthur Findlay College is a college of Spiritualism and psychic sciences at Stansted Hall in Stansted Mountfitchet, Essex, England.

Stansted Hall was built in 1871, and the college was founded there in 1964. In accordance with Arthur Findlay's wishes, the college building and grounds are administered by the Spiritualists' National Union (SNU). The head offices of SNU at Redwoods are within the college grounds.

== History of Stansted Hall ==
Stansted Hall, built in 1871, was given to the Spiritualists' National Union in by J. Arthur Findlay, MBE, JP, a former honorary president of the SNU, and in accordance with his wishes is administered by the Union as a college for the advancement of psychic science.

Findlay bought the estate in 1923 upon his retirement from business and first mooted the idea of a spiritualist college at Stansted to the union in 1945. After personal contacts with three successive SNU presidents, a will was drawn up, and in 1954 the National Council accepted the proposed bequest of Stansted Hall with an endowment. This was followed by a later gift in the form of stock to be used for furnishing and decorating, and in 1964, a year after the death of his wife, Findlay transferred the hall, grounds and endowment to the union. Findlay died in July 1964.

== Description ==
The internal arrangements include the library (with a portrait of Gordon Higginson), the lecture room, the Britten Memorial Museum and several other rooms for general use, as well as facilities for guest accommodation.

The college's teaching includes mediumship, spiritualist healing, meditation, spiritual development, working with sound and colour, philosophy, psychic art and auragraphs, and trance.

== Alumnus ==
- John Holland
