= International Institute for Psychical Research =

The International Institute for Psychical Research (IIPR) was a short-lived psychical organization based in London that was formed in 1934. It was criticized by scientists for its spiritualist leanings and non-scientific approach to the subject.

== History ==
A predecessor to the International Institute for Psychical Research was the Survival League founded in 1929 by Catherine Amy Dawson Scott and Shaw Desmond. After the Survival League dissolved, Desmond, Shaw and Arthur Findlay founded the International Institute for Psychical Research in 1934. The institute attracted scientists such as its first President Grafton Elliot Smith and Vice-Presidents Julian Huxley and Ernest MacBride although they resigned after a few months as the lack of scientific method and the spiritualist leanings of the institute became clear.

Arthur Findlay was Chairman and D. F. Fraser-Harris was Research Officer. Fraser-Harris, Huxley, MacBride, Smith and other members such as Ernest Bennett and William Brown had resigned by June, 1934. Huxley described the institute as "not very scientific". Smith stated that he resigned because the institute was meant to have set up a scientific laboratory to investigate claims of psychical phenomena but it was never built. Findlay a spiritualist was criticized for his non-scientific approach to the subject. A review in the Nature journal noted that he had "little conception of the critical attitude of science towards the evidence which he presents and the explanations he gives of the phenomena he describes."

Nandor Fodor replaced Fraser-Harris as Research Officer, a position he held until 1938.

In December, 1938 the institute merged with the British College of Psychic Science becoming the Institute for Experimental Metaphysics. It changed name in January 1939, to the International Institute for Psychic Investigation (IIPI). The famed novelist and poet Hilda Doolittle joined the IIPI in 1941. Occult writer Ralph Shirley was Vice President of the IIPI. Its librarian was palmist Beryl Butterworth Hutchinson. The institute struggled during World War II and its library and records were destroyed by bombing raids. By 1947 the institute had collapsed.

== Investigations ==
The International Institute for Psychical Research utilized a séance room for testing spiritualist mediums.

In 1935, Lajos Pap a medium famous for producing apports was investigated by Nandor Fodor. He reported that the phenomena were fraudulent and not evidence for the paranormal. During the séance a dead snake appeared. Pap was searched and was found to be wearing a device under his robe, where he had hidden the snake.

Icelandic medium Ingibjorg Lara Agustsdottir was tested in October, 1937. The results were negative, the phenomenon was "both fraudulent and farcical".

== Publications ==
- Hereward Carrington. (1936). Historic Poltergeists. International Institute for Psychical Research. Bulletin I.
- Nandor Fodor. (1936). The Lajos Pap Experiments. International Institute for Psychical Research. Bulletin II.
- B. J. Hopper. (1936). Enquiry into the Cloud-Chamber Method of Studying the "Intra-atomic Quality". International Institute for Psychical Research. Bulletin III.
- Erik Palmstierna. (1938). Horizons of Immortality and the Subconscious Mind. International Institute for Psychical Research. Bulletin IV.
- Ernesto Bozzano. (1938). Discarnate Influence in Human Life: A Review of the Case for Spirit Intervention. Library of the International Institute for Psychical Research. Volume I.

The International Institute for Psychic Investigation published the quarterly journal Psychic Science. During 1945-1947 it became the Experimental Metaphysics.

== Notable members ==
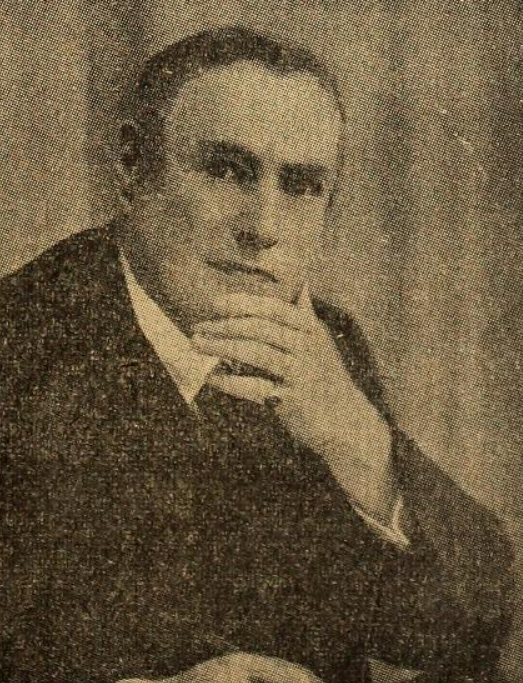
Arthur Findlay, founding member

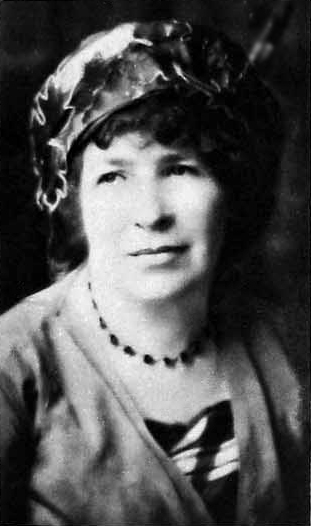
Catherine Amy Dawson Scott, founding member

== See also ==
- Society for Psychical Research
