= The Stanton Press =

The Stanton Press was set up in 1921 by Richard S. Lambert (1894–1981) and his wife Elinor Lambert (1892-?) at 32 Chalfont Avenue, Wembley Hill, Middlesex where they lived. Richard Lambert's interest in printing was fired by his enthusiasm for the hand-printed books of private presses such as William Morris' Kelmscott Press, Essex House Press, Eragny Press, Vale Press and Ashendene Press which had flourished before the First World War.

The books produced by The Stanton Press are all illustrated or decorated and feature titles of new or translated poetry. Richard S. Lambert translated the poetry into English from Latin. Elinor Lambert was an artist whose woodcut engravings feature in some of the books produced by the press. Agnes Lambert also illustrated some of the books. The British Museum holds several examples of prints by Elinor Lambert.

The press produced a total of eight titles, closing in 1924.

== List of books produced ==
- The Game of Chess by Mark Jerome Vida (1921); Latin text by Marco Girolamo Vida facing English hexameter translation by R.S. Lambert. Introduction by R.C. Lambert. Wood-engravings by Elinor Lambert. 250 copies.
- Orchestra, or A Poeme of Dauncing by Sir John Davies (1922); Poem originally published in 1596. Wood-engravings by Elinor Lambert. 175 copies.
- Abraham by Roswitha, the Nun of Gandersheim - (1922); Translated from the Latin into English by R.S. Lambert. Four line drawings by Agnes Lambert. 100 copies. Roswitha of Gandersheim lived in the 10th Century and was the first female poet of the Middle Ages and the first person since antiquity to write dramas. She became abbess of the Benedictine Gandersheim Abbey in Saxony.
- Callimachus by Roswitha, the Nun of Gandersheim - (1923); Translated from the Latin into English by R.S. Lambert. Five line drawings by Agnes Lambert. 75 copies.
- Ode to Sleep by Statius (1923); Latin text facing English translation by R. S. Lambert. Title page decoration by Elinor Lambert. 90 copies.
- The History of Susanna Taken out of the Apocrypha (1923); Borders and two illustrations by Agnes Lambert engraved on wood by Elinor Lambert. 100 copies on handmade paper. 8 copies on Japanese vellum.
- Hortulus, or The Little Garden by Walafrid Strabo (1924), Translated from the Latin into English by R.S. Lambert. Title-page and 34 vignettes engraved on wood by Elinor Lambert. 125 copies on handmade paper. 7 copies on Japanese vellum.
- The Sirens: An Ode by Laurence Binyon (1924); Title page border engraved by Elinor Lambert. 200 copies on Kelmscott handmade paper. 5 copies on vellum.
