= Nandor Fodor and the Talking Mongoose =

2023 film by Adam Sigal

- Theatrical release poster
- Directed by: Adam Sigal
- Written by: Adam Sigal
- Produced by: Sasha Yelaun; Karl Hall; Dominic Burns; Jack Christian; Robert Paschall Jr.
- Starring: Simon Pegg; Minnie Driver; Christopher Lloyd; Neil Gaiman
- Cinematography: Sara Deane
- Edited by: David E. Freeman
- Music by: Bill Prokopow
- Production companies: Filmology Finance; Phantasm Films; Legion M
- Distributed by: Saban Films
- Release date: 1 September 2023 (United States)
- Running time: 96 minutes
- Country: United Kingdom
- Language: English
- Box office: $9,309

Nandor Fodor and the Talking Mongoose is a 2023 British black comedy film written and directed by Adam Sigal and starring Simon Pegg, Minnie Driver and Christopher Lloyd and featuring the voice of Neil Gaiman. It is based on the legend of Gef the talking mongoose, a story given extensive coverage by the tabloid press in Britain in the early 1930s.

Nandor Fodor and the Talking Mongoose had its limited theatrical release in the United States on 1 September 2023. The film received mixed reviews from critics.

== Plot ==
Renowned parapsychologist Nandor Fodor travels to Isle of Man with his assistant Anne to investigate the case of Gef, the talking mongoose, believed to live at or around the farmstead of James Irving, local wealthy merchant. The mongoose has been reported by several people to be heard speaking to them, prophesying about future events, reciting poems, and even making telephone calls; although one report of hearing Gef's voice took place in the presence of Irving's daughter Voirrey, who is known to be a skilled ventriloquist. Most of the local residents believe firmly in Gef's actual existence, although sightings of the mongoose are much rarer than ear-witness reports, and those are invariably cursory glimpses of some furry creature "out of the corner of the eye" for a split second.

Fodor becomes increasingly sceptical, especially after Irving's farmhand Errol says in conversation with him that "there's no Gef". Late at night, Fodor receives a phone call from Gef, who repeats to him the last words Fodor's father told him when he was leaving Hungary ("I shall never see you again"), and then announces that he will make an appearance for Fodor tomorrow. At a viewing organised the next day by Irving in his barn, a tuft of brownish fur is seen briefly under a wooden box. Fodor accuses Errol of complicity in perpetuation of deception by the Irvings, Errol retorts that "everybody wants to be happy" and perhaps Fodor would be happy if he "let people believe what they want to believe." Later in the evening Fodor gets drunk and forces his way violently into the barn where Gef made his appearance; Errol knocks him on the head with the butt of his gun and he comes to in a cell at the police station. Fodor's demand to be allowed to make a phone call to arrange his release is left unheeded, and he hears Gef's sneering and taunting voice. Fodor demands to know how Gef has come to know his father's last words to him, and Gef replies, "What if there is nothing after this, no Heaven, no Hell, just nothing? No awareness of the fact that we were ever aware at all?" Fodor then begs Gef to prove that he is real, or at least to scratch his outstretched hand on the wrist with claws - Gef's "little scratch" leaves three deep and painful gashes across his wrist; he bursts into tears and thanks Gef. On their way to London, Anne asks Fodor at least to accept the possibility of Gef's existence.

In London, Fodor renounces drinking, announces his intention to write an article about Gef and events on the Irvings' farm which will be truthful, yet without undue harshness - Gef's words have imbued him with everybody's needing to be remembered. He is last seen standing at his father's grave.

Photos from the 1936 book The Haunting of Cashen's Gap: A Modern "Miracle" Investigated by Harry Price and Richard S. Lambert are shown alongside the closing credits, followed by onscreen caption "Producers, cast, and crew wish to thank members (and mongooses) of Gef's army. However there is one person that we would not like to thank...". The film ends with "a special message from the cast" as a post-credits scene in which all major performers (Connell, Downie, Beadle, Kaye, Lloyd, Pegg) join in verbally bashing the film's director Adam Sigal, and with the final caption "Adam, in all seriousness... you suck"; however, in the version streamed by Amazon Prime (in the UK in December 2025) there is no such "special message from the cast" or verbal bashing of the director.

== Cast ==
- Simon Pegg as Nandor Fodor
- Minnie Driver as Anne
- Christopher Lloyd as Harry Price
- Neil Gaiman as the voice of Gef
- Edmund Kingsley as Harry Houdini
- Tim Downie as Mr. Irving
- Ruth Connell as Mrs. Irving
- Jessica Balmer as Voirrey Irving
- Paul Kaye as Maurice
- Gary Beadle as Errol
- Drew Moerlin as Thomas Wright

== Production ==
The film was produced by Dominic Burns, Jack Christian, Karl Hall and Sasha Yelaun.

In May 2022, it was reported that Simon Pegg and Minnie Driver were cast in the film and that principal photography began in Leeds and Whitby. Later that month, it was reported that Christopher Lloyd was added to the cast. In December 2022, it was announced that Neil Gaiman would voice Gef.

== Release ==
The film was released in limited cinemas in the United States on 1 September 2023. It was released on Amazon Prime Video in the United Kingdom in late 2023.

== Critical response ==
On the review aggregator website Rotten Tomatoes, 46% of 35 critics' reviews are positive, with an average rating of 5.2/10. Metacritic, which uses a weighted average, assigned the film a score of 54 out of 100, based on 5 critics, indicating "mixed or average" reviews.

Dennis Harvey of Variety gave a negative review writing, "Any movie about a talking-mongoose-related historical incident should offer a bonanza of strangeness, at the very least. But this nice-looking, low-key, talky little film seems hesitant to embrace that or any other quality".
