= John Holland (psychic) =

American artist, author, public speaker and psychic medium

John Holland is an American artist, author, and public speaker, who describes himself as a psychic medium.

== Early life ==
John Holland was born into an East Coast, Irish-Italian/Roman Catholic home. One of his parents suffered from alcoholism. He claims to have had psychic abilities since childhood, although he says they were suppressed until he had a near-death-experience in a car accident.

== Work ==
He attended the Arthur Findlay College for psychics and mediums in England. He was the host of the History Channel show Psychic History. This show ran for two episodes and was not picked up by the History Channel for further development.

Holland currently hosts Spirit Connections with John Holland, a web-based show on Hay House Radio. Holland's show airs Mondays 3-4 PM EST. He has been an "active" working psychic medium for over 20 years.

Holland is also a contributor for the metaphysical website InfiniteQuest.com. and the author of several oracle card decks including The Spirit Messages Daily Guidance Oracle Deck, The Psychic Tarot for the Heart Oracle Deck and The Psychic Tarot Oracle Deck.

== Bibliography ==
- Born Knowing: A Medium's Journey—Accepting and Embracing My Spiritual Gifts (2003) ISBN 1-4019-0082-8
- Psychic Navigator: Harnessing Your Inner Guidance (2004) ISBN 1-4019-0242-1
- 101 Ways to Jump-Start Your Intuition (2005) ISBN 1-4019-0619-2
- Power of the Soul: Inside Wisdom for an Outside World (2007) ISBN 978-1-4019-1085-3
- The Spirit Whisperer: Chronicles of a Medium (2010) ISBN 978-1401922870
