= National Laboratory of Psychical Research =

Coordinates: 51.49010°N 0.18073°W

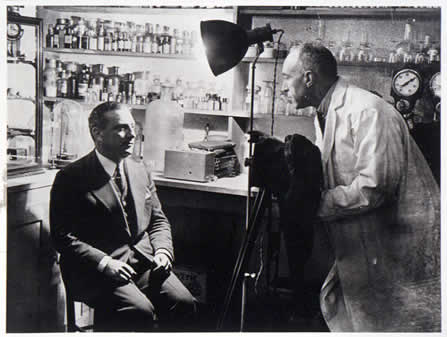
Harry Price testing the medium Pasquale Erto at the laboratory in 1931 – the "Luminous Man" from Naples was exposed as a fraud.

The National Laboratory of Psychical Research was established in 1926 by Harry Price, at 16 Queensberry Place, London. Its aim was "to investigate in a dispassionate manner and by purely scientific means every phase of psychic or alleged psychic phenomena". The honorary president was Lord Sands, K.C., LL.D., acting president was H. G. Bois, and the honorary director was Harry Price. In 1930 the Laboratory moved from Queensberry Square, where it had been a tenant of the London Spiritualist Alliance to 13 Roland Gardens. In 1938, its library was transferred on loan to the University of London.

The National Laboratory of Psychical Research was a rival to the Society for Psychical Research. Price had a number of disputes with the SPR, most notably over the mediumship of Rudi Schneider. Price paid mediums to test them, the SPR criticised Price and disagreed about paying mediums for testing.

In 1934 the Laboratory was replaced by the University of London Council for Psychical Investigation (not an official body of the University) under the Chairmanship of C. E. M. Joad with Harry Price as Hon. Secretary. John Flügel, Cyril Burt, Cecil Alec Mace and Francis Aveling were members of the Council. Price suspended the operations of the Council in 1938. It was never revived.

== Publications ==
- British Journal for Psychical Research, Bimonthly, discontinued in 1929
- Proceedings of the National Laboratory of Psychical Research, volume I, discontinued in 1929
- Bulletins of the National Laboratory of Psychical Research:
  - I. Regurgitation and the Duncan Mediumship, by Harry Price, 1932
  - II. Fraudulent Mediums, an essay by Prof. D. F. Fraser-Harris, repr. from Science Progress, January 1932
  - III. The Identification of the "Walter" Prints, by E. E. Dudley, 1933
  - IV. An Account of Some Further Experiments with Rudi Schneider, by Harry Price, 1933
  - V. Schneider: The Vienna Experiments of Professors Meyer and Przibram, by Stefan Meyer and Karl Przibram, 1933

== Investigations ==
=== Eileen Garrett ===
On October 7, 1930 it was claimed by spiritualists that Eileen J. Garrett made contact with the spirit of Herbert Carmichael Irwin at a séance held with Price at the National Laboratory of Psychical Research two days after the R101 disaster, while attempting to contact the then recently deceased Arthur Conan Doyle, and discussed possible causes of the accident. The event "attracted worldwide attention", thanks to the presence of a reporter. Major Oliver Villiers, a friend of Brancker, Scott, Irwin, Colmore and others aboard the airship, participated in further séances with Garrett, at which he claimed to have contacted both Irwin and other victims. Price did not come to any definite conclusion about Garrett and the séances:

It is not my intention to discuss if the medium were really controlled by the discarnate entity of Irwin, or whether the utterances emanated from her subconscious mind or those of the sitters. "Spirit" or "trance personality" would be equally interesting explanations - and equally remarkable. There is no real evidence for either hypothesis. But it is not my intention to discuss hypotheses, but rather to put on record the detailed account of a remarkably interesting and thought-provoking experiment.

Garrett's claims have since been questioned. The magician John Booth analysed the mediumship of Garrett and the paranormal claims of R101 and considered her to be a fraud. According to Booth, Garrett's notes and writings show she followed the building of the R101 and she may have been given aircraft blueprints from a technician from the airdrome. However, the researcher Melvin Harris who studied the case wrote no secret accomplice was needed as the information described in Garrett's séances were "either commonplace, easily absorbed bits and pieces, or plain gobbledegook. The so-called secret information just doesn't exist."

=== Helen Duncan ===
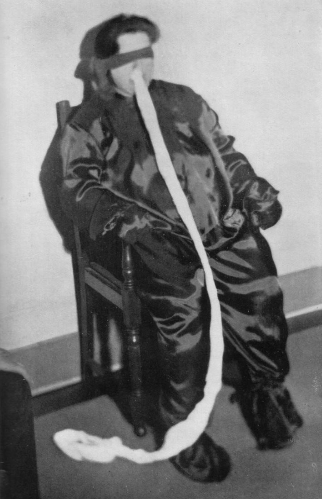
Helen Duncan with a roll of cheesecloth.

In 1931, the National Laboratory of Psychical Research took on its most illustrious case. £50 was paid to the medium Helen Duncan so that she could be examined under scientific conditions. Price was sceptical of Duncan and had her perform a number of test séances. She was suspected of swallowing cheesecloth which was then regurgitated as "ectoplasm". Price had proven through analysis of a sample of ectoplasm produced by Duncan, that it was made of cheesecloth. Duncan reacted violently at attempts to X-ray her, running from the laboratory and making a scene in the street, where her husband had to restrain her, destroying the controlled nature of the test. Price wrote that Duncan had given her fake ectoplasm to her husband to hide. The ectoplasm of Duncan in another test was analysed by psychical researchers to be made from egg white. According to Price:

The sight of half-a-dozen men, each with a pair of scissors waiting for the word, was amusing. It came and we all jumped. One of the doctors got hold of the stuff and secured a piece. The medium screamed and the rest of the "teleplasm" went down her throat. This time it wasn't cheese-cloth. It proved to be paper, soaked in white of egg, and folded into a flattened tube... Could anything be more infantile than a group of grown-up men wasting time, money, and energy on the antics of a fat female crook.

Price wrote up the case in Leaves from a Psychist's Case Book (1933) in a chapter called "The Cheese-Cloth Worshippers". Price in his report published photographs of Duncan in his laboratory that revealed fake ectoplasm made from cheesecloth, rubber gloves and cut-out heads from magazine covers which she pretended to her audience were spirits. Following the report written by Price, Duncan's former maid Mary McGinlay confessed in detail to having aided Duncan in her mediumship tricks, and Duncan's husband admitted that the ectoplasm materialisations to be the result of regurgitation. Later Duncan was caught cheating again pretending to be a spirit in the séance room. During Duncan's famous trial in 1944, Price gave his results as evidence for the prosecution. This time Duncan and her travelling companions, Frances Brown, Ernest and Elizabeth Homer were prosecuted and convicted. Duncan was jailed for nine months, Brown for four months and the Homers were bound over.

=== Rudi Schneider ===
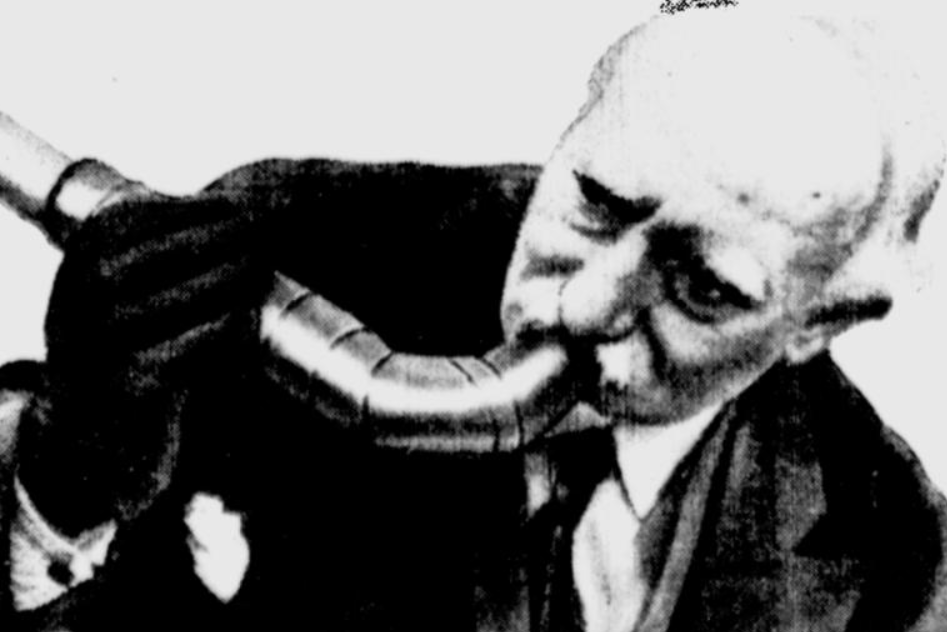
Frederick Tansley Munnings with trumpet.

In 1920s and early 1930s Price investigated the medium Rudi Schneider in a number of experiments conducted at the National Laboratory of Psychical Research. Rudi claimed he could levitate objects but according to Price a photograph taken on April 28, 1932 showed that Rudi had managed to free his arm to move a handkerchief from the table. After this, many scientists considered Rudi to be exposed as a fraud. Price wrote that the findings of the other experiments should be revised due to the evidence showing how Rudi could free himself from the controls.

After Price had exposed Rudi, various scientists such Karl Przibram and the magician Henry Evans wrote to Price telling him that they agreed that Rudi would evade control during his séances and congratulated Price on the success of unmasking the fraud. In opposition, SPR members who were highly critical of Price, supported Rudi's mediumship and promoted a conspiracy theory that Price had hoaxed the photograph. SPR member Anita Gregory suggested that Price had deliberately faked the photograph to discredit SPR research and ruin Rudi's reputation. However, a photographic expert testified that the photograph was genuine. SPR member John L. Randall reviewed the Price and Schneider case and came to the conclusion the photograph was genuine, Price had caught Rudi in fraud.

=== Others ===
Price tested the trumpet medium Frederick Tansley Munnings at the laboratory who claimed to produce the independent "spirit" voices of Julius Caesar, Dan Leno, Hawley Harvey Crippen and King Henry VIII. Price invented and used a piece of apparatus known as a voice control recorder and proved that all the voices were those of Munnings. In 1928, Munnings admitted fraud and sold his confessions to a Sunday newspaper. Price also investigated the Italian chemist and medium Pasquale Erto in 1931. During the séances he utilised his knowledge of chemistry to produce luminous light effects. Traces of ferrocerium were discovered and Price concluded the phenomena were produced fraudulently.

In 1933, Frank Decker was investigated by Price at the laboratory. Under strict scientific controls that Price contrived, Decker failed to produce any phenomena at all.

== Gallery ==
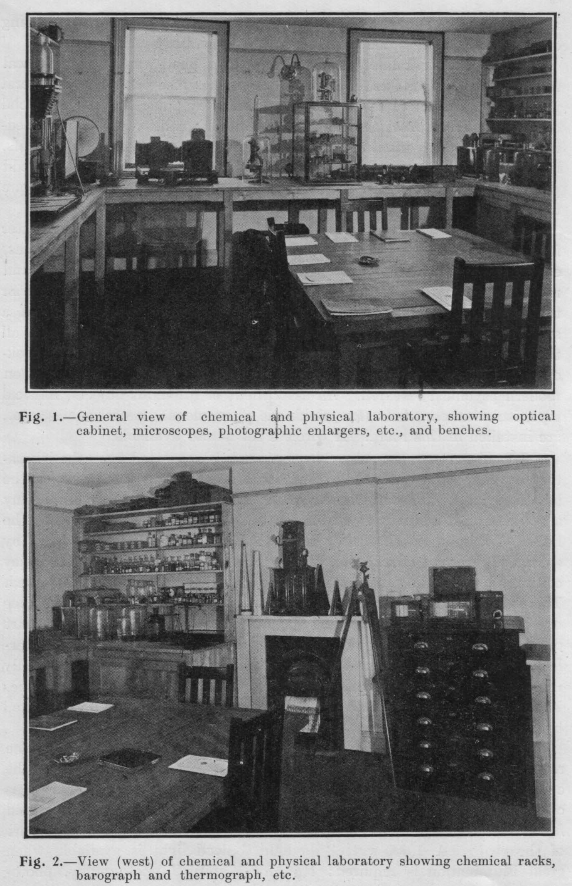
Photographs of the laboratory

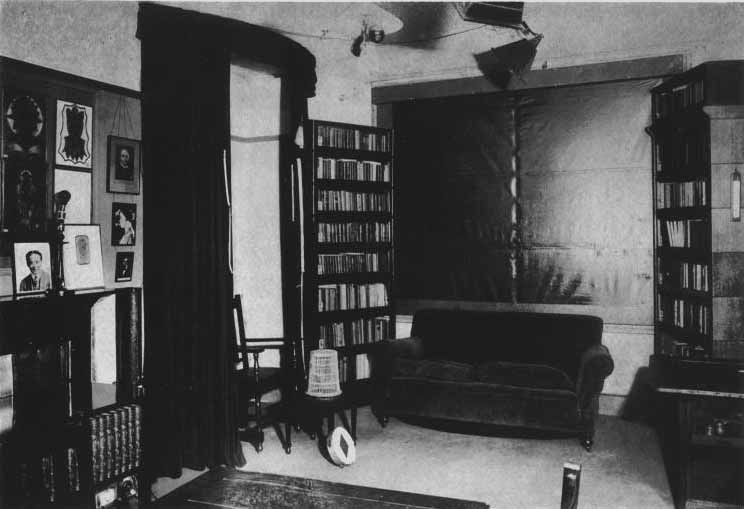
Séance room of the laboratory

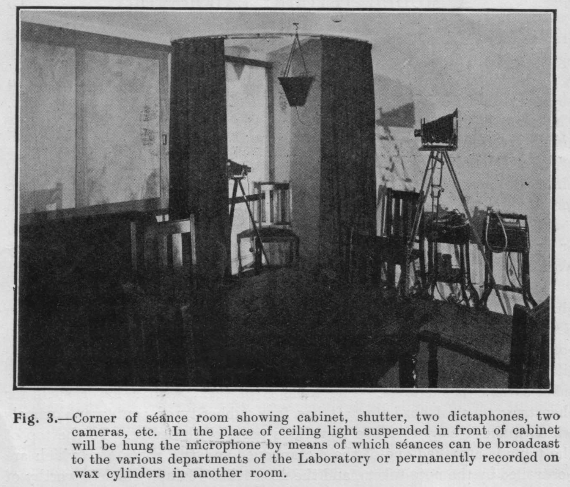
Equipment of the séance room

== See also ==
- Princeton Engineering Anomalies Research Laboratory
- List of parapsychology topics
