= William Fuller Maitland =

English picture collector (1813–1876)

William Fuller Maitland (10 March 1813 – 15 February 1876) was an English picture collector.

== Life ==
Born in Mayfair, Maitland was the second, but eldest surviving, son and heir of Ebenezer Fuller Maitland of Stansted, Essex and Shinfield Park in Berkshire, later of Park Place, also in Berkshire. He grew up at all three, as well as in Marylebone. He was educated by private tutors until he went to Trinity College, Cambridge, graduating B.A. in 1835, and M.A. in 1839.

During journeys to Italy Maitland encountered the works of early Italian masters. Their paintings formed the basis of a major part of his collection, anticipating later interest in Sandro Botticelli and others. English landscape painting was also largely represented. From the time of his first marriage in 1842 until his death, he lived at Stansted Hall.

Maitland died suddenly at Stansted Hall, Essex in 1876, and was buried in the parish on 19 February.

== Legacy ==
Maitland contributed to the Old Masters' Exhibitions of the Royal Academy, lending pictures over many years. After his death the bulk of his collection was exhibited at the South Kensington Museum; and subsequently nine of the major pictures were sold to the National Gallery, London.

== Family ==
Fuller in 1842 married Lydia, only daughter of Lieutenant-colonel Serjentson Prescott, in Florence. They had four children. By his second wife, Charlotte Elizabeth Dick, daughter of James Munro Macnabb, whom he married in 1852, he had an only daughter.

== Notes ==
Attribution

This article incorporates text from a publication now in the public domain: Lee, Sidney, ed. (1893). "Maitland, William Fuller". Dictionary of National Biography. Vol. 35. London: Smith, Elder & Co.
