= Gordon Higginson (medium) =

British spiritualist medium

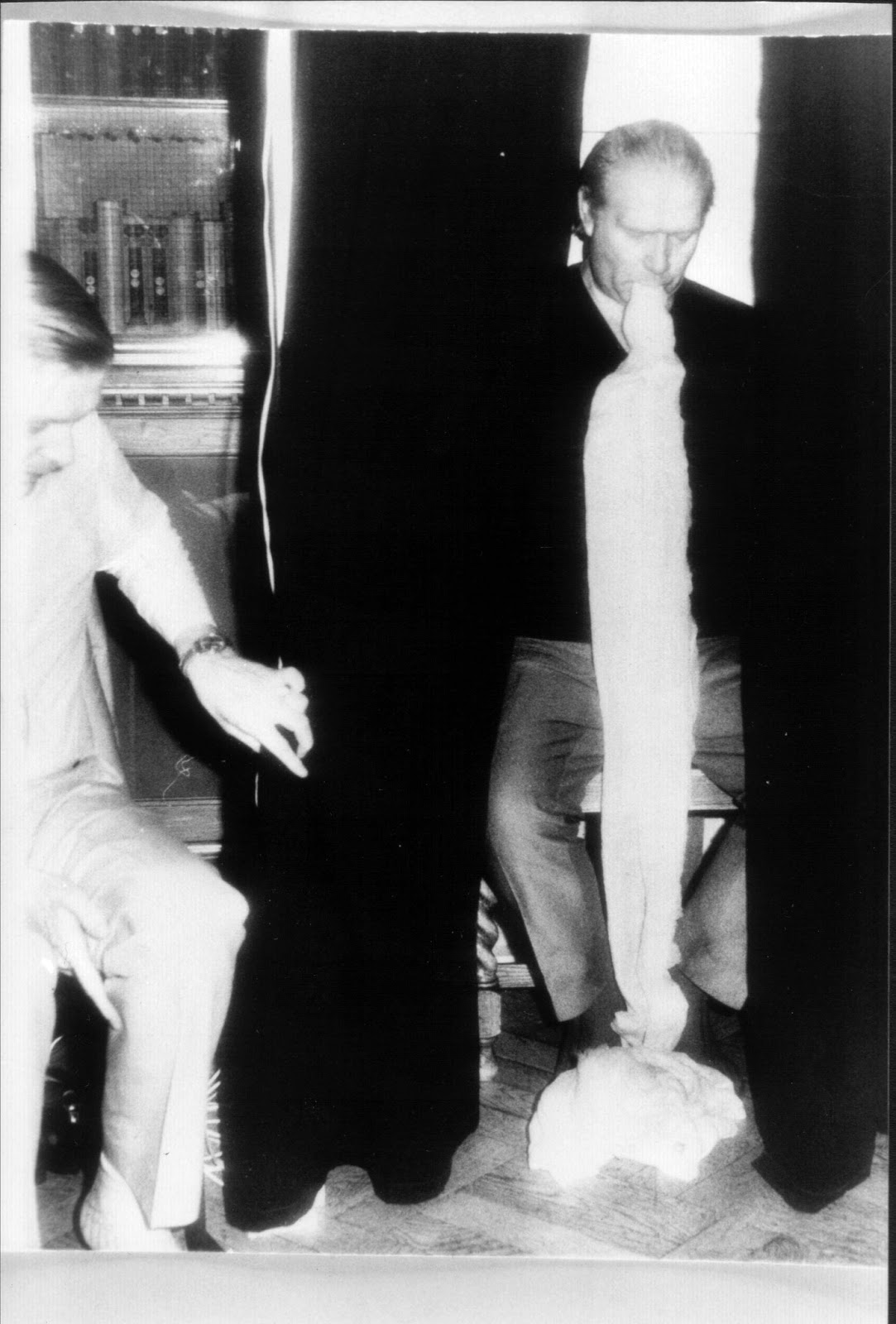
Gordon Higginson with alleged ectoplasm.

Gordon Mons Higginson (17 November 1918 – 18 January 1993) was a British spiritualist medium.

== Biography ==
He was born in Longton, Staffordshire. As a child Higginson became a member of Longton Lyceum and attended Longton Spiritualist Church. He claimed to have had mediumistic abilities from an early age. He served in the armed forces in World War II. After the war he worked as a medium in Belgium, Britain and France. He was also the President of the Spiritualists' National Union (SNU) for 23 years and Principal of the Arthur Findlay College from 1979 to 1993.

Higginson was accused of fraud throughout his career, even by spiritualists and members of the Spiritualists' National Union. In 1974 the parapsychologists Barrie Colvin and Frank Spedding attended a séance with Higginson and claimed that the ectoplasmic materialization figures were Higginson himself covered in cloth material. Frank Spedding wrote "the materialisations were crude fakes which should not have deceived anyone of normal intelligence". Before another séance Colvin searched the room and claimed to find muslin tightly wrapped underneath a seat.

In 1978, Higginson was accused of hot reading. At a mediumship sitting in Bristol in February 1976 he gave out names and addresses to his audience. The accusation was that information about his sitters was available from library lists, books and other documents, and that Higginson had been alone in the church for an hour before the sitting with the information.

Higginson's own comments about the allegations against him can be found in his book On the Side of Angels: Authorised Life Story compiled by Jean Bassett.

== Psychic surgery ==
Higginson was a proponent of psychic surgery. David and Helen Elizalde, who were self-proclaimed psychic surgeons who had come from Australia, were sponsored by Higginson to tour the UK. A video was taken at one of their sessions. Magician James Randi who examined the film dismissed the Elizalde's as frauds. He suggested that the trick consisted of a condom filled with pig's blood, and he replicated the phenomena himself by trickery.

Higginson had a session at the headquarters of the Spiritualist's National Union with the Elizalde's. Unknown to Higginson, a member secretly took away a sample of a blood clot that they had pretended to remove. The blood was forensically analysed and found to belong to a pig. Higginson was shaken by the discovery of fraud, but continued to believe that psychic surgery was genuine. After the exposure, the Elizalde's tour was cancelled.
