= Spiritualists' National Union =

Spiritualist organisation founded in the UK

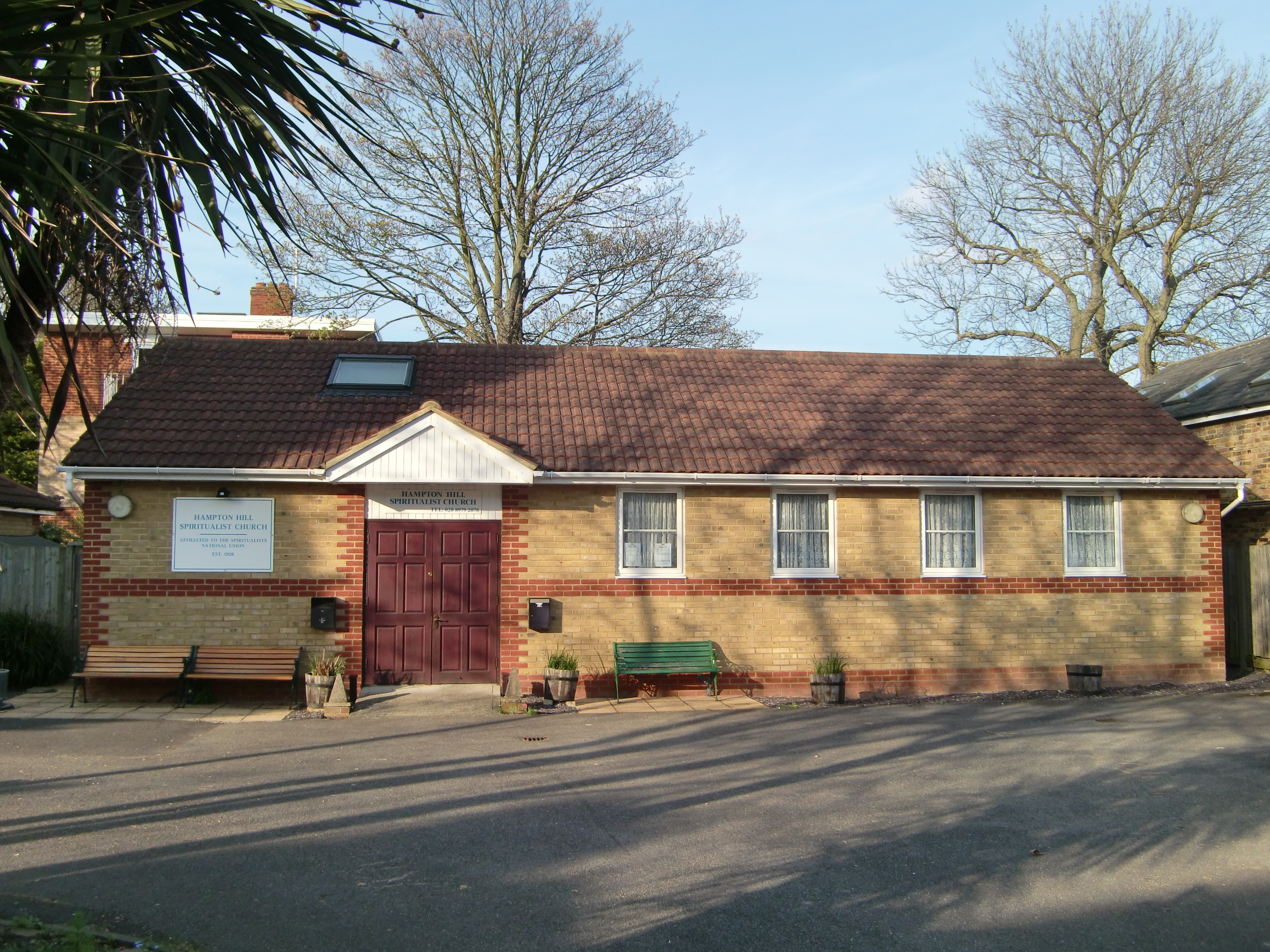
Hampton Hill Spiritualist Church

The Spiritualists' National Union (SNU) is a Spiritualist organisation, founded in the United Kingdom in 1901, and is one of the largest Spiritualist groups in the world. Its motto is Light, Nature, Truth.

Over its history, it has organised test cases regarding the legal status of spiritualist mediums, with regard to such matters as exemption from compulsory military National service. In legal terms, Spiritualist mediums were considered to violate such laws as the Vagrancy Act 1824, which outlawed fortune telling, and the Witchcraft Act 1735 (9 Geo. 2 c. 5). The Union campaigned against these laws for many years. They were eventually repealed by the Fraudulent Mediums Act 1951 (14 & 15 Geo. 6. c. 33), which legalised the practice of mediums unless it was shown that they were profiting financially from a fraudulent service. This act was repealed in April 2008, and fraudulent mediums are now covered by consumer protection legislation, namely The Consumer Protection from Unfair Trading Regulations 2008.

It has also performed more everyday services, such as organising war memorial services in the wake of the First World War.

The Union later organised educational courses in Spiritualism-related subjects, and has participated in scientific research into mediumship.

In 1995 the SNU acquired the publication Psychic News, which it ran until it was closed in July 2011, later reopening under different ownership.

In November 2018 the SNU represented Spiritualism for the first time at the National Memorial Service, held at the Cenotaph in Whitehall, London. The SNU's presence built on other efforts in this area, including the obelisk built at the National Memorial Arboretum in Staffordshire which is the focus of its annual Peace Service every July. The SNU operates The Arthur Findlay College based at Stansted Hall, Essex, UK.

== History ==
The SNU was founded on 18 October 1901 as the Spiritualists' National Union Ltd. In 1916, it campaigned to get government recognition for the religion of spiritualism.

== The Seven Principles ==
The Philosophy of SNU

Spiritualism is based upon seven principles. The Principles are not intended to be binding rules or the basis of a dogma but to provide a moral and ethical framework upon which people can base their lives.

1. The Fatherhood of God. The core belief of the religious philosophy of Spiritualism is the acceptance of a Divine Energy. This force, whatever name given to it, has created all there is and sustains all its creation. The ‘Spirit of God’ exists within and around everything. It is within all of us: we are all children of God so are part of one family. We acknowledge God as our Creator.

2. The Brotherhood of Man. We are all part of the universal creative force and therefore one family in God. The operation of true Unity throughout the world would create betterment to the lives of many, bringing equality, security and peace. Spiritualists try to understand the needs of others and help all people regardless of race, colour or creed

3. The Communion of Spirits and the Ministry of Angels. Communion with divine energy is a natural and essential part of existence. Communication between Spirit itself and its creations is an inbuilt ability. Spiritualists use this ability for communication directly, or via a medium, between those in the spirit world and ourselves. This is not supernatural; it is a normal activity. The main purpose of communication with the spirit world is to provide the guidance in this world. The Ministry of Angels brings enhanced wisdom to enlighten the individual, society and the world in which we live. This includes those who are dedicated to the welfare and service of humankind bringing inspiration guidance and healing.

4. The Continuous Existence of the human soul. Spirit is part of the ‘Creative Force’ and thus indestructible. Energy cannot be destroyed; it can only change its form. After death the physical body is left behind while the soul continues to exist in a different dimension that we call the spirit world. The individual personality continues unchanged by the event we call ‘death’.

5. Personal Responsibility. In divine wisdom, God has given us enormous potential; we can use that potential to improve our own lives and the lives of others. We have the ability to make decisions throughout our lives as we see fit. What each of us makes of our life is our Personal Responsibility - no one can replace or override that right. No other person or influence can put right our wrongdoings.

6. Compensation and Retribution hereafter for all the good and evil deeds done on earth. This Principle expresses the natural law of ‘cause and effect’. This law operates now, on earth, as well as in the spirit world. As we move through life making choices, the outcome of those choices affects our soul growth. When we leave this earthly life there will be no divine judgement. We will have the opportunity to reassess, take stock and decide what might have been done differently.

7. Eternal Progress open to every human soul. Eternity does not begin at death; Progress is open to all now! Any action, or intent to change, to promote soul growth and progression, creates a positive reaction. There will always be the opportunity to develop and move forward, no one is ever deprived of the all-embracing love of God.

These principles were the summary of faith of Emma Hardinge Britten, a pioneer for the UK's Spiritualist Movement and were adopted by the SNU. Emma was a medium and gifted orator and it was during her many speeches in trance state, that 'spirit communicators' gave various statements of faith. This resulted in the creation of the Seven Principles of Modern Spiritualism in the UK. Many believe that the influence of the 'spirit' of Socialist Robert Owen was paramount in this process, although Emma generally claimed they were "given by the spirits."

The interpretation of the Principles continues to be updated to more accurately represent the true intent and core beliefs of Spiritualists today.

== Recent Presidents ==
- 1970 - 1993 Gordon Higginson
- 1993 - 1996 Minister Eric L. Hatton
- 1996 - 2000 Minister Judith J. Seaman
- 2000 - 2010 Minister Duncan P. Gascoyne
- 2010 - 2022 Minister David R. Bruton
- 2022 onwards Minister Jackie Wright
- Hon. Presidents-in-Spirit: Sir Arthur Conan Doyle, Gordon Higginson
- Hon. President: Minister Eric Hatton
- Hon. Vice-President: Minister T. Horton, Minister D. Hudson

== See also ==
- Spiritualists
