= Nandor Fodor =

British and American parapsychologist, psychoanalyst, author and journalist

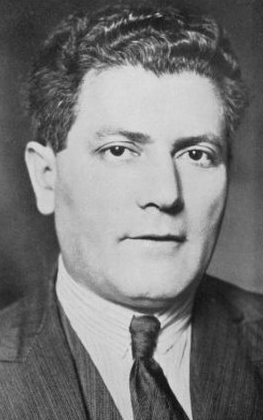
- Born: Nandor Friedlander; 13 May 1895; Beregszász, Austria-Hungary (now Berehove, Ukraine)
- Died: 17 May 1964 (aged 69); New York City, New York, USA
- Occupations: Parapsychologist; Psychoanalyst
- Organization(s): National Laboratory of Psychical Research; Society for Psychical Research; The Ghost Club

Nandor Fodor (May 13, 1895 – May 17, 1964) was a British and American parapsychologist, psychoanalyst, author and journalist of Hungarian origin.

== Biography ==
Fodor was born in Beregszász, Austro-Hungarian Empire (now Berehove in Ukraine), to a Jewish family. He received a doctorate in law from the Royal Hungarian University of Science in Budapest. He moved to New York to work as a journalist and to Britain in 1929 where he worked for a newspaper company.

Fodor was one of the leading authorities on poltergeists, haunting and paranormal phenomena usually associated with mediumship. He was at one time Sigmund Freud's associate and wrote on subjects like prenatal development and dream interpretation, although he is mostly credited for his magnum opus, Encyclopedia of Psychic Science, first published in 1934. Fodor was the London correspondent for the American Society for Psychical Research (1935-1939). He worked as an editor for the Psychoanalytic Review and was a member of the New York Academy of Sciences.

Fodor in the 1930s embraced paranormal phenomena but by the 1940s took a break from his previous work and advocated a psychoanalytic approach to psychic phenomena. He published skeptical newspaper articles on mediumship, which caused opposition from some spiritualists.

Among the subjects he closely studied was the case of Gef the talking mongoose, which served as the basis for the 2023 film Nandor Fodor and the Talking Mongoose.

Fodor was the father of Andrea Fodor Litkei, composer, author, soloist and wife of Ervin Litkei.

== Poltergeists ==
Fodor pioneered the theory that poltergeists are external manifestations of conflicts within the subconscious mind rather than autonomous entities with minds of their own. He proposed that poltergeist disturbances are caused by human agents suffering from some form of emotional stress or tension and compared reports of poltergeist activity to hysterical conversion symptoms resulting from emotional tension of the subject.

In 1938, Fodor investigated the Thornton Heath poltergeist case that involved Mrs. Forbes. According to Rosemary Guiley "Fodor asserted that the psychosis was an episodic mental disturbance of schizophrenic character, and that Mrs. Forbes' unconscious mind was responsible for the activities finally determined to be fraudulent. Fodor eventually identified the cause as sexual trauma that had occurred in Mrs. Forbes's childhood, and had been repressed." Because he was skeptical of the case, Fodor was heavily criticized by spiritualists and was dismissed from his post at the International Institute for Psychical Research. The spiritualist Arthur Findlay, who founded the institute, did not approve of his research and resigned. Fodor was attacked in the Spiritualist newspaper Psychic News, which he sued for libel.

Fodor published two scientific papers on poltergeist phenomena, The Psychoanalytic Approach to the Problems of Occultism (1945) and The Poltergeist, Psychoanalyzed (1948). "The poltergeist is not a ghost. It is a bundle of projected repressions," he stated. With the psychical researcher Hereward Carrington, Fodor co-authored Haunted People: Story of the Poltergeist down the Centuries (1951); the book received positive reviews.

The psychologist Robert Baker and the skeptical investigator Joe Nickell wrote that, in most cases, Fodor discovered ghosts are "pure inventions of the hauntee's subconscious" and praised Fodor's book The Haunted Mind as vastly entertaining. However, Fodor's belief that some poltergeist phenomena could be explained by psychokinesis has drawn criticism. Henry Gordon has stated that parapsychologists such as Fodor and William G. Roll took a speculative approach to the poltergeist subject, ignoring the rational explanation of deception in favour of a belief in the paranormal.

== Prenatal psychology ==
Fodor's work The Search for the Beloved (1949) has been described as an influential text in the field of prenatal psychology.

Fodor believed that a pregnant mother could communicate telepathically with the mind and body of her unborn child. He held that the mother could cause physical and psychological events in her unborn child depending on her state of mind. Science writer Martin Gardner wrote in 1957 that although Fodor had contributed to respectable psychoanalytical journals his views on telepathy were pseudoscience.

== Publications ==
Books

- Encyclopedia of Psychic Science. London: Arthurs Press, 1934.
- These Mysterious People. London: Rider, 1936.
- The Search for the Beloved: A Clinical Investigation of the Trauma of Birth and Pre-Natal Conditioning. New York: Hermitage Press, 1949.
- Haunted People: The Story of the Poltergeist Down the Centuries. [with Hereward Carrington]. New York: Dutton, 1951.
- New Approaches to Dream Interpretation. New York, 1951. Reprint, New Hyde Park, N.Y.: University Books, 1951.
- On the Trail of the Poltergeist. New York: Citadel Press, 1958.
- The Haunted Mind: A Psychoanalyst Looks at the Supernatural. New York: Garrett Publications, 1959.
- Mind Over Space. New York: Citadel, 1962.
- Freud: Dictionary of Psychoanalysis. Fawcett Premier, 1963.
- Between Two Worlds. New York: Paperback Library, 1964.
- The Unaccountable. New York: Award Books, 1968.
- Freud, Jung, and Occultism. University Books, 1971.

Papers

- Fodor, N. (1936) "The Lajos Pap Experiments". International Institute for Psychical Research. Bulletin II.
- Fodor, N. (1937) "I Investigate Another Case of Haunting". Journal of the American Society for Psychical Research: 29.
- Fodor, N. (1937) "Mysterious Knockings". Journal of the American Society for Psychical Research: 189–90.
- Fodor, N. (1939) "The Ghost in Chelsea". Journal of the American Society for Psychical Research: 55.
- Fodor, N. (1945) "A Psychoanalytic Approach to the Problems of Occultism". Journal of Clinical Psychopathology and Psychotherapy, July: 69.
- Fodor, N. (1945) "The Lure of the Supernatural". Psychiatric Quarterly 20: 258.
- Fodor, N. (1946). "Sex and Mediumship". Round Robin 2: 11–14.
- Fodor, N. (1947) "Telepathy in Analysis". Psychiatric Quarterly 21: 171–89.
- Fodor, N. (1948) "The Poltergeist Psychoanalyzed". Psychiatric Quarterly 22: 195–203.
- Fodor, N. (1949) "I Psychoanalyze Ghosts". Mechanix Illustrated, September: 150.
- Fodor, N. (1956) "Was Harry Price a Fraud?". Tomorrow 4(2): 2.
