= Helen Duncan =

Scottish medium (1897–1956)

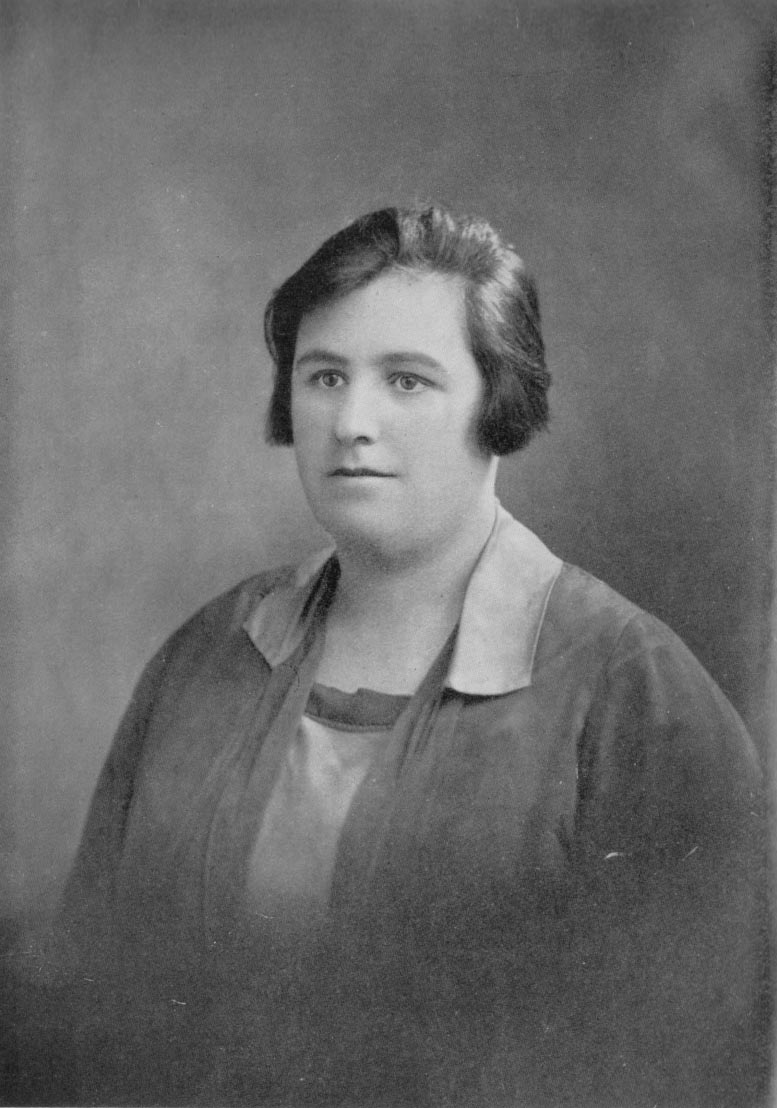
- Born: Victoria MacFarlane; 25 November 1897; Callander, Perthshire, Scotland
- Died: 6 December 1956 (aged 59); Edinburgh, Scotland
- Other name: Hellish Nell
- Occupation: Medium
- Spouse: Henry Duncan (1916–1967)

Victoria Helen McCrae Duncan (née MacFarlane, 25 November 1897 – 6 December 1956) was a Scottish medium best known as the last person to be imprisoned under the Witchcraft Act 1735 (9 Geo. 2. c. 5) for fraudulent claims. She was famous for claiming to produce ectoplasm, which was proven to be made from cheesecloth.

== Early life ==
Victoria Helen MacFarlane was born in Callander, Perthshire on 25 November 1897, the daughter of Archibald McFarlane, a slater, and Isabella Rattray. At school, she alarmed her fellow pupils with her dire prophecies and hysterical behaviour, to the distress of her mother (a member of the Presbyterian church). After leaving school, she worked at Dundee Royal Infirmary, and in 1916, she married Henry Duncan, a cabinetmaker and wounded war veteran, who was supportive of her supposed paranormal talents. A mother of six, she also worked part-time in a bleach factory.

== Practising medium ==
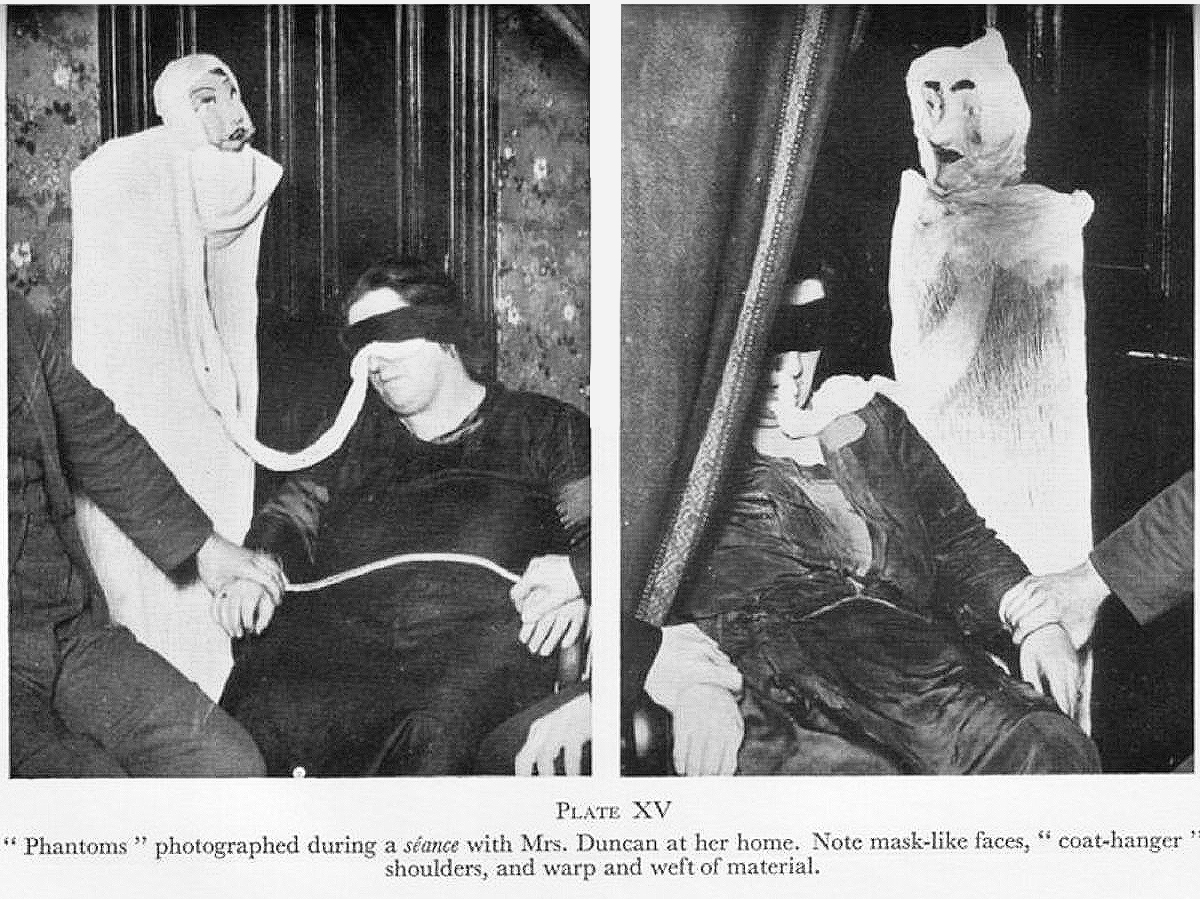
Photograph shot by Harvey Metcalfe during a 1928 séance, revealing Duncan with dolls.

In 1926, she developed from clairvoyant to physical medium by offering séances in which she claimed to be able to permit the spirits of recently deceased persons to materialise, by emitting ectoplasm from her mouth.

In 1928, photographer Harvey Metcalfe attended a series of séances at Duncan's home. During a séance he took various flash photographs of Duncan and her alleged "materialization" of spirits, including her spirit guide "Peggy". His photographs reveal that the spirits were fraudulently produced: Duncan's equipment included a doll made from a painted papier-mâché mask draped in an old sheet.

In 1931, the London Spiritualist Alliance (LSA) examined Duncan's methods. An early examination of pieces of Duncan's ectoplasm revealed that it was made of cheesecloth, paper mixed with the white of egg and lavatory paper stuck together. One of Duncan's tricks was to swallow and regurgitate some of her ectoplasm, and she was persuaded to swallow a tablet of methylene blue before one of her séances by the LSA committee to rule out any chance of this trick being performed, and because of this, no ectoplasm appeared. The committee concluded in a report that the "material was swallowed by Mrs Duncan at some time previous to the sitting and subsequently regurgitated by her for the purpose of exhibition."

=== Harry Price's investigation ===
A piece of ectoplasm from one of Duncan's early séances was obtained and secured in a bottle of distilled water. It was given to the psychical researcher Harry Price, who was originally enthusiastic about the sample. However, when he gave the sample to a chemist for an analysis it was discovered that it had been made from egg white mixed with chemicals. Price later duplicated Duncan's ectoplasm with similar substances.

In 1931, Price paid Duncan £50 (almost £4,300 in 2024) to conduct a number of test séances. She was suspected of swallowing cheesecloth, which was then regurgitated as "ectoplasm". Price had proven through analysis of a sample of ectoplasm produced by Duncan that it was made of cheesecloth. She reacted violently at attempts to X-ray her, running from the laboratory and making a scene in the street, where her husband had to restrain her, destroying the test's controlled nature. According to Price, in a report of the mediumship of Duncan:

At the conclusion of the fourth seance we led the medium to a settee and called for the apparatus. At the sight of it, the lady promptly went into a trance. She recovered, but refused to be X-rayed. Her husband went up to her and told her it was painless. She jumped up and gave him a smashing blow on the face which sent him reeling. Then she went for Dr. William Brown who was present. He dodged the blow. Mrs. Duncan, without the slightest warning, dashed out into the street, had an attack of hysteria and began to tear her seance garment to pieces. She clutched the railings and screamed and screamed. Her husband tried to pacify her. It was useless. I leave the reader to visualise the scene. A seventeen-stone woman, clad in black sateen tights, locked to the railings, screaming at the top of her voice. A crowd collected and the police arrived. The medical men with us explained the position and prevented them from fetching the ambulance. We got her back into the Laboratory and at once she demanded to be X-rayed. In reply, Dr. William Brown turned to Mr. Duncan and asked him to turn out his pockets. He refused and would not allow us to search him. There is no question that his wife had passed him the cheese-cloth in the street. However, they gave us another seance and the "control' said we could cut off a piece of "teleplasm" when it appeared. The sight of half-a-dozen men, each with a pair of scissors waiting for the word, was amusing. It came and we all jumped. One of the doctors got hold of the stuff and secured a piece. The medium screamed and the rest of the "teleplasm" went down her throat. This time it wasn't cheese-cloth. It proved to be paper, soaked in white of egg, and folded into a flattened tube... Could anything be more infantile than a group of grown-up men wasting time, money, and energy on the antics of a fat female crook.

In his report, Price published photographs of Duncan in his laboratory that revealed fake ectoplasm made from cheesecloth, rubber gloves and cut-out heads from magazine covers which she pretended to her audiences were spirits. Psychologist William McDougall, who attended two of the séances, pronounced her "whole performance fraudulent" in an appendix to the report.

Following Price's report, Duncan's former maid Mary McGinlay confessed in detail to having aided Duncan in her mediumship tricks, and Duncan's husband admitted that the ectoplasm materialisations were the result of regurgitation.

Duncan frequently had nosebleeds during séances; William Brown suggested that this was another of Duncan's hiding places for her fake ectoplasm. In 1936, psychical researcher Nandor Fodor offered money to Duncan if she would be filmed with an infrared camera during a séance; she refused.

=== 1933 conviction ===
In a séance on 6 January 1933 in Edinburgh, the spirit of a little girl called Peggy supposedly emerged in the séance room. A sitter named Esson Maule grabbed her; the lights were turned on and the spirit was revealed to be made from a stockinette undervest. The police were called, and Duncan was prosecuted and fined ten pounds. The undervest was used as evidence which led to Duncan's conviction of fraudulent mediumship at the Edinburgh Sheriff Court trial on 11 May 1933.

The spiritualist journal Light endorsed the court decision that Duncan was fraudulent and supported Price's investigation that revealed her ectoplasm was cheesecloth. Duncan's husband was also suspected of acting as her accomplice by hiding her fake ectoplasm.

=== Ectoplasm sample ===
Malcolm Gaskill, who examined holdings from the Society for Psychical Research at the Cambridge University Library, found a sample of Duncan's ectoplasm. The ectoplasm proved to be made from a length of artificial silk. In 2018, the sample was displayed at the Spellbound exhibition on the history of magic at the Ashmolean Museum in Oxford. The sample is now held at Cambridge University Library and a photograph can be seen on the library website.

== HMS Barham sinking ==
During World War II, in November 1941, Duncan held a séance in Portsmouth at which she claimed the spirit materialization of a sailor told her HMS Barham had been sunk. Because the sinking of HMS Barham was revealed, in strict confidence, only to the relatives of casualties, and not announced to the public until late January 1942, the Navy started to take an interest in her activities. Two lieutenants were among her audience at a séance on 14 January 1944. One of these was a Lieutenant Worth, who was not impressed as a white cloth figure had appeared behind the curtains claiming to be his aunt, but he had no deceased aunt. In the same sitting, another figure appeared claiming to be his sister, but Worth replied his sister was alive and well. Worth was disgusted by the séance and reported it to the police. This was followed up on 19 January, when undercover policemen arrested her at another séance as a white-shrouded manifestation appeared. This proved to be Duncan herself, in a white cloth which she attempted to conceal when discovered, and she was arrested.

Researcher Graeme Donald wrote that Duncan could have easily found out about HMS Barham and she had no genuine psychic powers. According to Donald:

The loss of HMS Barham, torpedoed off the coast of Egypt on 25 November 1941, was indeed kept quiet for a while, but letters of condolence were sent out to families of the 861 dead, asking them to keep the secret until the official announcement. So, allowing for perhaps 10 people in each family, there were about 9,000 people who knew of the sinking; if each of them told only one other person, there were 20,000 people in the country aware of the sinking, and so on – hardly a closely guarded secret. In short, news of the sinking spread like wildfire; Duncan simply picked up the gossip and decided to turn it into profit.

A leak concerning HMS Barham was later discovered. A secretary of the First Sea Lord had been indiscreet to Professor Michael Postan of the Ministry of Economic Warfare. Postan said that he believed he had been told officially, and was not arrested.

Duncan was found to be in possession of a mocked-up HMS Barham cap-tally. This apparently related to an alleged manifestation of the spirit of a dead sailor on HMS Barham, although Duncan apparently did not know that after 1939 sailors' cap-tallies carried only 'H.M.S.' and did not identify their ship. She was initially arrested under section 4 of the Vagrancy Act 1824, a minor offence tried by magistrates. The authorities regarded the case as more serious, and eventually discovered section 4 of the Witchcraft Act 1735, covering fraudulent "spiritual" activity, which was triable before a jury. Charged alongside her for conspiracy to contravene this Act were Ernest and Elizabeth Homer, who operated the Psychic centre in Portsmouth, and Frances Brown, who was Duncan's agent and went with her to set up séances. There were seven counts, two of conspiracy to contravene the Witchcraft Act, two of obtaining money by false pretences, and three of the common law offence of public mischief. The prosecution may be explained by the mood of suspicion prevailing at the time: the authorities were afraid that she could continue to reveal classified information, whatever her source was. There were also concerns that she was exploiting the recently bereaved, as the Recorder noted when passing sentence.

Duncan's trial for fraudulent witchcraft was a minor cause célèbre in wartime London. Alfred Dodd, a historian and senior Freemason, testified he was convinced she was authentic. The trial was complicated by the fact that a police raid on the séance in Portsmouth, leading to the arrest of Helen Duncan, yielded no physical evidence of the fraudulent use of cheesecloth, and was therefore based entirely on witness testimony, the majority of which denied any wrongdoing. Duncan was barred by the judge from demonstrating her alleged powers as part of her defence against being fraudulent. The jury brought in a guilty verdict on count one, and the judge then discharged them from giving verdicts on the other counts, as he held that they were alternative offences for which Duncan might have been convicted had the jury acquitted her on the first count. Duncan was imprisoned for nine months, Brown for four months, and the Homers were bound over. After the verdict, Winston Churchill wrote a memo to Home Secretary Herbert Morrison, complaining about the misuse of court resources on the "obsolete tomfoolery" of the charge.

== Repeal of the Witchcraft Act ==
In 1944, Duncan was one of the last people convicted under the Witchcraft Act 1735 (9 Geo. 2 c. 5), which made falsely claiming to procure spirits a crime. She was sentenced to nine months' imprisonment. When convicted, she cried out "I have done nothing; is there a God?"

On her release in 1945, Duncan promised to stop conducting séances, but she was arrested during another one in 1956. She died at her home in Edinburgh a short time later. Duncan's trial almost certainly contributed to the repeal of the Witchcraft Act 1735, which was contained in the Fraudulent Mediums Act 1951 (14 & 15 Geo. 6. c. 33) promoted by Walter Monslow, Labour Member of Parliament for Barrow-in-Furness. The campaign to repeal the Act had largely been led by Thomas Brooks, another Labour MP, who was a spiritualist. Duncan's original conviction still stood, and it was the subject of a sustained campaign to have it overturned.

== Death ==
Duncan died at her home in Edinburgh, on 6 December 1956, a short time after another seance. It is believed by spiritualists that she died as a result of the sudden impact of ectoplasm snapping back into her body when the police that raided her séance turned on the light. Contrary to what these spiritualists have written, it is unlikely that there was anything unusual about Duncan's death, nor was it caused by the police disturbing her "trance." Duncan's medical records indicated that she had a long history of poor health, and as early as 1944 was described as an obese woman who could move only slowly as she suffered from heart trouble.

== Legacy ==
After her death, Duncan was widely cited as an example of a fraudulent medium. However, some spiritualists continued to defend her. According to Jenny Hazelgrove,

Her opponents condemned her mediumship out of hand, while her supporters took up the opposite position. Any suspicious aspects of the Duncan mediumship – the wood-pulp "ectoplasm", the "ectoplasmic" drapery that resembled cheese cloth – were glossed over by her followers in the interests of producing a wholly idealised picture of her life and mediumship.

Psychical researcher Simeon Edmunds also noted that spiritualists had a history of ignoring the evidence of fraud in the Duncan case. He criticized the spiritualist press such as Psychic News for biased reporting and distorting facts. Science writer Mary Roach, in her book Spook: Science Tackles the Afterlife (2007), favorably mentioned Price's methods in debunking Duncan as a fraudulent medium.

In 2009, a heavy metal band, Seventh Son, recorded and released a song, "The Last Witch in England" [sic], depicting Duncan's life and her claims about the sinking of HMS Barham.

The naval investigation and subsequent trial were dramatised in a radio play, The Last Witch Trial, by Melissa Murray, starring Joanna Monro as Duncan and Indira Varma as the undercover investigator. It was broadcast by BBC Radio 4 on 4 June 2010.

Descendants and supporters of Duncan have campaigned on several occasions to have her posthumously pardoned. Petitions for a posthumous pardon were rejected by the Scottish Parliament in 2001, 2008 and 2012. Duncan's supporters maintain a website and online petition where they continue to campaign for her pardon.

== Gallery ==
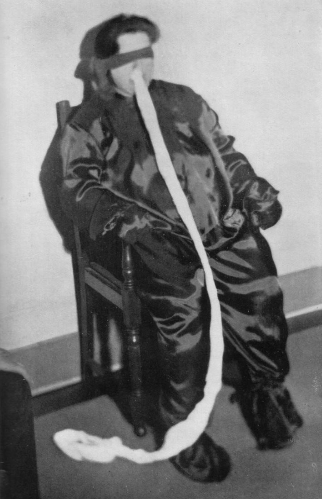
Duncan with a roll of cheesecloth

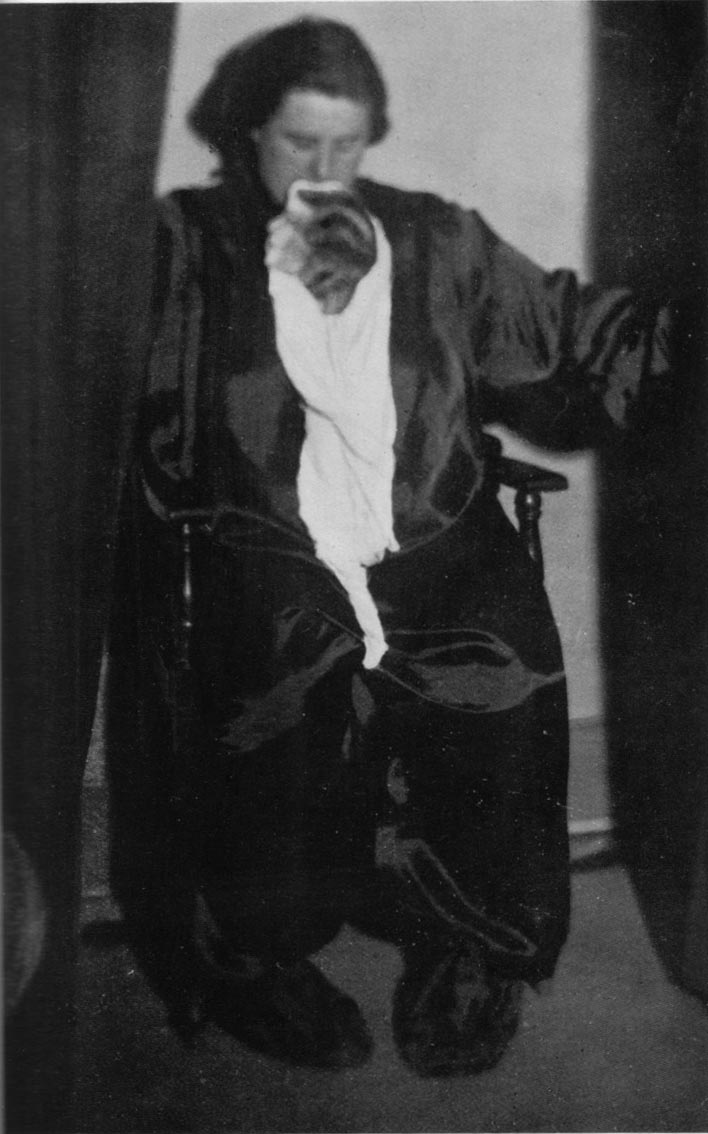
Duncan with cheesecloth and a cut out newspaper face

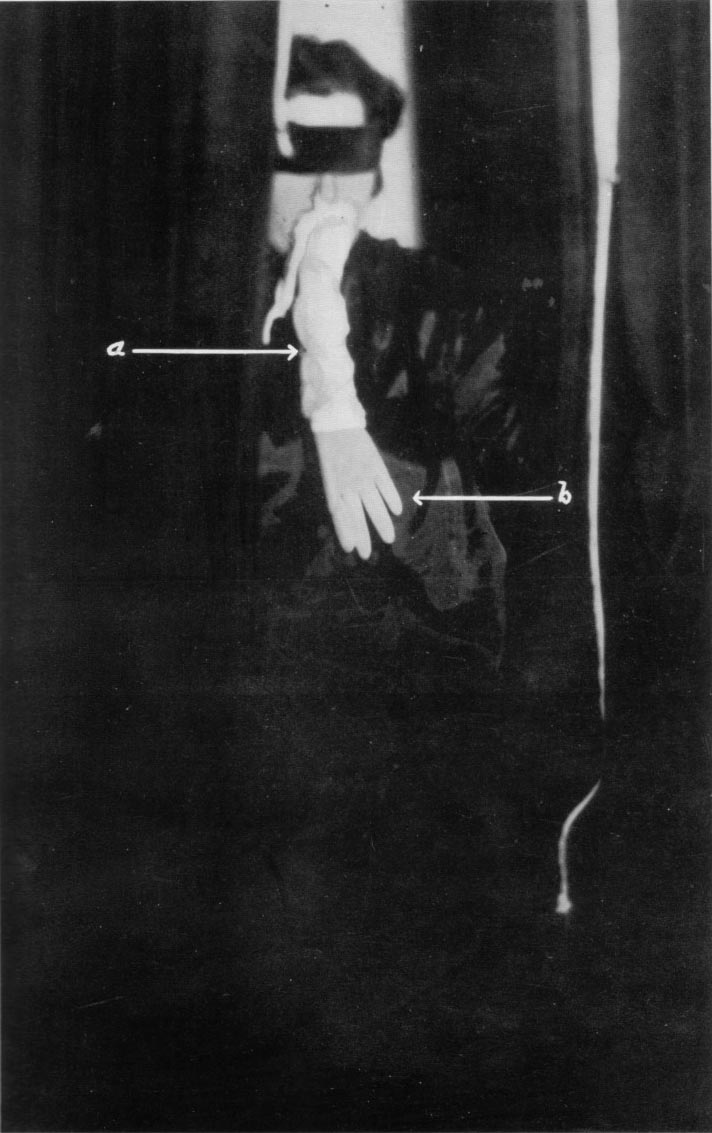
Duncan with ectoplasm made from a rubber glove

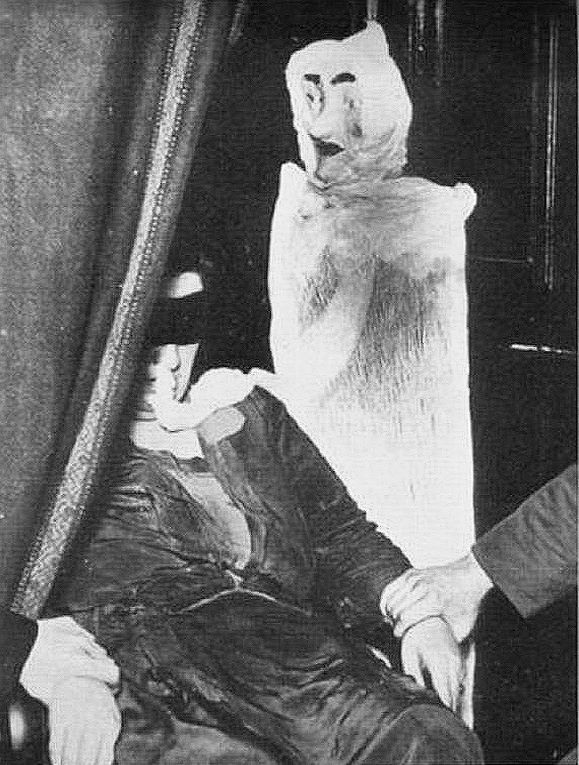
Duncan with alleged ectoplasm figure made from a coat-hanger, cloth and a mask
