= Stansted Hall =

Building in Stansted Mountfitchet, Essex, England

Coordinates: 51.89692°N 0.21247°E

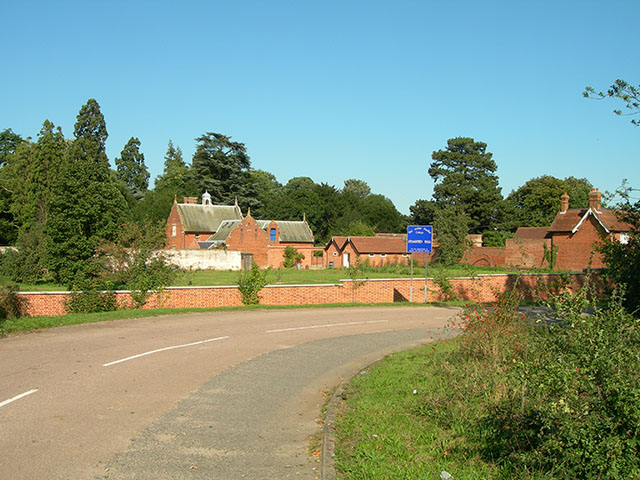
Stansted Hall, 2006

Stansted or Steanstead Hall is located in Stansted Mountfitchet, Essex, East of England, United Kingdom. It was the country seat of the Earls of Essex during the reign of Henry VIII of England.

The Tudor-era Stansted Hall was partially destroyed by fire. So in the early 1660s Sir Thomas Myddleton built a new hall, a massive Jacobean four-story building with two large domed-shaped towers. The older Tudor hall remained standing nearby until at least 1770.

The famous landscape designer Humphry Repton produced one of his ‘red books’ of designs for Stansted in 1791.

Ebenezer Maitland (1780-1858) married Miss Berthia Ellis (1780-1863), the granddaughter of William Fuller (d.1800), a London banker. When his wife’s maiden aunt Sarah Fuller, William’s only surviving heiress, died in 1810, left all she possessed to the couple – a substantial fortune estimated at £500,000 (equivalent to £33,947,336 in 2025) – stipulating that Ebenezer assume the surname Fuller Maitland. So Stansted Hall became the property of the Fuller Maitland family. The manor house that stands today was begun in 1871 by William Fuller Maitland (d. 1876) and completed in 1876 following his death, adding some elements recovered from the surviving Jacobean tower of the previous manor hall. The Fuller-Maitland family owned Stansted Hall for many decades, until William Fuller-Maitland (d. November 1932) sold the estate in 1921.

James Arthur Findlay bought the estate in 1923 from Sir Albert Ball. In 1964 Stansted Hall, its grounds and an endowment were transferred by Mr. Findlay to the Arthur Findlay College, a college of spiritualism and psychic sciences.
