= Heinrich Melzer =

German spiritualist medium (born 1873)

Heinrich Melzer (born 1873) was a German Spiritualist medium.

== History ==
Melzer was born in Dresden, Germany. For thirty years he gave séances and claimed to have the ability to materialize stones and flowers. In the séance room he would only materialize the flowers under the table, and as the table was not checked skeptics accused him of simply hiding the flowers under the table before his séances. When the room was checked and scientific controls were introduced no flowers appeared. In 1926 Melzer was exposed as a fraud as he was caught with small stones attached to the back of his ears by flesh coloured tape.
