= William van der Weyde =

American photographer (1871–1929)

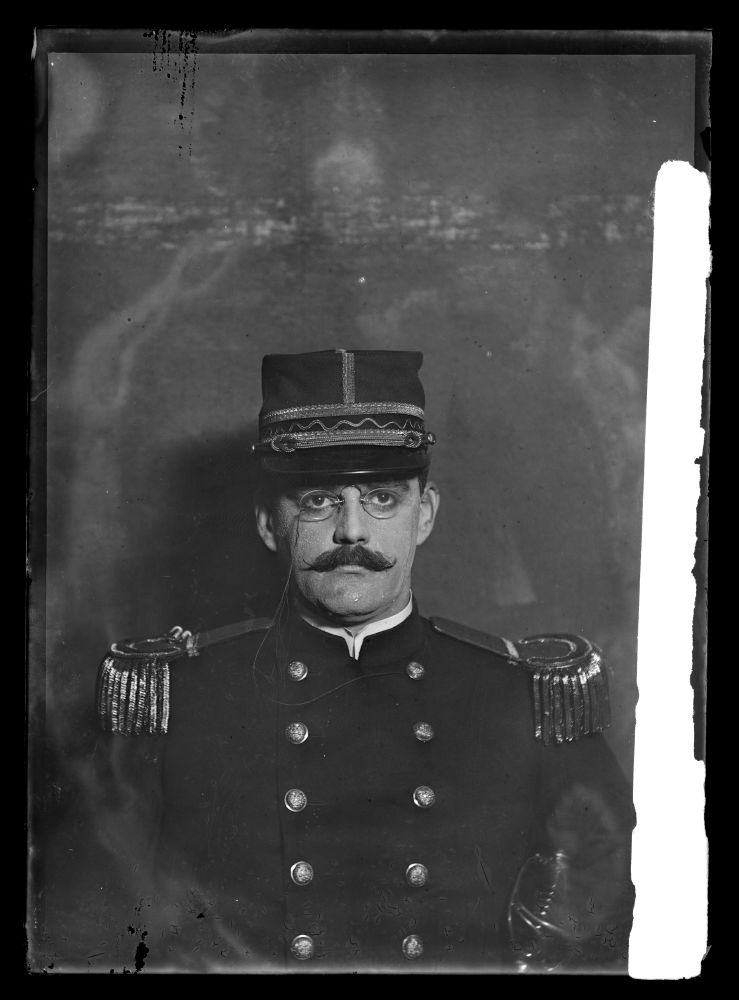
Alfred Dreyfus, portrait by van der Weyde, c. 1900

William M. van der Weyde (1871 – 10 July 1929), sometime spelled William M. Vander Weyde, was an American photojournalist based in New York City. "His crisp portraits captured the day's leading writers, poets, and athletes for publications such as Success, Literary Digest, and McClure's magazines."

Van der Weyde started his career during the Spanish–American War. William van der Weyde was married to Katherine MacNamee who was also a photographer.
