= Frank Decker (medium) =

American spiritual medium

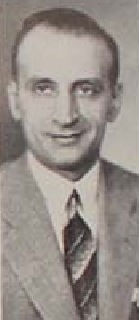
- Occupation: Spiritualist medium

Frank Decker was a 20th-century American spiritualist medium who was discovered to be a fraud.

== Career ==
Decker was born to a family of Syrian origin. He lived in Greenwich Village in New York City. In January, 1930 Decker took a challenge to win $21,000 if he could prove his supposed mediumship powers. Decker would not win the prize if the magician Joseph Dunninger could duplicate the same physical phenomena. In the séance Decker claimed spirits had moved trumpets around the room and spoken in them. After the séance was finished, Joseph Dunninger replicated by natural means the same trumpet phenomena as Decker. Decker did not win the prize.

In 1932, Decker was exposed as a fraud. A magician and séance sitter who called himself M. Taylor presented a mail bag and Decker agreed to lock himself inside it. During the séance objects were moved around the room and it was claimed spirits had released Decker from the bag. It was later discovered to have been a trick as Martin Sunshine, a magic dealer admitted that he sold Decker a trick mail bag, such as stage escapologists use, and had acted as the medium's confederate by pretending to be M. Taylor, a magician. Edwin F. Bowers had defended Decker. In his book Spiritualism's Challenge, Bowers had made incorrect statements about the magician and was threatened with a lawsuit from the Society of American Magicians. He later removed the incorrect statements from his book.

In 1933, Decker was investigated by the psychical researcher Harry Price at the National Laboratory of Psychical Research. Under strict scientific controls that Price contrived, Decker failed to produce any phenomena at all.
