= Reflexology =

Alternative medical practice involving pressure to parts of the body

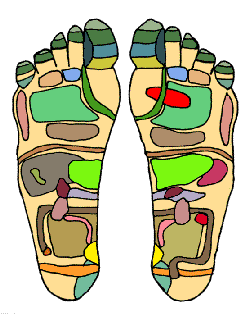
An example of a reflexology chart, demonstrating the areas of the feet that practitioners believe correspond with organs in the "zones" of the body.

Reflexology, also known as zone therapy, is a pseudomedical practice involving the application of pressure to specific points on the feet, ears, and hands. This is done using thumb, finger, and hand massage techniques without the use of oil or lotion. It is based on a pseudoscientific system of zones and reflex areas that purportedly reflect an image of the body on the feet and hands, with the premise that such work on the feet and hands causes a physical change to the supposedly related areas of the body. There is no convincing scientific evidence that reflexology is effective for any medical condition, or provides any health benefits.

== Definition ==
In a Cochrane Collaboration review, reflexology is defined as follows: "Reflexology is gentle manipulation or pressing on certain parts of the foot to produce an effect elsewhere in the body."

The Australian Government's Department of Health define reflexology as "a system of applying pressure, usually to the feet, which practitioners believe stimulates energy and releases 'blockages' in specific areas that cause pain or illness."

== History ==
Similar practices such as acupuncture have been practiced in China. Reflexology was introduced to the United States in 1913 by William H. Fitzgerald, M.D. (1872–1942), an ear, nose, and throat specialist, and Edwin F. Bowers. Fitzgerald claimed that applying pressure had an anesthetic effect on other areas of the body. It was modified in the 1930s and 1940s by Eunice D. Ingham (1889–1974), a nurse and physiotherapist. Ingham claimed that the feet and hands were especially sensitive and mapped the entire body into "reflexes" on the feet, renaming "zone therapy" as reflexology. Many of the modern reflexologists use Ingham's methods, or similar techniques of reflexologist Laura Norman.

== Efficacy ==
In 2015, the Australian Government's Department of Health published the results of a review of alternative therapies that sought to determine if any were suitable for being covered by health insurance. Reflexology was one of 17 therapies evaluated for which no clear evidence of effectiveness was found. Accordingly, in 2017, the Australian government named reflexology as a practice that would not qualify for insurance subsidy, saying this step would "ensure taxpayer funds are expended appropriately and not directed to therapies lacking evidence".

Reviews from 2009 and 2011 have found no evidence sufficient to support the use of reflexology for any medical condition. A 2009 systematic review of randomized controlled trials concludes: "The best evidence available to date does not demonstrate convincingly that reflexology is an effective treatment for any medical condition."

There is no clinical evidence that reflexology is effective to treat cancer. Cancer Research UK have commented that "there is no scientific evidence to prove that reflexology can cure or prevent any type of disease, including cancer".

== Claimed mechanism ==
There is no consensus among reflexologists on how reflexology is supposed to work; a unifying theme is the idea that areas on the foot correspond to areas of the body and that by manipulating these one can improve health through one's qi. Reflexologists divide the body into ten equal vertical zones, five on the right and five on the left. Concerns have been raised by medical professionals that treating potentially serious illnesses with reflexology, which has no proven efficacy, could delay the seeking of appropriate medical treatment.

Reflexologists posit that the blockage of an energy field, invisible life force, or Qi, can prevent healing. Another tenet of reflexology is the belief that practitioners can relieve stress and pain in other parts of the body through the manipulation of the feet. One claimed explanation is that the pressure received in the feet may send signals that 'balance' the nervous system or release chemicals such as endorphins that reduce stress and pain. These hypotheses are rejected by the medical community, which cites a lack of scientific evidence and the well-tested germ theory of disease.

Reflexology's claim to manipulate energy (Qi) is unsupported by science; there is no scientific evidence for the existence of life energy (Qi), "energy balance", "crystalline structures" or "pathways" in the body.

In Trick or Treatment? Alternative Medicine on Trial, Simon Singh states that if indeed the hands and feet "reflect" the internal organs, reflexology might be expected to explain how such "reflection" was derived from the process of Darwinian natural selection, but Singh says that no argument or evidence has been adduced.

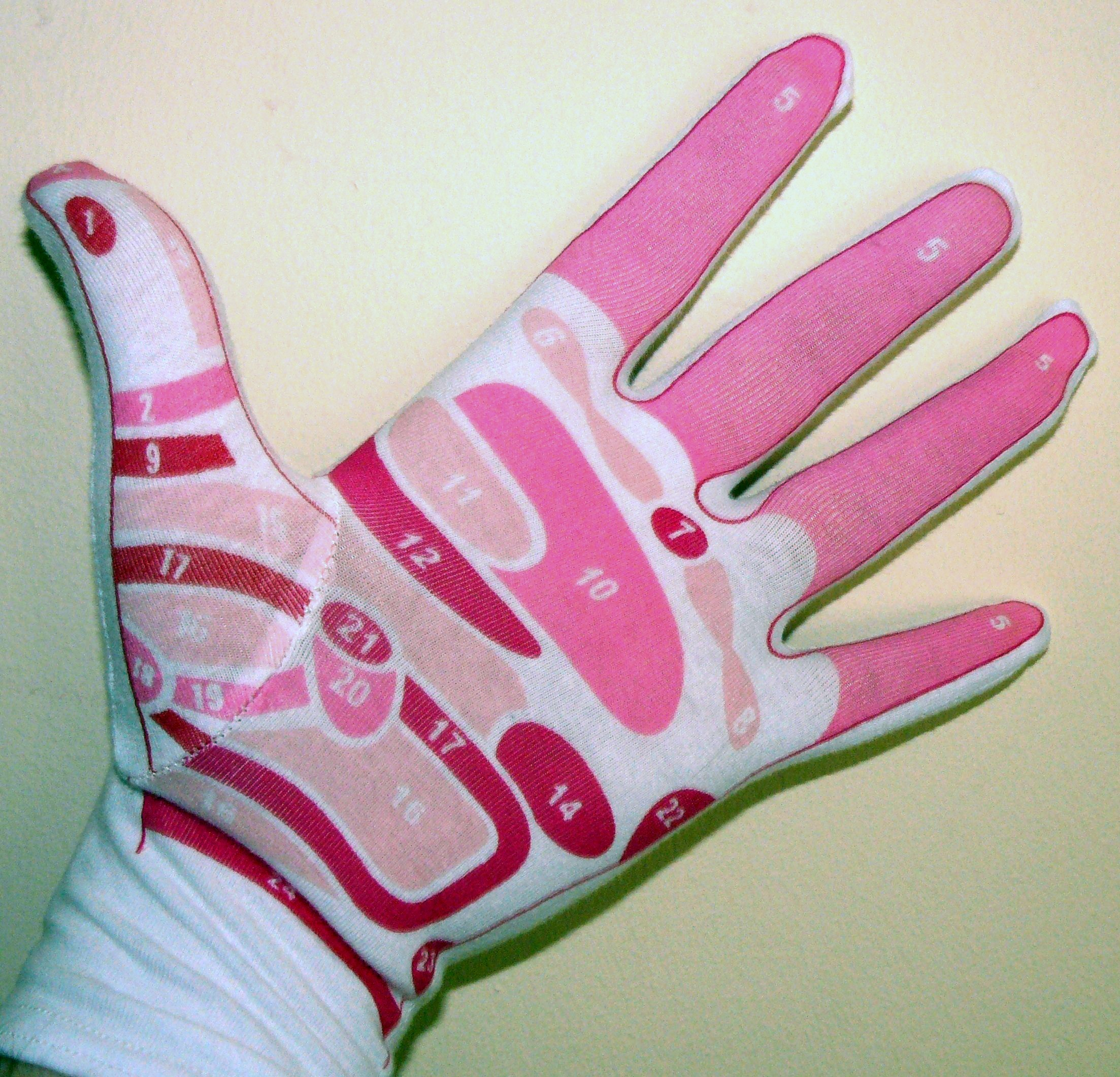
An example of a reflexology chart of the hand, demonstrating the areas that practitioners believe correspond with organs in the "zones" of the body.

== Regulation ==
In the United Kingdom, reflexology is coordinated on a voluntary basis by the Complementary and Natural Healthcare Council (CNHC). Registrants are required to meet Standards of Proficiency outlined by Profession Specific Boards but since CNHC is voluntary anyone practicing can describe themselves as a reflexologist. When the CNHC began admitting reflexologists, a skeptic searched for, and found, 14 of them who were claiming efficacy on illnesses. Once pointed out, the CNHC had the claims retracted as it conflicted with the UK's Advertising Standards Authority code.

Reflexology is one of the most used alternative therapies in Denmark. A national survey from 2005 showed that 21.4% of the Danish population had used reflexology at some point and 6.1% had used reflexology within the previous year.

A study from Norway showed that 5.6% of the Norwegian population in 2007 had used reflexology within the last 12 months.

== See also ==
- Acupressure
- Foot massage
- Shiatsu
