= Tony Cornell =

British parapsychologist

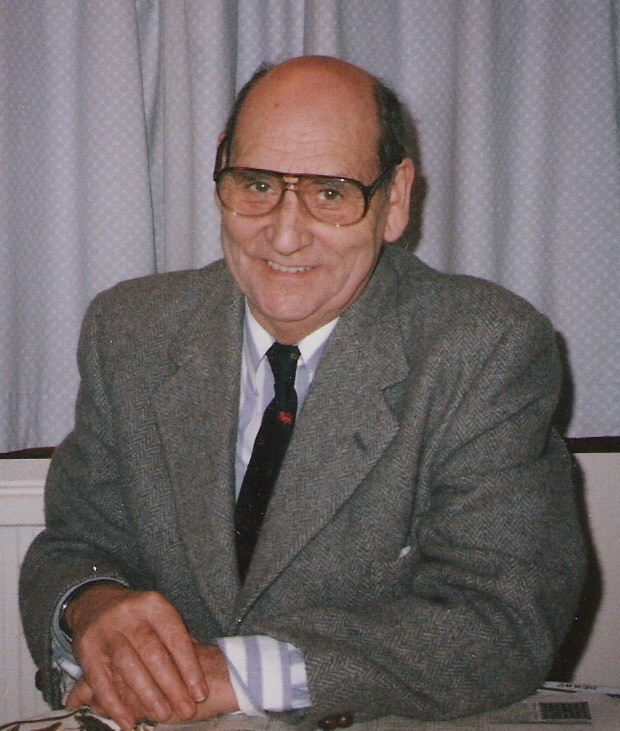

Anthony Donald Cornell (1924 – 10 April 2010) was a British parapsychologist and prominent figure in the investigations of ghosts and other paranormal activity across the United Kingdom during the later part of the twentieth century. He appeared in numerous TV documentaries and television debates, and was often the subject of magazine and news articles concerning ghosts and paranormal investigations.

== Biography ==
Cornell was a leading British expert in parapsychology. With his fellow researchers he attempted to record and measure paranormal events using equipment specifically made for the purpose, incorporating off-the-shelf computing and audio/visual capture devices long before the digital era. Cornell and his associates at the Society for Psychical Research pioneered the study of paranormal activities in the UK and paved the way for subsequent investigations.

Tony Cornell was born in Histon, Cambridgeshire in 1924 and educated at The Perse School and Fitzwilliam College, Cambridge, then called Fitzwilliam House, from which he graduated in 1949. Tony joined the SPR in 1952, was elected to Council in 1962 and became Vice-President in 1992. Elected Treasurer in 1980, he resigned in 2003, having held the post for 22 years. During this time he focused mainly on investigating hauntings, poltergeists and mediums. With Alan Gauld and Howard Wilkinson he created SPIDER (Spontaneous Psychological Incident Recorder). Many cases were monitored, photographically and electronically, but little significant evidence was obtained in twenty years of its use. In 1971, he visited Russian parapsychologists in Leningrad and Moscow to discuss their telepathy experiments. Mainly interested in apparitions, poltergeists and mediums, Cornell acquired a reputation for trying to get to the bottom of what was going on in a measured and unemotional way, a far cry from the current sensationalistic approach apparent in current media offerings which seem more geared towards entertainment than fact finding.

Cornell visited the property of the Enfield Poltergeist, however was critical of the investigation by Maurice Grosse and Guy Lyon Playfair. Whilst other investigators were invited to attend the property, Grosse and Playfair informed Cornell Peggy Hodgson had requested he did not, which contradicted Cornell's own experience where he stated Peggy had told him, upon leaving, he was welcome back at any time.

Cornell was a member of CUSPR (Cambridge University Society for Psychical Research) and was appointed Research Officer in 1958 and President in 1968. As the SPR Treasurer and ongoing CUSPR President, he served on the organising committee for the SPR Centenary Conference, held at Trinity College in 1982. Cornell was the author of numerous papers on ghosts and poltergeists and expressed some cautious opinions on the Scole, SORRAT Min-lab (USA) and Enfield cases. He co-authored Poltergeists with Alan Gauld (Routledge & Kegan Paul, London, 1979) and his last major work was Investigating the Paranormal (Helix Press, New York, 2002). By far his most pressing concern was the continued lack of any new knowledge gained about their cause in recent investigations, which have been conducted in an almost identical way for the last 125 years.

Cornell was also an amateur antiquarian and helped ensure the preservation of a number of old, timber-framed buildings opposite the Round Church in central Cambridge. Despite the focus of his career, Cornell's most enduring legacy may well be the Cambridge Science Park, which he proposed in the late sixties.

Cornell retired from active paranormal investigations after suffering a stroke in 2004. He died peacefully at home in the company of Martin Cornell, his middle son and Alison, his third wife, on Saturday 10 April 2010, aged 86. A memorial service was held in the chapel of Fitzwilliam College on 20 June and his ashes scattered in Histon pond during the late evening of 22 June 2010.

== Research ==
Cornell spent over 50 years investigating the paranormal and came to the conclusion that most paranormal cases turn out to have natural explanations such as the result of fraud, pranks and misidentification. He believed that many sightings of ghosts, hauntings and poltergeists are products of the human mind. Cornell estimated that of the 800 cases that he investigated, only twenty percent were difficult to explain and only a handful were paranormal.

Cornell wrote that there is no evidence for the spiritualist hypothesis and most séance room phenomena can be explained by unconscious and deliberate fraud. He wrote that discarnate spirits in trance mediumship are secondary personalities from the mediums subconscious and that all physical mediumship such as ectoplasm is the result of fraud and trickery, however, he believed psychokinesis and telepathy to be real. According to Cornell "without the presence of a living person, none of the alleged paranormal effects occur." Throughout his career as a parapsychologist Cornell exposed a number of fraudulent mediums including Rita Goold and Alec Harris. The psychologist and skeptic Richard Wiseman has noted that Cornell conducted a "great deal of fascinating work". He investigated the reliability of eyewitness testimony for ghosts by dressing up as a fake spirit in several locations in Cambridge. Cornell discovered that the eyewitness reports were often far from accurate and unreliable.

== Publications ==
- Poltergeists [with Alan Gauld] (Routledge & Kegan Paul, London, 1979)
- Investigating the Paranormal (Helix Press, New York, 2002).

== Quotes ==
I take the view that the most nonsensical aspect of much of the physical phenomena in the seance room is the implicit notion that the discarnate resort to such ludicrous, absurd, and facile physical effects to prove that there is life after death. If, as claimed, life in the next world is more advanced than that on earth, one might be forgiven to expect proof of a more intelligent type than what appears acceptable to both the dead and the living, night after night, in the seance room. The shaking of tables and banging of tambourines, the creation of cold breezes and touches, trumpets cavorting and prancing about the room banging the heads of the sitters, and all the other antics that go on in the dark say little for the proficiency of the alleged discarnate visitors. If the "spirits" have been capable of such a momentous feat as surviving bodily death transcending time and manipulating matter in this world while existing in another dimension of time and space – why do they not materialize in the seance room something really worth the effort? Tony Cornell (2002) Investigating the Paranormal.
