= Timothy Spall filmography =

Filmography of Timothy Spall

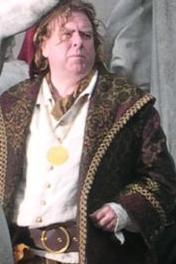
Timothy Spall filming Enchanted in New York City, March 2007

English actor Timothy Spall OBE (born 27 February 1957) has made over 100 appearances in film and television. Having made his cinematic debut in the 1979 film Quadrophenia, Spall first rose to fame for playing boring Barry Spencer Taylor in the comedy-drama Auf Wiedersehen, Pet (1983–2004), a role that won him popularity and critical praise. He has gone on to become an acclaimed Hollywood actor featuring in numerous cinematic roles, among them the starring role of Maurice Purley in Secrets & Lies (1996), for which he received nominations for a BAFTA Award for Best Actor in a Leading Role and a London Film Critics Circle Award for Actor of the Year.

== Film ==
Year	Title	Role	Notes
1978	The Life Story of Baal	Lupu	
1979	Quadrophenia	Harry the Projectionist	
1982	The Missionary	Parswell	
1982	Remembrance	Douglas	
1985	The Bride	Paulus	
1985	Dutch Girls	Lyndon Baines Jellicoe	
1986	Gothic	Dr. John William Polidori	
1987	Body Contact	Paul	
1987	Dream Demon	Peck	
1988	To Kill a Priest	Igor	
1989	Crusoe	Reverend Milne	
1990	White Hunter Black Heart	Hodkins, Bush Pilot	
1990	The Sheltering Sky	Eric Lyle	
1990	1871	Ramborde	
1990	Life Is Sweet	Aubrey, Regret Rien Owner	
1996	Secrets & Lies	Maurice Purley	
1996	Hamlet	Rosencrantz	
1998	Still Crazy	David 'Beano' Baggot	
1998	The Wisdom of Crocodiles	Inspector Healey	
1998	Neville's Island	Angus	TV film
1999	Topsy-Turvy	Richard Temple	
1999	The Clandestine Marriage	Sterling	
2000	Love's Labour's Lost	Don Armado	
2000	Vatel	Gourville	
2000	Chicken Run	Nick	Voice
2001	The Old Man Who Read Love Stories	Mayor Luis Agalla	
2001	Lucky Break	Cliff Gumbell	
2001	Vanilla Sky	Thomas Tipp	
2001	Intimacy	Andy	
2001	Rock Star	Mats	
2002	All or Nothing	Phil	
2002	Nicholas Nickleby	Charles Cheeryble	
2003	The Last Samurai	Simon Graham	
2004	Gettin' Square	Darren 'Dabba' Barrington	
2004	Lemony Snicket's A Series of Unfortunate Events	Mr. Poe	
2004	Harry Potter and the Prisoner of Azkaban	Peter Pettigrew (Wormtail)	
2005	Harry Potter and the Goblet of Fire	Peter Pettigrew (Wormtail)	
2005	Pierrepoint	Albert Pierrepoint	
2007	Death Defying Acts	Sugarman	
2007	Harry Potter and the Order of the Phoenix	Peter Pettigrew (Wormtail)	Uncredited
2007	Enchanted	Nathaniel	
2007	Sweeney Todd: The Demon Barber of Fleet Street	Beadle Bamford	
2008	Appaloosa	Phil Olson	
2009	The Damned United	Peter Taylor	
2009	Harry Potter and the Half-Blood Prince	Peter Pettigrew (Wormtail)	Cameo
2009	Heartless	George Morgan	
2009	Desert Flower	Terry Donaldson	
2009	From Time to Time	Boggis	
2010	Alice in Wonderland	Bayard the Bloodhound	Voice
2010	Wake Wood	Arthur	
2010	Jackboots on Whitehall	Winston Churchill	Voice
2010	Reuniting the Rubins	Lenny Rubins	
2010	The King's Speech	Winston Churchill	
2010	Harry Potter and the Deathly Hallows – Part 1	Peter Pettigrew (Wormtail)	
2011	Harry Potter and the Deathly Hallows – Part 2	Peter Pettigrew (Wormtail)	Archive footage
2011	My Angel	Mr. Lambert	
2012	Assassin's Bullet	Dr. Aaron Kahn	
2012	Boy	Father	Short film
2012	Comes a Bright Day	Charlie	
2012	Upside Down	Bob Boruchowitz	
2012	The Rise	D.I. West	
2012	Ginger & Rosa	Mark	
2012	Love Bite	Sid	
2014	The Love Punch	Jerry	
2014	Mr. Turner	J. M. W. Turner	
2015	Sucker	The Professor	
2016	Alice Through the Looking Glass	Bayard the Bloodhound	Voice
2016	Away	Joseph	
2016	The Journey	Ian Paisley	
2016	Denial	David Irving	
2016	Stanley a Man of Variety	16 characters	
2017	The Party	Bill	
2017	The Changeover	Carmody Braque	
2017	Finding Your Feet	Charlie	
2018	Early Man	Chief Bognar	Voice
2019	The Corrupted	Clifford Cullen	
2019	This Time Away	Nigel	Short film
2019	Mrs Lowry & Son	L S Lowry	
2020	It Snows in Benidorm	Peter Riordan	
2021	The Obscure Life of the Grand Duke of Corsica	Alfred Roth	
2021	The Last Bus	Tom	
2021	Spencer	Major Alistar Gregory	
2022	This Is Christmas	Ray	
2022	The Pale Blue Eye	Superintendent Sylvanus Thayer	
2023	Bolan's Shoes	Jimmy	
2023	Northern Comfort	Edward	
2023	Wicked Little Letters	Edward Swan	
2023	The Heist Before Christmas	Father Christmas	
2024	Rich Flu	Sebastian Snail Sr.	
2025	Hamlet	Polonius	
2025	Goodbye June	Bernie Cheshire	
2026	Virginia Woolf's Night and Day	Terence Hilbery	

== Television ==
Year	Title	Role	Notes
1981	The Cherry Orchard	Epikhodov	Television film
1981	The Three Sisters	Andrei	Television film
1982	Home Sweet Home	Gordon Leach	Television film
1982	Oliver Twist	1st Constable	Television film
1983–2004	Auf Wiedersehen, Pet	Barry Spencer Taylor	40 episodes
1987	The Nihilist's Double Vision	Nick Watts	Television film
1988	Journey's End	2nd Lt Trotter	Television film
1988	The Modern World: Ten Great Writers	Porfiry	Episode: "Fyodor Dostoyevsky's 'Crime and Punishment'"
1990	The Tale of Little Pig Robinson	Pig Robinson	Television film
1990	Stolen	Donald Caudell	2 episodes
1991	Boon	Bill Webster	Episode: "Pillow Talk"
1991	Murder Most Horrid	Pathologist	Episode "The Case of the Missingdre"
1991–92	ScreenPlay	Derek / Francis Meeks	2 episodes
1991–92	Performance	Jimmy Beales / Chico	2 episodes
1992	Red Dwarf	Andy	Episode "Back to Reality"
1992–93	The Young Indiana Jones Chronicles	Cunningham, Masseur	2 episodes
1993–94	Frank Stubbs Promotes	Frank Stubbs	13 episodes
1993	Tracey Ullman: A Class Act		Television special
1993	Without Walls	Margaret Rutherford	Episode: "For One Night Only: Margaret Rutherford"
1993	Rab C. Nesbitt	Cell Mate	Episode: "Cell"
1993	Spender	Robert Cunningham	Episode: "Retreat"
1994	Nice Day at the Office	Phil Bachelor	6 episodes
1994–96	Outside Edge	Kevin Costello	22 episodes
1997	The Hunger	Salesman	Episode: "The Swords"
1998	Neville's Island	Gordon	Television film
1998	Our Mutual Friend	Mr. Venus	4 episodes
1999	Shooting the Past	Oswald Bates	3 episodes
2000	ChuckleVision	Hot Dog Man	
2000	The Thing About Vince...	Vince Skinner	Miniseries; 3 episodes
2001	Perfect Strangers	Irving	3 episodes
2001	Ivor the Invisible	Dad	Television film
2001	Vacuuming Completely Nude in Paradise	Tommy Rag	BBC Television movie
2002	Bodily Harm	Mitchel Greenfield	2 episodes
2003	My House in Umbria	Quinty	Television film
2005	Cherished	Terry Cannings	Television film
2005	Mr. Harvey Lights a Candle	Mr. Harvey	Television film
2006	Mysterious Creatures	Bill Ainscow	Television film
2006–09	The Street	Eddie McEvoy	9 episodes
2007	A Room with a View	Mr. Emerson	Television film
2007	Oliver Twist	Fagin	Miniseries
2009	Gunrush	Doug Beckett	Television film
2009	The Fattest Man in Britain	Georgie Godwin	Television film
2010–12	Timothy Spall: ...at Sea	Himself	BBC Four miniseries
2012	The Syndicate	Bob Davies	5-part drama series
2012	Sinbad	Anicetus / Death	Episode: "Old Man of the Sea"
2012	Room on the Broom	Dragon	Voice; TV short film
2013	Gibraltar: Britain in the Sun	Narrator	Voice; Channel 5 Docu-series
2013–14	Blandings	Lord Clarence Emsworth	13 episodes
2015	The Enfield Haunting	Maurice Grosse	3 episodes
2015	Fungus the Bogeyman	Fungus	3-part series
2015	Me and My Guide Dog	Narrator	Voice; documentary film
2015	Cider with Rosie	Laurie Lee	Voice; Television film
2017	Philip K. Dick's Electric Dreams	Ed Jacobson	Episode: "The Commuter"
2019	Hatton Garden	Terry Perkins	4 episodes
2019	Summer of Rockets	Lord Arthur Wallington	Miniseries; 6 episodes
2019	Perpetual Grace, LTD	Donny	Recurring role; 5 episodes
2023	The Sixth Commandment	Peter Farquhar	4-part drama series
2024	Wolf Hall: The Mirror and the Light	Duke of Norfolk	Miniseries
2025 - 2026	Death Valley	John Chapel	Lead role

== Video games ==
Year	Title	Role	Notes
2006	Grand Theft Auto: Vice City Stories	Barry Mickelthwaite	
