= The Ghost Club =

Paranormal investigation organization

- Industry: Paranormal investigation and research
- Founded: 1862, London
- Headquarters: London, SW19
- Key people: Alan Murdie; Chair; Sarah Darnell; General Secretary; James Tacchi; Investigations Officer; Dr Robert Radakovic; Events Officer; Rosie O'Carroll; Media Officer; Mark Ottowell; Journal Editor; James Tacchi; Science & Technical Officer; Dr. Paul Foulsham; Ghost Club Webmaster & Treasurer; Gianna De Salvo- Foulsham; Membership Secretary; Nigel Bundy; Archivist
- Revenue: Non-profit
- Website: GhostClub.org.uk

The Ghost Club is a paranormal investigation and research organization, founded in London in 1862. It is believed to be the oldest such organisation in the world, though its history has not been continuous. The club still investigates mainly ghosts and hauntings.

== History ==
=== 1862 establishment ===
The club has its roots in Cambridge in 1855, where fellows at Trinity College began to discuss ghosts and psychic phenomena. Launched officially in London in 1862, it counted Charles Dickens among its members. One of the club's earliest investigations was of the Davenport brothers and their "spirit cabinet" hoax, the club challenging the Davenports' claim of contacting the dead.

The group continued to undertake practical investigations of spiritualist phenomena, a topic then in vogue, meeting to discuss ghostly subjects.

=== 1882 revitalisation ===
The club was revived on All Saints Day 1882 by the medium Stainton Moses and Alaric Alfred Watts, initially claiming to be the original founders, without acknowledging its origins. In 1882, the Society for Psychical Research (SPR), with whom there was an initial overlap, was founded at a similar time.

While the SPR was a body devoted to scientific study, the Ghost Club remained a selective and secretive organization of convinced believers for whom psychic phenomena were an established fact. Stainton Moses resigned from the vice presidency of the SPR in 1886 and thereafter devoted himself to the Ghost Club. Membership was small (82 members over 54 years) and women were not allowed, but during this period it attracted some of the most original and controversial minds in psychical research. These included Sir William Crookes Sir Oliver Lodge, Nandor Fodor and Sir Arthur Conan Doyle.

The archives of the Club reveal that the names of members, both living and dead, were solemnly recited each November 2. Each individual, living or dead, was recognized a member of the club. On more than one occasion deceased members were believed to have made their presence felt.

Also involved were the poet W. B. Yeats (joined 1911) and Frederick Bligh Bond (joined 1925), who became infamous with his investigations into spiritualism at Glastonbury. Bligh Bond later left the country and became active in the American Society for Psychical Research. He was ordained into the Old Catholic Church and re-joined the Ghost Club on his return to Britain in 1935.

The Principal of Jesus College, Cambridge, Arthur Grey, fictionalized the Ghost Club in 1919 as "The Everlasting Club" in a ghost story that many still believe to be true.

=== Early 20th century ===
The 20th century's move from séance room investigation to laboratory-based research meant the Ghost Club fell out of touch with contemporary psychic research. Harry Price, famous for his investigation into Borley Rectory, joined as a member in 1927 as did psychologist Nandor Fodor who represented the changing approach to psychical research taking place. With attendance falling, the club closed in 1936 after 485 meetings. The Ghost Club records were deposited in the British Museum under the proviso that they would remain closed until 1962 out of respect for confidentiality.

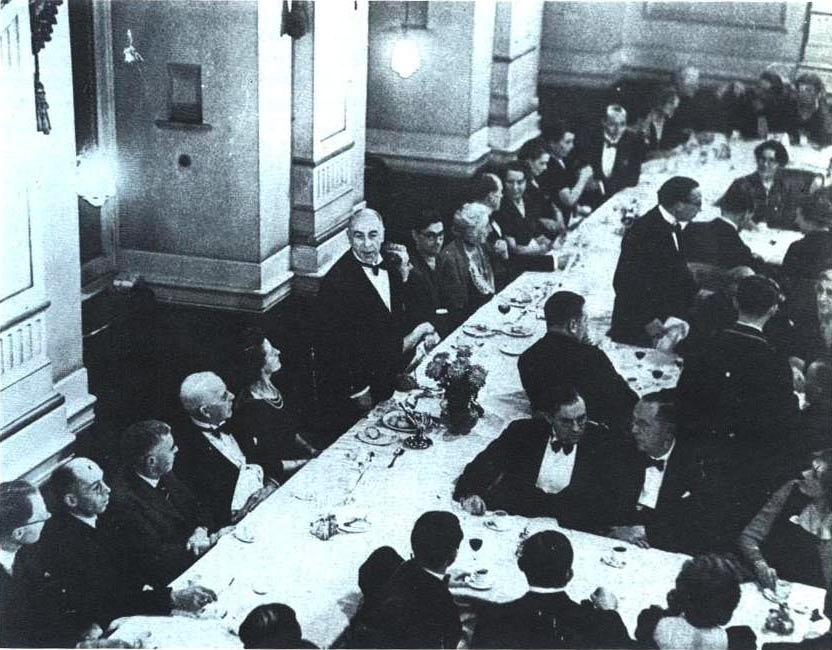
Harry Price speaking at a Ghost Club dinner in 1938

Within 18 months, Price relaunched the Ghost Club as a society dining event where psychic researchers and mediums delivered after-dinner talks. Price decided to admit women to the club, also specifying that it was not a spiritualist church or association but a group of sceptics that gathered to discuss paranormal topics. Members in this period included C. E. M. Joad, Sir Julian Huxley, Algernon Blackwood, Sir Osbert Sitwell and Lord Amwell.

Following Price's death in 1948, the club was again relaunched by members of the committee, Philip Paul and Peter Underwood. From 1962 Underwood served as president; many accounts of club activities are found in his books.

Tom Perrott joined the club in 1967 and served as chairman from 1971 to 1993.

In 1993, the club underwent a period of internal disruption, during which Underwood left to become Life President of another society he had revived called "The Ghost Club Society".

=== Recent history ===
In 1998, Perrott resigned as chairman (although he remained active in club affairs), and barrister Alan Murdie was elected as his successor. Murdie has written a number of ghost books including Haunted Brighton and regularly writes for Fortean Times. In 2005 he was succeeded by Kathy Gearing, the club's first female chairperson. Gearing announced her resignation in the club's Summer 2009 newsletter. As of May 2022, Alan Murdie was again the club chairman.

The club continues to meet monthly at a pub in central London. Several investigations are performed in England every year. In recent times, investigations have also been organised in Scotland by the club's Scottish Area Investigation Coordinator.

== Notable members ==
- Charles Dickens
- Charles Babbage
- Sir Arthur Conan Doyle
- Algernon Blackwood, CBE
- Robert Aickman
- Sir William Crookes
- Air Chief Marshal Lord Dowding
- Arthur Koestler
- C. E. M. Joad
- Donald Campbell
- Sir Julian Huxley
- Sir Osbert Sitwell
- W. B. Yeats
- Siegfried Sassoon
- Dennis Wheatley
- Peter Cushing
- Peter Underwood
- Maurice Grosse, investigator of the Enfield Poltergeist
- Colonel John Blashford-Snell, OBE
- The Reverend Lionel Fanthorpe
- Lynn Picknett
- Colin Wilson
- Geoff Holder
- Ciarán O'Keeffe
- Leo Ruickbie

== Notable investigations ==
- Borley Church
- Chingle Hall
- The Queen's House
- RAF Cosford Aerospace Museum
- Glamis Castle
- Winchester Theatre
- The Ancient Ram Inn in Wotton-under-Edge
- Woodchester Mansion
- Balgonie Castle
- Ham House
- New Lanark
- Coalhouse Fort
- Glasgow Royal Concert Hall
- Alloa Tower
- Scotland Street School Museum
- Michelham Priory
- Culross Palace
- Clerkenwell House of Detention

== Bibliography ==
The club has been mentioned in numerous books, the most notable being No Common Task (1983), This Haunted Isle (1984), The Ghosthunters Almanac (1993) and Nights in Haunted Houses (1994), all by Peter Underwood, Some Unseen Power (1985) by Philip Paul, The Encyclopedia of Ghosts and Spirits (1992) by Rosemary Ellen Guiley, Will Storr Versus the Supernatural (2006) by Will Storr, The Guide to Mysterious Glasgow (2009) by Geoff Holder, Ghost Hunting: a Survivor's Guide (2010) by John Fraser and A Brief Guide to Ghost Hunting (2013) by Dr Leo Ruickbie.
