= The Conjuring 2 =

2016 American supernatural horror film

- Theatrical release poster
- Directed by: James Wan
- Screenplay by: Chad Hayes; Carey W. Hayes; James Wan; David Leslie Johnson
- Story by: Chad Hayes; Carey W. Hayes; James Wan
- Produced by: Peter Safran; Rob Cowan; James Wan
- Starring: Vera Farmiga; Patrick Wilson; Frances O'Connor; Madison Wolfe; Simon McBurney; Franka Potente
- Cinematography: Don Burgess
- Edited by: Kirk Morri
- Music by: Joseph Bishara
- Production companies: New Line Cinema; RatPac-Dune Entertainment; Atomic Monster; The Safran Company
- Distributed by: Warner Bros. Pictures
- Release dates: June 7, 2016 (TCL Chinese Theatre); June 10, 2016 (United States)
- Running time: 134 minutes
- Country: United States
- Language: English
- Budget: $40 million
- Box office: $323 million

The Conjuring 2 (known in the United Kingdom as The Conjuring 2: The Enfield Case) is a 2016 American supernatural horror film directed by James Wan. The screenplay is by Chad Hayes, Carey W. Hayes, Wan, and David Leslie Johnson. It is the sequel to 2013's The Conjuring, the second installment in The Conjuring series, and the third installment in The Conjuring Universe franchise. Patrick Wilson and Vera Farmiga reprise their roles as paranormal investigators and authors Ed and Lorraine Warren from the first film. The film follows the Warrens as they travel to England to assist the Hodgson family, who are experiencing poltergeist activity at their Enfield council house in 1977, which later became referred to as the Enfield poltergeist.

In July 2013, before the release of the first film, it was reported that New Line Cinema was already developing a sequel with both Farmiga and Wilson signed on to reprise their roles. By October 2014, it was announced that Wan would return to direct the sequel and would make his first contribution as a writer in the franchise. Principal photography began in September 2015 in Los Angeles and concluded in December 2015 in London.

The Conjuring 2 had its world premiere at TCL Chinese Theatre on June 7, 2016, and was theatrically released in the United States on June 10, 2016, by Warner Bros. Pictures and New Line Cinema. The film received generally positive reviews from critics and grossed $323 million worldwide. A spin-off prequel, The Nun, was released in September 2018, and a sequel, The Conjuring: The Devil Made Me Do It, was released in June 2021.

== Plot ==
In 1976, paranormal investigators Ed and Lorraine Warren investigate the Amityville murders at the Amityville house, to determine if a demonic presence was truly responsible for Ronald DeFeo Jr. killing his entire family on November 13, 1974, and the subsequent haunting incident involving the Lutz family. During a seance, Lorraine is drawn into a vision where she encounters a demonic nun figure and witnesses Ed being impaled.

One year later, the Hodgson family begins to experience strange occurrences in their home in the London borough of Enfield after Janet, the second-oldest of four children, plays with a ouija board. Janet sleepwalks and converses with the entity of an angry elderly man. When the media attempts to interview the family, Janet is possessed by the elderly man, Bill Wilkins, who previously lived and died in the house. The Warrens are requested to prove whether Janet's demonic possession is a hoax. Lorraine, fearful that her vision of Ed's death may become reality, has another vision of the demonic nun in which the demon says its name. She scratches the name into her Bible in a trance.

While staying at the Hodgson residence, Ed and Lorraine consult other paranormal investigators, including Maurice Grosse and Anita Gregory, on the legitimacy of the case. Gregory presents video evidence of Janet wrecking the kitchen intentionally, thereby discrediting the haunting. Unsure of whether to believe the haunting is real or the family is lying for fame, Ed and Lorraine leave, only to soon discover that Wilkins' spirit is only a pawn being manipulated by the true demon, the nun, who is seeking to break Janet's will. Lorraine's abilities had been blocked by the nun, preventing her from grasping the truth of Janet's possession.

The couple quickly returns to the Hodgson residence and finds Janet possessed, standing at the window, ready to commit suicide. Ed grabs Janet but is close to falling. Lightning strikes the tree in the yard, turning it into the stump that impaled Ed in Lorraine's vision. Lorraine finds the Bible where she wrote the demon's name – Valak. She addresses the demon by its name, gaining dominion over it and successfully condemning it back to Hell. Janet is freed of her possession, and Lorraine pulls her and Ed to safety.

After returning home, Ed adds an item to his and Lorraine's collection – a haunted "Crooked Man" zoetrope toy owned by Peggy's youngest child – placing it beside April Perron's music box and the Annabelle doll.

== Cast ==
- Vera Farmiga as Lorraine Warren
- Patrick Wilson as Ed Warren
- Madison Wolfe as Janet Hodgson
- Frances O'Connor as Peggy Hodgson
- Lauren Esposito as Margaret Hodgson
- Benjamin Haigh as Billy Hodgson
- Patrick McAuley as Johnny Hodgson
- Simon McBurney as Maurice Grosse
- Maria Doyle Kennedy as Peggy Nottingham
- Simon Delaney as Vic Nottingham
- Franka Potente as Anita Gregory
- Bob Adrian as Bill Wilkins
- Robin Atkin Downes as the voice of Demon
- Bonnie Aarons as Demon Nun
- Javier Botet as Crooked Man
- Steve Coulter as Father Gordon
- Abhi Sinha as Harry Whitmark
- Chris Royds as Graham Morris
- Sterling Jerins as Judy Warren
- Daniel Wolfe as Kent Allen
- Annie Young as Constable Heeps
- Elliot Joseph as Constable Peterson
- Cory English as Skeptic Kaplan
- Joseph Bishara as Demon
- Shannon Kook as Drew

== Production ==
=== Development ===
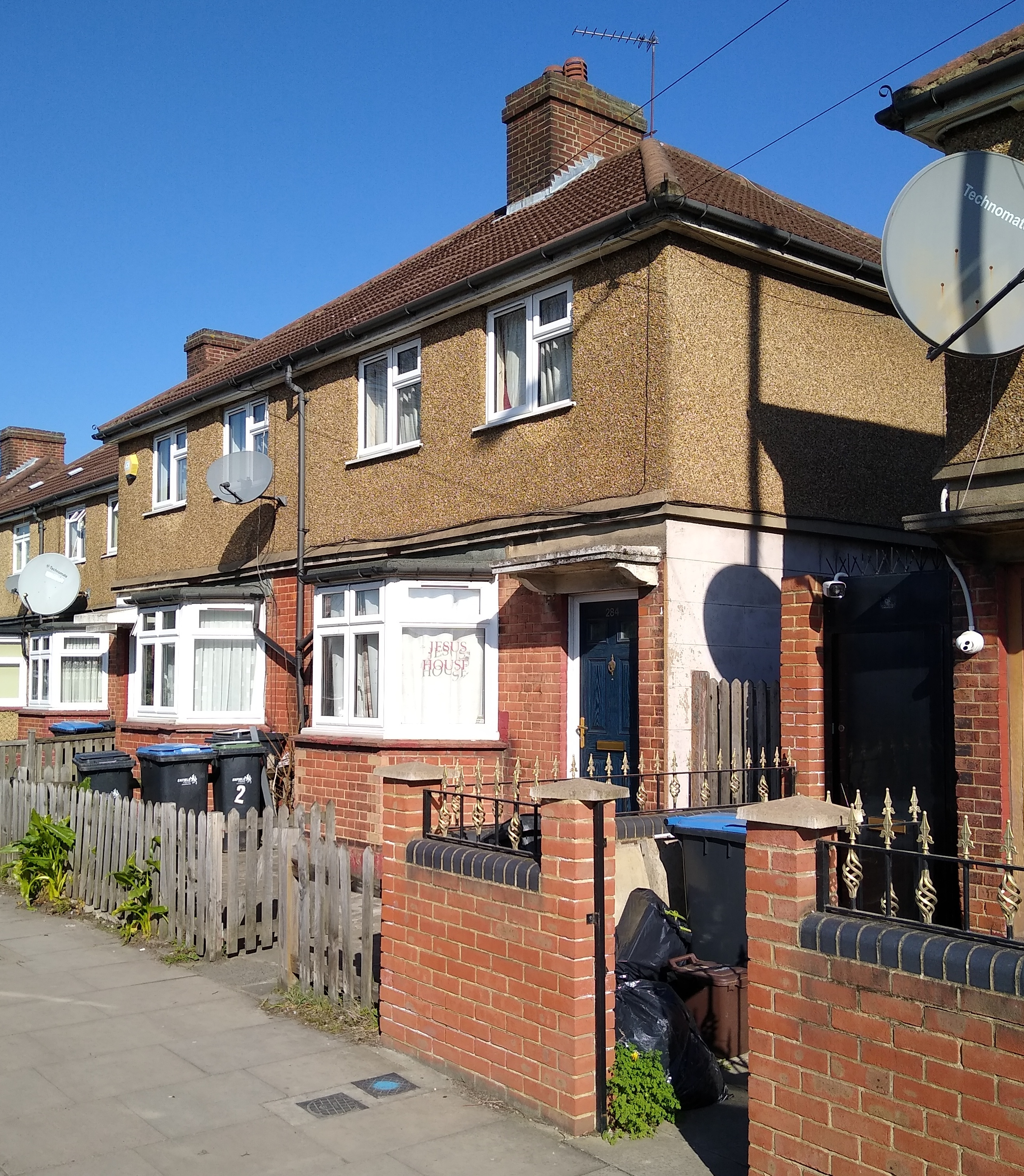
Reputed home of the Enfield poltergeist in London

In July 2013, prior to The Conjuring's release, Variety reported that New Line Cinema was already in the early stages of development of a sequel with Chad Hayes and Carey W. Hayes writing the script, following the positive test screenings and reviews of the first film. Final Destination 5 writer Eric Heisserer would later be brought in to doctor the Hayes' script, focusing mainly on dialogue. In January 2015, David Leslie Johnson was hired for rewrites. The film deals with the case of the Enfield poltergeist, which took place in the London Borough of Enfield from 1977 to 1979, and involved the alleged haunting of two sisters, aged 11 and 13, at their mother's council house. The Conjuring 2 also touches on the Warrens' most famous and most documented case, The Amityville Horror.

=== Pre-production ===
In July 2013, it was reported that Vera Farmiga and Patrick Wilson had signed on to reprise their roles from The Conjuring. This was confirmed in February 2014. On October 21, 2014, it was announced that James Wan would return to direct the sequel, and production would begin in mid-2015. Speaking to his decision to return for the sequel, Wan stated:

I've been working very heavily on the script, and the idea of continuing the saga of Ed and Lorraine Warren is actually very exciting. So the idea of going back to kind of nurture my baby that I created is part of the reason why I'm going back to do The Conjuring 2.

In early July 2015, lead actors Farmiga and Wilson visited Lorraine Warren at the New England Paranormal Research Center in Connecticut in preparation for their roles. On July 28, 2015, Wan officially began pre-production for the film. In August 2015, the film was granted $5.6 million in tax credits from the California Film Commission for bringing the production to the state.

On September 13, 2015, Don Burgess was confirmed as the film's director of photography. In September 2015, Frances O'Connor, Simon McBurney, newcomer Lauren Esposito, and Madison Wolfe joined the cast. Franka Potente, Simon Delaney, Maria Doyle Kennedy, and newcomers Patrick McAuley and Benjamin Haigh were also reported to have been cast in late September 2015. In November 2015, it was announced that Abhi Sinha had joined the cast of the film. On December 1, 2015, it was confirmed that Sterling Jerins would reprise her role as the Warrens' daughter Judy.

=== Filming ===
Principal photography for The Conjuring 2 began on September 21, 2015, in Los Angeles, California. Due to an inexplicable series of events during production of the first film, a priest from the Roman Catholic Archdiocese of Santa Fe was brought in to bless the set of the sequel by the film's producers. Production moved to London on November 18, 2015, with filming taking place in and around The Warrington, a pub in the residential district of Maida Vale. On November 22, filming took place at Marylebone station. Filming concluded on December 1, 2015. Production lasted for 50 days, with 40 days filming on sound stages at Warner Bros. Studios, Burbank, and 10 days on location in London. Additional photography began in March 2016 to reinvent the film's antagonist, who was initially a "demonic figure with wings". Wan felt the design did not fit and instead opted to change the demon to a nun, with Bonnie Aarons cast in the role, to make the film more grounded.

== Music ==
The original musical score for The Conjuring 2 was written by Joseph Bishara and was released on June 3, 2016, by WaterTower Music. Bishara, a recurring collaborator of director James Wan, composed the score after having previously written the music for The Conjuring and the Insidious film series. Lead actor Patrick Wilson performs Elvis Presley's "Can't Help Falling in Love" on a guitar in the film, while songs such as the Clash's "London Calling", the Bee Gees' "I Started a Joke" and the traditional nursery rhymes "This Old Man" and "There Was a Crooked Man" are also featured. Composer Mark Isham's family themes from the first film, "Photograph" and "Happy Family", were also used in The Conjuring 2.

== Distribution ==
=== Theatrical ===
The Conjuring 2 was originally scheduled to be released on October 23, 2015, but in October 2014, Warner Bros. pulled the film from the schedule and set the film for an unspecified 2016 release date. In November 2014, the release date was pushed back from its original release date of October 23, 2015, to June 10, 2016. The Conjuring 2 had its red carpet world premiere at the TCL Chinese Theatre on June 7, 2016, as part of the Los Angeles Film Festival's program, three days prior to its wide release.

On June 17, 2016, a 65-year-old man died of a heart attack while watching the film at a cinema in Tiruvannamalai, Tamil Nadu, India.

=== Home media ===
The Conjuring 2 was released as a digital download on August 30, 2016, and on DVD and Blu-ray on September 13, 2016. Bonus features include behind the scenes footage, featurettes, and deleted scenes.

== Reception ==
=== Box office ===
The Conjuring 2 grossed $103 million in the United States and Canada and $220 million in other territories for a worldwide total gross of $323 million. Although it earned less in North America than the first film, it fared better internationally; overall, it made 0.5% more than the first film. The film was the highest-grossing horror film of the year and the second-highest-grossing horror film overall of all time, behind only 1973's The Exorcist ($441.3 million). It was partly credited for the success of fellow Warner Bros. horror film Lights Out, which was released a month later. Deadline Hollywood calculated the net profit of the film to be $98.3 million, when factoring together all expenses and revenues for the film, making it the 14th-most profitable release of 2016.

In North America, the film opened on June 10, 2016, alongside Warcraft and Now You See Me 2, and was projected to gross $35 to 40 million from 3,343 theaters in its opening weekend. The film grossed $3.4 million from its Thursday night previews, besting the $3.3 million made by its predecessor, and $16.4 million in its first day. In its opening weekend, the film grossed $40.4 million from 3,434 theaters (almost matching its predecessor's $41.9 million opening), making it the biggest opening for a horror film since the original film in 2013, the biggest-ever for the month of June (breaking The Purge's record), and the fifth-biggest for a horror film of all time, behind the first film, Paranormal Activity 2 and Paranormal Activity 3 ($40.6 million and $52.5 million, respectively), and the 2009 remake of Friday the 13th ($40.6 million). Following a first-place finish in its first weekend of release, the film faced a steep decline of 63.2% in its second weekend (earning $14.8 million from 3,356 theaters); this was a much larger drop than The Conjuring (46.9%) and Annabelle (57.3%). As a result, it slipped to third place behind newcomers Finding Dory and Central Intelligence, another film from New Line Cinema. It began to lose a considerable number of theaters by its third weekend as a result of numerous newly released films. Forbes magazine noted that The Conjuring 2 was falling faster than the previous film but had already made more than Insidious: Chapter 2, Annabelle, and both The Purge and The Purge: Anarchy had done at that point in their releases. Unlike its predecessor, The Conjuring 2 proved to be more front-loaded, earning 2.5 times its opening weekend, compared to the original film earning 3.22 times its debut number.

Outside North America, the film has been released across 60 countries. It played well in Latin America and performed exceptionally well in other Catholic countries due to its spiritual themes while it also did well in the UK, where the film is set. It was released across 44 countries the same weekend as its United States release, and grossed $51.5 million in its opening weekend from 10,400 screens, debuting in second place behind Warcraft. It added another $43.1 million in its second weekend from a total of 57 countries as well as passing the $100 million threshold. However, it still remained in second place at the international box office, behind then-newcomer Finding Dory.

It recorded the biggest opening day of all time for a horror film in 24 markets, including Mexico ($1.6 million), Brazil ($735,000), Australia ($401,000), and all of Latin America. Moreover, in terms of opening weekend, the film scored the biggest opening for a horror film in 26 markets, including Mexico ($9 million), Brazil ($4.1 million), and Australia ($3 million). In Argentina, the film scored the second-biggest opening for Warner Bros. with $2.85 million, behind only Batman v Superman: Dawn of Justice. In South Korea, the film opened to $4 million, France to $3.7 million, Spain to $1.85 million, Russia to $1.75 million, and Italy to $1.1 million. The film faced stiff competition against Central Intelligence in Germany, making $2.1 million in its opening weekend, placing second behind the aforementioned film. In the United Kingdom, the film earned an opening weekend of £4.6 million ($6.8 million) from 504 theaters, over twice its predecessor's opening ($3.3 million). In terms of total earnings, its biggest markets outside of North America were in Mexico ($20.3 million), the United Kingdom ($15.3 million), South Korea ($11.5 million) and India ($11.5 million). It has become the highest-grossing Warner Bros. film in Chile with a total gross of $5.4 million.

=== Critical response ===
On the review aggregator website Rotten Tomatoes, 80% of 253 critics' reviews are positive, with an average rating of 6.8/10. The website's consensus reads: "The Conjuring 2 can't help but lose a bit of its predecessor's chilly sting through familiarity, but what remains is still a superior ghost story told with spine-tingling skill." Metacritic, which uses a weighted average, assigned the film a score of 65 out of 100, based on 38 critics, indicating "generally favorable" reviews. Audiences polled by CinemaScore gave the film an average grade of A− on an A+ to F scale, the same score earned by its predecessor.

In her review for The Hollywood Reporter, Sheri Linden praised the film, saying, "Three years after The Conjuring rattled the multiplex with old-school horror, director James Wan ups the ante with an excellent sequel." Owen Gleiberman of Variety gave the film a mixed review, writing, "On one level, The Conjuring 2 is just a not-bad megaplex funhouse movie, no more and no less, but on another level it offers its potential fans a helping of reassurance to go along with the fear. If there are ghost demons out there, then God must be out there as well. Audiences, it was long ago proven, will pay to see both." TheWrap's Alonso Duralde gave the film a positive review, stating, "Frightening rarely strikes twice in the same place, despite the efforts of so many horror sequels, but even if The Conjuring 2 doesn't deliver the delightful jolts of its predecessor, it maintains a consistent chill throughout, with a slow and steady dread that creeps up on you over time."

In a mixed review, Chris Nashawaty of Entertainment Weekly gave the film a B−, writing, "There are some solid scares (Wan is too gifted in the dark art of gotcha manipulation to not make you leap a few times), but there's nothing on par with the first film's brilliant hide-and-clap scene with Lili Taylor." Jacob Wilkins of The Cavalier Daily lauded the film, calling Wan a "master of horror" and remarked that the film was "fresh, original and unsettling". Pete Hammond of Deadline.com wrote that he was "pleasantly surprised" by the sequel and what Wan has accomplished with the film, stating, "Wan knows the tricks of this trade (heightened sound effects, moving furniture, dark corners) but somehow miraculously he really puts a fresh spin on it all here. It's riveting stuff, even if in a familiar cinematic environment." He added, "It is one hell of a movie."

=== Accolades ===
Year	Award	Category	Nominee(s)	Result	Ref.
2016	Golden Trailer Awards	Best Horror	"Close" – The Conjuring 2	Nominated	
2016	Golden Trailer Awards	Best Horror TV Spot	"Close" – The Conjuring 2	Won	
2017	Empire Awards	Best Horror	The Conjuring 2	Nominated	
2017	People's Choice Awards	Favorite Thriller Movie	The Conjuring 2	Nominated	
2017	Saturn Awards	Best Horror Film	The Conjuring 2	Nominated	

== Future ==
=== Sequel ===
Wan stated on further potential sequels, "There could be many more [Conjuring] movies because the Warrens have so many stories". Screenwriters Chad and Carey Hayes also expressed interest in working on a story for another sequel. However, Wan stated that he may have been unable to direct the film due to his commitments to other projects. He said to Collider, "Assuming we are lucky enough to have a third chapter, there are other filmmakers that I would love to sort of continue on the Conjuring world, if we are lucky enough". Wan also noted that, if a third film were to be made, it would ideally take place in the 1980s. Wan later stated that the sequel could have included lycanthropy, "Maybe we can go and do it like a classic American Werewolf in London style. That would be awesome! The Warrens set against the backdrop of The Hound of Baskerville". In May 2017, Safran said it would be unlikely that a third installment would be a "haunted house" film. In June 2017, it was announced a third installment was in development, with The Conjuring 2 co-writer David Leslie Johnson hired to write the screenplay. In August 2017, Wan told Entertainment Weekly that the filmmakers had "been working hard on The Conjuring 3", and that "we're in the midst of working on the script, and still hashing [it] out. We want to make sure that the script is in a really good place. With how much people have loved the first two [Conjuring films], I don't want to rush in to the third one if possible." By September of the following year, producer Peter Safran stated that the script was near completion and that production would begin sometime during 2019. In October 2018, Wan selected Michael Chaves to direct the film.

== Spin-off films ==
=== The Nun ===
On June 15, 2016, it was reported that a spin-off film titled The Nun, focusing on the "Demon Nun" character Valak, was in development with Johnson writing the script. Safran and Wan would produce. Corin Hardy was hired to direct the film, with a screenplay by Wan and Gary Dauberman. It was released on September 7, 2018, with Demián Bichir and Taissa Farmiga cast in the lead roles. Bonnie Aarons reprised her role as Valak in the film, and Charlotte Hope, Jonas Bloquet, and Ingrid Bisu co-starred. Filming began in May 2017 in Bucharest, Romania.

=== Possible The Crooked Man film ===
On May 31, 2017, Peter Safran said there was a possibility of a Crooked Man film. On June 14, 2017, it was reported that a spin-off film titled The Crooked Man, featuring the character depicted in The Conjuring 2, was in development, with Mike Van Waes writing the screenplay from a story by James Wan, with Safran and Wan set to produce the project.

In November 2022, Wan announced that, outside of his control, the Crooked Man project would not be moving forward at that time while expressing hope for a potential future release.

== See also ==
- List of horror films
  - List of horror films of 2016
  - List of films based on the Amityville haunting
- The Enfield Haunting, a 2015 horror miniseries based on the same case, The Enfield Poltergeist
