= I. S. O. Playfair =

British Army officer (1894–1972)

Major-General I. S. O. Playfair CB DSO MC*
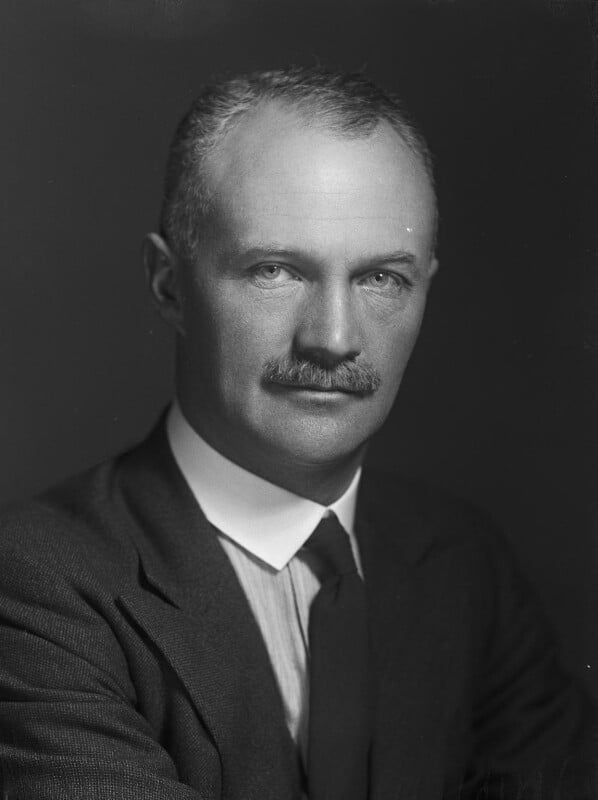
- Playfair in 1934
- Born: 10 April 1894
- Died: 21 March 1972 (aged 77)
- Relatives: Jocelyn Malan (wife)
- Military career
- Allegiance: United Kingdom
- Branch: British Army
- Service years: 1913–1947
- Rank: Major-General
- Service number: 8171
- Unit: Royal Engineers
- Commands: Army Gas School
- Conflicts: First World War; Second World War
- Awards: Companion of the Order of the Bath; Distinguished Service Order; Military Cross & Bar; Mentioned in Despatches
- Other work: Author

Major-General Ian Stanley Ord Playfair, CB, DSO, MC & Bar (10 April 1894 – 21 March 1972) was a British Army officer and military historian.

== Military career ==
Born the son of Colonel F.H.G. Playfair of the Hampshire Regiment and educated at Cheltenham College, Playfair joined the Royal Engineers in 1913. He served in France and Belgium during the First World War and was mentioned in despatches, awarded the Military Cross and Bar and the Distinguished Service Order.

Playfair became officer commanding the Gentlemen Cadets of the Royal Marine Artillery in 1920, attended the Staff College, Camberley, from 1929 to 1930, was chief instructor in field works and bridging at the Royal School of Military Engineering in 1930 and an instructor at the Indian Army Staff College in Quetta in 1934. After attending the Imperial Defence College in 1938, he became commandant of the Army Gas School in Wiltshire in 1939.

In 1940, following the outbreak of the Second World War, Playfair was appointed director of plans at the War Office. In early 1942, he was appointed deputy commander (and chief of staff) of land forces in the American-British-Dutch-Australian Command (ABDACOM), a short-lived, supreme command for Allied forces in Southeast Asia and the southwest Pacific. In 1943, Playfair was appointed to the general staff of the 11th Army Group, in the South East Asia Command.

Playfair retired in 1947. He later wrote several books, and was co-author of a Second World War official campaign history: The Mediterranean and Middle East.

== Family ==
In 1930, Playfair married Jocelyn Malan; they had two sons, including Guy Lyon Playfair.

== Works ==
- The Mediterranean and Middle East
  - Volume 1: The Early Successes Against Italy, to May 1941, 1954, ISBN 1-84574-065-3
  - Volume 2: The Germans Come to the Help of Their Ally, 1941, 1956, ISBN 1-84574-066-1
  - Volume 3: British Fortunes Reach Their Lowest Ebb, 1960, ISBN 1-84574-067-X
  - Volume 4: The Destruction of the Axis Forces in Africa, 1966, ISBN 1-84574-068-8

== Bibliography ==
- Smart, Nick (2005). Biographical Dictionary of British Generals of the Second World War. Barnesley: Pen & Sword. ISBN 1844150496.
