= The Enfield Haunting =

- Genre: Drama; Thriller
- Written by: Joshua St Johnston
- Directed by: Kristoffer Nyholm
- Starring: Timothy Spall; Eleanor Worthington Cox; Juliet Stevenson; Matthew Macfadyen; Rosie Cavaliero; Fern Deacon; Simon Chandler; Sean Francis
- Country of origin: United Kingdom
- Original language: English
- No. of series: 1
- No. of episodes: 3

Production
- Executive producers: Jamie Campbell; Joel Wilson
- Producers: Adrian Sturges; Kirsten Eller
- Running time: 51 minutes (including adverts)
- Production company: Eleven Film

Original release
- Network: Sky Living
- Release: 3 May – 17 May 2015

The Enfield Haunting is a British drama horror series commissioned by Sky Living that first aired on 3 May 2015. Kristoffer Nyholm, who rose to fame after the hugely popular Danish series, The Killing, directed the three-parter.

The series is based on Guy Lyon Playfair’s book, This House Is Haunted and is about a series of bizarre events around the phenomena collectively known as the "Enfield Poltergeist" that took place at a council house from August 1977 to 1979.

The drama draws upon recordings and witness statements to draw the audience in to the unfolding supernatural events. The series finished on 17 May 2015 after the third and last episode aired.

== Characters ==
Matthew Macfadyen played Guy Lyon Playfair, an experienced but sceptical investigator, while Timothy Spall played Maurice Grosse, an amateur paranormal researcher. BAFTA-nominated Juliet Stevenson also joined the cast to play Maurice’s wife Betty Grosse in the series.

== Cast and characters ==
- Timothy Spall as Maurice Grosse
- Juliet Stevenson as Betty Grosse
- Matthew Macfadyen as Guy Lyon Playfair
- Rosie Cavaliero as Peggy Hodgson
- Eleanor Worthington Cox as Janet Hodgson
- Fern Deacon as Margaret Hodgson
- Simon Chandler as John Beloff
- Sean Francis as Ray
- Charles Furness as Simon
- Martin Hancock as Tony
- Amanda Lawrence as Lindy Crane
- Neal Barry as John
- Sudha Bhuchar as Head of Psychiatry
- Nigel Boyle as Graham Morris
- Myah Bristow as Girl Patient
- Karen Lewis as Dr. Anita Gregory
- Peter McCabe as Alan Crane
- Tommy McDonnell as Doug Bence
- Steven O'Neill as Psychiatric Doctor
- Susannah Wise as Sylvie
- Ron Hedley as Terry

== Ratings ==
The three episodes were the highest-rated programmes on Sky Living. Previously, the highest-rated episode of a Sky Living programme was the sixth episode of the first series of The Blacklist called "Gina Zanetakos" which aired on 8 October 2013 and garnered 1,197,000 viewers. That record was shattered by the first episode of The Enfield Haunting, which aired on 3 May 2015, and garnered 1,871,000 viewers. The second episode, which aired on 10 May 2015, garnered 1,302,000 viewers, and the third and final episode, which aired on 17 May 2015, garnered 1,262,000 viewers.

== Reviews ==
Michael Hogan writing for The Telegraph gave The Enfield Haunting four stars out of five saying "This Seventies-set chiller was scarily compelling". while Ellen E Jones writing for The Independent called it "North London meets The Exorcist in eerie suburban drama" while Grace Dent writing for the same paper wrote, "The Enfield Haunting's poltergeist was about as scary as a drunk uncle" while Julia Raeside writing for The Guardian said, "This supernatural account of the famous 1970s London poltergeist is packed with genuine thrills and superb performances from a young cast."

== Broadcast ==
The show was broadcast in Canada and the United States on A&E. It is also available as a streaming video on Shomi. The three episodes were also broadcast in France and Germany on the public Franco-German TV network Arte.

== See also ==
- The Conjuring 2, a 2016 horror film based on a highly fictionalised version of the same event, The Enfield Poltergeist
