= C. C. L. Gregory =

British astronomer

C.C.L. Gregory
- Born: Christopher Clive Langton Gregory; 13 May 1892; Parkstone, Dorset, England
- Died: 24 November 1964 (aged 72); Crookham-with-Ewshott, Hampshire, England
- Occupation: Astronomer
- Spouses: Helen Patricia; Anita Kohsen (m. 1954)
- Children: Richard Gregory

Christopher Clive Langton Gregory (13 May 1892 – 24 November 1964) was a British astronomer, who established the University of London Observatory. He was born in Parkstone, Dorset and lived in Swanage, Dorset in 1911 and in Hendon, Middlesex in 1939. He died in Crookham-with-Ewshott, Hampshire.

Gregory's son by his first wife, Helen Patricia (née Gibson), was psychologist Richard Gregory (1923–2010). His second wife was Anita Gregory (née Kohsen).

The National Portrait Gallery has a photograph of Gregory taken in 1939.
