= Richard Gregory =

British psychologist (1923–2010)

Richard Gregory CBE, FRS, FRSE
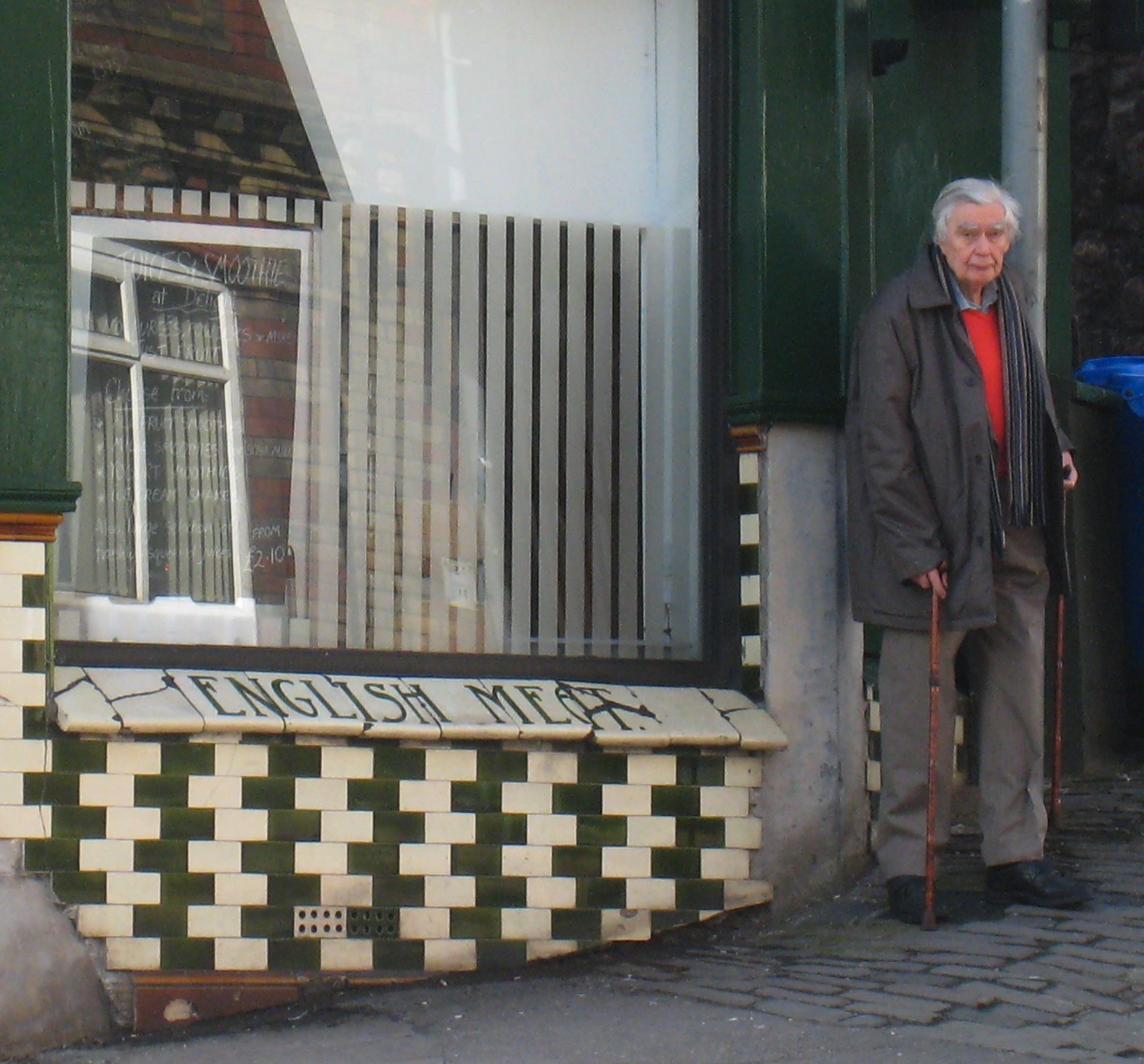
- Gregory outside the café on St Michael's Hill, Bristol, which inspired his (re-)discovery of the "café wall illusion", February 2010
- Born: Richard Langton Gregory; 24 July 1923; London, England
- Died: 17 May 2010 (aged 86); Bristol, England
- Spouses: Margaret Hope Pattison Muir (m. 1953; div. 1966) Freja Mary Balchin (m. 1967; div. 1976)
- Partner: Priscilla Heard
- Children: 2
- Awards: Michael Faraday Prize (1992)
- Scientific career
- Fields: Psychology, neuropsychology
- Workplaces: University of Bristol
- Website: richardgregory.org

Richard Langton Gregory (24 July 1923 – 17 May 2010) was a British psychologist and Professor of Neuropsychology at the University of Bristol.

== Life and career ==
Richard Gregory was born in London. He was the son of C. C. L. Gregory, the first director of the University of London Observatory, and his first wife, Helen Patricia (née Gibson).

Gregory served with the Royal Air Force's Signals branch during World War II, and after the war earned an RAF scholarship to Downing College, Cambridge. He was made an Honorary Fellow of Downing in 1999.

In 1967, with Prof. Donald Michie and Prof. Christopher Longuet-Higgins, he founded the Department of Machine Intelligence and Perception, a forerunner of the Department of Artificial Intelligence, at the University of Edinburgh. He was Head of the Bionics Research Laboratory, Professor of Bionics, and Department Chairman 1968–70. Gregory was founding editor of the journal Perception (1972), which emphasized phenomenology and novel percepts produced by new stimuli. He was a founding member of the Experimental Psychology Society and served as its president in 1981–1982.

He collaborated with W. E. Hick for the latter's influential paper "On the rate of gain of information". He commented: "I was the only subject for his gain of information experiment to complete the course, as he was the only other subject and he packed it in when the apparatus fell apart."

In 1981, he founded The Exploratory, a hands-on science centre in Bristol, the first of its kind in the UK. In 1989, he was appointed Osher Visiting Fellow of the Exploratorium, a similar scientific education centre in San Francisco, California.

Gregory has called Hermann von Helmholtz one of his major inspirations.

He appeared on, or was an advisor to, numerous science-related television programmes in the UK and worldwide. His particular interest was in optical illusions and what these revealed about human perception. He wrote and edited several books, notably Eye and Brain and Mind in Science. One of his hobbies was punning (making puns). In April 1993, he was the guest for BBC Radio 4's Desert Island Discs, where his favourite choice was Beethoven's Piano Sonata No. 30.

Having suffered a stroke a few days earlier, he died on 17 May 2010 at the Bristol Royal Infirmary, surrounded by family and friends.

=== Lectures ===
In 1967, he delivered the Royal Institution Christmas Lectures on The Intelligent Eye.

== Contribution ==
Gregory's main contribution to the discipline was in the development of cognitive psychology, in particular that of "Perception as hypotheses", an approach which had its origin in the work of Hermann von Helmholtz (1821–1894) and his student Wilhelm Wundt (1832–1920). Between them, the two Germans laid the basis of investigating how the senses work, especially sight and hearing.

According to Gregory, Helmholtz should take the credit for realising that perception is not just a passive acceptance of stimuli, but an active process involving memory and other internal processes.

Gregory progressed this idea with a key analogy. The process whereby the brain puts together a coherent view of the outside world is analogous to the way in which the sciences build up their picture of the world, by a kind of hypothetico-deductive process. Although this takes place on a quite different time-scale, and inside one head instead of a community, nevertheless, according to Gregory, perception shares many traits with scientific method. A series of works by Gregory developed this idea in some detail.

Kanizsa triangle showing illusory contours

Gregory's ideas ran counter to those of the American direct realist psychologist J. J. Gibson, whose 1950 The Perception of the Visual World was dominant when Gregory was a younger man. Much in Gregory's work can be seen as a reply to Gibson's ideas, and as the incorporation of explicitly Bayesian concepts into the understanding of how sensory evidence is combined with pre-existing ("prior") beliefs. Gregory argued that optical illusions, such as the illusory contours in the Kanizsa triangle, demonstrated the Bayesian processing of perceptual information by the brain.

== Works ==
- Recovery from Early Blindness: A Case Study (1963), with Jean Wallace. Experimental Psychology Society. Monograph. No.2. Cambridge: Heffers.
- Eye and Brain: The Psychology of Seeing (1966), London: Weidenfeld and Nicolson. [in twelve languages]. Second Edition (1972). Third Edition (1977). Fourth Edition (1990). USA: Princeton University Press; (1994) Oxford: Oxford University Press. Fifth Edition (1997) Oxford University Press and (1998) Princeton University Press.
- The Intelligent Eye (1970), London: Weidenfeld and Nicolson. [in 6 languages].
- Illusion in Nature and Art (1973), (ed. with Sir Ernst Gombrich), London: Duckworth.
- Concepts and Mechanisms of Perception (1974), London: Duckworth. [collected papers].
- Mind in Science: A History of Explanations of Psychology and Physics (1981), London: Weidenfeld and Nicolson; USA: CUP. Paperback, Peregrine (1984). (Macmillan Scientific Book Club choice). Transl. Italian, La Mente nella Scienze, Mondadori (1985).
- Odd Perceptions [essays] (1986), London: Methuen. Paperback (1988) Routledge. (2nd edition 1990–91).
- Creative Intelligences (1987), (ed. with Pauline Marstrand), London: Frances Pinter. ISBN 0-86187-673-3.
- Oxford Companion to the Mind (1987), (ed., with Zangwill, O.), Oxford: OUP. [translated into Italian, French, Spanish. In TSP Softbacks, and other Book Clubs]. (Paperback 1998).
- Evolution of the Eye and Visual System (1992), (ed. with John R. Cronly-Dillon), vol. 2 of Vision and Visual Dysfunction. London: Macmillan.
- Even Odder Perceptions (1994), [essays]. London: Routledge.
- The Artful Eye (1995), (ed. with J. Harris, P. Heard and D. Rose). Oxford: OUP
- Mirrors in Mind (1997), Oxford: W. H. Freeman/Spektrum. (1998) Penguin.
- The Mind Makers (1998), London: Weidenfeld and Nicolson.
- Seeing Through Illusions (2009), OUP.
- Main journal publications at http://www.richardgregory.org/

== Degrees ==
Year	Degree
1950	M.A. (Cantab)
1983	D.Sc. (Bristol)

== Honorary degrees ==
Year	Honorary degree
1990	D. Univ. (Open); D. Univ. (Stirling)
1993	LL.D (Bristol)
1996	D.Sc. (East Anglia); D.Sc. (Exon)
1998	D.Univ. (York); D.Sc. (U.M.I.S.T.)
1999	D.Sc. (Keele)
2000	D.Sc. (Edinburgh)

== Personal life ==
In 1953, Gregory married Margaret Hope Pattison Muir, by whom he had a son and a daughter. The marriage was dissolved in 1966. In 1967, he married Freja Mary Balchin, the daughter of writers Elizabeth and Nigel Balchin. This marriage was also dissolved in 1976. Gregory was survived by two children (Mark and Romilly Gregory), two grandchildren (Luutsche Ozinga and Kiran Rogers), and his long-term companion, Priscilla Heard.

== See also ==
- Recovery from blindness#Sidney Bradford
- Optical illusion
- Hollow-Face illusion
- Café wall illusion
