= Guy Lyon Playfair =

British writer

- Born: 5 April 1935; Quetta, India
- Died: 8 April 2018 (aged 83); London, England
- Occupations: Parapsychologist, author
- Writing career
- Period: Contemporary
- Genres: Non-fiction, biography
- Subject: Parapsychology

Guy Lyon Playfair (5 April 1935 – 8 April 2018) was a British writer, best known for his books about parapsychology and his investigation of the Enfield poltergeist.

== Early life and work ==
Born in Quetta, British India, he was one of two sons of British Army officer and writer I. S. O. Playfair and novelist Jocelyn Malan. He was educated in England and studied modern languages at the University of Cambridge. After completing National Service as a translator with the Royal Air Force in Iraq, he pursued a career in journalism and working for Life magazine. In the early 1960s he moved to Rio de Janeiro where he worked for the next 10 years as a freelance journalist for a number of international business magazines, The Economist, Time, The Guardian and Associated Press. He also served for four years with the press corps of the US Agency for International Development.

It was in Brazil that he first became interested in the paranormal, following direct experience with a psychic healer. In 1973 he investigated a poltergeist outbreak in a private apartment in São Paulo, and joined the Society for Psychical Research the same year. He was elected to its council in 2004.

In his first book, The Flying Cow, on the subject of Brazilian paranormal phenomena, including events connected with Francisco Candido 'Chico' Xavier and Zé Arigó was published in 1975. His second book The Indefinite Boundary, was published in 1976. He then famously investigated the Enfield poltergeist case in 1977.

== Enfield poltergeist ==
Playfair is most famous for his endorsement of the Enfield poltergeist. He investigated the case alongside the inventor Maurice Grosse in 1977. Although Playfair maintained the haunting was genuine and wrote in his later book This House Is Haunted: The True Story of a Poltergeist (1980) that an "entity" was to blame for the Enfield disturbances, he often doubted the children's veracity and wondered if they were playing tricks and exaggerating. Still, Grosse and Playfair believed that even though some of the alleged poltergeist activity was faked by the girls, other incidents were genuine. Playfair's belief that poltergeists are disembodied, mischievous spirits influenced the paranormal research of Colin Wilson.

The sceptical investigator Joe Nickell has written "As a magician experienced in the dynamics of trickery, I have carefully examined Playfair's lengthy account of the disturbances at Enfield and have concluded that they are best explained as children's pranks."

The American demonologists Ed and Lorraine Warren also visited the Enfield house in 1978. Playfair claimed that the Warrens did not truly investigate the case, and expressed frustration with the 2016 film The Conjuring 2 which dramatises the Enfield case and, according to Playfair, greatly exaggerates the Warrens' involvement. Despite his involvement in the case, Playfair does not feature as a character in the film.

== Later life ==
As well as investigating other cases of poltergeists and hauntings he also conducted experiments with mediums and investigated claims of psychokinesis and metal-bending. Playfair was described as a "devoted believer in Uri Geller" and collaborated with him on the 1986 book The Geller Effect. He was a "psychic consultant" for the infamous BBC production Ghostwatch which aired on Halloween night 1992 on BBC One in the United Kingdom.

He was also particularly interested in cases of telepathy between identical twins, publishing the book Twin Telepathy: the Psychic Connection in 2002.

He was active in psychical research until shortly before his death on 8 April 2018.

== Reception ==
Playfair's book The Flying Cow expressed his admiration for the Brazilian medium Chico Xavier. A review in the New Scientist wrote "Many books misuse science to gull the reader (and, perhaps the author as well, and The Flying Cow is just one more)". The science writer Martin Gardner criticised Playfair's endorsement of Geller and described him as a "hack writer on the occult".

The magician Ben Harris, author of the book Gellerism Revealed: The Psychology and Methodology Behind the Geller Effect, shows step-by-step photographs and explains the process bending keys and cutlery by trick methods. In reviewing Playfair and Geller's book, Harris concluded Playfair was not an experienced observer of sleight of hand and was fooled by Geller's tricks. According to Harris "Mr Playfair turns out to be a weak observer due to his own misplaced confidence in his abilities as an observer ... [he] rushes along crucifying the skeptics, the magicians and almost anyone who has questioned the Geller myth."

In a review for The Geller Effect the parapsychologist Michael Goss wrote "Playfair provides little evidence to support the existence of paranormal powers. His main theory boils down to the fact that, because so many people imitate spoonbending, someone with real paranormal abilities must have started it off." Richard Whittington-Egan in a review for Playfair's book This House is Haunted wrote "a shade credulous in some areas, but its value as a most capable scrutiny of a classic modern haunting makes it an indispensable addition to the relatively sparse literature of full-scale poltergeist investigation in the field."

== Selected bibliography ==
- The Flying Cow: Research into Paranormal Phenomena in the World's Most Psychic Country. Souvenir Press, 1975, ISBN 9780285621602
- The Unknown Power: Research into Paranormal Phenomena in the World’s Most Psychic Country. Panther Books, St. Albans 1977, ISBN 0-586-04235-0 (reissue of The Flying Cow)
- The Indefinite Boundary. Panther Books, 1977, ISBN 0-586-04638-0
- with Scott Hill: The Cycles of Heaven: Cosmic Forces and What They Are Doing to You. St. Martin’s Press, New York 1978
- This House Is Haunted: The Investigation of the Enfield Poltergeist. Stein & Day, 1980, ISBN 0-8128-2732-5
- The Haunted Pub Guide. 1985, ISBN 0-245-54255-8
- If This Be Magic. Jonathan Cape, 1985, ISBN 0-224-02338-1 and ISBN 978-0-224-02338-2
- with Uri Geller: The Geller Effect. Grafton, Jonathan Cape, Hunter Publishing, ISBN 0-586-07430-9 ISBN 978-0586074305
- Twin Telepathy: the Psychic Connection, Vega, 2002, ISBN 1-84333-686-3
- New Clothes for Old Souls: World Wide Evidence for Reincarnation. Druze Heritage Foundation, 2006, ISBN 1-904850-09-X and ISBN 978-1-904850-09-0
- Chico Xavier, Medium of the Century. Roundtable Publishing, 2010, ISBN 0-9564493-1-X
