= David Fontana =

British psychologist (1934–2010)

David G. J. Fontana FBPsS (1 November 1934 – 18 October 2010) was a British psychologist, parapsychologist and author. He was a Professor of Psychology at Cardiff University. He was also a visiting professor at Liverpool John Moores University and the University of Algarve.

== Biography ==
Born in Middlesex, Fontana was a Fellow of the British Psychological Society, a Chartered Psychologist and a Chartered Counselling Psychologist. He published more than 45 books, including popular treatments of dreams and symbols. Fontana took an interest in paranormal research such as mediumship, poltergeist cases and electronic voice phenomena and was at one time president of the Society for Psychical Research, from 1995 to 1998.

Fontana, together with Ingrid Slack and Martin Treacy in 1996, established a Transpersonal Psychology Section within the British Psychological Society, adding academic credibility to this school of thought at the fringe of academic psychology. Fontana attended the annual conferences of the Transpersonal Section of the British Psychological Society, which, for the first two years, were in Birmingham, and from 1999 onwards, generally took place at Cloughton, near Scarborough, North Yorkshire.

He served as the first president of the British Psychological Society's Transpersonal Section, a post he held from 1996 to 2001. His primary academic affiliation was at Cardiff University, where he was Distinguished Visiting Fellow. He wrote on such topics as Buddhism, meditation, dreams, symbols, the psychology of religion, Christianity and survival.

== Reception ==
Michael Stausberg in a review for Fontana's book Psychology, Religion, and Spirituality wrote that most religious scholars would not consider his arguments valid and "empirical-minded scholars of religion would probably find some of [his] interpretations of religious traditions and their treatment somewhat questionable or naïve."

Fontana was a believer in poltergeists and proposed in an article that they could haunt tape recorders. He speculated that this may have happened to the parapsychologist Maurice Grosse who investigated the Enfield Poltergeist case. However, Tom Flynn, a media expert for the Committee for Skeptical Inquiry, examined Fontana's article and suggested an entirely naturalistic explanation for the phenomena. According to the sceptical investigator Joe Nickell, "Occasionally, especially with older tape and under humid conditions, as the tape travels, it can adhere to one of the guide posts. When this happens on a deck where both supply and take-up spindles are powered, the tape continues to feed, creating a fold. It was such a loop of tape, Flynn theorizes, that threaded its way amid the works of Grosse’s recorder."

== Works ==
- The Meditator's Handbook: A Comprehensive Guide to Eastern and Western Meditation Techniques (1992)
- Teach Yourself To Dream: A Practical Guide (1997)
- Meditation: An Introductory Guide to Relaxation for Mind and Body (1999)
- Discover Zen: A Practical Guide to Personal Serenity (2001)
- Learn to Meditate: A Practical Guide to Self-Discovery and Fulfillment(1998)
- Personality in the Workplace (2000) Macmillan Press
- The Secret Language of Symbols: A Visual Key to Symbols and Their Meanings (2003)
- Psychology, Religion and Spirituality (2003)
- Learn to Dream: Interpret Dream Symbolism, Enhance Inner Life, Remember Your Dreams (2004)
- Is There An Afterlife?: A Comprehensive Overview of the Evidence (2005)
- Life Beyond Death: What Should We Expect? (2009)
- Creative Meditation & Visualization (2007)
- 1000 Dreams: Discover the meanings of dream symbols, secrets & stories (2011)
