= Geoff Holder =

British author (born 1958)

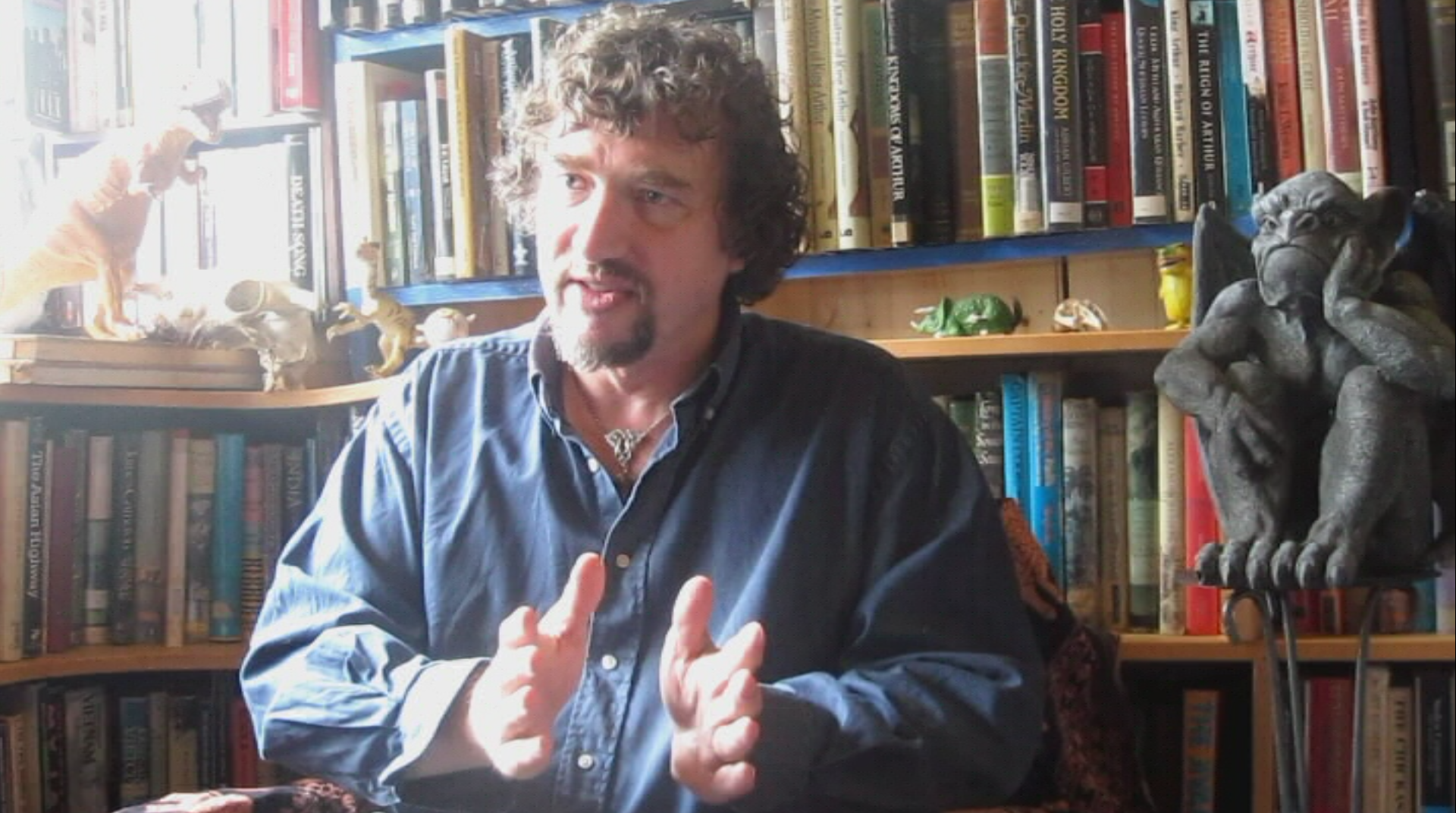
- Born: 1958 (age 67–68); Cardiff, Wales
- Occupations: Non-fiction writer (Forteana, paranormal, supernatural, gothic, history, folklore, parapsychology); scriptwriter; producer; lecturer
- Known for: "The Guide to Mysterious..." series; "Paranormal..." series; "101 Things to do With a Stone Circle"
- Website: www.geoffholder.com

Geoff Holder is a British author. He has written twenty non-fiction books on the paranormal, as well as on unusual and unexplained events and objects. His works include The Jacobites and the Supernatural and 101 Things to Do with a Stone Circle, Scottish Bodysnatchers and nine titles in The Guide to the Mysterious... series, covering subjects throughout Britain.

His work encompasses folklore, archaeology, local history, parapsychology, ghosts, Forteana, neo-antiquarianism, witchcraft, gargoyles and graveyards.

He also actively participates to paranormal investigations as a member of The Ghost Club.

== Early life and education ==
Geoff Holder was born in Cardiff, Wales in 1958, and grew up within the city, before later relocating to Perthshire. Holder cites an interest in dinosaurs, dragons and all things mythological as an inspiration for his future career.

He spent three years studying with the Open University, achieving qualifications in the Humanities, Social Sciences and Popular Culture. This was furthered by a degree in Film and Media studies at the University of Stirling as a mature student, followed by a postgraduate diploma at Duncan of Jordanstone College of Art and Design, Dundee.

Whilst attending Duncan of Jordanstone College of Art and Design, he recreated the story of the Garden of Eden on stop-motion film, using figurines from various sci-fi series to play the roles. The cast included He-Man as Jehovah, a Dalek as Samael, and dinosaurs in various supporting roles.

== Career ==
Throughout his working life, he held jobs including public footpath surveyor, coal shoveller, arts festival assistant, factory worker, fruit picker, civil servant and turkey slaughterhouse worker.

Holder worked as a scriptwriter and producer for production company Speakeasy Productions, in Stanley, Perthshire, writing and producing works including Scotland: The Mysterious Country, a documentary series for STV, and The Mary Millington Story, which aired on Channel 4.

His early work included contributions to the Perthshire Advertiser, submitting the weekly column Mysterious Perthshire. His other early journalistic work included pieces on travel and motorbike culture.

== Literary works ==
The Guide to Mysterious Perthshire was published in December 2006 by Tempus Publishing (now The History Press).

Since then he has written more than twenty books, including Paranormal Dundee, The Guide to Mysterious Skye & Lochalsh, The Guide to Mysterious Glasgow and The Guide to the Mysterious Lake District.

== Bibliography ==
- The Guide to Mysterious Perthshire (2006) ISBN 978-0-7524-4140-5
- The Guide to Mysterious Iona and Staffa (2007) ISBN 978-0-7524-4380-5
- The Guide to Mysterious Loch Ness and the Inverness Area (2007) ISBN 978-0-7524-4485-7
- The Guide to Mysterious Arran (2008) ISBN 978-0-7524-4720-9
- The Guide to Mysterious Stirlingshire (2008) ISBN 978-0-7524-4768-1
- 101 Things To Do with a Stone Circle (2009) ISBN 978-0-7524-4806-0
- The Guide to Mysterious Glasgow (2009) ISBN 978-0-7524-4826-8
- The Guide to Mysterious Aberdeenshire (2009) ISBN 978-0-7524-4988-3
- The Guide to the Mysterious Lake District (2009) ISBN 978-0-7524-4987-6
- Perthshire Murders (2009) ISBN 978-1-84868-072-2
- The Guide to Mysterious Skye and Lochalsh (2010) ISBN 978-0-7524-4989-0
- Haunted Aberdeen and District (2010) ISBN 978-0-7524-5533-4
- Scottish Bodysnatchers: A Gazetteer (2010) ISBN 978-0-7524-5603-4
- The Jacobites and the Supernatural (2010) ISBN 978-1-84868-588-8
- The Guide to Mysterious Aberdeen (2010) ISBN 978-0-7524-5659-1
- Paranormal Cumbria (2010) ISBN 978-07524-5412-2
- Paranormal Perthshire (2010) ISBN 978-0-7524-5421-4
- Paranormal Dundee (2011) ISBN 978-0-7524-5419-1
- Paranormal Glasgow (2011) ISBN 978-0-7524-5420-7
- The Little Book of Glasgow (2011) ISBN 978-0-7524-6004-8
- Bloody Scottish History: Edinburgh (2012) ISBN 978-0-7524-6293-6
