= Rita Goold =

British psychic and spiritualist medium

Rita Goold was a British psychic and spiritualist medium from Leicester.

== Biography ==
Goold acted as a physical medium in the 1980s. She claimed to be a psychic and communicate with beings who created crop circles. She also acted as a trance medium and claimed to channel and materialize the spirit of a dead nine-year-old boy known as "Russell". Other spirits she said to materialize included the discredited medium Helen Duncan and Raymond the son of Oliver Lodge.

Goold was accused as being a fraud by other spiritualists throughout her career. She became a popular medium in Britain known for her abilities to produce ectoplasm and materialize spirits, however, investigators discovered that the materialization figures were Goold herself and that she was a fraud. Goold refused infra-red cameras in her séances and would work only in dark conditions.

In 1984, Tony Cornell attended a series of séances with Goold. During a séance the spirit Russell materialized. However, Cornell felt the hands of Russell and described them as female-like with long nails; moreover, he was the same size as Goold when he was meant to be a boy and he smelt of Goold's perfume.

The other spirit who materialized Helen Duncan was the same size as Goold but was 224 pounds before she died. At the end of the séance when the lights were turned on Cornell observed that one of the shoes was different on Goold from the one before the séance and that one of her trouser legs was rolled up, indicating that she had changed clothing during the séance. Goold would also play music during her séances which provided cover for her to change clothes and when the music was turned off would pretend to be the spirits.
