= Alec Harris =

Welsh spiritualist and medium

Alexander Frederick Harris (1897–1974) was a Welsh spiritualist and medium.

== Biography ==
Harris was born in Treherbert, Wales. As a young man he joined the army as the First World War (1914–18) began. He married in 1928 and, in the 1930s, was introduced to spiritualism. Despite being initially skeptical about spiritualism, he attended séances with the medium Helen Duncan which he was convinced were genuine. After attending other séances he became a medium himself and claimed the ability to materialise spirit guides. Harris only worked in dark conditions with a cabinet in a curtained-off alcove from his audience where the spirits were reported to emerge.

In the 1940s it was stated by spiritualists that he could materialize as many as 15 to 30 spirits in a single séance. He later moved to South Africa to resume a career as a medium. He conducted séances until his death in 1974. He died on 12 February 1974 in Johannesburg. His wife, Louie Harris, wrote a biography of him after his death.

== Claims investigated ==
In January 1955, Tony Cornell attended a séance to investigate the mediumship of Harris. In the séance, Harris sat behind a curtain cabinet and in total eleven "spirit" figures came out from behind the curtain at different times dressed in different clothing. They walked around the room and communicated with the sitters, and then disappeared behind the curtain. The room was in complete darkness apart from some dim light in the middle of the room.

Cornell noted that all the figures had a similar stature, they dressed similarly but used different masks and hats. Only one figure came out from the curtain at a time and always minutes after the previous one. According to the sitters who had touched the figures, their skin felt coarse and rough even though some were supposed to be female. Cornell wrote that a stomach rumble, nicotine-smelling breath and a pulse gave away the fact that all the figures were in fact Harris and that he had dressed up as each one behind the cabinet. The cabinet was not examined before or after the sitting and Harris refused to be searched before or after the sitting.

The spirit figures were also reported to creak and move floorboards as they walked on them, indicating that they were human.
