= Enfield poltergeist =

Claim of supernatural activity

Coordinates: 51.6553°N 0.0355°W

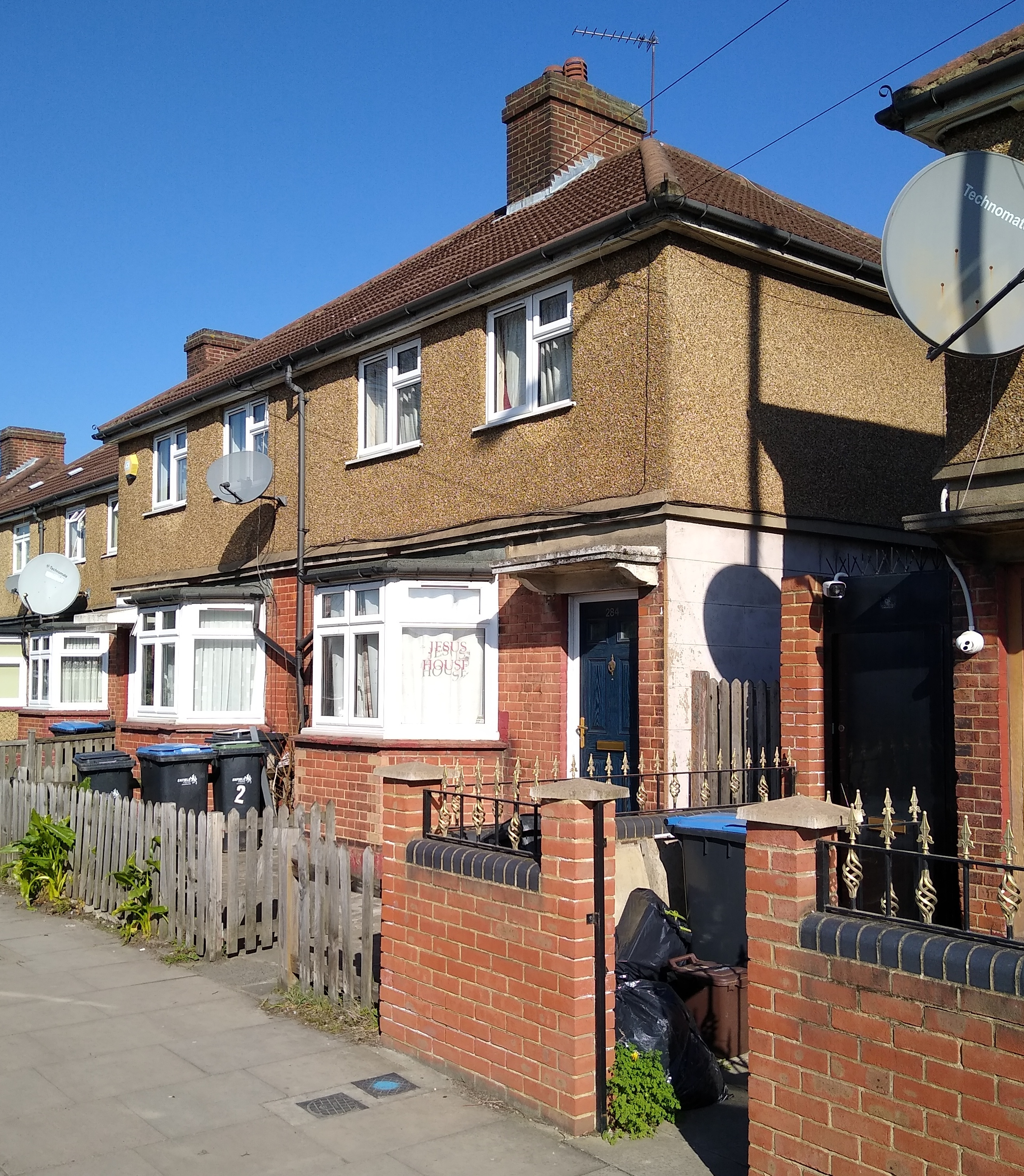
284 Green Street, claimed home of the Enfield poltergeist

The Enfield poltergeist was a claim of supernatural activity at 284 Green Street, a council house in Brimsdown, Enfield, London, England, between 1977 and 1979. The alleged poltergeist activity was centred on sisters Janet, aged 11, and Margaret Hodgson, aged 13.

Some members of the Society for Psychical Research (SPR) such as paranormal investigator Maurice Grosse and writer Guy Lyon Playfair, believed the haunting to be genuine, while others like Anita Gregory and John Beloff were "unconvinced" and found evidence the girls had faked incidents for the benefit of journalists. Members of the Committee for the Scientific Investigation of Claims of the Paranormal (CSICOP), including stage magicians Milbourne Christopher and Joe Nickell, criticised paranormal investigators for being credulous whilst also identifying elements of the case as being indicative of a hoax.

The story attracted press coverage in British newspapers, has been mentioned in books, featured in television and radio documentaries, and dramatised in the 2016 horror film The Conjuring 2.

== Claims ==
In August 1977, single mother Peggy Hodgson called the Metropolitan Police to her rented home at 284 Green Street in Enfield, London, saying she had witnessed furniture moving and that two of her four children had heard knocking sounds on the walls. The children included Janet, aged 11, and Margaret, aged 13. A police constable reported witnessing a chair "wobble and slide" but "could not determine the cause of the movement." Over a period of 18 months until approximately 1979, the story was regularly covered in the tabloid Daily Mirror newspaper, and featured claims by over 30 people including Hodgsons' neighbours, paranormal investigators, and journalists who said they variously heard or recorded disembodied "gruff" voices and loud knocking noises, saw thrown toys, overturned chairs, moving of heavy furniture, and children supposedly levitating.

== Investigations ==
=== Paranormal ===
Society for Psychical Research (SPR) members Maurice Grosse and Guy Lyon Playfair reported: "curious whistling and barking noises coming from Janet's general direction." Although Playfair maintained the paranormal activity was genuine and wrote in his later book This House Is Haunted: The True Story of a Poltergeist (1980) that an "entity" was to blame for the Enfield disturbances, he often doubted the children's veracity and wondered if they were playing tricks and exaggerating. Still, Grosse and Playfair believed that, even though some of the alleged poltergeist activity was faked by the girls, other incidents were genuine. Other paranormal investigators who visited the Enfield house included American demonologists Ed and Lorraine Warren, who were convinced that the events had a supernatural explanation. According to Brian Dunning, the Warrens' visit was short: "Ed Warren tried to persuade Playfair that money could be made from this case by writing books and selling movie rights; and then the Warrens left".

Janet was detected in trickery: a video camera in an adjoining room caught her bending spoons and attempting to bend an iron bar. Grosse had observed Janet banging a broom handle on the ceiling and hiding his tape recorder. According to Playfair, one of Janet's voices, whom she called Bill, displayed a "habit of suddenly changing the topic—it was a habit Janet also had". When Janet and Margaret admitted pranking to journalists, Grosse and Playfair compelled the girls to retract their confessions. The two men were mocked by other researchers for being easily duped.

According to Grosse and Playfair, a man named Terry Wilkins contacted them after hearing Grosse on an LBC radio talk show and claimed one of Janet's voices was that of his father who died in the house in 1963.

Psychical researcher Renée Haynes noted that doubts were raised about the alleged poltergeist voice at the SPR conference at Cambridge in 1978, where videocassettes from Enfield were examined. SPR investigator Anita Gregory stated the Enfield case had been "overrated", characterising several episodes of the girls' behaviour as "suspicious" and speculated that the girls had "staged" some incidents for the benefit of journalists seeking a sensational story. John Beloff, a former president of the SPR, investigated and suggested Janet was practising ventriloquism. Both Beloff and Gregory came to the conclusion that Janet and Margaret were playing tricks on the investigators.

=== Other ===
Milbourne Christopher, an American stage magician, briefly investigated the Enfield occurrences and failed to observe anything that could be called paranormal. He was dismayed by what he felt was suspicious activity on the part of Janet, later concluding that "the poltergeist was nothing more than the antics of a little girl who wanted to cause trouble and who was very, very clever." Ventriloquist Ray Alan visited the house and concluded that Janet's male voices were simply vocal tricks.

== Sceptical interpretations ==
=== Criticism of investigations ===
Sceptic Joe Nickell of the US-based Committee for Skeptical Inquiry Committee for the Scientific Investigation of Claims of the Paranormal (CSICOP) examined the findings of paranormal investigators and criticized them for being overly credulous; when a supposedly disembodied demonic voice was heard, Playfair noted that "as always Janet's lips hardly seemed to be moving." He states that a remote-controlled still camera—the photographer was not present in the room with the girls—timed to take a picture every fifteen seconds was shown by investigator Melvin Harris to reveal pranking by the girls. He argues that a photo allegedly depicting Janet levitating actually shows her bouncing off the bed as if it were a trampoline. Harris called the photos examples of common "gymnastics" and said, "It's worth remembering that Janet was a school sports champion!"

Nickell pointed out that a tape-recorder malfunction that Grosse attributed to supernatural activity and SPR president David Fontana described as an occurrence "which appeared to defy the laws of mechanics" was a typical threading jam occurring with older model reel to reel tape-recorders. He also said that Ed Warren was "notorious for exaggerating and even making up incidents in such cases, often transforming a 'haunting' case into one of 'demonic possession'."

In 2015 Deborah Hyde commented that there was no solid evidence for the Enfield poltergeist: "The first thing to note is that the occurrences didn't happen under controlled circumstances. People frequently see what they expect to see, their senses being organised and shaped by their prior experiences and beliefs."

In Investigating the Paranormal by parapsychologist Tony Cornell, a chapter criticising the investigation by Grosse and Playfair was removed when they threatened legal action against Cornell. Cornell had visited the house, with other investigators Alan Gauld and Bernard Carr, during the investigation and had been critical of how the pair had conducted themselves, believing they had not established control conditions. During his visit he had tried to speak to Peggy about an incident she could have been witness to, but had been prevented from doing so by Grosse. He had also secretly placed water balloons under the children's beds during the night, however it was only in the morning, when he had told the children of this, that the balloons were popped. Cornell and Playfair did exchange letters at the time regarding Cornell's concerns. Cornell was told by Grosse and Playfair that Peggy had told them he, Gauld and Carr were not welcome back at the property after this, although Cornell had recalled that, on leaving, she had told him to come back at any time.

=== Response to claims ===
Sceptics have argued that the alleged poltergeist voice that originated from Janet was produced by false vocal cords above the larynx and had the phraseology and vocabulary of a child. In a television interview for BBC Scotland, Janet was observed to gain attention by waving her hand and then putting her hand in front of her mouth while a claimed "disembodied" voice was heard. During the interview both girls were asked the question, "How does it feel to be haunted by a poltergeist?" Janet replied, "It's not haunted" and Margaret, in a hushed tone, interrupted, "Shut up". Sceptics have regarded these factors as evidence against the case.

As a "magician experienced in the dynamics of trickery" Nickell examined Playfair's account and contemporary press clippings. He noted that the supposed poltergeist "tended to act only when it was not being watched" and concluded that the incidents were best explained as children's pranks.

Although Grosse made tape recordings of Janet and believed no trickery was involved, the magician Bob Couttie said, "He made some of the recordings available to me and, having listened to them very carefully, I came to the conclusion that there was nothing in what I had heard that was beyond the capabilities of an imaginative teenager." All of the recordings have been catalogued and digitised by the SPR and a book of their content, The Enfield Poltergeist Tapes, was produced by Melvyn Willin in 2019.

A 2016 article by psychologist Chris French in Time Out magazine described five reasons why he believed the case to have been a hoax. His reasons are:

- The two sisters involved admitted to hoaxing some of the activity
- The photo of Janet levitating above her bed could just as easily be explained as Janet jumping.
- The "spirit" of an old man who supposedly possessed Janet took a great deal of interest in menstruation, a subject more significant to a young girl than an old man.
- Eyewitnesses are notoriously unreliable
- Other schoolgirl pranks before and after have got out of hand

== In popular culture ==
- On 26 December 1978, BBC Radio 4 broadcast The Enfield Poltergeist by BBC reporter Rosalind Morris. Morris visited the Hodgson family on numerous occasions to make this documentary.
- In 1992, the BBC aired a controversial mockumentary titled Ghostwatch, written by Stephen Volk and based on the Enfield poltergeist.
- In March 2007, Channel 4 aired a documentary about the Enfield poltergeist titled Interview with a Poltergeist.
- The Enfield poltergeist has been featured in episodes of ITV series Strange but True? and Extreme Ghost Stories.
- The Enfield poltergeist was the subject of the 2015 Sky Living television series The Enfield Haunting, which was broadcast from 4–17 May 2015.
- The 2016 film The Conjuring 2 is based on Ed and Lorraine Warren's investigation of the case.
- In 2018, the BBC Radio 4 programme The Reunion, presented by Sue MacGregor, revisited the case, with interviews with witnesses Morris, Richard Grosse and Graham Morris.
- In 2023, a play titled The Enfield Haunting was announced, starring Catherine Tate, to be premiered at Theatre Royal, Brighton and Richmond Theatre before moving to the Ambassadors Theatre in London from 30 November 2023 to 2 March 2024.
- On 27 October 2023, Apple TVdebuted The Enfield Poltergeist miniseries, filming the documentary in a recreated set of the allegedly haunted house at 284 Green Street, utilising actors lipsyncing to original tape recordings, archival video footage and modern-day interviews with living witnesses of the events.
- On 13 October 2024, BBC Two debuted its series Hauntings. The first episode, titled "The Enfield Poltergeist", revisited the unusual events of 1977 with archival footage & new testimonies from witnesses present in the Enfield house.
