= Anita Gregory =

British psychologist (1925–1984)

- Born: Anita Kohsen; 9 June 1925; Weimar Republic
- Died: 7 November 1984 (aged 59)
- Occupations: Psychologist, parapsychologist
- Known for: Enfield Poltergeist
- Spouse: C.C.L. Gregory (m. 1954; died 1964)

Anita Gregory (née Kohsen; 9 June 1925 – 7 November 1984) was a German-born British psychologist and parapsychologist. Gregory was a lecturer at the Polytechnic of North London. She was a member of the Society for Psychical Research and conducted experiments with the British psychic Matthew Manning.

She fled Nazi Germany due to the persecution of the Jews there. Her husband from 1954 was C.C.L. Gregory.

== Enfield Poltergeist ==
Gregory, who investigated the Enfield Poltergeist case, stated it had been "overrated", characterizing several episodes of the girl's behavior as suspicious and speculated that the girls had staged some incidents for the benefit of reporters seeking a sensational story. John Beloff, a former president of the SPR, investigated and suggested Janet was practising ventriloquism. Both Beloff and Gregory came to the conclusion that Janet and Margaret were playing tricks on the investigators. According to Gregory, a video camera in the room next door caught Janet bending spoons and attempting to bend an iron bar.

The Society for Psychical Research did not publish her critical report on the Enfield case. Gregory described the evidence from the case as "greatly exaggerated" and "pathetic".

== Publications ==
- The Strange Case of Rudi Schneider (1985)
