= Jocelyn Playfair =

British novelist

Jocelyn Noel Christine Playfair (née Malan; 21 August 1904 – 14 May 1997) was a British novelist.

She was born in Lucknow, British India, the daughter of Lieutenant-Colonel Noel Malan. Both of her parents were of French Huguenot descent. The year she was born (1904), her father accompanied Francis Younghusband on the Younghusband Expedition to Tibet.

She married Ian Playfair in 1930, who was in the Royal Engineers and later was appointed the rank of Major-General. After the birth of their two sons, the couple returned to Britain in the late 1930s. She wrote ten books between 1939 and 1952.

She died in Hounslow, London, on 14 May 1997.

== Bibliography ==
- Murder without Mystery (1939)
- Storm in a Village (1940)
- Eastern Week-End (1940)
- The Mill (1942)
- A House in the Country (1944), republished by Persephone Books in 2002 (ISBN 978-19031-552-02)
- Men Without Armour (1946)
- The Desirable Residence (1947)
- The Fire and the Rose (1948)
- A Man called Miranda (1949)
- The Nettlebed (1952)

== Links ==
- Information on A House in the Country
- Author Profile at Persephone Books
- Jocelyn Playfair at WorldCat
