= Séance =

Attempt to communicate with spirits

A séance or seance (/ˈseɪ.ɑːns/; French: [seɑ̃s]) is an attempt to communicate with spirits. The word séance comes from the French word for "session", from the Old French seoir, "to sit". In French, the word's meaning is quite general and mundane: one may, for example, speak of "une séance de cinéma" (lit. 'a movie session'). In English, however, the word came to be used specifically for a meeting of people who are gathered to receive messages from ghosts or to listen to a spirit medium discourse with or relay messages from spirits. In modern English usage, participants need not be seated while engaged in a séance.

Fictionalised conversations between the deceased appeared in Dialogues of the Dead by George, First Baron Lyttelton, published in England in 1760. Among the notable spirits quoted in this volume are Peter the Great, Pericles, a "North-American Savage", William Penn, and Christina, Queen of Sweden. The popularity of séances grew dramatically with the founding of the religion of Spiritualism in the mid-nineteenth century. Perhaps the best-known series of séances conducted at that time were those of Mary Todd Lincoln, who, grieving the loss of her son, organized Spiritualist séances in the White House, which were attended by her husband, President Abraham Lincoln, and other prominent members of society. The 1887 Seybert Commission report marred the credibility of Spiritualism at the height of its popularity by publishing exposures of fraud and showmanship among secular séance leaders. Modern séances continue to be a part of the religious services of Spiritualist, Spiritist, and Espiritismo churches today, where a greater emphasis is placed on spiritual values versus showmanship.

== Varieties ==
The term séance is used in a few different ways, and can refer to any of four different activities, each with its own social norms and conventions, its own favoured tools, and its own range of expected outcomes.

=== Religious ===
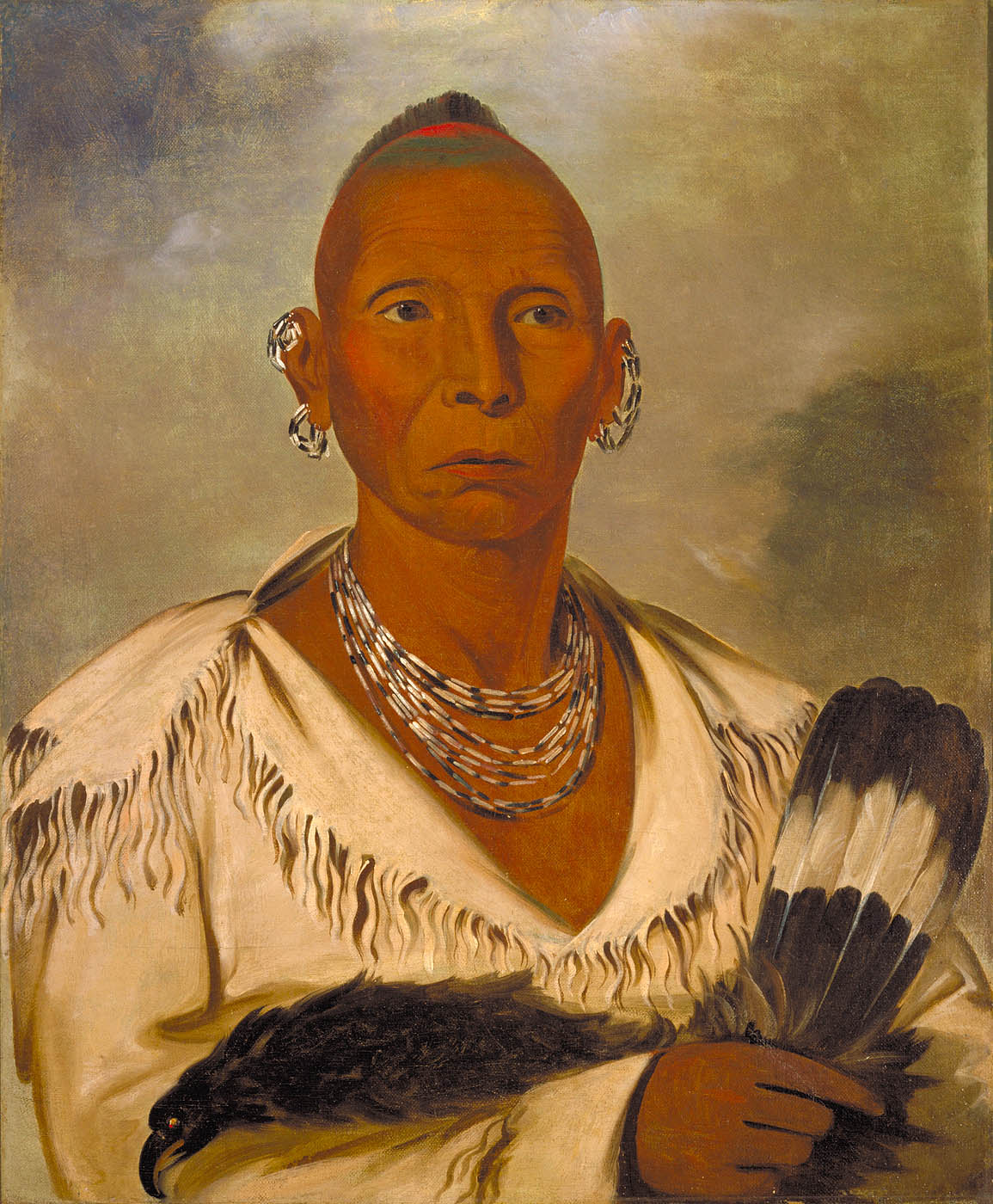
Black Hawk

In the religion of Spiritualism, and the religion of Divine Metaphysics (a federally recognized religious branch out of Spiritualism in the United States), it is generally a part of services to communicate with living personalities in the spirit world. Usually, this is only called "séance" by outsiders; the preferred term for Spiritualists is "receiving messages". In these sessions, which generally take place in well-lit Spiritualist churches or outdoors at Spiritualist camps (such as Lily Dale in upstate New York or Camp Cassadaga in Florida), an ordained minister or gifted contact medium will relate messages from spirit personalities to those here in the physical form. Generally Spiritualist "message services" or "demonstrations of the continuity of life" are open to the public. Sometimes the medium stands to receive messages and only the sitter is seated; in some churches, the message service is preceded by a "healing service" involving some form of faith healing.

In addition to communicating with the spirits of people who have a personal relationship to congregants, some Spiritual Churches also deal with spirits who may have a specific relationship to the medium or a historic relationship to the body of the church. An example of the latter is the spirit of Black Hawk, a Sauk warrior who lived during the 19th century. Black Hawk was a spirit who was often contacted by the Spiritualist medium Leafy Anderson and he remains the central focus of special services in the African American Spiritual Churches that she founded.

In the Latin American religion of Espiritismo, which somewhat resembles Spiritualism, séance sessions in which congregants attempt to communicate with spirits are called misas (literally "masses"). The spirits addressed in Espiritismo are often those of ancestors or Catholic saints.

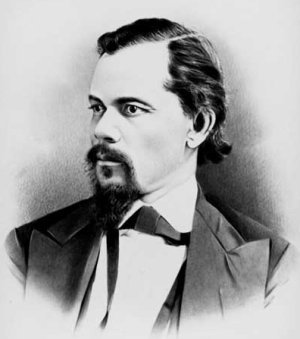
Paschal Beverly Randolph

=== Stage mediumship ===
Mediums who give performances on stage of contacting spirits, with audience members seated before them, are not literally holding a séance, because they themselves are not seated; however, this is still called "séance". One of the foremost early practitioners of this type of contact with the dead was Paschal Beverly Randolph, who worked with the spirits of the relatives of audience members, but was also famed for his ability to contact and deliver messages from ancient seers and philosophers, such as Plato.

=== Leader-assisted ===
Leader-assisted séances are generally conducted by small groups of people, with participants seated around a table in a dark or semi-dark room. The leader is typically asserted to be a medium and he or she may go into a trance that theoretically allows the spirits to communicate through their body, conveying messages to the other participants. Other modes of communication may also be attempted, including automatic writing, numbered raps, levitation of the table or of spirit trumpets, apports, or even smell. It was thought spirits of the dead resided within the realm of dark and shadow, making the absence of light a necessity to invoke them. Skeptics were unwilling to accept this required condition. Saying,"You would not buy an automobile if it was only presented in the dark."

This is the type of séance that is most often the subject of shock and scandal when it turns out that the leader is practicing some form of stage magic illusion or using mentalism tricks to defraud clients.

=== Informal social ===
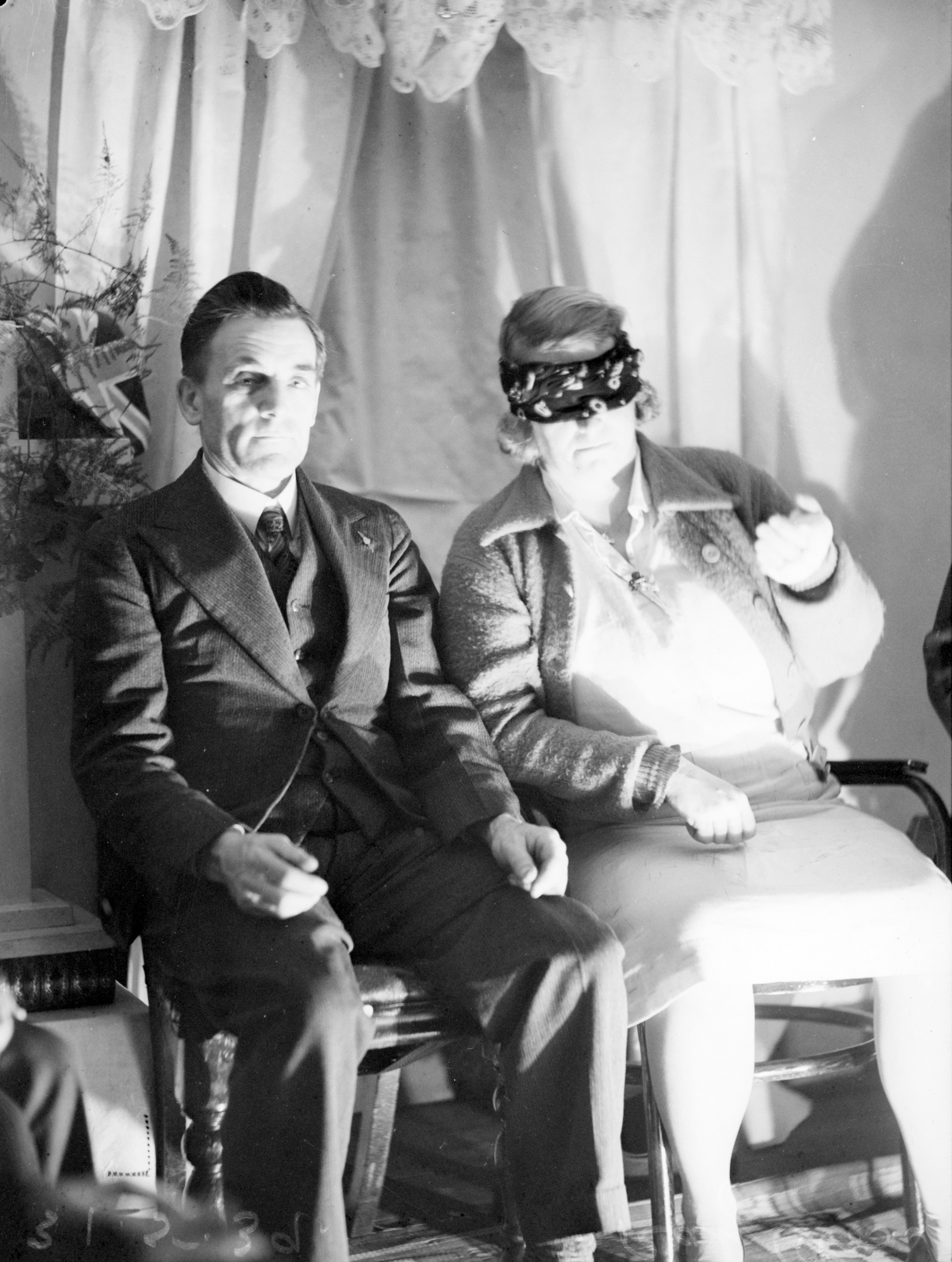
Seance, Balmain, Sydney, 1939, by Ray Olsen

Among those with an interest in the occult, a tradition has grown up of conducting séances outside of any religious context and without a leader. Sometimes only two or three people are involved, and, if they are young, they may be using the séance as a way to test their understanding of the boundaries between reality and the paranormal. It is in such small séances that the planchette and ouija board are most often utilized.

=== Spiritualist ===
Here spiritualists and practitioners (psychic and mediums) hold a seance so that all participants speak with various personalities in the spirit world. This held in a seating manner in a circle.

== Tools and techniques ==
=== Mediumship, trance, and channeling ===
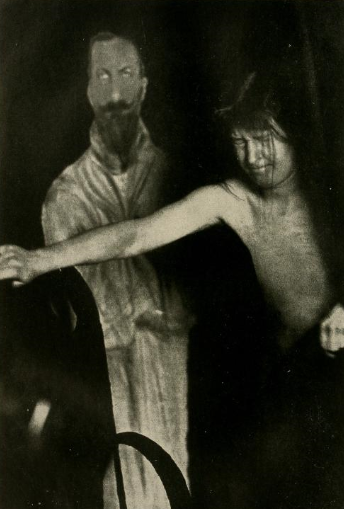
The fraud medium Eva Carrière in a séance with cardboard cut out figure of King Ferdinand of Bulgaria.

Mediumship involves an act where the practitioner attempts to receive messages from spirits of the dead and from other spirits that the practitioner believes exist. Some self-ordained mediums are fully conscious and awake while functioning as contacts; others may slip into a partial or full trance or into an altered state of consciousness. These self-called "trance-mediums" often state that, when they emerge from the trance state, they have no recollection of the messages they conveyed; it is customary for such practitioners to work with an assistant who writes down or otherwise records their words.

=== Spirit boards, talking boards, and ouija boards ===
Spirit boards, also known as talking boards, or ouija boards (after a well-known brand name) are flat tablets, typically made of wood, Masonite, chipboard, or plastic. On the board are a number of symbols, pictures, letters, numbers and/or words. The board is accompanied by a planchette (French for "little board"), which can take the form of a pointer on three legs or magnifying glass on legs; homemade boards may employ a shot glass as a planchette. A most basic Ouija board would contain simply the alphabet of whatever country the board is being used in, although it is not uncommon for whole words to be added.

The board is used as follows: One or more of the participants in the séance place one or two fingers on the planchette which is in the middle of the board. The appointed medium asks questions of the spirit(s) with whom they are attempting to communicate.

=== Trumpets, slates, tables, and cabinets ===
During the latter half of the 19th century, a number of Spiritualist mediums began to advocate the use of specialized tools for conducting séances, particularly in leader-assisted sessions conducted in darkened rooms. "Spirit trumpets" were horn-shaped speaking tubes that were said to magnify the whispered voices of spirits to audible range. "Spirit slates" consisted of two chalkboards bound together that, when opened, were said to reveal messages written by spirits. "Séance tables" were special lightweight tables that were said to rotate, float, or levitate when spirits were present. "Spirit cabinets" were portable closets into which mediums were placed, often bound with ropes, in order to prevent them from manipulating the various aforementioned tools.

== Critical objections ==
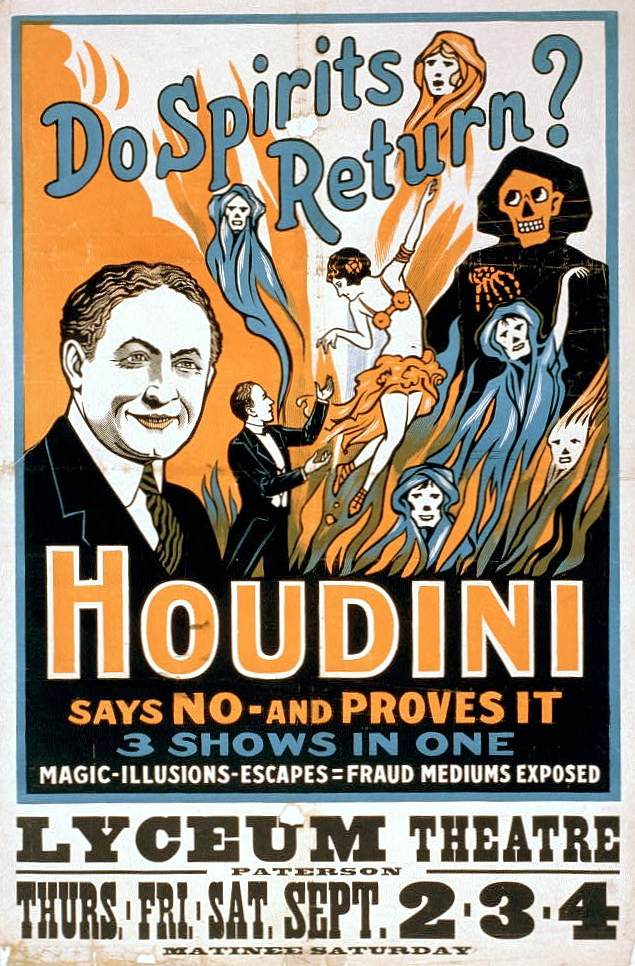
A poster for an early 20th century stage show from Houdini, advertised as proving that spirits do not return

Scientific skeptics and atheists generally consider both religious and secular séances to be scams, or at least a form of pious fraud, citing a lack of empirical evidence. The exposure of supposed mediums whose use of séance tools derived from the techniques of stage magic has been disturbing to many believers in spirit communication. In particular, the 1870s exposures of the Davenport Brothers as illusionists and the 1887 report of the Seybert Commission brought an end to the first historic phase of Spiritualism. Stage magicians like John Nevil Maskelyne and Harry Houdini made a side-line of exposing fraudulent mediums during the late 19th and early 20th centuries. In 1976, M. Lamar Keene described deceptive techniques that he himself had used in séances; however, in the same book, Keene also stated that he still had a firm belief in God, life after death, ESP, and other psychic phenomena. In his 2004 television special Seance, magician Derren Brown held a séance and afterwards described some of the tricks used by him (and 19th-century mediums) to create the illusion of paranormal events.

Critics of channeling—including both skeptics and believers—state that since the most commonly reported physical manifestations of channeling are an unusual vocal pattern or abnormal overt behaviors of the medium, it can be quite easily faked by anyone with theatrical talent. Critics of spirit board communication techniques—again including both skeptics and believers—state that the premise that a spirit will move the planchette and spell out messages using the symbols on the board is undermined by the fact that several people have their hands on the planchette, which allows any of them to spell out anything they want without the others knowing. They say that this is a common trick, used on occasions such as teenage sleepover parties, to scare the people present.

Another criticism of spirit board communication involves what is called the ideomotor effect which has been suggested as an automatism, or subconscious mechanism, by which a Ouija-user's mind unknowingly guides his hand upon the planchette, hence he will honestly believe he is not moving it, when, in fact, he is. This theory rests on the embedded premise that human beings actually have a "subconscious mind," a belief not held by all.

The exposures of fraud by tool-using mediums have had two divergent results: skeptics have used historic exposures as a frame through which to view all spirit mediumship as inherently fraudulent, while believers have tended to eliminate the use of tools but continued to practice mediumship in full confidence of its spiritual value to them.

Jews and Catholics are taught that it is sinful to attempt to conjure or control spirits in accordance with Deuteronomy 18:9–12.

== Psychology ==
Research in anomalistic psychology has revealed the role of suggestion in seances. In a series of fake seance experiments (Wiseman et al.. 2003) paranormal believers and disbelievers were suggested by an actor that a table was levitating when, in fact, it remained stationary. After the seance, approximately one third of the participants incorrectly reported that the table had moved. The results showed a greater percentage of believers reporting that the table had moved. In another experiment the believers had also reported that a handbell had moved when it had remained stationary and expressed their belief that the fake seances contained genuine paranormal phenomena. The experiments strongly supported the notion that in the seance room, believers are more suggestible than disbelievers for suggestions that are consistent with their belief in paranormal phenomena.

== Notable mediums, attendees, and debunkers ==
=== Mediums ===
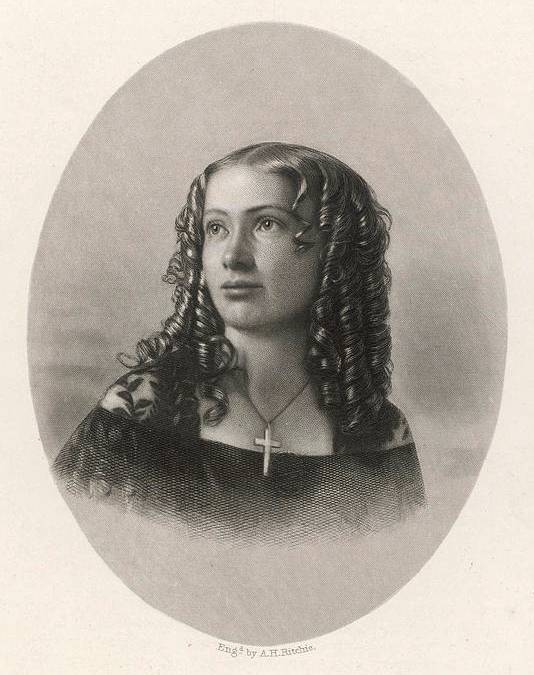
Cora Scott Hatch

Popular 19th-century trance medium lecturers include Cora Scott Hatch, Achsa W. Sprague, Emma Hardinge Britten (1823–1899), and Paschal Beverly Randolph (1825–1875).

Among the notable people who conducted small leader-assisted séances during the 19th century were the Fox sisters, whose activities included table-rapping, and the Davenport Brothers, who were famous for the spirit cabinet work. Both the Foxes and the Davenports were eventually exposed as frauds.

In the 20th century, notable trance mediums also include Edgar Cayce, Arthur Ford and David Marius Guardino.

=== Attendees ===
Notable people who have attended séances and professed a belief in Spiritualism include the social reformer Robert Owen; the journalist and pacifist William T. Stead; William Lyon Mackenzie King, the Prime Minister of Canada for 22 years, who sought spiritual contact and political guidance from his deceased mother, his pet dogs, and the late US President Franklin D. Roosevelt; the journalist and author Lloyd Kenyon Jones; and the physician and author Arthur Conan Doyle.

A number of artists, including abstractionists Hilma af Klint, the Regina Five, and Paulina Peavy have given partial or complete credit for some of their work to spirits that they contacted during seances. Paulina said that "when she painted, she did not have control over her brush, that it moved on its own, and that it was Lacamo (the spirit) who was directing it."

Scientists who have conducted a search for real séances and believed that contact with the dead is a reality include chemist William Crookes, evolutionary biologist Alfred Russel Wallace, inventor of radio Guglielmo Marconi, inventor of the telephone Alexander Graham Bell, experimental physicist Oliver Lodge, and inventor of television technology John Logie Baird, who said he had contacted the spirit of inventor Thomas Edison.

=== Debunkers ===
Among the best-known exposers of fraudulent mediumship acts have been the researchers Frank Podmore of the Society for Psychical Research, Harry Price of the National Laboratory of Psychical Research, the professional stage magicians John Nevil Maskelyne (who exposed the Davenport Brothers) and Harry Houdini, who clearly stated that he did not oppose the religion of Spiritualism itself, but only the trickery by phony mediums that was being practiced in the name of the religion.

The psychical researcher Hereward Carrington exposed the tricks of fraudulent mediums such as those used in slate-writing, table-turning, trumpet mediumship, materializations, sealed-letter reading and spirit photography. The skeptic Joseph McCabe documented many mediums who had been caught in fraud and the tricks they used in his book Is Spiritualism Based on Fraud? (1920).

Magicians have a long history of exposing the fraudulent methods of mediumship. Early debunkers included Chung Ling Soo, Henry Evans and Julien Proskauer. Later magicians to reveal fraud were Fulton Oursler, Joseph Dunninger, and Joseph Rinn. The researchers Trevor H. Hall and Gordon Stein have documented the trickery of the medium Daniel Dunglas Home. Tony Cornell exposed a number of fraudulent mediums including Rita Goold and Alec Harris.

== See also ==
- Fortune telling fraud
- Harry Houdini § Debunking spiritualists
- List of channelers
- Psychic reading
