= Maurice Grosse =

British paranormal investigator

- Grosse c. 1980
- Born: 6 March 1919; London, England
- Died: 14 October 2006 (aged 87); London, England
- Occupation(s): Paranormal investigator, inventor
- Organization(s): Society for Psychical Research; The Ghost Club
- Spouse: Betty Grosse (m. 1944)
- Children: 3

Maurice Grosse (6 March 1919 – 14 October 2006) was a British paranormal investigator. Famous for his involvement in the Enfield Poltergeist case from 1977 to 1979, he has been portrayed in several films and television series, including The Enfield Haunting (2015) by Timothy Spall and The Conjuring 2 (2016) by Simon McBurney.

== Early life ==
Grosse was educated at the Regent Street Polytechnic in London. After serving an apprenticeship in commercial art and design, he served in the Second World War with the Royal Artillery and was among those evacuated from Dunkirk in June 1940. Commissioned in 1941, he became responsible for the guarding and welfare of Italian prisoners of war for the remainder of the war. He married his wife Betty Yasny in 1944 and they had two daughters and a son. After the war he became an inventor, and he filed the first of his many mechanical patents in 1945. His most successful invention was the rotating advertising billboard. In 1961 Grosse founded his own design and engineering consultancy business which became responsible for launching many patents throughout the world.

== Psychical investigator ==
A personal tragedy launched Grosse into psychical research, when his daughter Janet was killed in a motorbike accident in August 1976. Following her death, Grosse reported that members of his family experienced a number of coincidences and psychic happenings, and this led him to join the Society for Psychical Research and The Ghost Club. In September 1977 he investigated an alleged poltergeist in a house in Green Street, Enfield, North London, that later became known as the Enfield poltergeist. Grosse claimed to have recorded many hours of audio and video evidence of the poltergeist while staying at the house for long periods of time, along with another psychical investigator, Guy Lyon Playfair, who later wrote the book This House is Haunted (1980).

Sceptic Joe Nickell criticised Grosse and Playfair's investigations as "credulous". When professional ventriloquist Ray Alan visited the house and concluded that the girls were faking an allegedly "demonic" voice because they "obviously loved all the attention they got", Grosse was so convinced it was of supernatural origin that he offered £1,000 to anyone who could duplicate the voice by ventriloquism or any other form of trickery.

The parapsychologist David Fontana proposed that poltergeists could haunt tape recorders and speculated that a peculiar threading jam experienced by Grosse while playing tape recordings made at the home was due to supernatural forces. However, Tom Flynn, a media expert for the Committee for Skeptical Inquiry examined Fontana's claims and suggested an entirely naturalistic explanation. According to Joe Nickell, "Occasionally, especially with older tape and under humid conditions, as the tape travels it can adhere to one of the guide posts. When this happens on a deck where both supply and take-up spindles are powered, the tape continues to feed, creating a fold. It was such a loop of tape, Flynn theorizes, that threaded its way amid the works of Grosse's recorder."

== Later life ==
Grosse investigated many other cases, and served as a member of the Society for Psychical Research's Council, as well as being the long-serving chairman of its Spontaneous Cases Committee. In 1995 Grosse was at a vigil in Charlton House when it was claimed that a piece of crockery materialised and shattered. In 2000 he recorded what he claimed were poltergeist knockings on videotape at the home of a family in north London. In addition to ghosts and poltergeists, Grosse also investigated numerous claims of precognition. He also put together an extensive collection of alleged examples of psychic photography. He continued this work right up until the summer of 2006.

Grosse appeared posthumously in Channel 4's documentary Interview with a Poltergeist which was transmitted on 6 March 2007. He also made an appearance on the Channel 4 mockumentary Da Ali G Show in which he was interviewed by Sacha Baron Cohen.

In 1998 Grosse sued David Baddiel for £10,000 after Baddiel had described a psychic investigator called Maurice Grosse who lives in High Barnet, North London, and runs away with a married woman.
