= Stanisława P. =

Polish spiritual medium

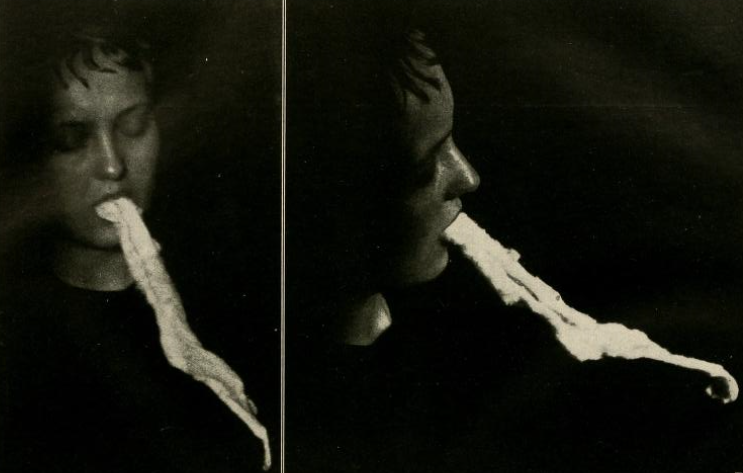
Stanisława P. with ectoplasm.

Stanisława Popielska (born c. 1893) most well known as Stanisława P. was a Polish spiritual medium who was alleged to have produced ectoplasm and the psychokinetic movement of objects.

In 1913, Stanisława was investigated by the psychical researcher Albert von Schrenck-Notzing. During the séances a number of flashlight photographs were taken, he published a book on the subject of materializations and declared her ectoplasm to be genuine. Schrenck-Notzing's experiments with the medium were criticized for their poor controls and he was accused by scientists of being the victim of fraud after his book was published.

Mathilde Ludendorff who attended a séance stated she had observed the ectoplasm to be made of gauze and it was attached to a secret thread that was pinned to the cabinet.

In 1930, Stanisława was discredited at the Institut Métapsychique by Eugéne Osty as she was caught cheating. Secret flashlight photographs that were taken revealed that her hand was free and she had moved objects on the séance table. Osty concluded that she was a comedic medium, and her psychokinetic phenomena was fraudulent.

== See also ==
- Jan Guzyk – Polish spiritual medium and fraudster
- Franek Kluski – Polish physical medium and fraudster
