= Kathleen Goligher =

Irish spiritualist medium

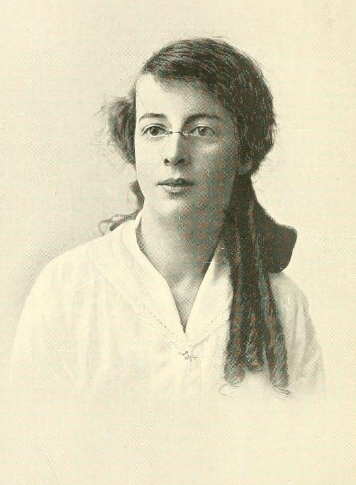
Kathleen Goligher

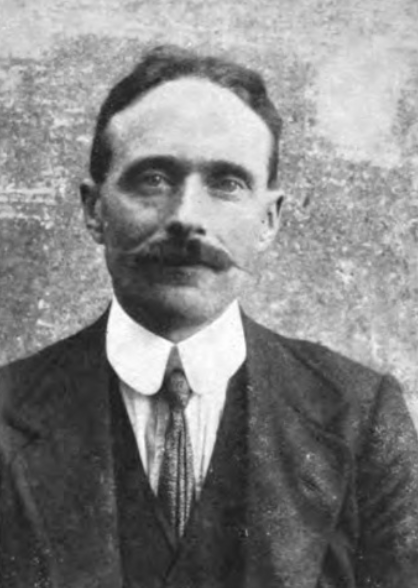
William Jackson Crawford

Kathleen Goligher (born 1898, died 1972) was an Irish spiritualist medium. Goligher was endorsed by engineer William Jackson Crawford who wrote three books about her. She was exposed as a fraud by physicist Edmund Edward Fournier d'Albe in 1921.

== Early life ==
Goligher was born in Belfast. She held séances in her own home with seven of her family members.

== Investigations of mediumship ==
The psychical researcher and engineer William Jackson Crawford (1881–1920) investigated the mediumship of Goligher and claimed she had levitated the table and produced ectoplasm.

Crawford in his books developed the "Cantilever Theory of Levitation" due to his experiments with Goligher. According to his theory the table was levitated by "psychic rods" of ectoplasm which came out of the body of the medium to operate as an invisible cantilever. Crawford took flashlight photographs of the substance, which he described as "plasma". Crawford investigated Goligher's mediumship at her house for six years before his death. Crawford's photographs of Goligher showed that the ectoplasm frequently issued from her vagina.

There were no scientific controls in the Crawford's séances with Goligher. She and her family members had their hands and legs free at all times. After Crawford's death the physicist Edmund Edward Fournier d'Albe investigated the medium Goligher at twenty sittings and arrived at the opposite conclusion to Crawford. According to d'Albe no ectoplasm or levitation had occurred with Goligher, and he stated he had found evidence of fraud. On 22 July 1921 he observed Goligher holding the table with her foot. He also discovered that the "ectoplasm" substance in the photographs of Crawford was muslin. During a séance d'Albe had observed white muslin between Goligher's feet.

In a letter to Harry Houdini, d'Albe wrote "I must say I was greatly surprised at Crawford's blindness." The conclusion from d'Albe was that the Goligher family were involved in the mediumship trickery and had duped Crawford. D'Albe published The Goligher Circle in 1922 which exposed the fraudulent mediumship of Goligher. Because of the exposure, she retired from mediumship in the same year.

== Critical evaluation ==
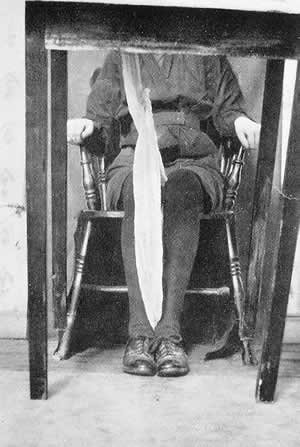
Goligher with muslin

Crawford's experiments were criticized by scientists for their inadequate controls and lack of precaution against fraud.

Physician Morton Prince in the Journal of Abnormal Psychology noted that Crawford's psychic rod hypothesis "fails to account for much and cannot be reconciled with what is scientifically known as matter, or force, or electricity, or energy."

A review in the Journal of Applied Psychology suggested that Crawford does "not seem to have been able to avoid self-deception, and his experiments are not convincing."

Psychical researcher Hereward Carrington noted that the photographs taken by Crawford look "dubious in appearance" and that "with rare exceptions, no other investigators had an opportunity to check-up his results, since outsiders were rarely admitted to the sittings."

The surgeon Charles Marsh Beadnell published a booklet in 1920 that debunked the experiments. He also offered a cash prize to any medium who could produce a single levitation under controlled conditions.

Physician Bryan Donkin studied the Crawford experiments and called attention to "the superabundant exposure of the massive credulity and total defect of logical power displayed by Dr. Crawford," who gives "the most pathetic picture of a willing victim of pernicious deception".

Psychologist Joseph Jastrow criticized the Crawford experiments as unscientific and wrote that "the minute detail of apparatus and all the paraphernalia of an engineering experiment which fills the Crawford books must ever remain an amazing document in the story of the metapsychic. As proof of what prepossession can do to a trained mind the case is invaluable."

Joseph McCabe suggested that Goligher had used her feet and toes to levitate the table and move objects in the séance room and compared her fraudulent mediumship to Eusapia Palladino, who performed similar tricks. Edward Clodd also dismissed the experiments as fraudulent and noted that Goligher refused invitation to be examined by a group of magicians and scientists.

Researchers such as Ruth Brandon and Mary Roach have heavily criticized Crawford's investigation, describing him as credulous and having a sexual interest in Goligher, such as an obsession with her underwear. Crawford held a deep fixation on underwear; for example, psychical researcher Theodore Besterman noted that before his suicide, Crawford "spent all his money (consequently leaving nothing) on a stack of woollen underwear for his family, sufficient to last for several years."

Susan Blackmore claimed that Eric Dingwall, an eccentric researcher interested in paranormal phenomena, told her around 1980 that Crawford had confessed before his death that all the Goligher phenomena were fraudulent.

== Later life ==
Kathleen Goligher married in 1925 and died in 1972.

== See also ==
- Eva Carrière
- Mina Crandon
