= Leslie Flint =

English psychic medium (1911–1994)

Flint with "ectoplasm"

Leslie Flint (1911 – 16 April 1994) was a British self-proclaimed medium who is credited as having been one of the last psychics to use direct-voice mediumship. He has been described by spiritualists as the most renowned psychic of the 20th century. Skeptics have pointed out a number of alleged frauds Flint perpetuated during his career.

== Biography ==
Flint was born in London in 1911 and reached the peak of his fame from the 1930s to the 1960s. He was famous for claiming to contact the spirits of dead celebrities, and would often record his sessions. He claimed his familiar, Mickey, was the spirit of a child who had been killed in 1910. Flint claimed to have seen his first spirit at the age of seven when his dead uncle appeared to him in his home. He conducted his first séance at the age of 17.

In his early life, he worked as a cinema usher and a cemetery gardener. Flint was a conscientious objector in World War II, serving in the Non-Combatant Corps before being seconded to coal-mining. The first public séance performed by Flint was in 1934, just after he formed an association called the Temple of Light.

Flint was an avid fan of Rudolph Valentino and acquired the only known copy of footage from The Young Rajah. Flint was wealthy and lived in a mansion house at Westbourne Terrace near London Paddington station. The mansion had been formerly occupied by the actor George Arliss.

During pre-production for the 1973 film Don't Look Now, director Nicolas Roeg and actress Julie Christie were invited by Flint to a séance he was holding for some American parapsychologists who were coming to observe him. Roeg and Christie attended and sat in a circle in the pitch dark and joined hands. Flint instructed his guests to "uncross" their legs, which Roeg subsequently incorporated into the film.

== Style of mediumship ==
When taking part in séances with Flint, participants would report hearing the voices of the dead surrounding them in the room. Flint would perform bound and gagged in an attempt to prove that he was not throwing his voice. He claimed that he was able to conjure ectoplasm from which he could then reconstruct vocal cords. However, Flint always insisted on performing in the dark, so séance-goers were unable to see him during the performances. He would sometimes even perform in a cupboard.

Amongst those who Flint claimed to have contacted were:

- Archimedes
- Helena Blavatsky
- Frédéric Chopin
- Winston Churchill
- Arthur Conan Doyle
- Elizabeth Fry
- Mahatma Gandhi
- Marilyn Monroe
- Harry Price
- George Bernard Shaw
- Bessie Smith
- Ellen Terry
- Rudolph Valentino
- Oscar Wilde
- Sir Oliver Lodge

The recordings of Flint's séances are now stored at the University of Manitoba. The collection contains around 2,000 audiotapes and 300 books. An extensive library of Leslie Flint recordings is available at The Leslie Flint Trust website, see External links.

== Alleged fraud ==
The photograph depicting the ectoplasm "voice-box" on the shoulder of Flint looked like it was made from cheesecloth and Mary Roach humorously described it as the "aftermath of a cafeteria food fight".

On 7 May 1948 the psychologist Donald J. West attended a séance at Flint's home. West examined the cabinet before the séance and personally attached a tape to Flint's mouth. After the séance he examined the tape covering Flint's mouth and it was no longer in line with the indelible marking that he had made. West asked Flint for further testing but Flint refused.

Gladys Lorrimore who attended a séance denied that the supposed "spirit voice" from Flint's direct-voice mediumship was her husband as the voice did not sound anything like her husband. Another of Flint's spirit voices was supposed to be from Helena Blavatsky, however the voice had no Russian accent.

Flint was accused of using prerecorded tapes to produce voices, as well as live accomplices providing two-way voice channels. Parapsychologists from the Society for Psychical Research who attended séances with Flint also claimed he was using ventriloquism to produce the voices that they had heard.

Researcher Melvin Harris examined the tapes of Flint's direct-voice mediumship and wrote "I have to conclude that his spirits are awfully mixed up. His Valentino speaks with a stage French accent – shades of Charles Boyer – while his George Bernard Shaw sounds like an irascible English colonel, with no trace of his precise and memorable soft Irish brogue." Harris believed Flint to be a fraud and compared his mediumship to the fraudulent medium William Roy.

In 1970 William Rauscher and Allen Spraggett attended a sitting with Flint in New York and said that Flint's mediumship was a disaster as the spirit voices sounded exactly like Flint.

Flint once gave an interview live for the BBC radio. He was asked by the interviewer to try to get in contact with spirits but failed the test.

== See also ==
- Frederick Tansley Munnings

== Bibliography ==
- Sanderson, Mark (1996). Don't Look Now. London: British Film Institute. ISBN 0-85170-572-3.
