= Linda Gazzera =

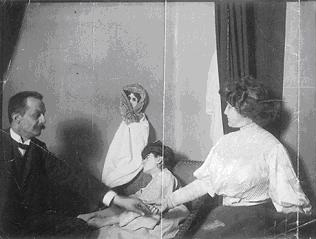
Linda Gazzera with a doll as her 'materialization'.

Linda Gazzera (1890, Italy - 1942, Brazil) was an Italian spiritualist medium.

During 1908–1909, Gazzera was investigated in a series of séances by the spiritualist Enrico Imoda who endorsed her alleged materializations as genuine. Photographs were taken, they were later published in a posthumous book entitled Fotografie di Fantasmi in 1912. French psychical researcher Guillaume de Fontenay in an afterword for the book cast doubt on the authenticity of the photographs, noting that the materializations looked dubious and two-dimensional with suspicious shadows.

Skeptical author Joseph McCabe has written that Gazzera was exposed as a fraud in 1911. According to McCabe "Her materializations and tricks were simple. She brought her birds and flowers and muslin and masks (or pictures) in her hair (which was largely false, and never examined) and her under-clothing, and she, by a common trick, released her hands and feet from control to manipulate them."

In 2022, the counterfeit photographs were included in the exhibit Corpse orbit for the 59th Venice Biennale.
