= Colin Evans =

Colin Evans may refer to:

- Colin Evans (medium), Welsh Spiritualist medium
- Colin Evans (rugby) (1936–1992), Welsh dual-code rugby player
- Colin Evans, main antagonist of No Good Deed
