= Einer Nielsen =

Danish spiritualist

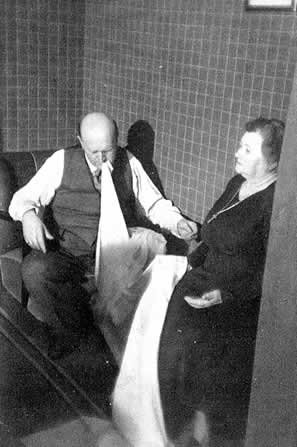
Einer Nielsen

Einer Nielsen (1894–1965) was a Danish physical medium and spiritualist.

== Life ==
Nielsen was born in Copenhagen, Denmark. He travelled in Europe giving séances and claimed to be able to produce spirit materializations. He was originally investigated by the Danish Society for Psychical Research who produced a favourable report of his mediumship. However, the report was disputed by other researchers. Norwegian investigators suspected Nielsen to be a fraud and investigated him in 1922. The committee from the Kristiania University discovered that his ectoplasm was fake. Due to the new report by the Norwegians which was negative and covered strongly by the Danish news media, the original report by the Danish Society for Psychical Research was seen as an embarrassment and several members resigned from the society.

The psychical researcher Harry Price sat with Nielsen in Copenhagen with "unsatisfactory results." Nielsen was also caught hiding his ectoplasm in his rectum. In 1932, Johs Carstensen the leader of Nielsen's spiritualist circle wrote a pamphlet which exposed his tricks. Nielsen continued to work as a medium until his death but was never considered credible again by people outside his small circle of influence. He published the book Solid Proofs of Survival in 1950.
