= Albert von Schrenck-Notzing =

German physician, psychiatrist and psychical researcher

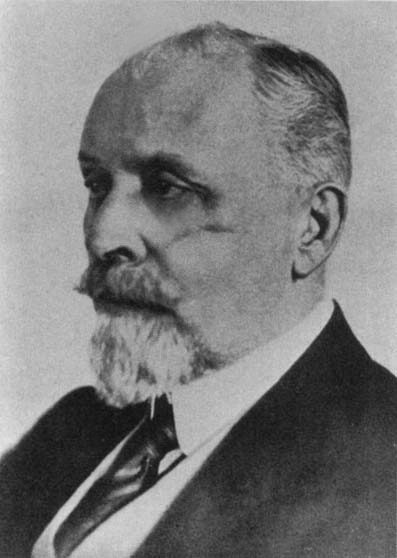
- Born: 18 May 1862
- Died: 12 February 1929 (aged 66)
- Occupations: Physician, psychical researcher

Albert Freiherr von Schrenck-Notzing (18 May 1862 – 12 February 1929) was a German physician, psychiatrist and notable psychical researcher, who devoted his time to the study of paranormal events connected with mediumship, hypnotism and telepathy. He investigated Spiritualist mediums such as Willi Schneider, Rudi Schneider, and Valentine Dencausse. Prior to his exposure as a fraud, Schrenk-Notzig would entertain famous and prestigious clients, including Elisabeth Petznek, the daughter of the late Crown Prince Rudolf von Habsburg He is credited as the first forensic psychologist by Guinness World Records.

== Eva C ==
Schrenck-Notzing investigated the medium Eva Carrière and believed the ectoplasm she produced was genuine. However, Schrenck-Notzing did not believe her ectoplasm "materializations" were anything to do with spirits, he claimed they were the result of "ideoplasty" in which the medium could form images onto ectoplasm from her mind. Schrenck-Notzing published the book Phenomena of Materialisation in English translation (1920), which included photographs of the ectoplasm. Critics pointed out that the photographs of the ectoplasm revealed marks of magazine cut-outs, pins and a piece of string.

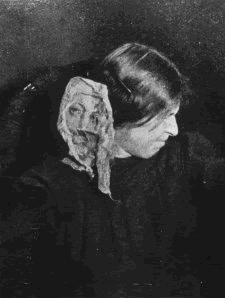
Eva C. (1912)

The psychiatrist Mathilde Ludendorff wrote that the experiments of Schrenck-Notzing were unscientific and that he had been duped by tricks of Carrière. In the Schrenck-Notzing experiments with Carrière the scientific controls were scarce and there was evidence that she had freed her hands in the séance room. Harry Price wrote the photographs of her ectoplasm taken with Schrenck-Notzing look artificial and two-dimensional made from cardboard and newspaper portraits and that there were no scientific controls as both her hands were free. In 1920 Carrière was investigated by the Society for Psychical Research in London. An analysis of her ectoplasm revealed it to be made of chewed paper. She was also investigated in 1922 and the results of the tests were negative.

Schrenck-Notzing admitted that on several occasions Carrière deceptively smuggled pins into the séance room. The magician Carlos María de Heredia replicated the ectoplasm of Carrière using a comb, gauze and a handkerchief.

Donald West wrote that the ectoplasm of Carrière was fake and was made of cut-out paper faces from newspapers and magazines on which fold marks could sometimes be seen from the photographs. A photograph of Carrière taken from the back of the ectoplasm face revealed it to be made from a magazine cut out with the letters "Le Miro". The two-dimensional face had been clipped from the French magazine Le Miroir. Back issues of the magazine also matched some of Carrière's ectoplasm faces. In 1913 Miss Barkley in an article in the newspaper Neue Wiener Tagblatt had exposed the fraud of Carrière:

Miss Eva prepared the heads before every séance, and endeavoured to make them unrecognizable. A clean-shaven face was decorated with a beard. Grey hairs became black curls, a broad forehead was made into a narrow one. But, in spite of all her endeavours, she could not obliterate certain characteristic lines.

Cut out faces that she used included Woodrow Wilson, King Ferdinand of Bulgaria, French president Raymond Poincaré and the actress Mona Delza. After Schrenck-Notzing discovered Carrière had taken her ectoplasm faces from the magazine he defended her by claiming she had read the magazine but her memory had recalled the images and they had materialized into the ectoplasm. Because of this Schrenck-Notzing was described as credulous. Joseph McCabe noted that "In Germany and Austria, Baron von Schrenck-Notzing is the laughing-stock of his medical colleagues."

== Ladislas Lasslo ==
The Hungarian medium Ladislas Lasslo (also known as Laszlo Laszlo) confessed that all of his spirit materializations were fraudulent in 1924. A séance sitter was also found to be working as a confederate for Lasslo. Lasslo who was originally endorsed as genuine by Schrenck-Notzing was a pickpocket and army deserter. During his séances he confessed to hiding "spirit heads" made from pieces of gauze in Schrenck-Notzing's pocket or in the seat of his armchair.

== Karl Kraus ==
Karl Kraus (pseudo Karl Weber) was a medium that was exposed as a fraud by Professor Hans Thirring in Vienna in 1924. However, Kraus had been endorsed by Schrenck-Notzing as genuine. Kraus would later write a manuscript about his mediumship. He admitted that he had set out to deceive Schrenck-Notzing to reveal the inefficiency of psychical research. In 1928 Harry Price obtained the Kraus manuscript. Some of the manuscript was later reprinted by the American Society for Psychical Research and Schrenck-Notzing was charged of being a credulous investigator.

== Fraud ==
In 1954, the SPR member Rudolf Lambert published a report revealing details about a case of fraud that was covered up by many early members of the Institute Metapsychique International (IMI). Lambert who had studied Gustav Geley's files on Eva Carrière discovered photographs depicting fraudulent ectoplasm taken by her companion Juliette Bisson. Various "materializations" were artificially attached to Eva's hair by wires. The discovery was never published by Geley. Eugéne Osty (the director of the institute) and members Jean Meyer, Albert von Schrenck-Notzing and Charles Richet all knew about the fraudulent photographs but were firm believers in mediumship phenomena so demanded the scandal be kept secret.

== Published works ==
- "Der Fall Sauter (Mordversuch und suggerirte Anstiftung zu neunfachem Morde) Verhandlung vor dem oberbayrischen Schwurgericht in München am 2. Oct. 1899", ('The Sauter Case (Attempted murder and alleged incitement to nine murders) Trial before the Upper Bavarian Jury Court in Munich on October 2, 1899'), Zeitschrift für Hypnotismus, Psychotherapie sowie andere psychophysiologische und psychopathologische Forschungen, Vol.9, (1900), pp. 321-352.
- Phenomena of Materialisation, 1923
- Therapeutic Suggestion in Psychopathia Sexualis With Special Reference to Contrary Sexual Instinct, 1898 (co-authored with Charles Gilbert Chaddock)
