= Eric Dingwall =

British anthropologist (1890–1986)

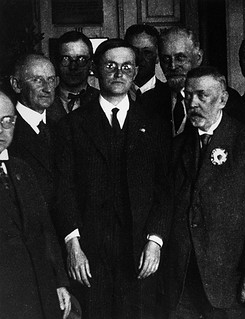
- Dingwall (middle) in 1923
- Born: Eric Dingwall; 1890
- Died: 14 June 1986 (aged 95)
- Occupations: Writer; parapsychologist; researcher; librarian
- Writing career
- Language: English

Eric John Dingwall (1890–1986) was a British anthropologist, psychical researcher and librarian.

== Biography ==
Born in British Ceylon, Dingwall moved to England where he was educated at Pembroke College, Cambridge (M.A., 1912), and the University of London (D.Sc., PhD). He wrote popular books on sexology. He became interested in paranormal phenomena in 1921 and served from 1922 to 1927 as a research officer for the Society for Psychical Research (SPR).

Dingwall was described as an eccentric by those who knew him. Having developed his skills as a librarian at Cambridge University Library while an undergraduate, in 1946 he joined the Library of the British Museum as a voluntary assistant, but from 1947 was promoted to Hon. Assistant Keeper in the Reference Division, cataloguing private case material of erotica, magic and the paranormal. He co-edited the four-volume set Abnormal Hypnotic Phenomena (1967–68). The set was described in a review as of considerable historical interest and well written. His book Racial Pride and Prejudice received positive reviews. His books on artificial cranial deformation and infibulation also received positive reviews.

Dingwall was nicknamed "Dirty Ding" due to his interests in erotica and sexual customs.

He was the honorary vice-president for The Magic Circle and a founding member of its Occult Committee.

Dingwall was married twice; firstly to Doris Dunn, an anthropologist and archaeologist (she later married the anthropologist John Layard); and secondly, to the psychologist Norah Margaret Davis.

Dingwall "came from an affluent family and was astute in financial matters (he left an estate valued at £678,246)". His extensive papers were left to the University of London Library, and a conservation project to catalogue and conserve the collection was funded by the Wellcome Trust in 2012–3. Dingwall had a long interest in antiquarian horology, and had joined the antiquarian section of the British Horological Institute in 1951. He left the British Museum a singing bird automaton and an automaton clock. The bulk of his remaining estate was divided between the British Library and the horological section (the Clocks and Watches department) of the British Museum. This bequest to the museum was used to acquire sixteen further objects for the horological collection. In 1988 the museum proposed combining the remaining funds with part of the bequest left to the Clockmakers Company by Reginald Beloe (a wealth City of London financier, noted horological collector and Past-Master of the Clockmakers Company). Since 1989 the joint fund has supported the annual Dingwall Beloe Lecture Series, held at the British Museum.

== Psychical research ==
In the 1920s and 1930s Dingwall travelled widely in Europe and the United States to investigate mediums. He has been described as a "sceptical enquirer" and a psychical investigator who "spent many years exposing fraud and unscientific practices among psychical researchers."

He co-wrote the skeptical book Four Modern Ghosts (1958) with Trevor H. Hall which gave rationalistic explanations for alleged supernatural phenomena such as the Yorkshire Museum Ghost and Harry Price's Rosalie materialization séance. In his book Critics Dilemma (1966), Dingwall supported Hall's criticism of the spiritualist William Crookes and the medium Florence Cook.

He investigated the mediumship of Eusapia Palladino and came to the conclusion she was "vital, vulgar, amorous and a cheat." In 1920, Dingwall with V. J. Woolley tested the medium Eva Carrière in London. The results were negative and it was discovered that her ectoplasm was made from chewed paper.

Dingwall also investigated the medium Mina Crandon. He suspected that she hid her ectoplasm in her vagina but did not come to any definite conclusion. His suspicion was deemed feasible by the gynecologist Florence Willey.

In his later years Dingwall became a critic of psychical research. In an essay in 1971 he summed up his extensive experience in parapsychological research and came to the conclusion:

Since I gave up nearly all active work in psychical research, I have often been asked why, after more than sixty years' work in the field, I have finally lost most of my interest in it. There are two answers to the question. First, I have come to the conclusion that the present immense interest in occultism and in the grosser forms of superstition is due, to a certain extent at least, to the persistent and far-reaching propaganda put out by the parapsychologists. In this they have, I think, a very grave responsibility. With the gradual decline in the West of belief in Christianity has come not, as one might have hoped, a leaning toward the rational way of looking at the world but a decided tendency to adopt the magical way. Thus Christianity, unbelievable as it may be to the rational mind, has been supported by the occult superstitions of darker ages. One reason, therefore, for my ceasing work is that I do not wish to be associated with persons who actively support such superstitions as are today everywhere apparent. I cannot accept such responsibility... After sixty years' experience and personal acquaintance with most of the leading parapsychologists of that period I do not think I could name half a dozen whom I could call objective students who honestly wished to discover the truth.

His essay The Need for Responsibility in Parapsychology: My Sixty Years in Psychical Research (1971) was reprinted in A Skeptic's Handbook of Parapsychology (1985) by the CSICOP founder Paul Kurtz. The skeptic Gordon Stein dedicated the book The Encyclopedia of the Paranormal to Dingwall.

According to authors William Kalush and Larry Sloman when investigating the medium Mina Crandon; Dingwall told her to take off her clothes and sit in the nude. Crandon would also sometimes sprinkle luminous powder on her breasts and because of such activities William McDougall and other psychical researchers criticised Dingwall for having improper relations with Crandon.

== Publications ==
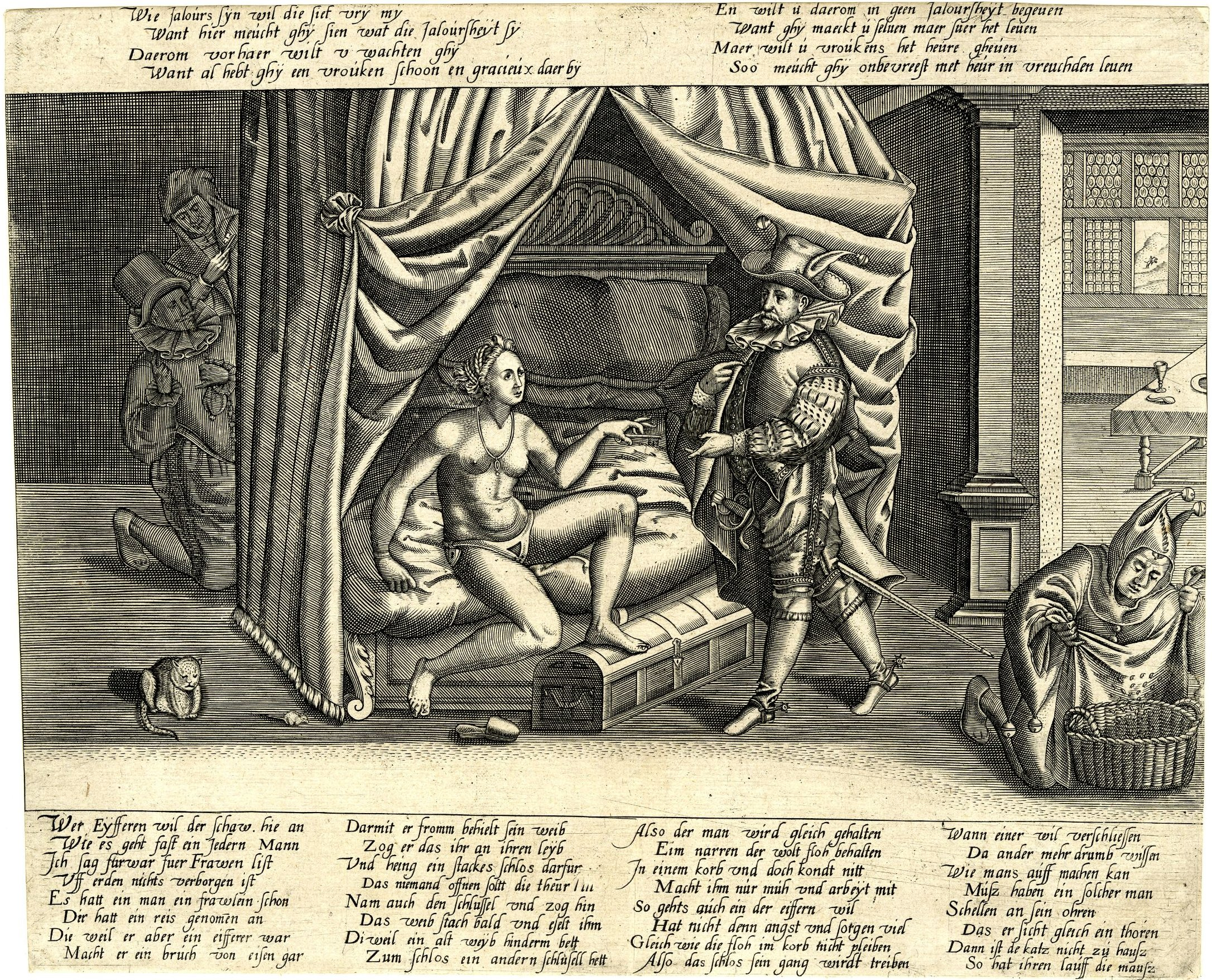
A caricature on the ultimate ineffectualness of chastity belts. According to information in the scholarly work The Girdle of Chastity by Eric John Dingwall, there were a number of versions, but this specific version of the caricature was published c. 1590.

- Abnormal Hypnotic Phenomena four-volumes (1967–68)
- The Critics' Dilemma: Further Comments on Some Nineteenth Century Investigations (1966)
- Very Peculiar People (1962)
- Four Modern Ghosts (1958) [with Trevor H. Hall]
- The Unknown, is it Nearer? (1956)
- The American Women: An Historical Study (1956)
- The Haunting of Borley Rectory: A Critical Survey of the Evidence (1956) with [K. M. Goldney and Trevor H. Hall, commonly referred to as "The Borley Report"]
- Very Peculiar People: Portrait Studies in the Queer, the Abnormal and the Uncanny (1950)
- Racial Pride and Prejudice (1946)
- Woman: An Historical, Gynecological and Anthropological Compendium (1935)
- How to Use a Large Library (1933)
- Artificial Cranial Deformation (1931)
- The Girdle of Chastity (1931)
- Ghosts and Spirits in the Ancient World (1930)
- How to Go to a Medium: A Manual of Instruction (1927)
- Studies in the Sexual Life of Ancient and Medieval Peoples (1925)
- Male Infibulation (1925)
