= Franek Kluski =

Polish physical medium

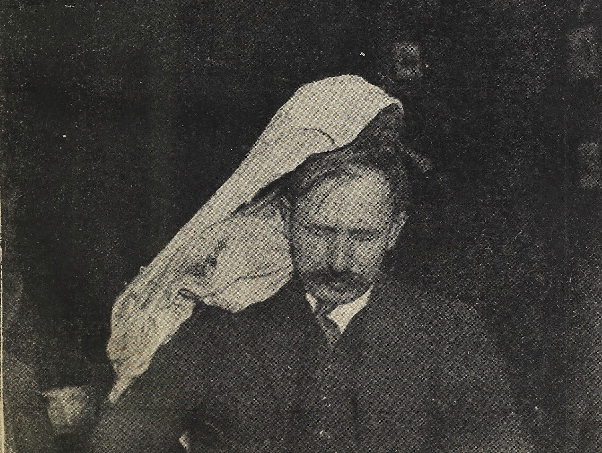
Franek Kluski

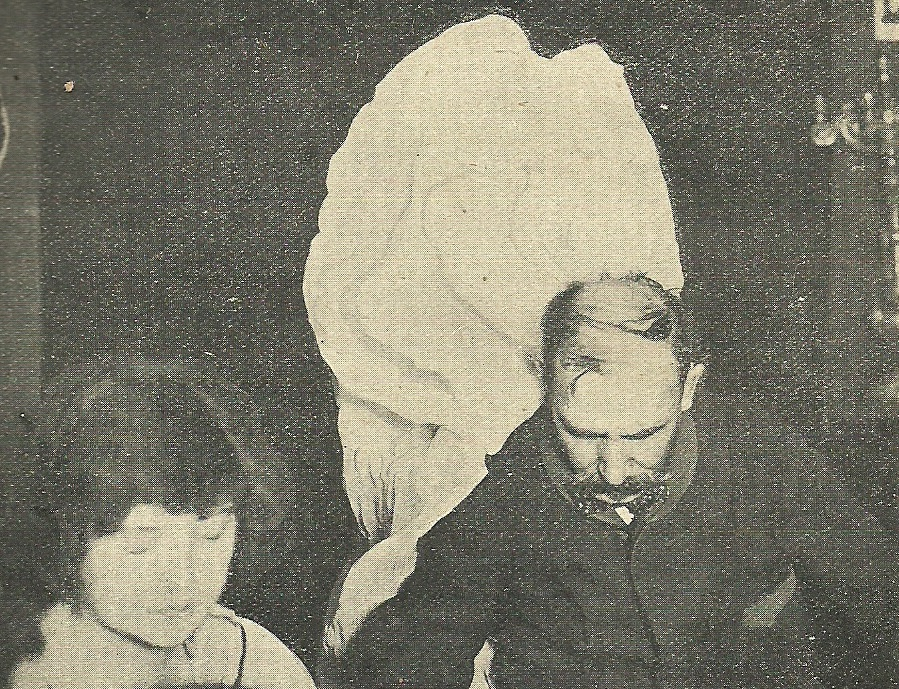
Kluski with cloth phantom

Franek Kluski, real name Teofil Modrzejewski (1873–1943), was a Polish physical medium criticized by trained magicians and skeptics as a fraud. Kluski was best known for his séances in which alleged "spirit" molds of hands materialized. It was later demonstrated by Massimo Polidoro and chemist Luigi Garlaschelli that these molds could have easily been made by fraudulent methods.

== Career ==
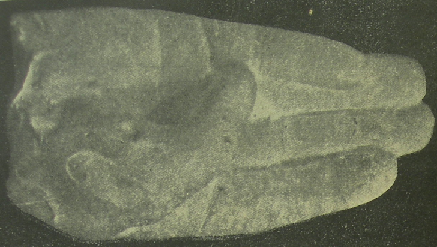
Hand mould from a Kluski seance

Kluski was born in Warsaw. According to French psychical researcher Gustav Geley, Kluski's claimed psychic powers manifested themselves during childhood and after undergoing a psychological change he became Franek Kluski. Kluski's powers during séances were said to include physical manifestation of human limbs and various animals.

Between 8 November and 31 December 1920, Geley of the Institute Metapsychique International attended fourteen séances with Kluski in Paris. A bowl of hot paraffin was placed in the room and according to Kluski spirits dipped their limbs into the paraffin and then into a bath of water to materialize. Three other series of séances were held in Warsaw in Kluski's own apartment, these took place over a period of three years. Kluski was not searched in any of the séances. Photographs of the moulds were obtained during the four series of experiments and were published by Geley in 1924. Skeptics have pointed out that the experiments were not conducted in fraud proof conditions and the moulds could have easily been produced by fraudulent techniques.

Geley has been described as an unreliable investigator. Physician Antônio da Silva Mello noted that Geley "published many writings on ectoplasms and teleplastic phenomena, things which today are quite out of date and totally discredited." Magicians have been able to easily replicate the "materialization" moulds. The magician Carlos María de Heredia revealed how fake materialization hands could be made by using a rubber glove, paraffin and a jar of cold water.

Geley and Arthur Conan Doyle objected to the medium having used a rubber glove. In response, Harry Houdini demonstrated that a glove was not needed as he replicated the Kluski materialization moulds by using his hands and a bowl of hot paraffin.

Harry Price wrote regarding Kluski "His mediumship is unsatisfactory from the point of view that no scientific body has investigated the alleged miracles. On each of my two visits to Warsaw I attempted to obtain sittings with Kluski, without results." Researchers have compared Kluski's mediumship to the medium Eva Carrière and have speculated that he introduced items in the séance room by fraud. A psychical researcher sent a letter to Hereward Carrington claiming Kluski had been detected in fraud.

Massimo Polidoro and Luigi Garlaschelli have produced wax-moulds directly from one's hand which were exactly the same copies as Geley obtained from Kluski, which are kept at the Institute Metapsychique International.

== Fraud incident ==
In a notable incident during a séance that Paul Heuzé attended the medium was requested to produce a face impression. However, a large-sized buttocks impression was found in the wax. It was alleged by a séance sitter that "Kluski dropped... his pants and placed his buttocks in the paraffin".

Heuze believed the impression was Kluski's. This was later confirmed as it was discovered that Kluski had suffered from a burnt buttocks for many days after the incident.

== Confession ==
Some later authors have written about an alleged confession from Kluski. In his book Sixty Years of Psychical Research (1950), magician Joseph Rinn claimed that Kluski had confessed to fraud.

In 1978, researcher Melvin Harris also noted that Kluski had confessed to fraud.
