= Eugène Osty =

French physician and psychical researcher

Eugéne Osty
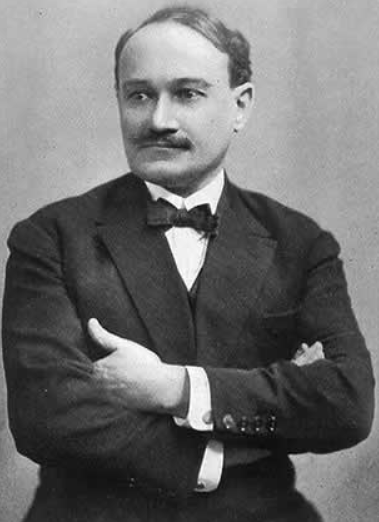
- Born: 16 May 1874
- Died: 20 August 1938 (aged 64)
- Occupation: Psychical researcher

Eugène Osty (16 May 1874 – 20 August 1938) was a French physician and psychical researcher.

== Career ==
Osty was the director of the Institut Métapsychique International in Paris (1924-1938). In 1930, Stanisława P. was discredited at the Institut Métapsychique by Osty as she was caught cheating. Secret flashlight photographs that were taken revealed that her hand was free and she had moved objects on the séance table. He also investigated the medium Jan Guzyk, supporting favourable conclusions. This was in opposition to other researchers who declared Guzyk to be fraudulent.

He also investigated the clairvoyant Pascal Forthuny, supporting a favourable conclusion. Osty was known for his experiments in psychometry but his methods were criticized as non-scientific.

Osty was originally on friendly terms with the British psychical researcher Harry Price, even Vice-President for his National Laboratory of Psychical Research. However, he became involved in a bitter dispute over an alleged exposure of the medium Rudi Schneider, causing him to resign from the laboratory and publish attacks on Price.

Osty conducted a series of experiments with Schneider in 1930 at the Institut Métapsychique and considered his psychokinetic phenomena to be genuine. This was disputed by skeptical researchers. D. H. Rawcliffe for example noted that "various discrepancies have come to light which throw the whole of Osty's experiments into doubt. Price made a prolonged investigation of Rudi Schneider and proved conclusively that the medium resorted to trickery when he believed himself to be unobserved... Osty has too often shown in the past, despite some intellectual ability, evidence of an amateurish and uncritical approach to his subject."

== Controversy ==
In 1954, Rudolf Lambert in the Journal of the Society for Psychical Research claimed that Osty had shown him some suspicious photographs of the medium Eva Carrière depicting fraudulent materializations that were artificially attached to her hair by wires. Osty and other members of the Institut Métapsychique had known about the photographs but had chosen not to publish them. According to Lambert "Osty also told me that he wanted to publish his discovery. As, however, Richet and Schrenk-Notzing protested energetically against it, and M. Jean Meyer, a militant spiritualist who financed the Institut Metapsychique, also forcibly demanded the concealment of the scandal, Osty had to give up the idea of publishing his discovery."

== Selected publications ==
- Supernormal Faculties in Man (London: Methuen, 1923)
- Les Pouvoirs inconnus de l'Esprit sur la Matiére (The Unknown Powers of Mind Over Matter, 1932)
