= Frederick Tansley Munnings =

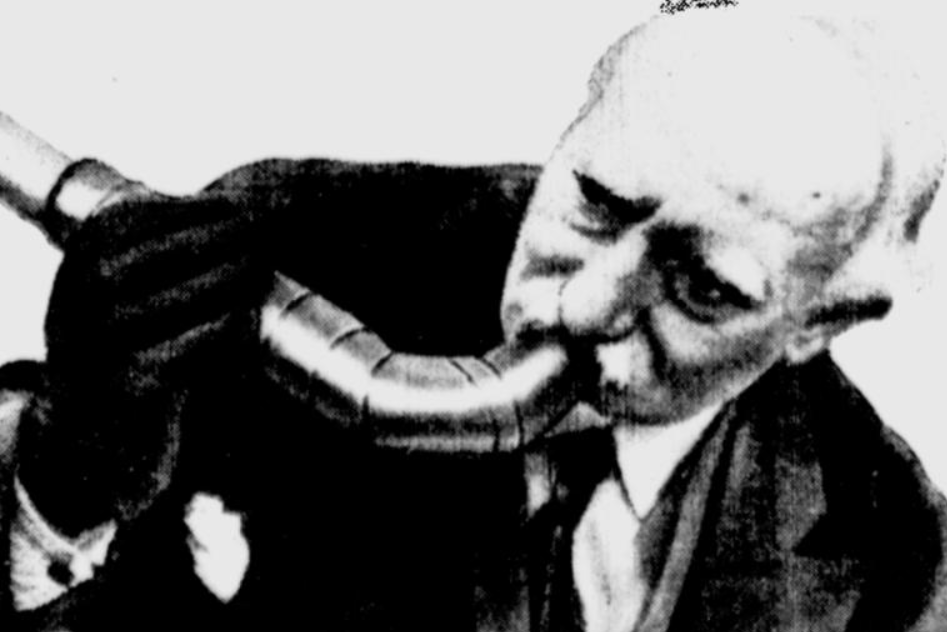
Frederick Tansley Munnings with trumpet.

Frederick Tansley Munnings (1875, Lowestoft – 1953) was a 20th-century British spiritualist medium and former burglar. He was exposed as a fraud.

== Career ==
Munnings lived in Hastings and worked as a boarding-house keeper. He was convicted of burglary for housebreaking at Woking and was sentenced to nine months' imprisonment. Munnings claimed to be a "direct voice" medium, but was exposed as a fraud when one of his séance sitters turned the lights on, revealing him to be holding a trumpet by means of a telescopic extension piece and using an angle piece to change the auditory effect of his voice.

In February 1926 a public warning against Munnings was issued in the press by Arthur Conan Doyle, Abraham Wallace, R. H. Saunders, and H. D. Bradley. The psychical researcher Harry Price also exposed his fraudulent mediumship. Munnings claimed to produce the independent "spirit" voices of Julius Caesar, Dan Leno, Hawley Harvey Crippen and King Henry VIII. Price invented and used a piece of apparatus known as a voice control recorder and proved that all the voices were those of Munnings. Munnings admitted fraud and sold his confessions to a Sunday newspaper.

Munnings's daughter Hilda Tansley Munnings became a noted ballerina under the name Lydia Sokolova.
