= Ectoplasm (paranormal) =

Substance in spiritualism

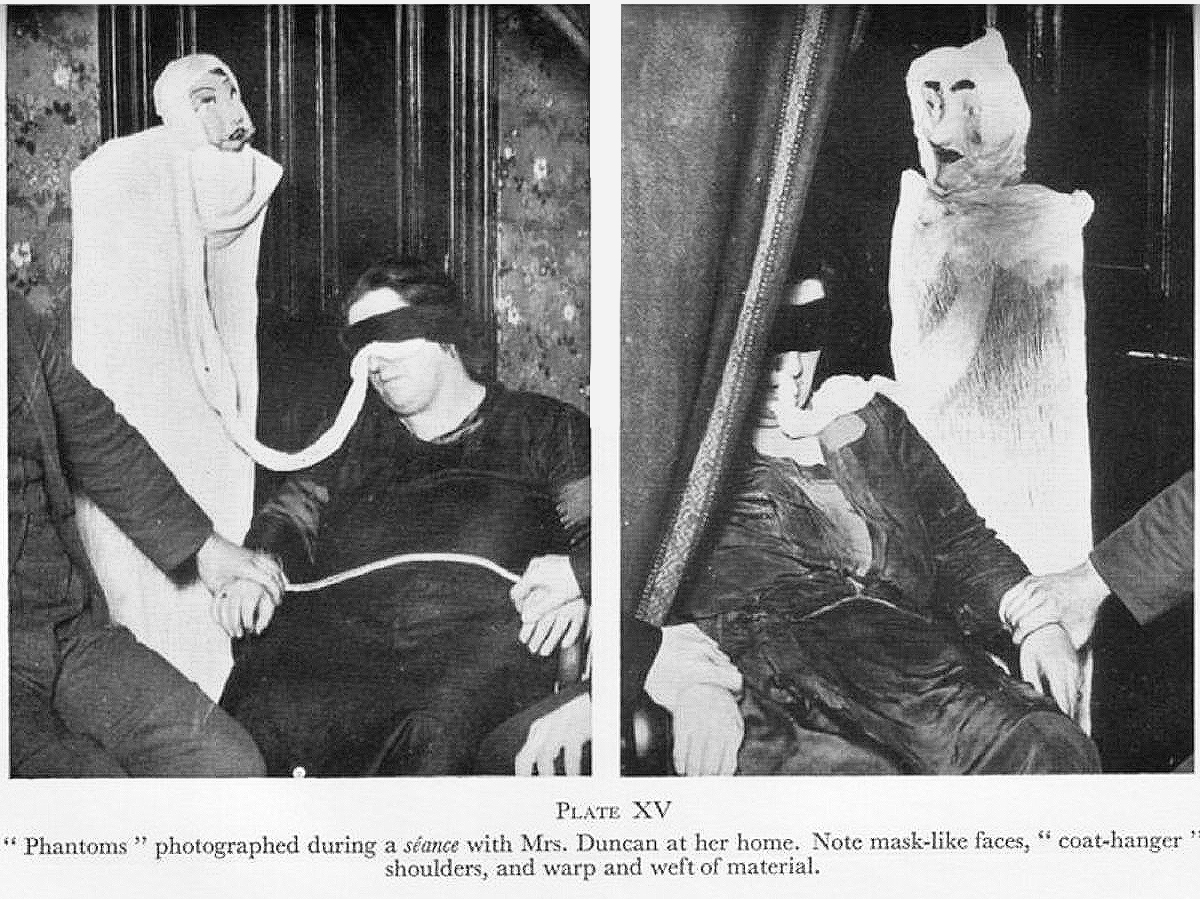
Helen Duncan was well known for using dolls and other props as ectoplasm in her sessions.

In spiritualism, ectoplasm, also known as simply ecto, is a substance or spiritual energy "exteriorized" by physical mediums. It was coined in 1894 by psychical researcher Charles Richet. The parapsychological term is also found in popular culture; however, there is currently no scientific evidence that ectoplasm exists. Some purported examples have been exposed as hoaxes fashioned from cheesecloth, gauze or other natural substances.

The term comes from the Ancient Greek words ἐκτός ektos, "outside" and πλάσμα plasma, "something formed".

== Phenomenon ==
In spiritualism, ectoplasm is said to be formed by physical mediums when in a trance state. This material is excreted as a gauze-like substance from orifices on the medium's body and spiritual entities are said to drape this substance over their nonphysical body, enabling them to interact in the physical and real universe. Some accounts claim that ectoplasm begins clear and almost invisible, but darkens and becomes visible as the psychic energy becomes stronger. Still other accounts state that in extreme cases ectoplasm will develop a strong odor. According to some mediums, the ectoplasm cannot occur in light conditions as the ectoplasmic substance would disintegrate.

The psychical researcher Gustav Geley defined ectoplasm as being "very variable in appearance, being sometimes vaporous, sometimes a plastic paste, sometimes a bundle of fine threads, or a membrane with swellings or fringes, or a fine fabric-like tissue". Arthur Conan Doyle described ectoplasm as "a viscous, gelatinous substance which appeared to differ from every known form of matter in that it could solidify and be used for material purposes".

The physical existence of ectoplasm has not been scientifically demonstrated, and tested samples purported to be ectoplasm have been found to be various non-paranormal substances. Other researchers have duplicated, with non-supernatural materials, the photographic effects sometimes said to prove the existence of ectoplasm.

== Ectenic force ==
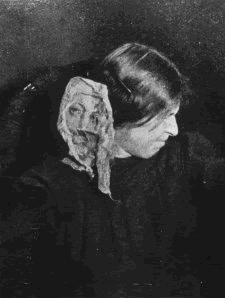
Eva Carrière with fake ectoplasm made from a news photo (1912)

The idea of ectoplasm was merged into the notion of an "ectenic force" by some early psychical researchers who were seeking a physical explanation for reports of psychokinesis in sessions. Its existence was initially hypothesized by Count Agenor de Gasparin (1810–1871) to explain the phenomena of table turning and tapping during séances. Ectenic force was named by de Gasparin's colleague M. Thury, a professor of natural history at the Academy of Geneva. Between them, de Gasparin and Thury conducted a number of experiments in ectenic force, and claimed some success. Their work was not independently verified.

Other psychical researchers who studied mediumship speculated that within the human body an unidentified fluid termed the "psychode", "psychic force" or "ecteneic force" existed and was capable of being released to influence matter. This view was held by Camille Flammarion and William Crookes; however, a later psychical researcher Hereward Carrington pointed out that the fluid was hypothetical and has never been discovered.

The psychical investigator W. J. Crawford (1881–1920) had claimed that a fluid substance was responsible for levitation of objects after witnessing the medium Kathleen Goligher. Crawford, after witnessing a number of her séances, claimed to have obtained flashlight photographs of the substance; he later described the substance as "plasma". He claimed the substance is not visible to the naked eye but can be felt by the body.

The physicist and psychical researcher Edmund Edward Fournier d'Albe later investigated the medium Kathleen Goligher at many sittings and arrived at the opposite conclusions to Crawford; according to D'Albe, no paranormal phenomena such as levitation had occurred with Goligher and stated he had found evidence of fraud. D'Albe claimed the substance in the photographs of Crawford was ordinary muslin. During a séance D'Albe had observed white muslin between Goligher's feet.

== Fraud ==
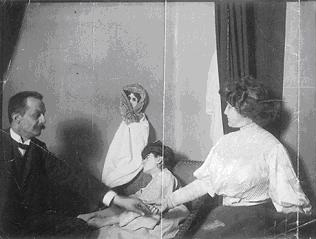
Medium Linda Gazzera with a doll portrayed as ectoplasm

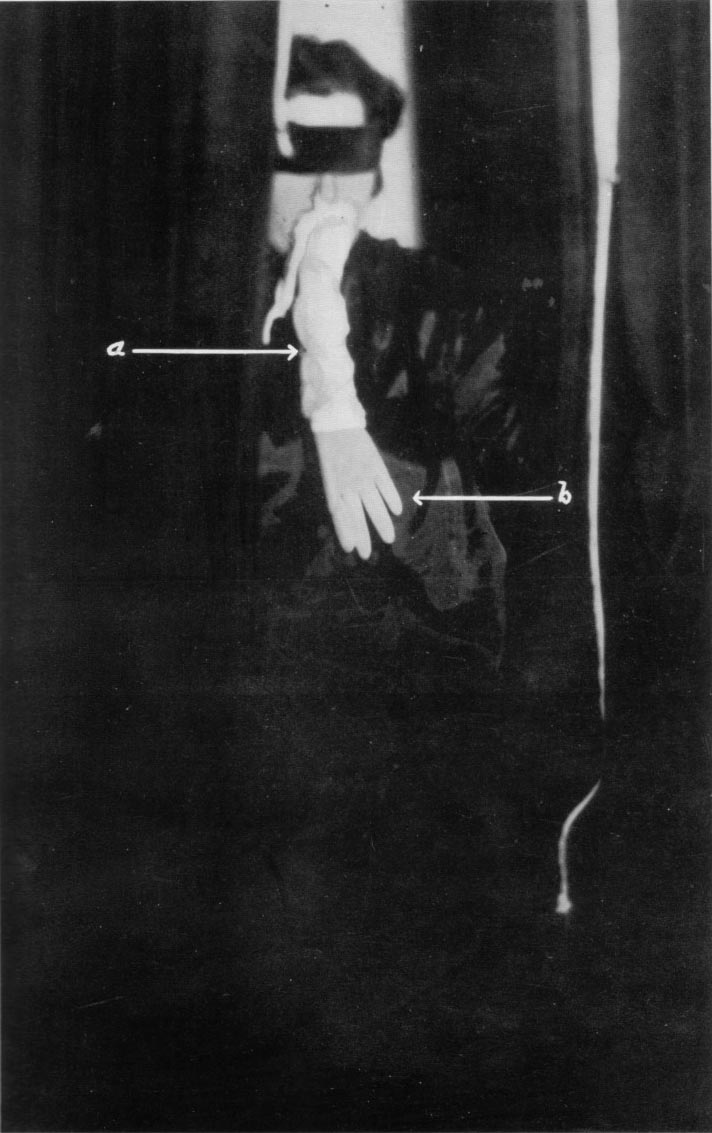
Helen Duncan with supposed ectoplasm, analysed by Harry Price to be made of cheesecloth and a rubber glove

Ectoplasm on many occasions has been proven to be fraudulent. Many mediums had used methods of swallowing and regurgitating cheesecloth, textile products smoothed with potato starch and in other cases the ectoplasm was made from paper, cloth and egg white or butter muslin.

The Society for Psychical Research investigations into mediumship exposed many fraudulent mediums which contributed to the decline of interest in physical mediumship. In 1907, Hereward Carrington exposed the tricks of fraudulent mediums such as those used in slate-writing, table-turning, trumpet mediumship, materializations, sealed-letter reading and spirit photography.

In the early 20th century the psychical researcher Albert von Schrenck-Notzing investigated medium Eva Carrière and claimed her ectoplasm "materializations" were not from spirits but the result of "ideoplasty" in which the medium could form images onto ectoplasm from her mind. Schrenck-Notzing published the book Phenomena of Materialisation (1923) which included photographs of the ectoplasm. Critics pointed out the photographs of the ectoplasm revealed marks of magazine cut-outs, pins and a piece of string. Schrenck-Notzing admitted that on several occasions Carrière deceptively smuggled pins into the séance room. Magician Carlos María de Heredia replicated Carrière's ectoplasm using a comb, gauze and a handkerchief.

Donald West wrote that the ectoplasm of Carrière was fake and was made of cut-out paper faces from newspapers and magazines on which fold marks could sometimes be seen from the photographs. A photograph of Carrière taken from the back of the ectoplasm face revealed it to be made from a magazine cut out with the letters "Le Miro". The two-dimensional face had been clipped from the French magazine Le Miroir. Back issues of the magazine also matched some of Carrière's ectoplasm faces. Cut out faces that she used included Woodrow Wilson, King Ferdinand of Bulgaria, French president Raymond Poincaré and the actress Mona Delza.

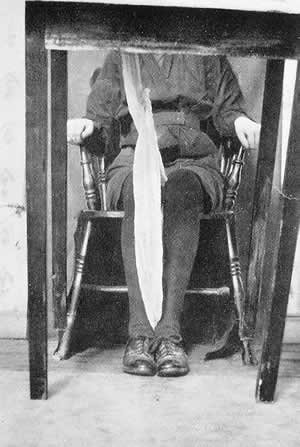
Kathleen Goligher with supposed ectoplasm made of muslin

After Schrenck-Notzing discovered Carrière had taken her ectoplasm faces from the magazine he defended her by claiming she had read the magazine but her memory had recalled the images and they had materialized into the ectoplasm. Because of this Schrenck-Notzing was described as credulous. Joseph McCabe wrote "In Germany and Austria, Baron von Schrenck-Notzing is the laughing-stock of his medical colleagues."

Danish medium Einer Nielsen was investigated by a committee from the Kristiania University in Norway in 1922 and it was discovered in a séance that his ectoplasm was fake. He was also caught hiding ectoplasm in his rectum. Mina Crandon was a famous medium known for producing ectoplasm during her séance sittings. She produced a small ectoplasmic hand from her stomach which waved about in the darkness. Her career ended, however, when biologists examined the hand and found it to be made of a piece of carved animal liver. Walter Franklin Prince described the Crandon case as "the most ingenious, persistent, and fantastic complex of fraud in the history of psychic research".

Psychical researchers Eric Dingwall and Harry Price republished an anonymous work by a former medium, entitled Revelations of a Spirit Medium (1922), which exposed the tricks of mediumship and the fraudulent methods of producing "spirit hands". Originally all the copies of the book were bought up by spiritualists and destroyed. On the subject of ectoplasm and fraud, John Ryan Haule wrote:

Because ectoplasm was believed susceptible to destruction by light, the possibility that ectoplasm might appear became a reason for making sure that Victorian séances took place in near darkness. Poor lighting conditions also became an opportunity for fraud, particularly as faux ectoplasm was easy to make with a mixture of soap, gelatin and egg white, or perhaps merely well-placed muslin.

Price exposed medium Helen Duncan's fraudulent techniques by proving, through analysis of a sample of ectoplasm produced by Duncan, that it was cheesecloth that she had swallowed and regurgitated. Duncan had also used dolls' heads and masks as ectoplasm. Mediums would also cut pictures from magazines and stick them to the cheesecloth to pretend they were spirits of the dead. Another researcher, C. D. Broad, wrote that ectoplasm in many cases had proven to be composed of home material such as butter-muslin, and that there was no solid evidence that it had anything to do with spirits.

Photographs taken by Thomas Glendenning Hamilton of ectoplasm reveal it to be made of tissue paper and magazine cut-outs of people. The famous photograph taken by Hamilton of medium Mary Ann Marshall (1880–1963) depicts tissue paper with a cut out of Arthur Conan Doyle's head from a newspaper. Skeptics have suspected that Hamilton may have been behind the hoax. Mediums Rita Goold and Alec Harris dressed up in their séances as ectoplasm spirits and were exposed as frauds. The exposures of fraudulent ectoplasm in séances caused a rapid decline in physical mediumship.

== Spiritism ==
In Brazilian Spiritism, the work of André Luiz, Nos Domínios da Mediunidade (In the Domains of Mediumship), psychographed by Chico Xavier, defines ectoplasm as "(...) situated between dense matter and perispiritual matter, (...) Infinitely plastic, it gives partial or total form to entities that become visible to the eyes of earthly companions or before the photographic lens, it gives consistency to the threads, rods and other types of formations, visible or invisible in levitation phenomena, and it substantiates the images created by the medium's imagination or by companions who assist him, mentally attuned to him."

Medium Divaldo Pereira Franco is mentioned as a protagonist in ectoplasmic manifestations. In January 2017, the social media page of his center Mansão do Caminho shared photos from a 1977 session showing Divaldo expelling ectoplasm from his mouth, which then materialized into flowers. The description says: "On the night of March 9, 1977, the mediumistic session led by Nilson de Sousa Pereira at the Centro Espírita Caminho da Redenção (Mansão do Caminho) recorded a historic series of materializations and physical effects through the medium Divaldo Franco."

== See also ==
- Aura (paranormal)
- Bhoot (ghost)
- Ghost
- Ichor
- Incorporeal
- Kirlian photography
- List of basic parapsychology topics
- Spirit photography
