= Colin Evans (medium) =

20th-century spiritualist

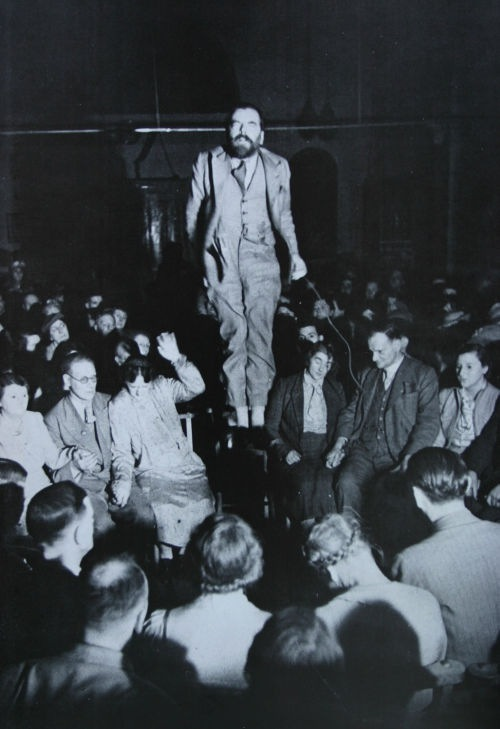
Evans in a séance

Colin Evans (fl. 1930s) was an early 20th-century Welsh spiritualist medium who claimed to have the ability to levitate but was discovered to be a fraud.

== Levitation ==
In a flash-illuminated picture taken at a séance in Wortley Hall, Finsbury Park in 1937 Evans can be seen "levitating" in mid-air. He claimed that the spirits had lifted him. Evans was later discovered to be a fraud, as a cord leading from a device in his hand indicated that he had triggered the flash-photograph himself and that all he had done was jump from his chair into the air and pretend he had levitated. He performed in complete darkness so that sitters in the séance could not see what he was doing. Magicians have pointed out that Evans's blurred feet in the photographs are proof that he simply jumped high into the air.

During another séance held at North Gate Mansions, Regent's Park in 1938, Evans performed the same trick. The attendees were not happy and he had to return the money to those who had paid him.
