= Gustav Geley =

French physician and psychical researcher

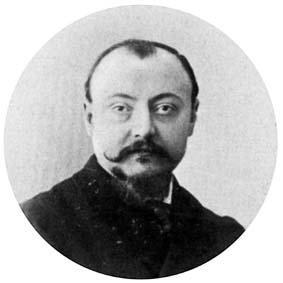
Geley

Gustav Geley (13 April 1868 – 15 July 1924) was a French physician, psychical researcher and director of the Institute Metapsychique International from 1919 to 1924.

== Career ==
Geley was born in 1868 at Montceau-les-Mines, France. He studied medicine in Annecy. In 1919, he gave up his practice as a physician and become the director of the Institut Mètapsychique International. He was a spiritist and a believer in reincarnation.

In the early 20th century Joaquin María Argamasilla known as the "Spaniard with X-ray Eyes" claimed to be able to read handwriting or numbers on dice through closed metal boxes. Argamasilla managed to fool Geley and Charles Richet into believing he had genuine psychic powers. In 1924 he was exposed by Harry Houdini as a fraud. Argamasilla peeked through his simple blindfold and lifted up the edge of the box so he could look inside it without others noticing.

Geley investigated the physical mediumship of Eva Carrière and Franek Kluski, and endorsed the abilities of Carrière. It was reported in the Encyclopedia of Occultism and Parapsychology that Geley's "belief system seems to have made him a target for tricks by the mediums he studied and, in the end, capable of suppressing negative evidence."

In 1954, the SPR member Rudolf Lambert published a report revealing details about a case of fraud that was covered up by many early members of the Institute Metapsychique International (IMI). Lambert who had studied Geley's files on Eva Carrière discovered photographs depicting fraudulent ectoplasm taken by her companion Juliette Bisson. Various "materializations" were artificially attached to Eva's hair by wires. The discovery was never published by Geley. Eugene Osty (the director of the institute) and members Jean Meyer, Albert von Schrenck-Notzing and Charles Richet all knew about the fraudulent photographs but were firm believers in mediumship phenomena so demanded the scandal be kept secret.

According to James Randi, Geley had a "very strong need for belief in the hereafter", as evidenced by Geley's statement, "Robbed of its illusions, individual existence seems a real misfortune if it endures only from birth to death. Geley's book Unconscious to the Conscious has been described as "almost a bible of reincarnationism."

Geley died in an airplane accident on 15 July 1924. He was 56.

== Publications ==
- From the Unconscious to the Conscious (1921)
