= Eva Carrière =

French medium

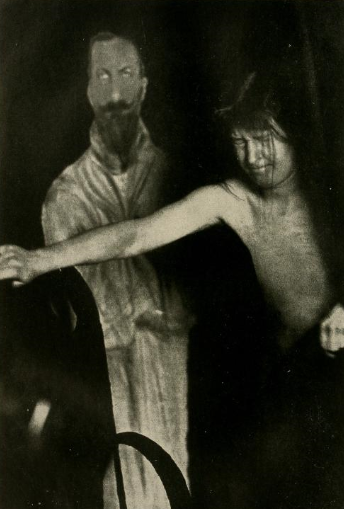
Censored photo of Carrière nude in a séance with a cardboard cut-out figure of King Ferdinand of Bulgaria

Eva Carrière (born Marthe Béraud 1886 in France, died 1943), also known as Eva C, was a fraudulent materialization medium in the early 20th century known for making fake ectoplasm from chewed paper and cut-out faces from magazines and newspapers.

== Biography ==
Béraud was born 1886 in France, the daughter of a French officer. She became engaged to Maurice Noël, a soldier who died in the Congo from tropical disease in 1904 before the marriage could take place. Béraud lived with General Elie Noël and his wife at Villa Carmen in Algiers. She claimed she developed her psychic ability after the death of her fiancé.

In 1905, she held a series of séances at Villa Carmen and sitters were invited. In these séances she claimed to materialize a spirit called Bien Boa, a 300-year-old Brahmin Hindu. However, photographs taken of Boa looked like the figure was made from a large cardboard cutout. In other sittings Charles Richet reported that Boa was breathing, had moved around the room and had touched him. A photograph revealed Boa to be a man dressed up in a cloak, helmet and beard.

A newspaper article in 1906 revealed that an Arab coachman known as Areski, who had previously worked at the villa, had been hired to play the part of Bien Boa and that the entire thing was a hoax. Areski wrote that he made his appearance into the room by a trapdoor. Béraud also admitted to being involved with the hoax.

In 1909, Béraud changed her name to Eva Carrière (Eva C) to hide the fraud of her past and began a new career as a psychic. She had a sexual relationship with a woman 25 years her elder, Juliette Bisson (1861–1956), with whom she performed during her seances.

Beraud died in 1943.

== Investigations ==
Carrière's psychic performances were investigated by Arthur Conan Doyle, author of the Sherlock Holmes mystery series. He believed her performances were genuine and that she was not engaged in any deception. Another famous psychic investigator of the time, Harry Houdini, observed one of her séances and asserted that they were fraudulent. He was never convinced by Carrière and likened her performance to a magician's trick, the Hindu needle trick.

Physician-psychical researcher Gustav Geley investigated Carrière and wrote she was a genuine psychic, but never-published photographs were discovered after Geley's death which revealed fraudulent activity from the psychic's companion, Juliette Bisson, such as wires seen running from Carrière's head supporting fake ectoplasm. Another physician-psychical researcher, Albert von Schrenck-Notzing, investigated Carrière and believed the ectoplasm she produced was genuine. Psychiatrist Mathilde Ludendorff wrote that the experiments of Schrenck-Notzing were unscientific and that he had been duped by tricks of Carrière. In the Schrenck-Notzing psychic sessions with Carrière, the scientific controls were scarce and there was evidence that she had freed her hands in the séance room.

Carrière has been described as "perverse and neurotic". She was well known for running around the séance room naked indulging in sexual activities with her audience. Her companion Juliette Bisson would, during the course of the séance sittings with Schrenck-Notzing, introduce her finger into Eva's vagina to ensure no "ectoplasm" had been loaded there beforehand to fool the investigators, and she would also strip nude at the end of a séance and demanded another full-on gynecological exam. The psychic sessions of Carrière with Schrenck-Notzing have been described as pornographic. Photos taken during the séances show Carrière in the nude emerging from her cabinet and others revealing fake ectoplasm strings hanging from her breasts. Another photograph revealed ectoplasm in the shape of a deflated and disembodied penis. According to historian Ruth Brandon, Juliette Bisson and Carrière were in a sexual relationship, and they worked in collaboration with each other to fake the ectoplasm and eroticize their male audience.

In 1920, anthropologist Eric Dingwall and physician-psychical researcher V. J. Woolley tested Carrière in London. They found no evidence of psychic phenomena, discovered that her ectoplasm was made from chewed paper, and said "the séances proved negative". Ruth Brandon wrote that Carrière produced some of her effects by regurgitation, hiding her ectoplasm in the séance cabinet and using her secret accomplice Bisson.

According to Harry Price, the photographs of her ectoplasm taken with Schrenck-Notzing looked artificial and two-dimensional, made from cardboard and newspaper portraits, and that there were no scientific controls, as both her hands were free. In 1920, Carrière was investigated by the Society for Psychical Research (SPR) in London. She was also investigated in 1922 and the results of the tests were negative.

In 1954, Donald West wrote that Carrière's ectoplasm was made of cut-out paper faces from magazines and newspapers, on which fold marks could sometimes be seen from the photographs. A photograph of Carrière taken from the back of the ectoplasm face revealed it was made from a magazine cut out, complete with the letters "Le Miro". The two-dimensional face had been clipped from the French magazine Le Miroir. Back issues of the magazine also matched some of Carrière's ectoplasm faces. In 1913, a Miss Barkley in an article in the newspaper Neue Wiener Tagblatt exposed the fraud of Carrière:

Miss Eva prepared the heads before every séance, and endeavoured to make them unrecognizable. A clean-shaven face was decorated with a beard. Grey hairs became black curls, a broad forehead was made into a narrow one. In spite of all her endeavours, she could not obliterate certain characteristic lines.

Carrière used cut out faces of Woodrow Wilson, King Ferdinand of Bulgaria, French president Raymond Poincaré, and actress Mona Delza.

In 1954, Rudolf Lambert, an SPR member, published details of fraud which had been suppressed by many early members of the Institute Metapsychique International (IMI). Lambert had studied Gustav Geley's files on Eva Carrière and discovered photographs taken by her companion Juliette Bisson depicting fraudulent ectoplasm. Various "materializations" were artificially attached to Eva's hair by wires. Geley never published his discovery. Eugéne Osty, the director of the Institute, and members Jean Meyer, Albert von Schrenck-Notzing and Charles Richet all knew about the fraudulent photographs, but were firm believers in spirituality phenomena, so demanded the scandal be kept secret.

== Gallery ==
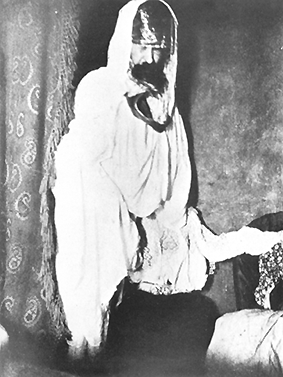
The spirit Bien Boa, which was discovered to be a dressed-up man

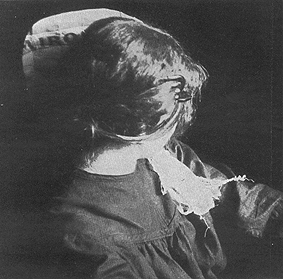
Carrière with fake ectoplasm made from the French magazine Le Miroir

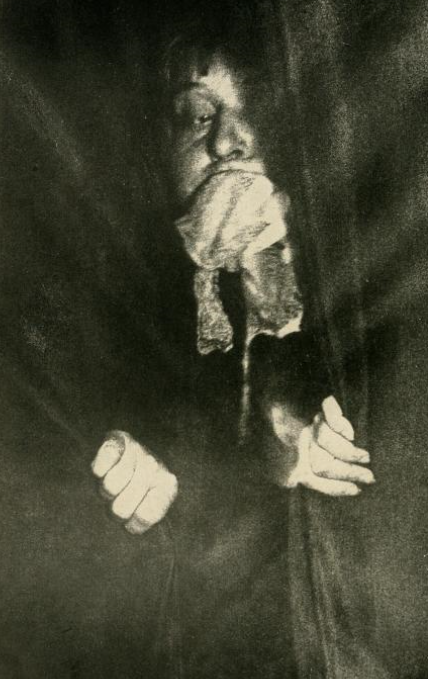
Carrière during a séance

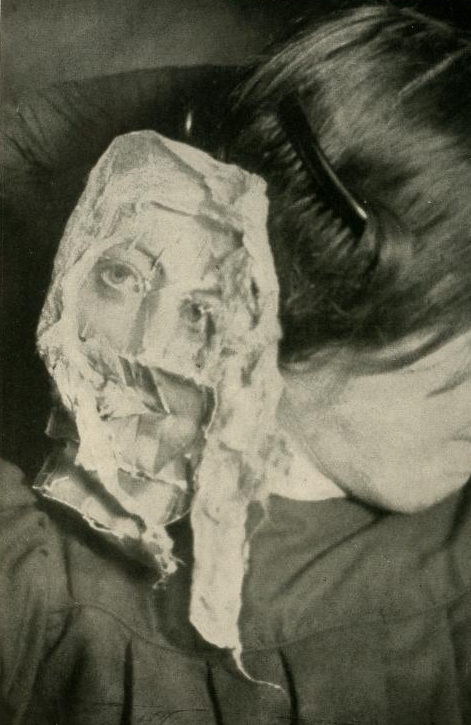
Carrière with fake ectoplasm

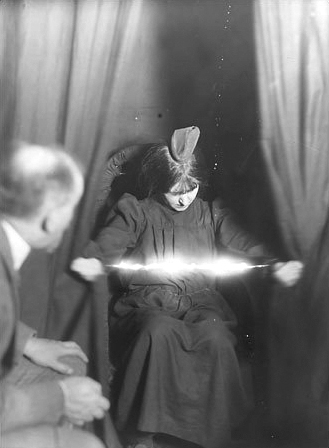
Carrière with light between hands

== See also ==
- Spirituality
- Spiritualism
- Psychokinesis
- Fraud
