= Materialization (paranormal) =

Alleged creation or appearance of matter from unknown sources

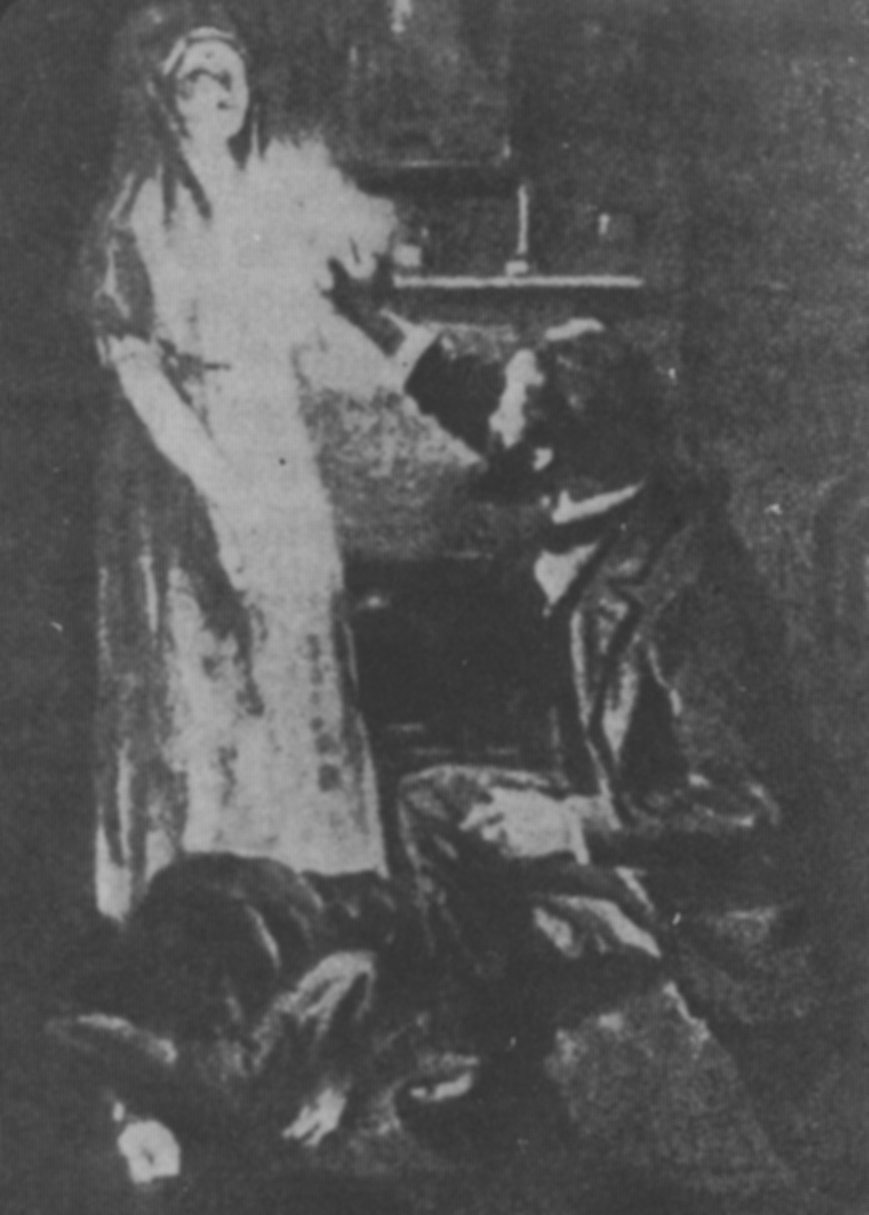
A depiction of Sir William Crookes confronting the alleged spirit materialization of Katie King

In Spiritualism, paranormal literature and some religions, materialization (or manifestation) is the creation or appearance of matter from unknown sources. The existence of materialization has not been confirmed by laboratory experiments. Numerous cases of fraudulent materialization demonstrations by mediums have been exposed.

== History ==
In the early 20th century a series of exposures of fraudulent activity led to a decline of materialization séances. The poet Robert Browning and his wife Elizabeth attended a séance on 23, July 1855 in Ealing with the Rymers. During the séance a spirit face materialized which Home claimed was the son of Browning who had died in infancy. Browning seized the "materialization" and discovered it to be the bare foot of Home. To make the deception worse, Browning had never lost a son in infancy. Browning's son Robert, in a letter to The Times on 5 December 1902, referred to the incident and said that "Home was detected in a vulgar fraud."

The British materialization medium Rosina Mary Showers was caught in many fraudulent séances throughout her career. In 1874, during a séance with Edward William Cox, a sitter looked into the cabinet and seized the spirit, the head dress fell off and was revealed to be Showers. On March 29 and May 21, 1874 Florence Cook in her own Home held séances with William Crookes. It was alleged that a spirit called "Katie King" materialized, however according to the author Walter Mann "Katie was a confederate introduced by Florrie Cook. It was the easiest matter in the world to carry out this trick, since the room, described by Sir William as the 'cabinet', was Florrie Cook's bedroom."

Frank Herne. a medium who formed a partnership with Charles Williams, was repeatedly exposed in fraudulent materialization séances. In 1875, he was caught pretending to be a spirit during a séance in Liverpool and was found "clothed in about two yards of stiffened muslin, wound round his head and hanging down as far as his thigh". Florence Cook had been "trained in the arts of the séance" by Herne and was repeatedly exposed as a fraudulent medium.

The psychical researchers W. W. Baggally and Everard Feilding exposed the British materialization medium Christopher Chambers as a fraud in 1905. A false moustache was discovered in the séance room which he used to fabricate the spirit materializations. The British medium Charles Eldred was exposed as a fraud in 1906. Eldred would sit in a chair in a curtained off area in the room known as a "séance cabinet". Various spirit figures would emerge from the cabinet and move around the séance room, however, it was discovered that the chair had a secret compartment that contained beards, cloths, masks, and wigs that Eldred would dress up in to fake the spirits.

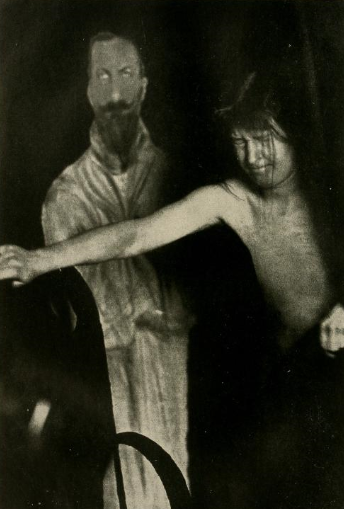
Eva Carrière with cardboard cut out figure of King Ferdinand of Bulgaria

Albert von Schrenck-Notzing investigated the medium Eva Carrière and said that her reputed ectoplasm materializations were the result of "ideoplasty" in which the medium could form images onto ectoplasm from her mind. Schrenck-Notzing published the book Phenomena of Materialisation (1923) which included photographs of the ectoplasm. Critics pointed out the photographs of the ectoplasm revealed marks of magazine cut-outs, pins and a piece of string. Schrenck-Notzing admitted that on several occasions Carrière deceptively smuggled pins into the séance room. The magician Carlos María de Heredia replicated the ectoplasm of Carrière using a comb, gauze and a handkerchief.

Donald West wrote that the ectoplasm of Carrière was fake and was made of cut-out paper faces from newspapers and magazines on which fold marks could sometimes be seen from the photographs. A photograph of Carrière taken from the back of the ectoplasm face revealed it to be made from a magazine cut out with the letters "Le Miro". The two-dimensional face had been clipped from the French magazine Le Miroir. Back issues of the magazine also matched some of Carrière's ectoplasm faces. Cut out faces that she used included Woodrow Wilson, King Ferdinand of Bulgaria, French president Raymond Poincaré and the actress Mona Delza.

After Schrenck-Notzing discovered Carrière had taken her ectoplasm faces from the magazine he defended her by claiming she had read the magazine but her memory had recalled the images and they had materialized into the ectoplasm. Because of this Schrenck-Notzing was described as credulous. Joseph McCabe wrote "In Germany and Austria, Baron von Schrenck-Notzing is the laughing-stock of his medical colleagues."

In 1907, Hereward Carrington exposed the tricks of fraudulent mediums such as those used in slate-writing, table-turning, trumpet mediumship, materializations, sealed-letter reading and spirit photography. Between 8 November and 31 December 1920 Gustav Geley of the Institute Metapsychique International attended fourteen séances with the medium Franek Kluski in Paris. A bowl of hot paraffin was placed in the room and according to Kluski spirits dipped their limbs into the paraffin and then into a bath of water to materialize. Three other series of séances were held in Warsaw in Kluski's own apartment, these took place over a period of three years. Kluski was not searched in any of the séances. Photographs of the molds were obtained during the four series of experiments and were published by Geley in 1924. Human skin hairs were found on the moulds which has indicated fraud. Harry Houdini replicated the Kluski materialization moulds by using his hands and a bowl of hot paraffin.

Erlendur Haraldsson investigated one of the Hindu swamis, who are associated with frequent and widely accepted claims of materializations of objects or substances, namely Gyatri Swami, and reached a negative conclusion regarding his claims.

Indian gurus Sathya Sai Baba (died 2011) and Swami Premananda have claimed to perform materializations. Spontaneous vibuthi (holy ash) manifestations are reported by Sai Baba's followers on his pictures at their homes. Skeptics have suspected the materializations of Sathya Sai Baba were fraudulent and the result of sleight of hand tricks. The magician P. C. Sorcar wrote Sai Baba's vibhuti feat was a "common trick" conjured with an ash capsule.

== See also ==
- Apport – Paranormal transference
- Evocation – Western tradition of summoning a spirit, demon, god
- Psychokinesis – Influencing of objects without physical interaction, with one's mind
- Siddhi – Spiritual attainments in Indian religions
- Spiritism – 1885 book by Eduard von Hartmann
- Teleportation – Science fiction transportation concept
