= Ercole Chiaia =

Italian spiritualist (1836 – 1905)

Ercole Chiaia

Ercole Chaia (1836 – 1905) was an Italian spiritualist who became particularly well known for working as manager of the medium Eusapia Palladino. He was responsible for convincing the reputed scientist Cesare Lombroso to attend Palladino's séances, as well as for organising her séance tours in several European countries.

== Biography ==
Born in Brindisi, he completed his early studies in a seminary before moving to Naples and, later, to Bari to attend medical lectures. Characterized by a versatile personality, he dedicated himself to the fine arts (specifically music and drawing), and had a brief military career in the Lancers of Florence and the Hussars of Piacenza. He eventually settled permanently in Naples, where he engaged in industrial and commercial activities.

=== Psychical research and Eusapia Palladino ===
Plaster reliefs of facial impressions attributed to spiritual entities, obtained by Ercole Chiaia from the clay moulds produced during the mediumistic séances of Eusapia Palladino.

Starting from the second half of the nineteenth century, Chiaia became the primary driving force behind the Neapolitan spiritualist movement. His fundamental contribution to the field was the discovery and promotion of the famous medium from Apulia, Eusapia Palladino, whom he rescued from illiteracy and introduced to a context of rigorous experimentation.

In his Neapolitan home, Chiaia organized countless mediumistic séances, introducing an experimental research method aimed at producing objective evidence of physical phenomena. Among the techniques he devised was the use of basins containing soft clay, inside of which Palladino – during a state of trance – managed to imprint detailed casts of faces, hands, and fingers, thereby ruling out the possibility of crude trickery.

During these sessions, phenomena such as levitation, apports, the sounding of musical instruments, and the appearance of dark protrusions (ectoplasms) were also documented.

=== The scientific debate ===
Convinced that mediumistic phenomena should be investigated by scientific community rather than dismissed as superstition, in 1888 Chiaia launched a famous public challenge to Cesare Lombroso and other scientists of the positivistic era, inviting them to personally verify Palladino's faculties.

The case I allude to is that of an invalid woman who belongs to the humblest class of society. She is nearly thirty years old and very ignorant; her look is neither fascinating nor endowed with the power which modern criminologists call irresistible; but when she wishes, be it by day or by night, she can divert a curious group for an hour or so with the most surprising phenomena.

— Ercole Chiaia, from A challenge for science. Letter to Professor Lombroso, in "Fanfulla della domenica", August 19, 1888

After initial skepticism from the academic world, in 1891 Cesare Lombroso accepted the invitation and traveled to Naples along with other scholars, including the Spanish physician Manuel Otero Acevedo. Faced with the experimental evidence, Lombroso publicly capitulated, declaring:

I am very ashamed and grieved to have opposed with such tenacity the possibility of the so-called spiritualistic facts; I say facts because I am still opposed to the theory. But the facts exist, and I boast of being a slave to facts.

— Cesare Lombroso, from a letter to Ernesto Ciolfi, in The latest experiments in spiritism, "La Tribuna Giudiziaria", July 5, 1891

Thanks to Chiaia's relentless promotional efforts, Palladino was subsequently studied by other eminent figures of international science during major investigation campaigns across Europe: in Milan by Giovanni Schiaparelli, Brofferio and Ermacora, in Paris by Charles Richet, Pierre Curie and Camille Flammarion, in Warsaw by Julian Ochorowicz, in Cambridge by Frederic W. H. Myers and Oliver Lodge, etc.

=== Death and legacy ===
Following his death in 1905, a solemn public commemoration was held in Naples. The parapsychology journal Luce e Ombra joined the tribute, dedicating its entire September issue to him, which included speeches by Francesco Zingaropoli, Henry Morselli, Victorien Sardou, Lombroso himself, alongside numerous letters of recognition from the academic and scientific community of the era.
