= Eusapia Palladino =

Italian spiritualist (1854–1918)

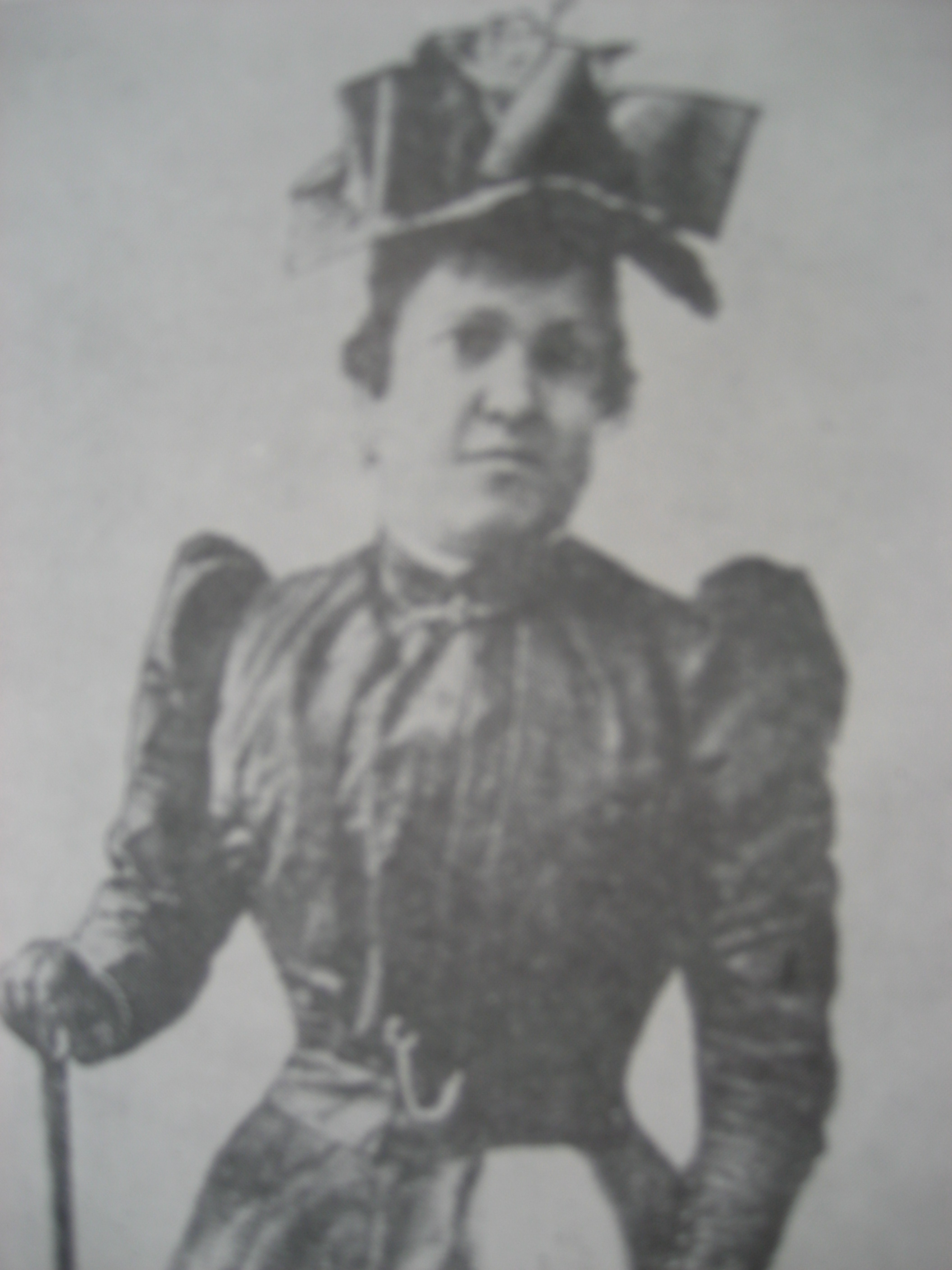
Eusapia Palladino, Warsaw, Poland, 1893

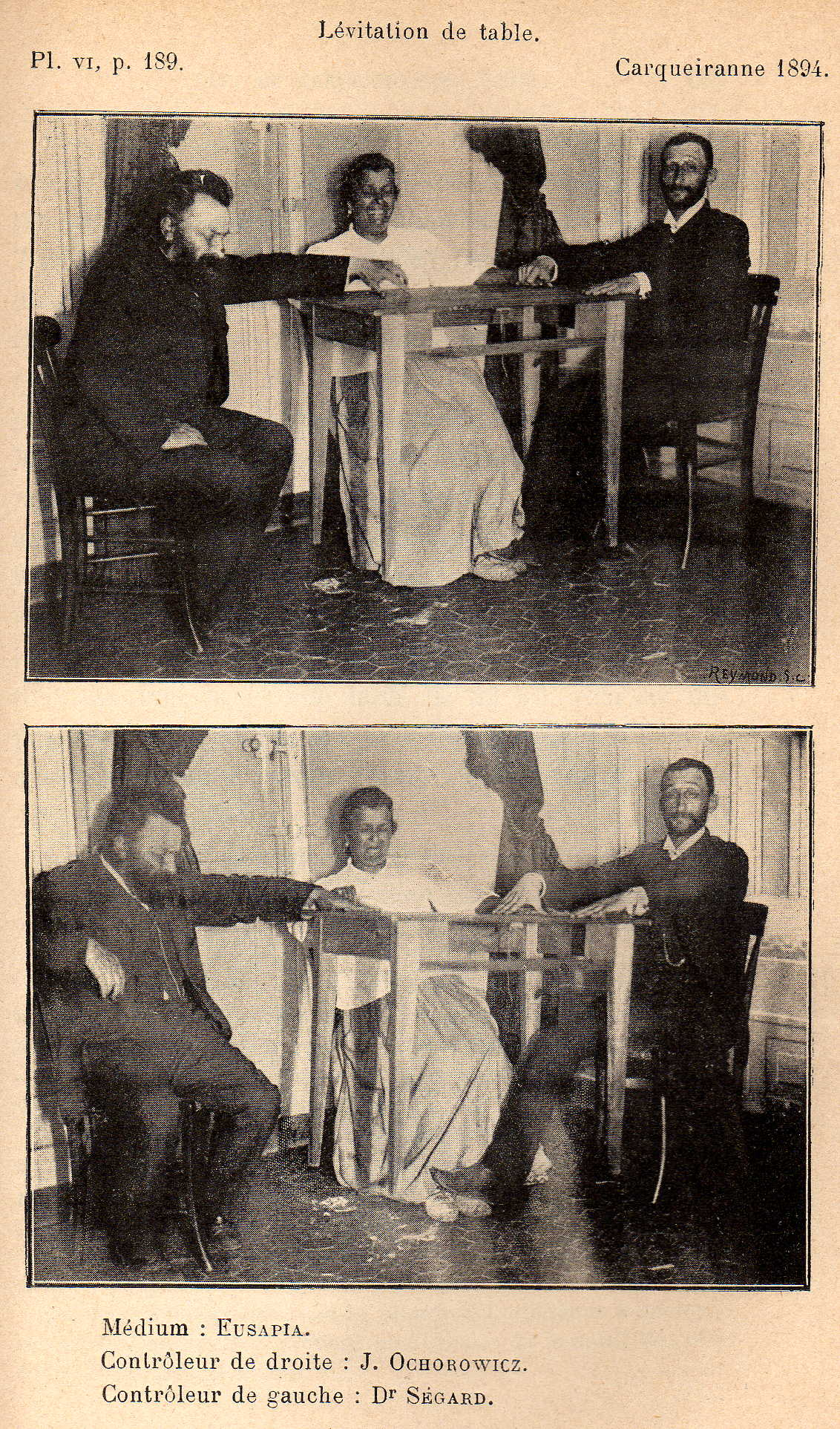
Palladino, 1894; Julian Ochorowicz (left) controls right hand; Dr. Ségard controls left hand and feet.

Eusapia Palladino (alternative spelling: Paladino; 21 January 1854 – 16 May 1918) was an Italian spiritualist physical medium. She claimed extraordinary powers such as the ability to levitate tables, communicate with the dead through her spirit guide John King, and to produce other supernatural phenomena.

She convinced many persons of her powers, but was caught in deceptive trickery throughout her career. Magicians, including Harry Houdini, and skeptics who evaluated her claims concluded that none of her phenomena were genuine and that she was a clever trickster.

Her Warsaw séances at the turn of 1893–94 inspired several colorful scenes in the historical novel Pharaoh, which Bolesław Prus began writing in 1894.

== Early life ==
Palladino was born into a peasant family in Minervino Murge, Italy. She received little, if any, formal education. Orphaned as a child, she was taken in as a nursemaid by a family in Naples. In her early life, she was married to a travelling conjuror and theatrical artist, Raphael Delgaiz, whose store she helped manage. Palladino later married a wine merchant, Francesco Niola.

== Poland ==
Palladino visited Warsaw, Poland, on two occasions. Her first and longer visit was when she came at the importunities of the psychologist, Dr. Julian Ochorowicz, who hosted her from November 1893 to January 1894.

Regarding the phenomena demonstrated at Palladino's séances, Ochorowicz concluded against the spirit hypothesis and for a hypothesis that the phenomena were caused by a "fluidic action" and were performed at the expense of the medium's own powers and those of the other participants in the séances.

Ochorowicz introduced Palladino to the journalist and novelist Bolesław Prus, who attended a number of her séances, wrote about them in the press, and incorporated several Spiritualist-inspired scenes into his historical novel Pharaoh.

On 1 January 1894 Palladino called on Prus at his apartment. As described by Ochorowicz,

In the evening she visited Prus, whom she always adored. Though their conversation was original, because the one did not know Polish and the other Italian, when il Prusso entered she went mad with joy and they somehow managed to communicate with one another. So she saw it as her obligation to pay him a New Year's visit.

Palladino subsequently visited Warsaw in the second half of May 1898, on her way from St. Petersburg to Vienna and Munich. At that time, Prus attended at least two of the three séances that she conducted (the two séances were held in the apartment of Ludwik Krzywicki).

== England ==
In July 1895, Palladino was invited to England to Frederic William Henry Myers's house in Cambridge for a series of investigations into her mediumship. According to reports by the investigators Myers and Oliver Lodge, all the phenomena observed in the Cambridge sittings were the result of trickery. Her fraud was so clever, according to Myers, that it "must have needed long practice to bring it to its present level of skill".

In the Cambridge sittings, the results proved disastrous for her mediumship. During the séances Palladino was caught cheating in order to free herself from the physical controls of the experiments. Palladino was found liberating her hands by placing the hand of the controller on her left on top of the hand of the controller on her right. Instead of maintaining any contact with her, the observers on either side were found to be holding each other's hands and this made it possible for her to perform tricks. Richard Hodgson had observed Palladino free a hand to move objects and use her feet to kick pieces of furniture in the room. Because of the discovery of fraud, the British SPR investigators such as Henry Sidgwick and Frank Podmore considered Palladino's mediumship to be permanently discredited, and because of her fraud she was banned from any further experiments with the SPR in Britain. The magician John Nevil Maskelyne, who was involved in the investigation, supported Hodgson's conclusion. However, despite the evidence of fraud, Oliver Lodge considered some of her phenomena genuine.

In the Daily Chronicle on 29 October 1895, Maskelyne published a long exposure of Palladino's fraudulent methods. According to historian Ruth Brandon "Maskelyne concluded that everything rested on the question whether Eusapia could get a hand or foot free occasionally. She wriggled so much that it was impossible to control her properly throughout. If she could get one hand, and sometimes a foot, free, everything could be explained".

In the British Medical Journal on 9 November 1895 an article was published titled Exit Eusapia!. The article questioned the scientific legitimacy of the SPR for investigating Palladino, a medium who had a reputation of being a fraud and impostor. Part of the article read "It would be comic if it were not deplorable to picture this sorry Egeria surrounded by men like Professor Sidgwick, Professor Lodge, Mr. F. H. Myers, Dr. Schiaparelli, and Professor Richet, solemnly receiving her pinches and kicks, her finger skiddings, her sleight of hand with various articles of furniture as phenomena calling for serious study". This caused Henry Sidgwick to respond in a published letter to the British Medical Journal of 16 November 1895. According to Sidgwick SPR members had exposed the fraud of Palladino at the Cambridge sittings. Sidgwick wrote "Throughout this period we have continually combated and exposed the frauds of professional mediums, and have never yet published in our Proceedings, any report in favour of the performances of any of them". The response from the "BMJ" questioned why the SPR wasted time investigating phenomena that were the "result of jugglery and imposture" and did not urgently concern the welfare of mankind.

In 1898, Myers was invited to a series of séances in Paris with Charles Richet. In contrast to the previous séances in which he had observed fraud, he now claimed to have observed convincing phenomena. Sidgwick reminded Myers of Palladino's trickery in the previous investigations as "overwhelming" but Myers did not change his position. This enraged Richard Hodgson, then editor of SPR publications, who banned Myers from publishing anything on his recent sittings with Palladino in the SPR journal. Hodgson was convinced Palladino was a fraud and supported Sidgwick in the "attempt to put that vulgar cheat Eusapia beyond the pale". It wasn't until the 1908 sittings in Naples that the SPR reopened the Palladino file.

The British psychical researcher Harry Price, who studied Palladino's mediumship, wrote "Her tricks were usually childish: long hairs attached to small objects in order to produce 'telekinetic movements'; the gradual substitution of one hand for two when being controlled by sitters; the production of 'phenomena' with a foot which had been surreptitiously removed from its shoe and so on".

== France ==
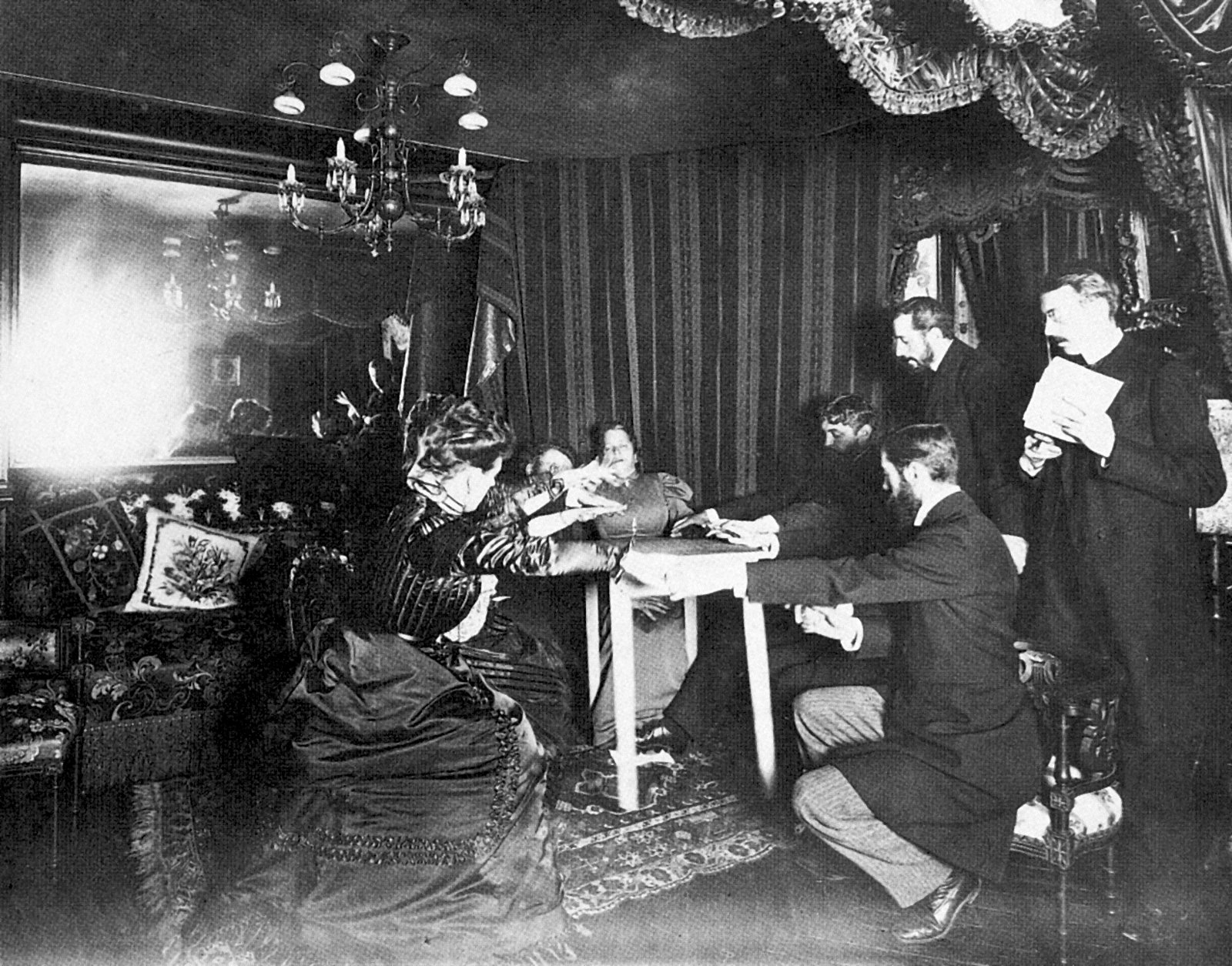
Table levitates during Palladino's séance at home of astronomer Camille Flammarion, France, 25 November 1898. There are two women seated at the table. Palladino sits at the far short end.

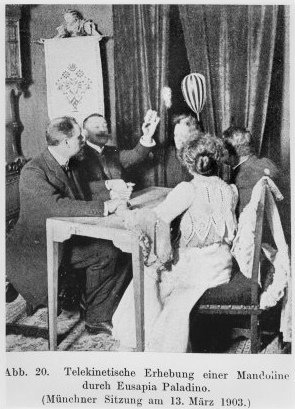
Mandolin (striped instrument, top, right) levitates above Palladino's head in front of the curtains at the far short end of the table during Palladino's séance in Munich, Germany, 13 March 1903.

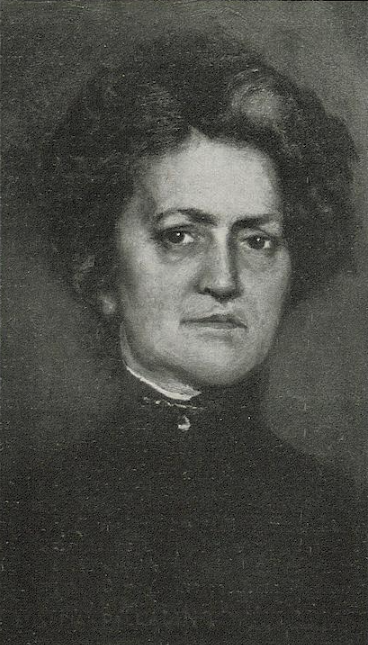
Portrait by Albert von Keller, c. 1904

The French psychical researcher Charles Richet with Oliver Lodge, Frederic William Henry Myers and Julian Ochorowicz investigated the medium Palladino in the summer of 1894 at his house in the Ile Roubaud in the Mediterranean. Richet claimed furniture moved during the séance and that some of the phenomena was the result of a supernatural agency. However, Richard Hodgson claimed there was inadequate control during the séances and the precautions described did not rule out trickery. Hodgson wrote all the phenomena "described could be account for on the assumption that Eusapia could get a hand or foot free". Lodge, Myers and Richet disagreed, but Hodgson was later proven correct in the Cambridge sittings as Palladino was observed to have used tricks exactly the way he had described them.

In 1898, the French astronomer Eugene Antoniadi investigated the mediumship of Palladino at the house of Camille Flammarion. According to Antoniadi her performance was "fraud from beginning to end". Palladino tried constantly to free her hands from control and was caught lowering a letter-scale by means of a hair.

Flammarion, who attended séances with Palladino, believed that some of her phenomena were genuine. He produced in his book alleged levitation photographs of a table and an impression of a face in putty. Joseph McCabe did not find the evidence convincing. He stated that the impressions of faces in putty were always of Palladino's face and could have easily been made, and she was not entirely clear from the table in the levitation photographs.

In 1905, Eusapia Palladino came to Paris, where Nobel-laureate physicists Pierre Curie and Marie Curie and Nobel-laureate physiologist Charles Richet investigated her amongst other philosophers and scientists such as Henri Bergson and Jacques-Arsène d'Arsonval. Signs of trickery were detected but they could not explain all of the phenomena.

Other members of the Curies' circle of scientist friends—including William Crookes; future Nobel laureate Jean Perrin and his wife Henriette Duportal; Louis Georges Gouy; and Paul Langevin—were also exploring spiritualism, as was Pierre Curie's brother Jacques, a fervent believer.

The Curies regarded mediumistic séances as "scientific experiments" and took detailed notes. According to historian Anna Hurwic, they thought it possible to discover in spiritualism the source of an unknown energy that would reveal the secret of radioactivity. On 24 July 1905, Pierre Curie reported to his friend Gouy: "We have had a series of séances with Eusapia Palladino at the [Society for Psychical Research]".

It was very interesting, and really the phenomena that we saw appeared inexplicable as trickery—tables raised from all four legs, movement of objects from a distance, hands that pinch or caress you, luminous apparitions. All in a [setting] prepared by us with a small number of spectators all known to us and without a possible accomplice. The only trick possible is that which could result from an extraordinary facility of the medium as a magician. But how do you explain the phenomena when one is holding her hands and feet and when the light is sufficient so that one can see everything that happens?

Pierre was eager to enlist Gouy. Palladino, he informed him, would return in November, and "I hope that we will be able to convince you of the reality of the phenomena or at least some of them." Pierre was planning to undertake experiments "in a methodical fashion". Marie Curie also attended Palladino's séances, but does not seem to have been as intrigued by them as Pierre.

On 14 April 1906, just five days before his accidental death, Pierre Curie wrote Gouy about his last séance with Palladino: "There is here, in my opinion, a whole domain of entirely new facts and physical states in space of which we have no conception".

Professors Gustave Le Bon and Albert Dastre of Paris University examined Palladino in 1906 and concluded that she was a cheat. They installed a secret lamp behind Palladino and, at a séance, saw her release and use her foot. In 1907, Palladino was found using a strand of her hair to move an object toward herself and it was noted by investigators that the objects were not outside of her easy reach.

== Italy ==
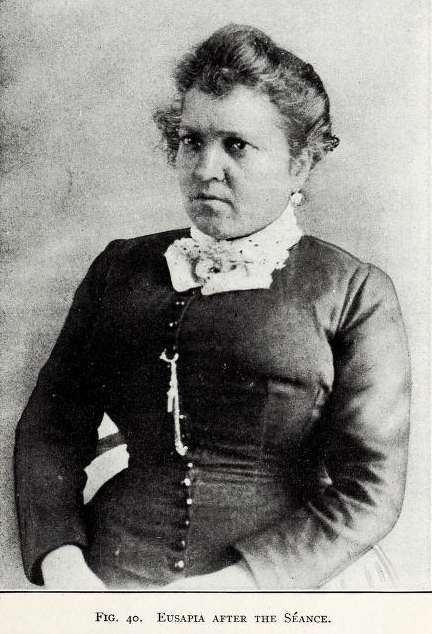
From 1909 book by Cesare Lombroso

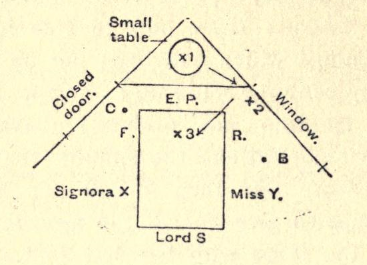
Sketch showing the layout of a séance in the 1908 Naples investigation.

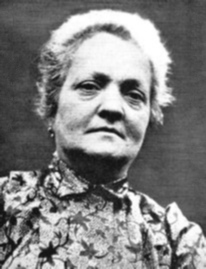
Palladino

In the late 19th century, the criminologist Cesare Lombroso attended séances with Palladino and was convinced that she had supernatural powers. Lombroso was persuaded by Palladino's manager, Ercole Chiaia, to attend her séances. Chiaia challenged him in an open letter in the magazine La Fanfulla, pointing out that if Lombroso was unbiased and free of prejudice, he should be willing to investigate her phenomena. Initially, Lombroso rejected the challenge, which was accepted by a young Spanish physician, Manuel Otero Acevedo, who travelled to Naples, studied Palladino and convinced Lombroso, Aksakof and other scientists of the importance of investigating her phenomena. Lombroso's subsequent conversion, reported by the press in Italy and the world, was instrumental to Palladino's reaching celebrity status at the turn of the century.

Most extraordinary was a phenomenon that Lombroso dubbed "The Levitation of the Medium to the Top of the Table". However, other investigators found the levitations of the table to be fraudulent. According to authors William Kalush and Larry Sloman, Lombroso was having a sexual relationship with Palladino. Lombroso's daughter Gina Ferrero wrote that, in his later years, Lombroso suffered from arteriosclerosis and his mental and physical health was wrecked. Joseph McCabe wrote that because of this it is not surprising that Palladino managed to fool him with her tricks.

Enrico Morselli was also interested in mediumship and psychical research. He studied Palladino and concluded that some of her phenomena were genuine – evidence for an unknown bio-psychic force present in all humans.

In 1908, the Society for Psychical Research (SPR) appointed a committee of three to examine Palladino in Naples. The committee comprised Mr. Hereward Carrington, investigator for the American Society for Psychical Research and an amateur conjurer; Mr. W. W. Baggally, also an investigator and amateur conjurer of much experience; and the Hon. Everard Feilding, who had had an extensive training as investigator and "a fairly complete education at the hands of fraudulent mediums". Three adjoining rooms on the fifth floor of the Hotel Victoria were rented. The middle room where Feilding slept was used in the evening for the séances. In the corner of the room was a séance cabinet created by a pair of black curtains to form an enclosed area that contained a small round table with several musical instruments. In front of the curtains was placed a wooden table. During the séances, Palladino would sit at this table with her back to the curtains. The investigators sat on either side of her, holding her hand and placing a foot on her foot. Guest visitors also attended some of the séances; the Feilding report mentions that Professor Filippo Bottazzi and Professor Galeotti were present at the fourth séance, and a Mr. Ryan was present at the eighth séance.

Although the investigators caught Palladino cheating, they were convinced Palladino produced genuine supernatural phenomena such as levitations of the table, movement of the curtains, movement of objects from behind the curtain and touches from hands. Regarding the first report by Carrington and Feilding, the American scientist and philosopher Charles Sanders Peirce wrote:

Eusapia Palladino has been proved to be a very clever prestigiateuse and cheat, and was visited by a Mr. Carrington.... In point of fact he has often caught the Palladino creature in acts of fraud. Some of her performances, however, he cannot explain; and thereupon he urges the theory that these are supernatural, or, as he prefers it "supernormal". Well, I know how it is that when a man has been long intensely exercised and over fatigued by an enigma, his common-sense will sometimes desert him; but it seems to me that the Palladino has simply been too clever for him.... I think it more plausible that there are tricks that can deceive Mr. Carrington.

Frank Podmore in his book The Newer Spiritualism (1910) wrote a comprehensive critique of the Feilding report. Podmore said that the report provided insufficient information for crucial moments and the investigators representation of the witness accounts contained contradictions and inconsistencies as to who was holding Palladino's feet and hands. Podmore found accounts among the investigators conflicted as to who they claimed to have observed the incident. Podmore wrote that the report "at almost every point leaves obvious loopholes for trickery". During the séances the long black curtains were often intermixed with Palladino's long black dress. Palladino told Professor Bottazzi the black curtains were "indispensable". Researchers have suspected Palladino used the curtain to conceal her feet.

The psychologist C. E. M. Hansel criticized the Feilding report based on the conditions of the séances being susceptible to trickery. Hansel said that they were performed in semi-dark conditions, held in the late night or early morning introducing the possibility of fatigue and the "investigators had a strong belief in the supernatural, hence they would be emotionally involved".

In 1910, Everard Feilding returned to Naples, without Hereward Carrington and W. W. Baggally. Instead, he was accompanied by his friend, William S. Marriott, a magician of some distinction who had exposed psychic fraud in Pearson's Magazine. His plan was to repeat the famous earlier 1908 Naples sittings with Palladino. Unlike the 1908 sittings which had baffled the investigators, this time Feilding and Marriott detected her cheating, just as she had done in the US. Her deceptions were obvious. Palladino evaded control and was caught moving objects with her foot, shaking the curtain with her hands, moving the cabinet table with her elbow and touching the séance sitters. Milbourne Christopher wrote regarding the exposure "when one knows how a feat can be done and what to look for, only the most skillful performer can maintain the illusion in the face of such informed scrutiny."

In 1992, Richard Wiseman analyzed the Feilding report of Palladino and argued that she employed a secret accomplice that could enter the room by a fake door panel positioned near the séance cabinet. Wiseman discovered this trick was already mentioned in a book from 1851, he also visited a carpenter and skilled magician who constructed a door within an hour with a false panel. The accomplice was suspected to be her second husband, who insisted on bringing Palladino to the hotel where the séances took place. Paul Kurtz suggested that Carrington could have been Palladino's secret accomplice. Kurtz found it suspicious that he was appointed as her manager after the séances in Naples. Carrington was also absent on the night of the last séance. However, Massimo Polidoro and Gian Marco Rinaldi who analyzed the Feilding report came to the conclusion that no secret accomplice was needed as Palladino during the 1908 Naples séances could have produced the phenomena by using her foot.

== America ==
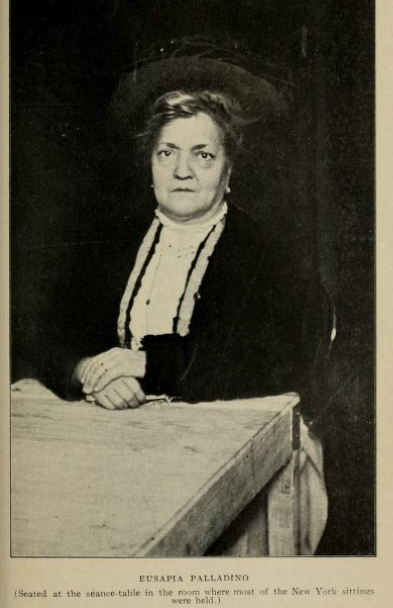
In New York

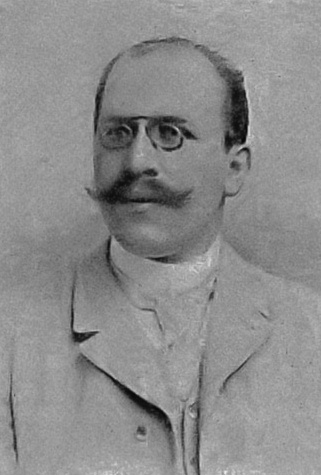
Hugo Münsterberg

Palladino visited America in 1909 with Hereward Carrington as her manager. Her arrival was publicized by the American press, with newspapers such as the New York Times and magazines such as the Cosmopolitan publishing numerous articles on the Italian medium.

The magician Howard Thurston attended a séance and endorsed Palladino's levitation of a table as genuine. However, at a séance on 18 December in New York, the Harvard psychologist Hugo Münsterberg with the help of a hidden man lying under a table, caught her levitating the table with her foot. He had also observed Palladino free her foot from her shoe and use her toes to move a guitar in the séance cabinet. Münsterberg also claimed that Palladino moved the curtains from a distance in the room by releasing a jet of air from a rubber bulb that she had in her hand. Daniel Cohen said that "[Palladino] was undaunted by Munsterberg's exposure. Her tricks had been exposed many times before, yet she had prospered". The exposure was not taken seriously by Palladino's defenders.

In January 1910 a series of séance sittings were held at the physics laboratory at Columbia University. Scientists such as Robert W. Wood and Edmund Beecher Wilson attended. The magicians W. S. Davis, J. L. Kellogg, J. W. Sargent and Joseph Rinn were present in the last séance sittings in April. They discovered that Palladino had freed her left foot to perform the phenomena. Rinn gave a full account of fraudulent behavior observed in a séance of Palladino. Milbourne Christopher summarized the exposure:

Joseph F. Rinn and Warner C. Pyne, clad in black coveralls, had crawled into the dining room of Columbia professor Herbert G. Lord's house while a Palladino seance was in progress. Positioning themselves under the table, they saw the medium's foot strike a table leg to produce raps. As the table tilted to the right, due to pressure of her right hand on the surface, they saw her put her left foot under the left table leg. Pressing down on the tabletop with her left hand and up with her left foot under the table leg to form a clamp, she lifted her foot and "levitated" the table from the floor.

Palladino was offered $1000 by Rinn if she could perform a feat in controlled conditions that could not be duplicated by magicians. Palladino eventually agreed to the contest but did not turn up for it, and instead returned to Italy.

== Tricks ==
In England, America, France and Germany, Palladino had been caught using tricks. Psychical researchers such as Hereward Carrington who believed some of her phenomena to be genuine, accepted that she would resort to trickery on occasion.

Historian Peter Lamont has written that although Palladino's defenders accepted that she would cheat, they "pointed to the best evidence (where, they argued, fraud had been impossible), [but] critics argued that the investigators had simply missed it". On the subject of fraud and Palladino, the philosopher and skeptic Paul Kurtz wrote:

[Palladino] was caught red-handed in blatant acts of fraud by members of the Society for Psychical Research in Cambridge and by scientific teams at Columbia and Harvard Universities. She was shown to be substituting her hand or foot and using them in darkened seances to move objects so that they appeared to be levitating. Even her defenders conceded that she cheated, at least some of the time. The problem that puzzles me is this; If one finds sleight-of-hand techniques being used some of the time by such individuals, then why should one accept anything else that is presented by them as genuine?... Skeptics question the first Feilding report because in a subsequent test by Feilding and other tests by scientists, Palladino had been caught cheating.

In 1910, Stanley LeFevre Krebs wrote an entire book debunking Palladino and exposing the tricks she had used throughout her career, Trick Methods of Eusapia Paladino. The psychologist Joseph Jastrow's book The Psychology of Conviction (1918), included a chapter ("The Case of Paladino (sic)") exposing Palladino's tricks.

Magicians such as Harry Houdini and Joseph Rinn have claimed all her feats were conjuring tricks. According to Houdini "Palladino cheated at Cambridge, she cheated in l'Aguélas, and she cheated in New York and yet each time that she was caught cheating the Spiritualists upheld her, excused her, and forgave her. Truly their logic sometimes borders on the humorous".

John Mulholland stated that "Palladino was caught cheating times without number even by those who believed in her, and she made no bones about admitting it". Researchers have suspected that Palladino's first husband, a travelling conjuror, taught her séance tricks. The magician Milbourne Christopher demonstrated Palladino's fraudulent techniques in his stage performances and on Johnny Carson's "Tonight Show".

Palladino dictated the lighting and "controls" that were to be used in her mediumistic séances. The fingertips of her right hand rested upon the back of the hand of one "controller". Her left hand was grasped at the wrist by a second controller seated on her other side. Her feet rested on top of the feet of her controllers, sometimes beneath them. A controller's foot was in contact with only the toe of her shoe. Occasionally her ankles were tied to the legs of her chair, but they were given a play of four inches. During the sitting in semi-darkness, her ankles would become free. Generally she was unbound. In one instance, a controller cut her free so that phenomena might occur.

Theodor Lipps who attended a séance sitting in 1898 in Munich noticed that, instead of Palladino's hand, he held the hand of the sitter controlling the left side of the medium. In this way Palladino had freed both hands. She was also discovered using trickery by others in Germany. Max Dessoir and Albert Moll of Berlin detected the precise substitution tricks that were used by Palladino. Dessoir and Moll wrote: "The main point is cleverly to distract attention and to release one or both hands or one or both feet. This is Paladino's chief trick".

Palladino normally refused to allow someone beneath the table to hold her feet with his hands. She refused to levitate the table from a standing position. The table being rectangular, she had to sit only at a short side. No wall of any kind could stand between Palladino and the table. The weight of the table was seventeen pounds. The table levitated to a height of 3 to 10 inches for a maximum of 2–3 seconds. She was an expert at freeing a hand or foot to produce phenomena. She chose to sit at the short side of the table so that her controllers on each side had to sit closer together, making it easier to deceive them.

Her levitation of a table began by freeing one foot, rocking the table, and then slipping her toe under one leg. Since she sat at the narrow end of the table, this was made possible. She lifted the table by rocking back on the heel of this foot. She made the "spirit" raps by striking a leg of the table with a free foot.

A photograph, taken in the dark, of a small stool that was alleged to have levitated was revealed to be sitting on Palladino's head. After she saw this photo, the stool remained immobile on the floor. A plaster impression taken of a spirit hand matched Palladino's hand. She was caught using a hair to move a scale. In the dim light, her fist, wrapped in a handkerchief, became a materialized spirit.

Science historian Sherrie Lynne Lyons wrote that the glowing or light-emitting hands in séances could easily be explained by the rubbing of oil of phosphorus on the hands. In 1909 an article was published in The New York Times titled "Paladino Used Phosphorus". Hereward Carrington confessed to having painted Palladino's arm with phosphorescent paint, though he claimed to have used the paint to detect fraud by tracking the movement of her arm. There was publicity over the incident and Carrington claimed his comments had been misquoted by newspapers.

The conjuror W. S. Davis published an article (with diagrams) exposing the tricks of Palladino. Davis also speculated that she used a piece of wire that she hid in her dress to tilt the séance table. Davis noted that when an attempt had been made to place a screen between her and the table she protested. Davis wrote she could not lift the table unless her dress was in contact with it and there is no obstruction between herself and the table. Physician Leonard Keene Hirshberg who attended a séance, observed Palladino to have "hook[ed] her skirt and foot into a tiny reed table behind her" he also said that he heard a noise that sounded like "a piece of wire, pin, or toe-nail groping its way under the table."

The psychologist Millais Culpin wrote that Palladino was a conscious cheat but also had symptoms of hysterical dissociation so may have deceived herself. Laura Finch, editor of the Annals of Psychical Science, wrote in 1909 that Palladino had "erotic tendencies" and some of her male séance sitters were deluded or "glamoured" by her presence. According to Deborah Blum, Palladino had a habit of "climbing into the laps of the male" investigators.

M. Lamar Keene said that "observers said that Eusapia Palladino used to experience obvious orgasmic reactions during her séances and had a marked propensity for handsome male sitters". In 1910, Palladino admitted to an American reporter that she cheated in her séances, claiming her sitters had 'willed' her to do so. Eric Dingwall who investigated the mediumship of Palladino came to the conclusion that she was "vital, vulgar, amorous and a cheat".

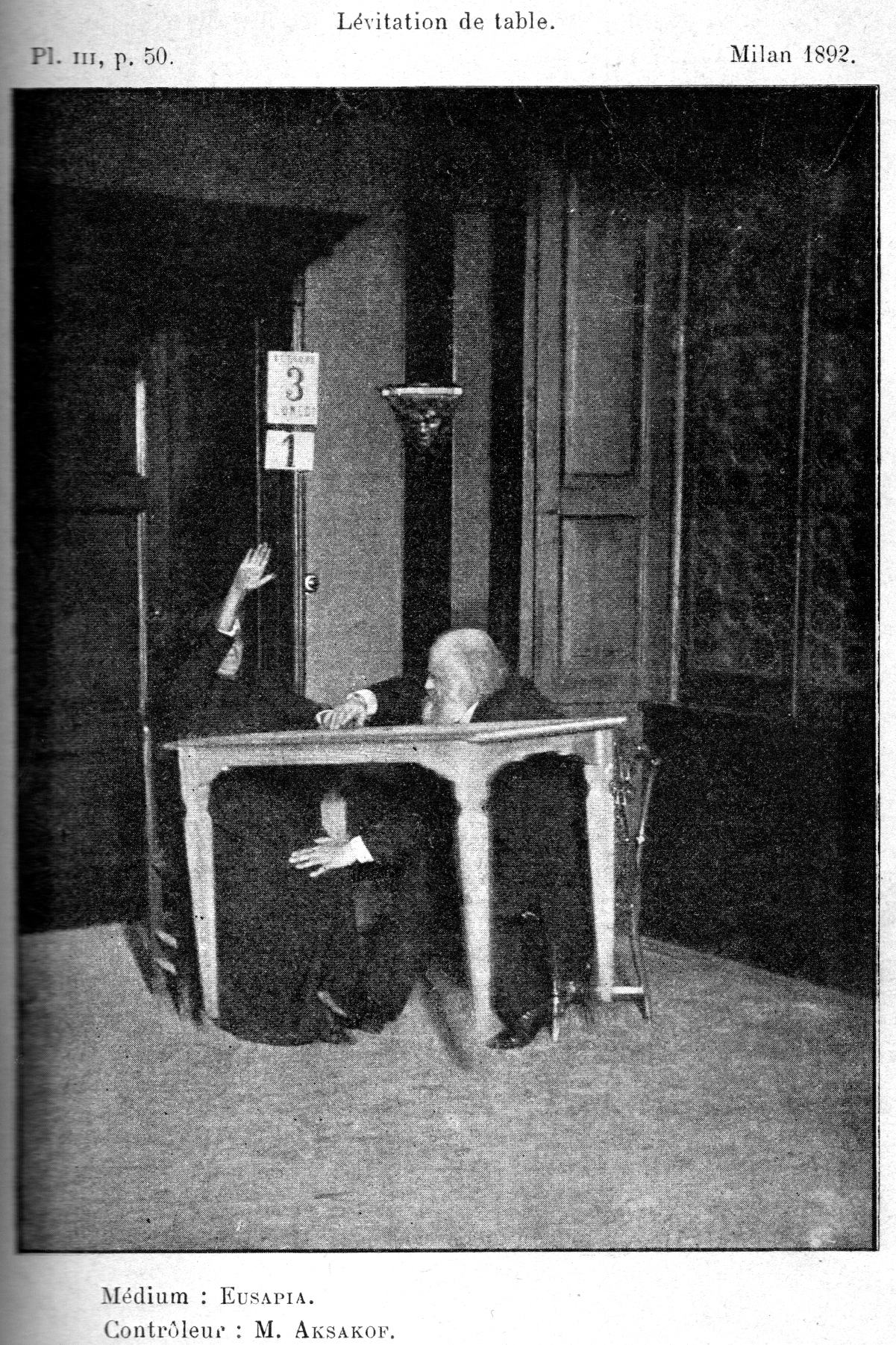
Alexandr Aksakov (right) "controls" while Palladino levitates table, Milan, 1892.

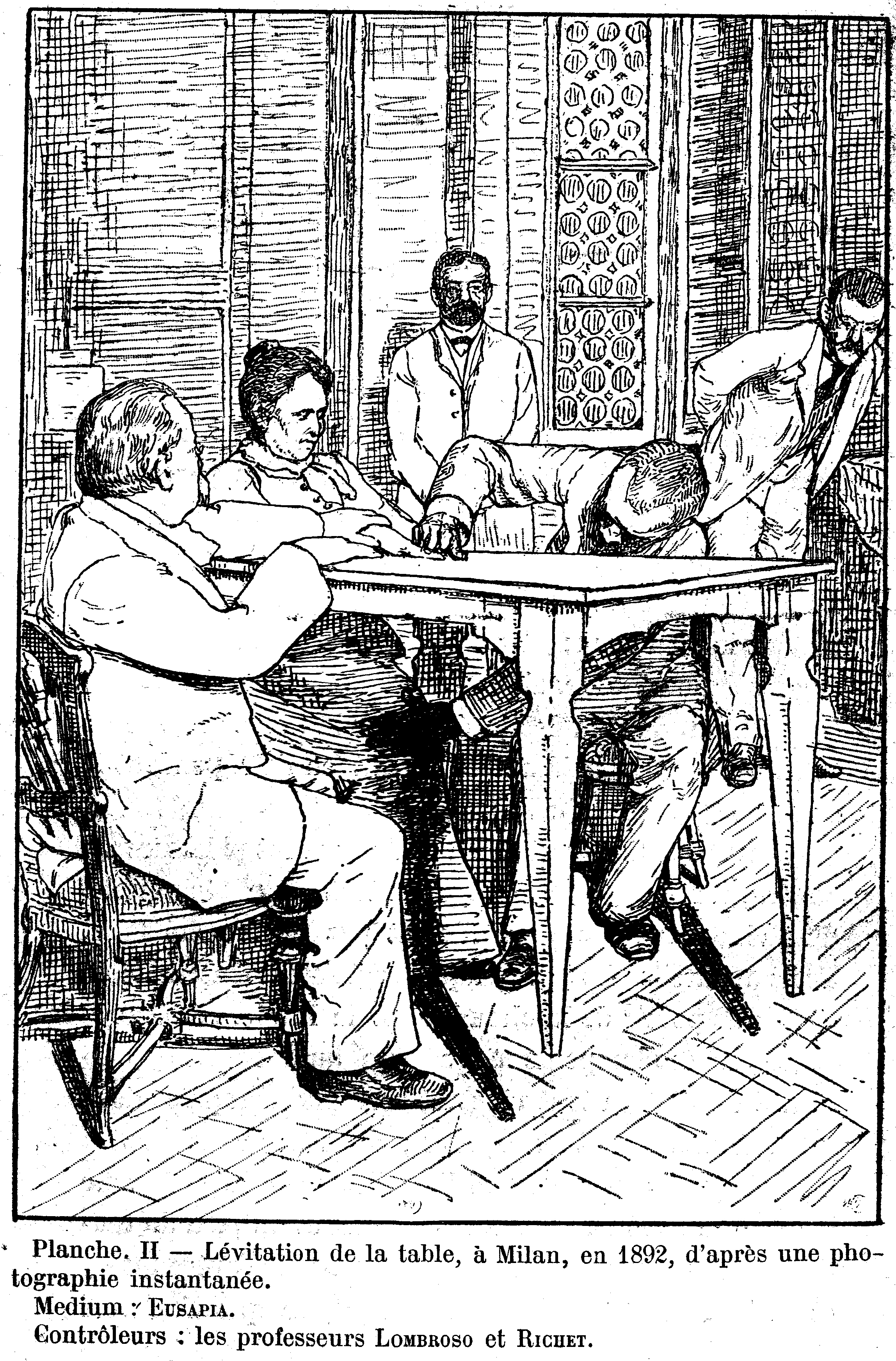
Cesare Lombroso and Charles Richet "control" while Palladino levitates table, Milan, 1892.

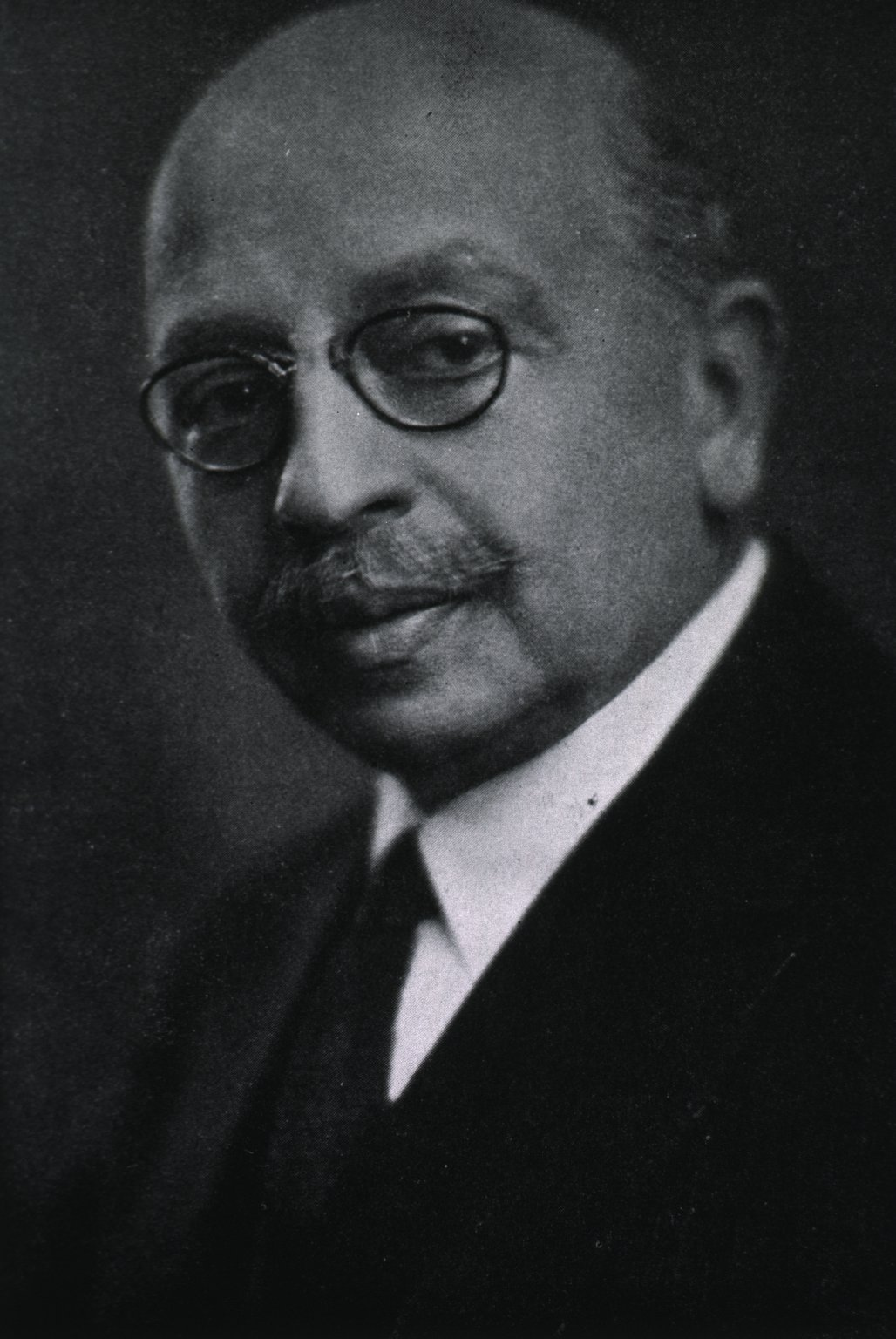
Joseph Jastrow

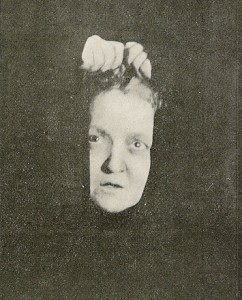
Palladino with fake ectoplasm hands.

== See also ==
- Mina Crandon
- Albert de Rochas, leading French psychic researcher and one of the committee members who investigated Palladino.
