= Stanisława Tomczyk =

Polish spiritual medium

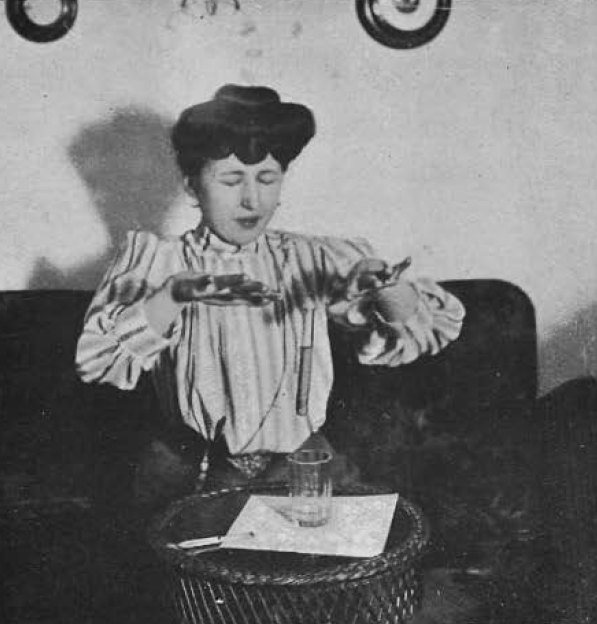
- Born: C 1885
- Died: 2 April 1975
- Occupation: Spiritual medium

Stanisława Janina Tomczyk (c 1885 – 2 April 1975) was a Polish spiritual medium in the early 20th century known for her alleged demonstrations of psychokinesis and psychic photography. Magicians and skeptics have dismissed Tomczyk as a fraud who performed her feats with the aid of a hidden thread.

== Career ==
At the age of twenty, Tomczyk was arrested during a riot and jailed for ten days. The experience is said to have caused her hysteria and mental dissociation.

=== Ochorowicz experiments ===
Tomczyk was the subject of experiments conducted in 1908–9 at Wisła, in southern Poland, by the Polish psychologist Julian Ochorowicz. Reportedly he regularly hypnotized her for therapeutic purposes, and she claimed to be controlled by an entity, "Little Stasia" ("Stasia" being a diminutive of Tomczyk's given name, "Stanisława"), who said she was not the spirit of any dead person but was described as a naked girl, one foot high. Ochorowicz was convinced from the experiments that "Little Stasia" was a second personality of Tomczyk. He conducted psychokinesis experiments with Tomczyk in which she was alleged to have levitated objects without contact, stop the movement of a clock in a glass case, and influence the turn of a roulette wheel. She was also said to have produced psychic photographs. Ochorowicz reported the results of the experiments in Annales des Sciences Psychiques (January 1909–August 1912).

On one occasion Ochorowicz saw a black thread between her hands, and in numerous photographs taken by him and later investigators a thread was sometimes visible. Ochorowicz believed that the thread was a paranormal extrusion from her fingers, which he termed "ideoplasm". Ochorowicz also conducted psychic photography experiments with Tomczyk with his camera. He reported that she produced a psychic self-portrait of "Little Stasia", a photograph of an astrally projected hand and a photograph showing a "current" of light between her thumbs. He first reported observing the astrally projected hand which he called a "fluidic hand" at a séance on April 4, 1911. For some of the experiments he placed her hands directly on the photographic plates or held them at varying distances. He believed from the photographs that he had discovered a new undocumented source of energy in the form of “a light which we have given the name ‘mediumnic’ although we have no knowledge of it and cannot place it in any category of known light sources".

For these photographs he won a prize of 1000 francs from the Comité d'Etude de Photographie Transcendental in 1911 and a similar prize was awarded by the Académie des Sciences de Paris. However, years later both parties dismissed the photographs as fraudulent. The scientific community dismissed Ochorowicz's experiments as pseudoscientific based on poor experimental design and gullibility.

In 1933, Everard Feilding wrote in a letter to W. B. Yeats stating that Tomczyk "practically remembers nothing of the phenomena reported by Ochorowicz, whom anyhow she absolutely mistrusts as an observer."

=== Flournoy experiments ===
Theodore Flournoy who observed Tomczyk in Paris in five séances in Spring 1909 was convinced she moved objects by psychokinesis. In May 1909, Flournoy and his son Henri, Ochorowicz and Professors Édouard Claparède, Cellerier and Batelli held a series of séance experiments with Tomczyk in Geneva. The experiments were complete failures and Flournoy recalled how Tomczyk tried to perform certain complicated experiments "which were manifestly purely fraudulent". Professor Batelli believed that the movement of objects was fraudulently produced by a hidden hair or thread that was held between her hands.

=== London experiments ===
In London, between 2 June and 13 July 1914, Tomczyk was tested in eleven sittings by the Society for Psychical Research. The investigation committee included electrical engineer Mark Barr, V. J. Woolley, W. W. Baggally and Everard Feilding. The informal experiments admittedly not subject to rigid control obtained "inconclusive results". The most striking demonstration was the momentary levitation of a celluloid ball some 9 inches above a table, with her hands about a quarter-inch away.

== Fraud ==
Magicians and skeptics suspected that the psychokinesis of objects Tomczyk was performing involved the use of a fine thread or hair, running between her hands to lift and suspend the objects in the air. This was confirmed when psychical researchers who tested Tomczyk occasionally observed the thread.

Tomczyk's levitation of a glass beaker was exposed and replicated in 1910 by the magician William S. Marriott by means of a hidden thread.

== Personal life ==
Her father was Eustachiusz Tomczyk. Tomczyk was a Catholic and lived at Hyde Park Mansions. In 1919, she married the psychical researcher Everard Feilding, secretary of the Society for Psychical Research.

== Gallery ==
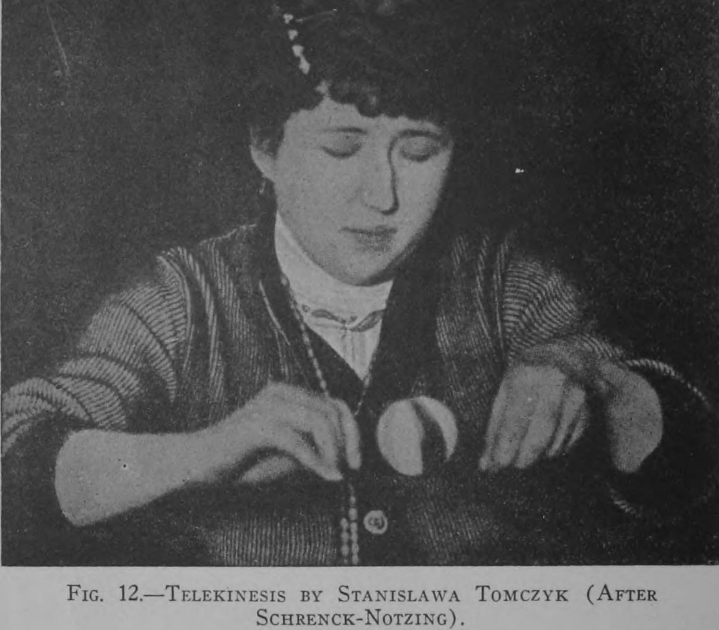
Tomczyk allegedly levitating a ball

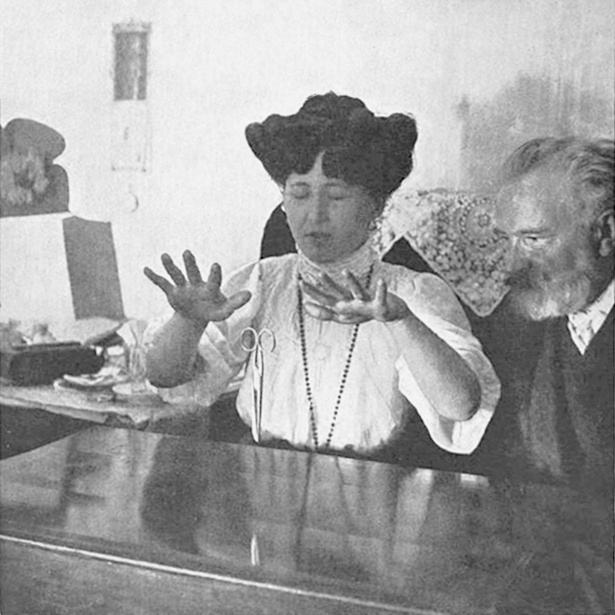
Tomczyk, in trance, allegedly levitates scissors as psychologist Julian Ochorowicz watches

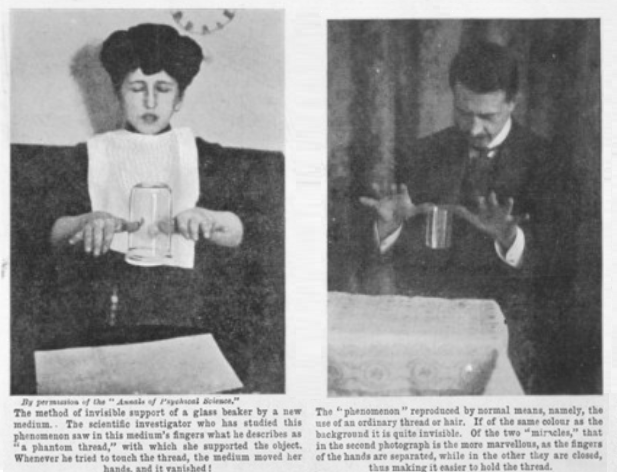
Tomczyk (left) and magician William Marriott (right), who duplicated by natural means Tomczyk's trick of levitating a glass beaker

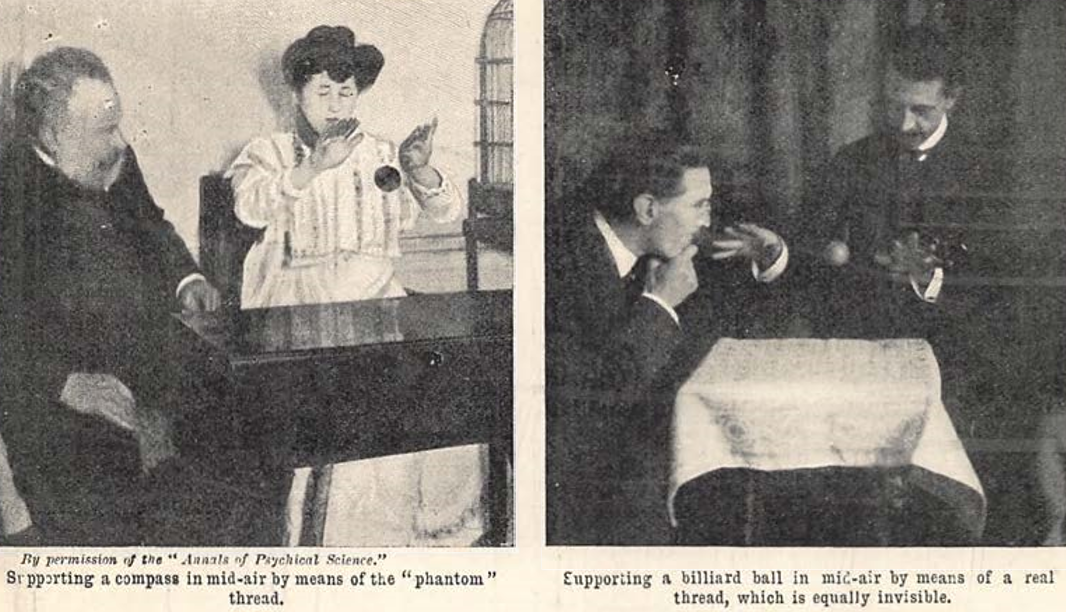
Tomczyk (left) and magician William Marriott (right)

== See also ==
- Nina Kulagina
- Notable claimants of psychokinetic ability
