= Hereward Carrington =

American psychic investigator and writer

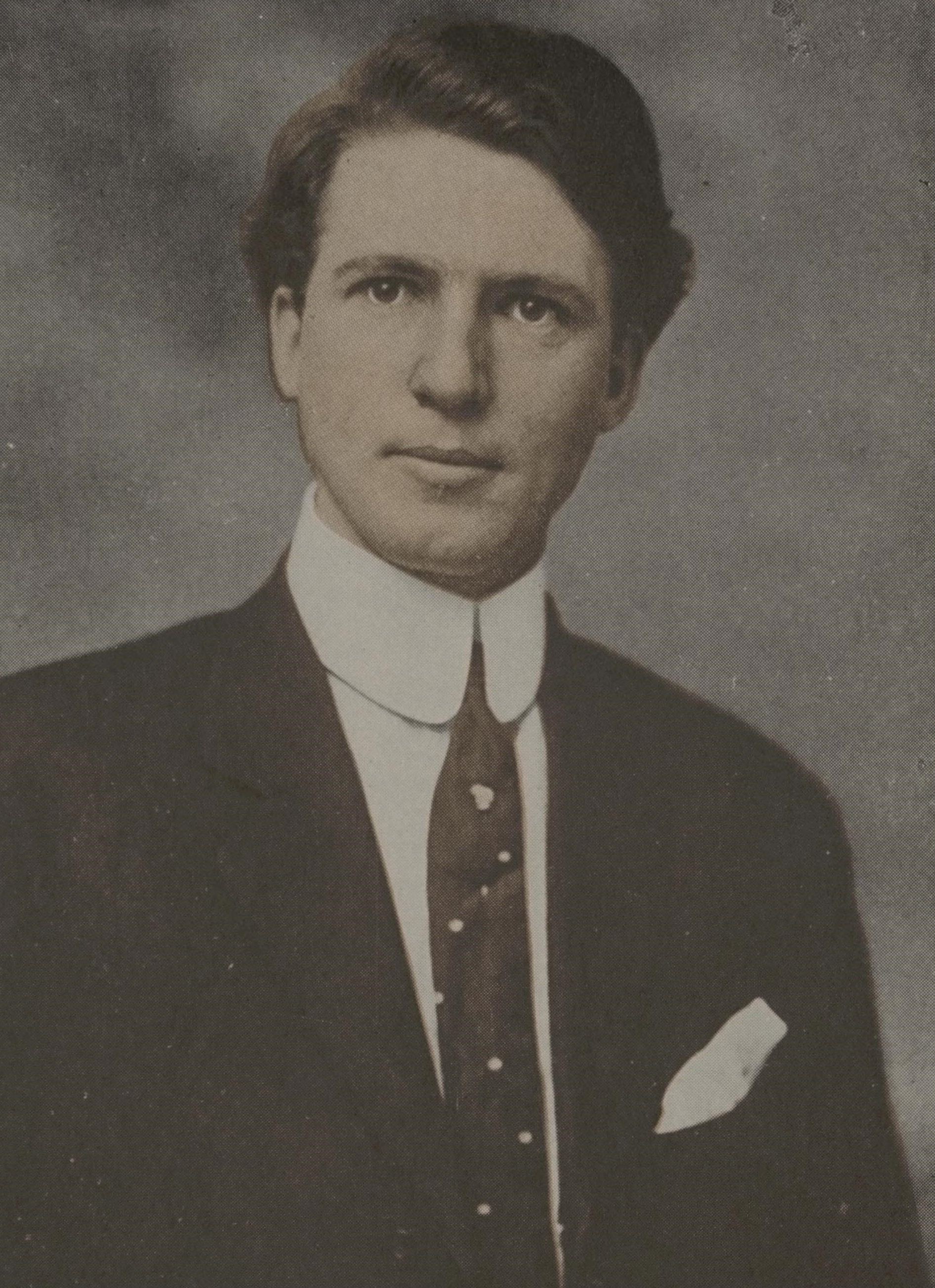
- Born: Hereward Hubert Lavington Carrington; 17 October 1880; St. Helier, Jersey
- Died: 26 December 1958 (aged 78); Los Angeles, California
- Occupations: Paranormal researcher Psychic investigator
- Organization: Society for Psychical Research

Hereward Carrington (17 October 1880 – 26 December 1958) was an American investigator of psychic phenomena and author. His subjects included several of the most high-profile cases of apparent psychic ability of his times, and he wrote over 100 books on subjects including the paranormal and psychical research, conjuring and stage magic, and alternative medicine. Carrington promoted fruitarianism and held pseudoscientific views about dieting.

== Early life ==
Carrington was born in St Helier, Jersey in 1880. He emigrated to the United States in 1888 (although it is a common misconception he emigrated in 1899). Hereward lived with his brother Hedley in Minnesota and appears in the 1900 census there. He settled in New York City in 1904. There he first worked as an assistant editor for Street and Smith magazines. Initially a sceptic about psychic abilities, his interest grew from reading books on the subject and at the age of 19 he joined the Society for Psychical Research (SPR).

== Career ==
Carrington became a member of the American Society for Psychical Research in 1907 and worked as an assistant to James Hyslop until 1908, during which time he established his reputation as an ASPR investigator. However his connection with the ASPR ceased due to lack of funds.

An important early case Carrington investigated and described was that of the medium Eusapia Palladino in 1908. Carrington and two companions went to Naples to see her on behalf of the English SPR, an experience which strengthened his belief in the reality of psychic phenomena. He described her in his 1909 book Eusapia Palladino and Her Phenomena, invited her to the US and helped arrange a tour for her. He detected her cheating at sittings, but also claimed she had genuine supernatural ability. He also made a detailed enquiry into the case of Esther Cox (the Great Amherst Mystery) in 1910. The events surrounding Cox had occurred more than thirty years previously, but Carrington contacted surviving witnesses for statements and published a detailed account of the Amherst phenomena.

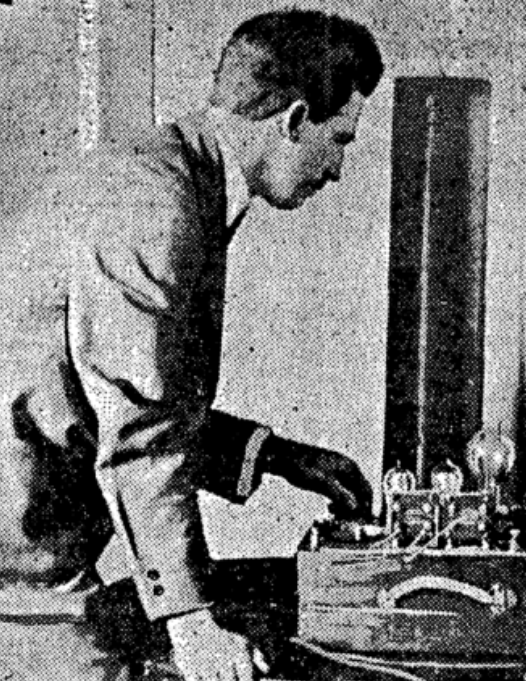
Carrington with his "ululometer" ghost detector, or "psychic howler", in 1922

Carrington was an amateur conjuror and was critical towards some paranormal phenomena. Carrington in his book The Physical Phenomena of Spiritualism (1907) exposed the tricks of fraudulent mediums such as those used in slate-writing, table-turning, trumpet mediumship, materializations, sealed-letter reading and spirit photography. The book revealed the tricks of mediums such as Henry Slade and William Eglinton. He wrote in the book that after his investigations and studies into the subject of mediumship that 98% of both the physical and mental phenomena were fraudulent. He did however believe that some mediumship phenomena was genuine.

Science historian Sherrie Lynne Lyons wrote that the glowing or light-emitting hands in séances could easily be explained by the rubbing of oil of phosphorus on the hands. In 1909 an article was published in The New York Times titled Paladino Used Phoshorus. Carrington confessed to having painted Palladino's arm with phosphorescent paint, however he claimed to have used the paint to track the movement of her arm, to detect fraud. There was publicity over the incident and Carrington claimed his comments had been misquoted by newspapers.

Carrington exposed the sleight of hand tricks the Eddy Brothers used in an article in the Popular Science magazine. He wrote an introduction to the book Spiritism and Psychology (1911) by Théodore Flournoy which took a psychological approach to cases of mediumship. Carrington gained his PhD in 1918 from Oskaloosa College.

In 1930, he stated "I have no particular theory to defend, and no belief to uphold. I am not a convinced spiritualist; at the same time, I am willing to grant that the evidence for survival is remarkably strong." Among other researches he made a detailed study of the medium Eileen J. Garrett. Carrington's 1957 book The Case for Psychic Survival is devoted to Garrett.

Carrington kept extensive records of his research and investigations, and corresponded with notable figures of the day including Israel Regardie, Nandor Fodor, Aleister Crowley and one of the earliest pioneers in the field of astral projection, Sylvan Muldoon, with whom he co-authored three books, including The Projection of the Astral Body (1929) and The Phenomena of Astral Projection (1951). A large collection of his writings and correspondence is held by Heidieh Croce, the heir to Marie Carrington's estate, as well as the Princeton University library.

He can be heard as a contestant on 7 October 1953 radio edition of You Bet Your Life. He died in 1958.

== American Psychical Institute ==
In 1921, Carrington founded the American Psychical Institute. It consisted of a laboratory that was one of the first to investigate psychical phenomena preceding the National Laboratory of Psychical Research. It operated for only two years, but he later reconstituted it in 1933 in New York City with the assistance of his wife Marie Carrington. Henry Gilroy was executive director for the institute for five years.

In 1933, Canadian political leader William Lyon Mackenzie King joined the institute under the name "M. K. Venice".

In 1935, Carrington and Nandor Fodor released a bulletin through the institute titled Historic Poltergeists. It became the basis of their book Haunted People published in 1951.

== Notable investigations ==
=== Eusapia Palladino ===
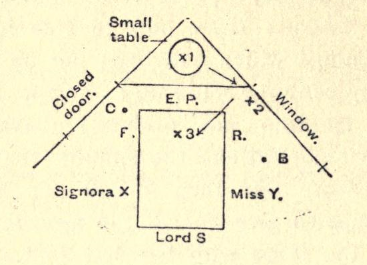
Sketch showing the layout of a séance in the 1908 Naples investigation.

In 1908, the Society for Psychical Research (SPR) appointed a committee of three to examine Palladino in Naples. The committee comprised Mr. Hereward Carrington, investigator for the American Society for Psychical Research and an amateur conjuror; Mr. W. W. Baggally, also an investigator and amateur conjuror of much experience; and the Hon. Everard Feilding, who had had an extensive training as investigator and "a fairly complete education at the hands of fraudulent mediums." Three adjoining rooms on the fifth floor of the Hotel Victoria were rented. The middle room where Feilding slept was used in the evening for the séances. In the corner of the room was a séance cabinet created by a pair of black curtains to form an enclosed area that contained a small round table with several musical instruments. In front of the curtains was placed a wooden table. During the séances, Palladino would sit at this table with her back to the curtains. The investigators sat on either side of her, holding her hand and placing a foot on her foot. Guest visitors also attended some of the séances; the Feilding report mentions that Professor Bottazzi and Professor Galeotti were present at the fourth séance, and a Mr. Ryan was present at the eighth séance.

Although the investigators caught Palladino cheating, they were convinced Palladino produced genuine supernatural phenomena such as levitations of the table, movement of the curtains, movement of objects from behind the curtain and touches from hands. Regarding the first report by Carrington and Feilding, the American scientist and philosopher Charles Sanders Peirce wrote:

Eusapia Palladino has been proved to be a very clever prestigiateuse and cheat, and was visited by a Mr. Carrington... In point of fact he has often caught the Palladino creature in acts of fraud. Some of her performances, however, he cannot explain; and thereupon he urges the theory that these are supernatural, or, as he prefers it "supernormal." Well, I know how it is that when a man has been long intensely exercised and over fatigued by an enigma, his common-sense will sometimes desert him; but it seems to me that the Palladino has simply been too clever for him... I think it more plausible that there are tricks that can deceive Mr. Carrington.

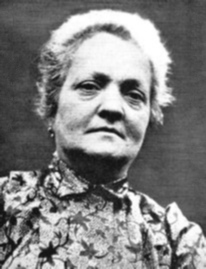
Palladino, c. 1900

Frank Podmore in his book The Newer Spiritualism (1910) wrote a comprehensive critique of the Feilding report. Podmore said that the report provided insufficient information for crucial moments and the investigators representation of the witness accounts contained contradictions and inconsistencies as to who was holding Palladino's feet and hands. Podmore found accounts among the investigators conflicted as to who they claimed to have observed the incident. Podmore wrote that the report "at almost every point leaves obvious loopholes for trickery." During the séances the long black curtains were often intermixed with Palladino's long black dress. Palladino told Professor Bottazzi the black curtains were "indispensable." Researchers have suspected Palladino used the curtain to conceal her feet.

The psychologist C. E. M. Hansel criticized the Feilding report based on the conditions of the séances being susceptible to trickery. Hansel noted that they were performed in semi-dark conditions, held in the late night or early morning introducing the possibility of fatigue and the "investigators had a strong belief in the supernatural, hence they would be emotionally involved."

In 1910, Everard Feilding returned to Naples, without Hereward Carrington and W. W. Baggally. Instead, he was accompanied by his friend, William S. Marriott, a magician of some distinction who had exposed psychic fraud in Pearson's Magazine. His plan was to repeat the famous earlier 1908 Naple sittings with Palladino. Unlike the 1908 sittings which had baffled the investigators, this time Feilding and Marriott detected her cheating, just as she had done in the US. Her deceptions were obvious. Palladino evaded control and was caught moving objects with her foot, shaking the curtain with her hands, moving the cabinet table with her elbow and touching the séance sitters. Milbourne Christopher wrote regarding the exposure "when one knows how a feat can be done and what to look for, only the most skillful performer can maintain the illusion in the face of such informed scrutiny."

In 1992, Richard Wiseman analyzed the Feilding report of Palladino and argued that she employed a secret accomplice that could enter the room by a fake door panel positioned near the séance cabinet. Wiseman discovered this trick was already mentioned in a book from 1851, he also visited a carpenter and skilled magician who constructed a door within an hour with a false panel. The accomplice was suspected to be her second husband, who insisted on bringing Palladino to the hotel where the séances took place. Paul Kurtz suggested that Carrington could have been Palladino's secret accomplice. Kurtz found it suspicious that he was raised as her manager after the séances in Naples. Carrington was also absent on the night of the last séance. However, Massimo Polidoro and Gian Marco Rinaldi who analyzed the Feilding report came to the conclusion that no secret accomplice was needed as Palladino during the 1908 Naples séances could have produced the phenomena by using her foot.

=== Mina Crandon ===
Among Carrington's best known subjects was Mina "Margery" Crandon whom he observed in 1924 on behalf of the Scientific American as part of an enquiry into Spiritualism, sitting on a committee alongside Harry Houdini, J. Malcolm Bird, William McDougall, Walter Franklin Prince and Daniel Frost Comstock. The committee had differing opinions on Crandon, and eventually only Carrington inclined to the belief that her powers were genuine, although subsequent evidence of possible fraud again led him to express doubts about her writing that he maintained a "perfectly open mind" about such phenomena pending the arrival of better evidence one way or the other.

Henry Gilroy, an associate and friend of Carrington later told biographer Paul Tabori "Of course, most people don't know this – but he (Carrington) had a love affair with Margery – on the q.t. They had an understanding that it would not affect in any way the report of the Scientific American magazine as to whether her mediumship was genuine or not. Their little love affair went on for several months and he told me how difficult it was to have their little trysts and get-togethers." It was also suggested that Carrington borrowed a large amount of money from Crandon that he was unable to repay. Magic historians William Kalush and Larry Sloman have noted that such factors could have biased his judgement regarding her mediumship.

== Dieting ==
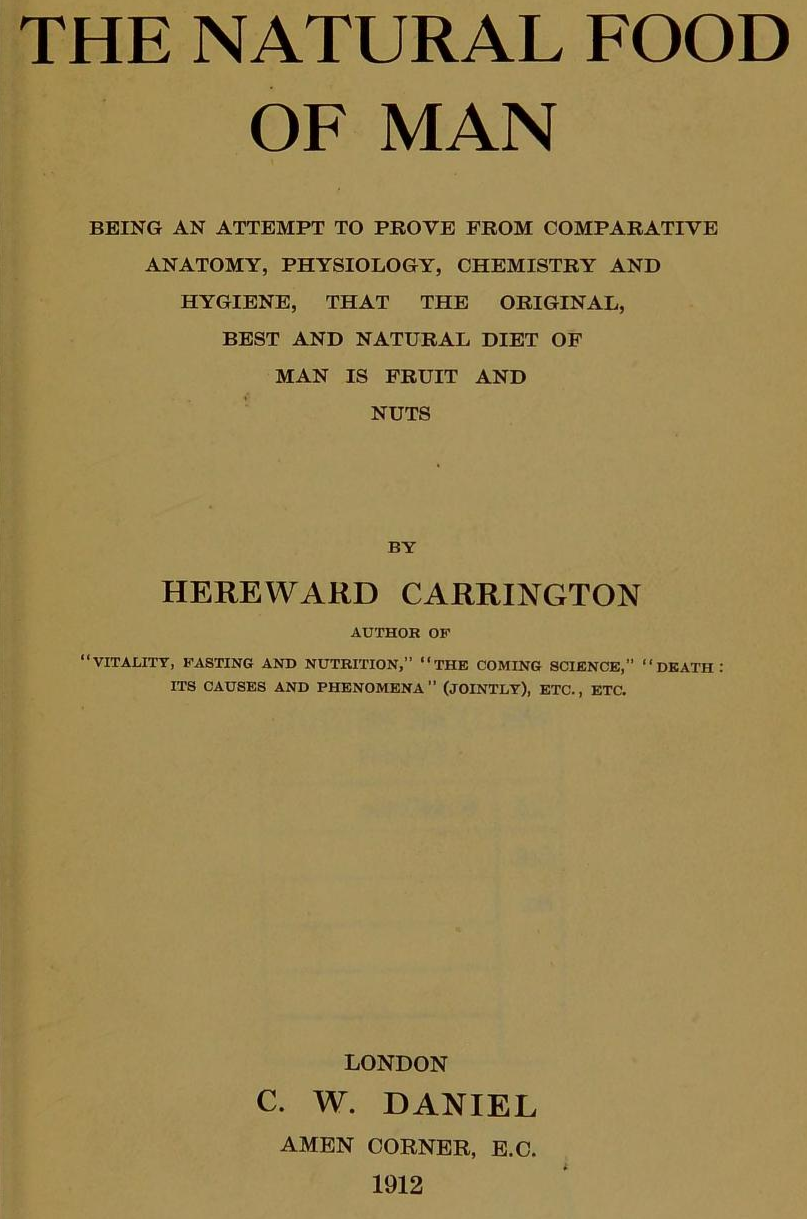
The Natural Food of Man, published in 1912

Carrington embraced different food fads. He experimented with fasting, fruitarianism and raw food diets. He was also a follower of the no breakfast plan. He consumed two meals a day, consisting of apples, figs, fruit salad, nuts and honey. However, Carrington suggested that honey and olive oil were admissible but unnecessary. He stated that man could live on fruits and nuts alone. Carrington's book The Natural Food of Man has been described as "one of the first apologies for fruitarianism." He argued against the consumption of cereals, dairy products, meat and salt. Although Carrington recommended that these foods should be gradually eliminated.

His Vitality, Fasting and Nutrition is over six hundred pages and is dedicated to the memory of Edward H. Dewey and Sylvester Graham. The book was negatively reviewed in the British Medical Journal, which commented that Carrington's "facts are taken at second hand, and that his arguments are derived from quotations from a vast number of writers, of whom the majority are entirely unknown and carry no weight." The journal found Carrington's statements about curing all disease by prolonged fasts unsupported by scientific evidence. In none of the cases cited was the patient under the observation of Carrington. The review noted that Carrington took "all the facts either reported by others or as related to him in letters sent by the fasters." It was criticized in the Nature journal as unscientific. The reviewer stated that Carrington made many assertions unsupported by evidence and "his book is a strange medley, and hardly merits serious consideration in a scientific journal... [but is] remarkable as an instance of the lengths to which a fad can be carried."

Carrington was a germ theory denialist and proponent of natural hygiene. He held a vitalist view of health and denied that energy is derived from food. Instead, he believed energy is obtained during sleep by an external, all pervading cosmic energy.

== Reception ==
Carrington's books have received positive reviews for their accessible writing style and detailed research. However, his unorthodox views on dieting, fasting and nutrition have been criticized by medical health experts.

Henry Gilroy wrote that Carrington "went on to the end of his life as a true pioneer and an indefatigable searcher for truth. I was proud to be his friend", he noted however that Carrington was a "half-assed amateur magician —a pretty bad one but most persistent. One night we threw a spook-show to raise money for the American Psychical Institute and it was really pathetic... He was a great psychical researcher but a godawful magician, fumbling almost every trick he tried." Anthropologist and skeptic Edward Clodd described Carrington as an "adept at disclosing spiritualistic chicanery, but, strangely enough, believing in a residuum of genuine phenomena."

Psychologists Leonard Zusne and Warren H. Jones note that although Carrington declared some mediums to be genuine, The Physical Phenomena of Spiritualism is a "monumental work on fraudulent 19th-century spiritualism." Journalist Wilfred Whitten described the work as "one of the most extraordinary books that I have read for a long time" and praised Carrington for his entertaining writing and exposure of spiritualist trickery.

According to Arthur Conan Doyle, Carrington was not popular with spiritualists. Magician Harry Houdini had discussed magic and spiritualism on various occasions with Carrington. Houdini wrote that Carrington's book The Physical Phenomena of Spiritualism "is certainly the best ever written on the subject" but had doubts about Carrington for supporting the mediumship of Palladino, a medium who had been frequently exposed. According to the psychical researcher J. Malcolm Bird, during a meeting Houdini and Carrington's differences emerged and they argued "well into the night". Historian Ruth Brandon has described Carrington and Houdini as "old enemies", noting their differences of opinion on the Crandon case.

Skeptic Joseph McCabe wrote that Carrington was a talented conjuror who had exposed the tricks of mediums but was deceived by Eusapia Palladino. Strong criticism of Carrington's investigation of Palladino has come from psychologist Millais Culpin (1920) and philosopher Paul Kurtz (1989). Culpin criticized Carrington for not educating himself about psychological factors; he suggested that Palladino's behaviour was a condition of hysterical dissociation but he had failed to recognize it. Kurtz has written that Carrington attended unofficial sessions with Palladino and reported on several occasions she "transferred her telekinetic powers" to him to move objects without physical contact. Kurtz wrote that Carrington's testimony was uncorroborated by other witnesses and that he was either a naïve believer or a "fraudulent hoaxer".

== Published work ==
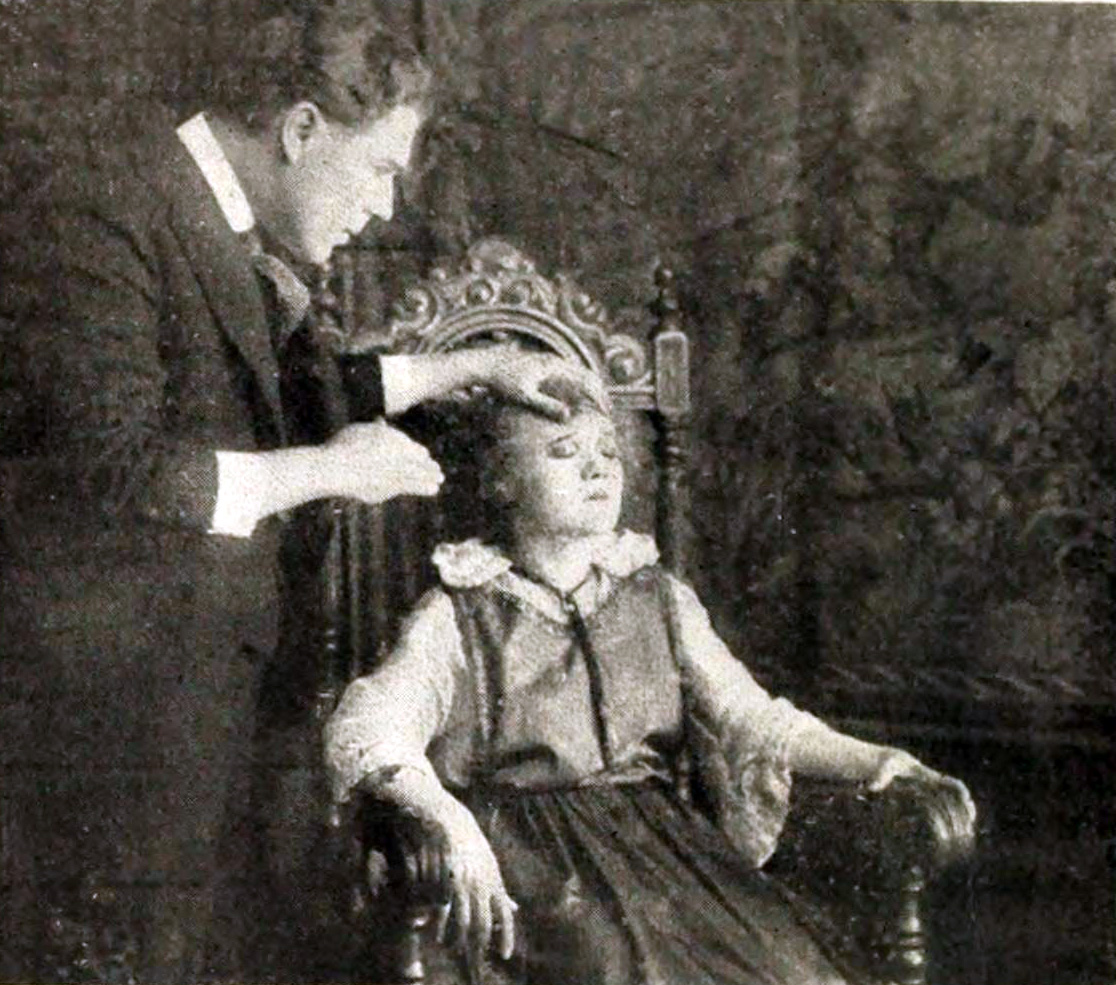
The Mysteries of Myra (1916)

Carrington was the primary consultant and contributor of story ideas for The Mysteries of Myra, a 15-episode silent film series released in 1916 (photo to the right), which introduced "realistic" supernatural concepts such as automatic writing and astral projection to the screen. The leading character, Dr. Payson Alden, the first paranormal investigator of the cinema, was modeled after Carrington himself. (The novel developed from Carrington's ideas and the screenplay of the series were written by Charles Goddard.)

Carrington published more than 100 books and pamphlets; the following is a selection of some of his works:

Parapsychology titles

- The Physical Phenomena of Spiritualism (Boston : H. B. Turner & Co., 1907)
- The Coming Science (Boston : Small, Maynard, 1908)
- Eusapia Palladino and her Phenomena (New York : B.W. Dodge & Co., 1909)
- Spiritism and Psychology (with Théodore Flournoy) (1911)
- Death, its Causes and Phenomena (1911)
- Death Deferred (1912)
- Hindu Magic (Kansas City, Mo.: The Sphinx, 1913)
- Personal Experiences in Spiritualism (Including the Official Account and Record of the American Palladino Séances) (London, T. W. Laurie, ltd, 1913)
- Personal Experiences in Spiritualism (1918)
- The Problems of Psychical Research (New York, Dodd, Mead, 1914)
- True Ghost Stories (New York: J. S. Ogilvie Pub. Co., 1915)
- Zenobia; (a dream of ancient Egypt). A psychic drama in seven scenes (1916)
- Psychical Phenomena and the War (New York : Dodd, Mead, 1918)
- Modern Psychical Phenomena (London, Paul, 1919)
- Higher Psychical Development (New York : Dodd, Mead, 1920)
- Your Psychic Powers, and How to Develop Them (1920)
- Death: The Causes and Phenomena, with Special Reference to Immortality (1921)
- Spiritualism (with James Joseph Walsh) (1925)
- The Projection of the Astral Body (with Sylvan Muldoon) (1929)
- The Story of Psychic Science (1930)
- Woman's Love Life (1930)
- Loaves and Fishes: A Study of the Miracles, of the Resurrection, and of the Future Life in the Light of Modern Psychic Knowledge (1935)
- Houdini and Conan Doyle (with Bernard M. L. Ernst) (1932)
- A Primer in Psychical Research (1933)
- The Psychic World (1937)
- Essays in the Occult (1947)
- The Invisible World (1949)
- Haunted People: Story of the Poltergeist down the Centuries (with Nandor Fodor) (1951)
- Psychic Oddities (1952)
- Mysterious Psychic Phenomena (1954)
- The Case for Psychic Survival (1957)

Little Blue Book titles

- Great Men of Science (1923) (64 pages, Little Blue Book No. 409)
- The Nature of Dreams (1923) (64 pages, Little Blue Book No. 417)
- Life: Its Origin and Nature (1923) (64 pages, Little Blue Book No. 419)
- Yoga Philosophy, An Outline of the Secret Hindu Teachings (1923) (128 pages, Little Blue Book No. 421)
- Psychology for Beginners (1924) (64 pages, Little Blue Book No. 491)
- Chemistry For Beginners (1924) (64 pages, Little Blue Book No. 679)
- Food and Diet in Relation to Life and Health (1925) (64 pages, Little Blue Book No. 761)
- Astronomy for Beginners (1925) (60 pages, Little Blue Book No. 895)
- Hindu Magic Self Taught (1928) (32 pages, Little Blue Book Vol. 1277)
- Ventriloquism Self Taught (1928) (32 pages, Little Blue Book Vol. 1278)
- Fasting for Health, How to Fast; Why Fasting Helps; What to Do; How to Break the Fast (1928) (32 pages, Little Blue Book Vol. 1321)

Natural Hygiene and Fasting titles

- Vitality, Fasting, and Nutrition (New York, Rebman company, 1908)
- The Natural Food of Man (1912)
- Food and Diet (1925)
- Valuable Health Hints (1947)
- The Argument for Vegetarianism (1951)
- The Scientific Basis of Vegetarianism (1951)
- Fasting For Health and Long Life (1953)
- The History of Natural Hygiene (1954)
- Hints on Fasting Well (1956), 61 pages (first author was Marie Sweet)
- The Hygienic Way of Life (1956)
- Physical and Mental Factors in Health (1956)
- Save Your Life By Fasting (1969)
- The Fruitarian Diet is a 44-page extract from The Natural Food of Man (1912)

Articles

- The Philadelphia Record. (1907). In the Land of Spooks With the Spirit Fakers. 22 September.
- The New York Times. (1908). Ingenious Frauds at Lily Dale Seances. 8 March.
- The New York Times. (1909). Detecting the Tricks of the Mediums. 24 October.
- New Zealand Tablet. (1909). Fraudulent Mediums. 11 November.
- The Cosmopolitan. Proper Food for Perfect Health. pp. 326–330.
- The New York Times. (1914). Spiritualism: A Record of Experiences in Psychical Research. 25 January.
- Popular Science. (1919). Tying Knots in Endless Ropes. McClure, Phillips and Company.
- The Sunday Tribune. (1928). Dr. Hereward Carrington, psychic investigator, at his desk. 8 January.
- St. Peterburg Times. (1931). Psychic Study to Grip World, Writer Avers. 1 February.
- The Oxnard Daily Courier. (1933). Spirit Detector. 25 July.

== Gallery ==
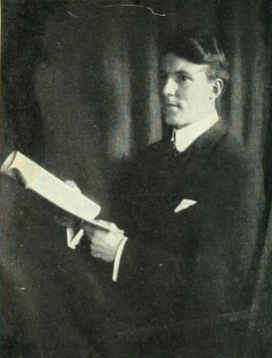
Carrington in 1909

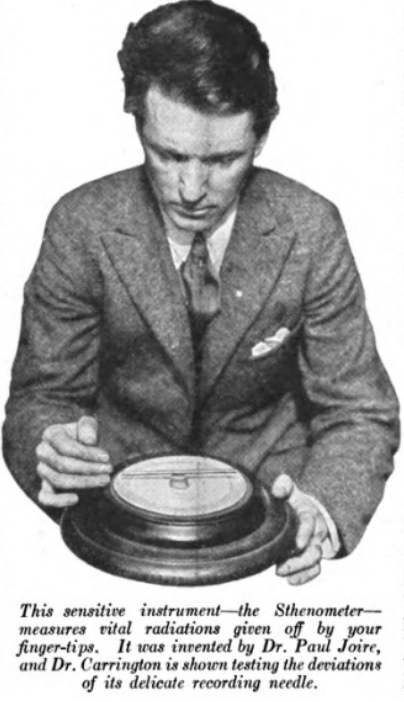
Carrington testing the "Sthenometer" of Paul Joire

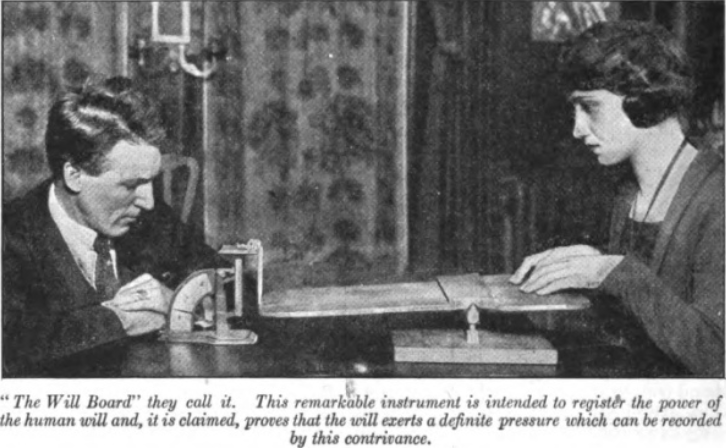
Carrington testing the "Will Board" of Sidney Altrutz

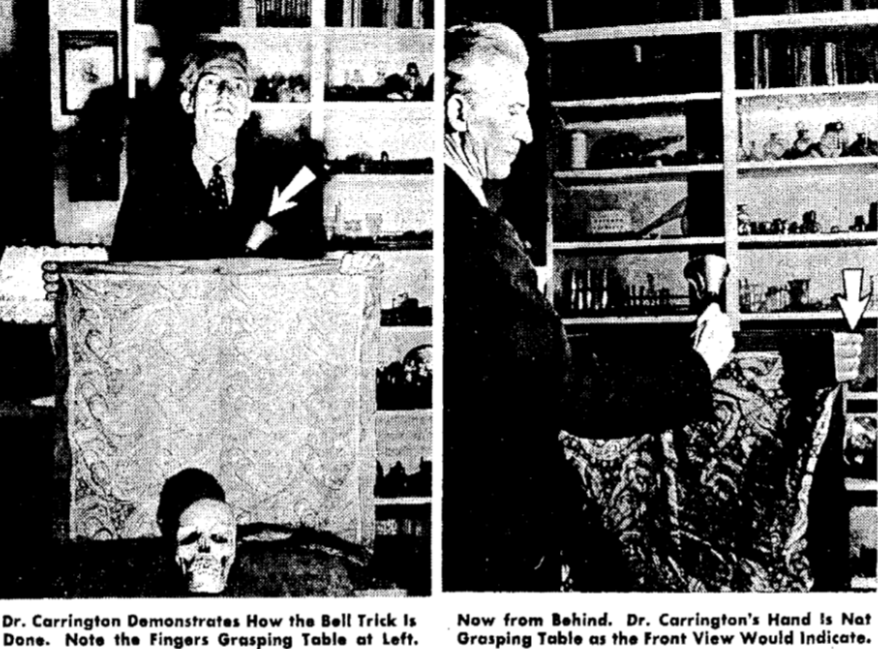
Carrington demonstrating a ball trick

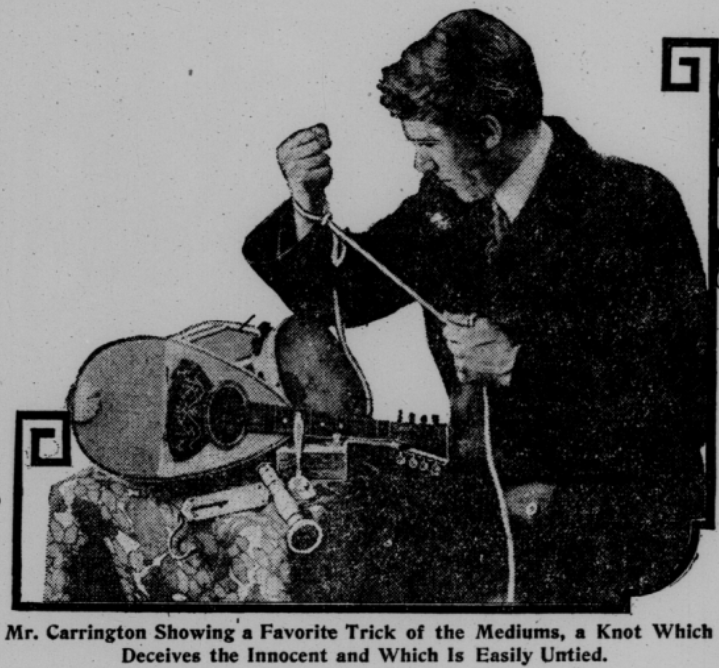
Carrington demonstrating a knot trick
