= Everard Feilding =

English barrister, naval intelligence officer and psychical researcher

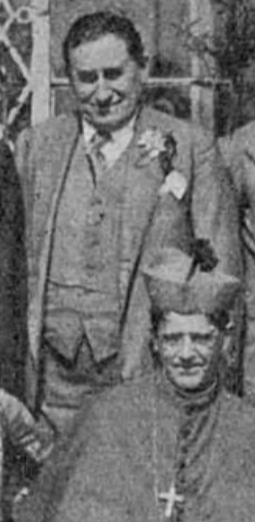
- Everard Feilding with Dudley Cary-Elwes, Roman Catholic Bishop of Northampton.
- Born: 6 March 1867
- Died: 8 February 1936 (aged 68)
- Occupations: Barrister, psychical researcher

Francis Henry Everard Joseph Feilding (6 March 1867 – 8 February 1936) best known as Everard Feilding was an English barrister, naval intelligence officer and psychical researcher.

== Career ==
As a teenager, Feilding worked as a midshipman for the Royal Navy during the Egyptian campaign in 1882. He was educated at Oscott College and attended Trinity College, Cambridge in 1887, he obtained his bachelors of law degree in 1890. Feilding was a Catholic, he began his interest in psychical research from his visit to Lourdes in 1892. He was secretary of the Society for Psychical Research from 1903 to 1920. His father was Rudolph Feilding, 8th Earl of Denbigh and his brother Rudolph Feilding, 9th Earl of Denbigh. A pioneer of rubber planting in Malaya, he was chairman of Kuala Lumpur Rubber Company in 1906.

Feilding served as a lieutenant in the Royal Naval Volunteer Reserve (RNVR) and worked for the British Intelligence Staff in Egypt and Palestine (1915–1919). Feilding married the psychic medium Stanisława Tomczyk in 1919. It is alleged by biographers that he was a friend of the occultist Aleister Crowley.

Psychical researcher Eric Dingwall wrote that Feilding was a "member of one of the most distinguished Catholic families in England" and was "one of the most acute investigators of alleged supernormal phenomena that this country has ever produced."

== Feilding report ==
Feilding is best-known for his investigation of the Italian medium Eusapia Palladino. In 1908, the SPR appointed a committee of three to examine her in Naples. The committee consisted of W. W. Baggally, Hereward Carrington and Everard Feilding. Although the investigators caught Palladino cheating during the séances, they were convinced Palladino had produced genuine paranormal phenomena such as levitations of the table, movement of the curtains, movement of objects from behind the curtain and touches from hands. In 1909, all three investigators wrote a report on the medium in the Proceedings of the Society for Psychical Research. The report became known as the "Feilding report" and has been a source of debate between psychical researchers and sceptics.

Frank Podmore in his book The Newer Spiritualism (1910) wrote a comprehensive critique of their report. Podmore said that the report provided insufficient information for crucial moments and the investigators representation of the witness accounts contained contradictions and inconsistencies as to who was holding Palladino's feet and hands. Podmore found that the accounts among the investigators conflicted as to who they claimed to have observed the incident. Podmore wrote that the report "at almost every point leaves obvious loopholes for trickery." The psychologist C. E. M. Hansel criticised the report based on the conditions of the séances being susceptible to trickery. Hansel noted that they were performed in semi-dark conditions, held in the late night or early morning introducing the possibility of fatigue and the "investigators had a strong belief in the supernatural, hence they would be emotionally involved."

Although originally convinced of her alleged powers, Feilding attended séances with Palladino in 1910 with the magician William S. Marriott and concluded her mediumship was fraudulent.

Paul Kurtz has noted that "Skeptic's question the first Feilding report because in a subsequent test by Feilding and other tests by scientists, Palladino had been caught cheating."

== Abbé Vachère case ==
In 1914, Feilding with Maud Gonne and W. B. Yeats visited Mirebeau to investigate an alleged miracle of a bleeding oleograph that was in the possession of priest Abbé Vachère. Feilding took a blood sample to the Lister Institute of Preventive Medicine. They concluded that it was not human blood.

In 1915, Feilding returned to Mirebeau. He made several visits to Vachère's home. The oleograph had been placed in his chapel. Feilding found that it was wet but he did not directly observe the picture to have bled. As a test, he locked the chapel door and placed a slip of paper in the hinge. He discovered hours later that although the picture was wet, the paper had been dislodged. The evidence was negative but Feilding did not believe Vachère was guilty of deception.

In 1920, Feilding and his wife visited Vachère. This time he alleged that a small statue of Jesus in the chapel had also bled. Feilding and his wife investigated this claim. His wife suspected that Vachère sprinkled water on the picture from a small pot she found behind some flowers in the room. Feilding took a blood sample and this time the results showed it was human blood. He did not come to any definite conclusion but because of the evidence suggestive of fraud, sceptics have dismissed the case as a hoax.

== Other investigations ==
Feilding was a friend of the neurologist Henry Head who he attempted to get involved with psychical research. He invited Head to a "ghost hunt" at an alleged haunted house known as "Pickpocket Hall" on his brother's estate in Pantasaph. He wrote in a letter to Wilfrid Meynell that they spent a few nights in the derelict house but the result was a failure. He also persuaded Head to investigate the shrines at Lourdes in the summer of 1895.

Feilding with W. W. Baggally exposed the materialization medium Christopher Chambers as a fraud in 1905. A false moustache was discovered in the séance room which he used to fabricate the spirit materialisations. In 1911, Feilding attended two séance sittings with the medium Etta Wriedt. He suspected that the phenomena may have been fraudulent. He was "specifically excluded" from attending further séances with Wriedt.

== Publications ==
Books

- Sittings with Eusapia Palladino and Other Studies (1963)

Papers

- Baggally, W. W; Feilding, Everard; Johnson, Alice. (1906). Sittings with Mr Chambers. Journal of the Society for Psychical Research 12: 197-203.
- Baggally, W. W; Carington, Hereward; Feilding, Everard. (1909). Report on a Series of Sittings with Eusapia Palladino. Proceedings of the Society for Psychical Research 23: 309-569.
- Feilding, Everard; Marriott, William S. (1910). Report on Further Series of Sittings with Eusapia Palladino at Naples. Proceedings of the Society for Psychical Research 15: 20-32.
- Feilding, Everard; Johnson, Alice. (1914). Report on Some Experiments in Thought-Transference. Journal of the Society for Psychical Research 16: 164-167.
- Feilding, Everard. (1915). Note on the English Sittings with Miss Tomczyk. Journal of the Society for Psychical Research 17: 28-31.
- Fielding, Everard. (1922). An Experiment in Faking "Spirit" Photographs. Journal of the Society for Psychical Research 20: 219-223.
- Feilding, Everard. (1930). The Case of Abbé Vachère. (1930). Transactions of the Fourth International Congress for Psychical Research.
- Feilding, Everard. (1932). More Alleged Occurrences of the Rope Trick. Journal of the Society for Psychical Research 27: 281-286.
