= Maria Ochorowicz-Monatowa =

Polish cookery writer

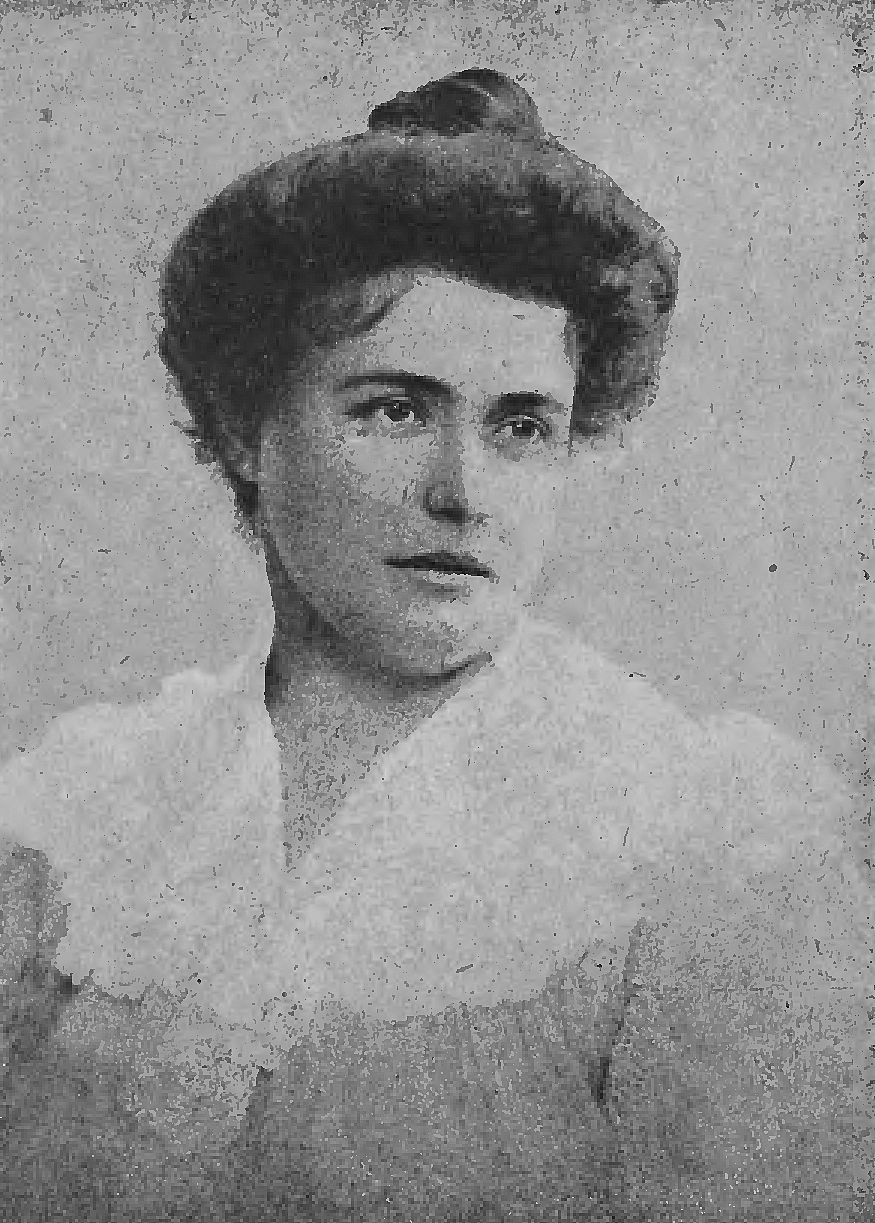
- Maria Ochorowicz-Monatowa (photograph taken before 1910)
- Born: Maria Leszczyńska; 1866; Zakopane, Poland
- Died: September 1925 (aged 58–59)
- Occupations: writer and editor
- Known for: cookery works
- Notable work: The Universal Cookbook

Maria Ochorowicz-Monatowa (née Leszczyńska; 1866 - September 1925) was a Polish writer and editor, mainly of culinary works.

== Personal life ==
Maria Leszczyńska was born in 1866. She married the philosopher and inventor Julian Ochorowicz in 1888 and they lived in Warsaw but also spent time in Paris. They were divorced in 1899 and she later married the literary critic, translator and lawyer Henryk Monat. They had common interests in writing and cookery.

She died in September 1925 in Zakopane.

== Literary works ==
She is known for her work as a writer and editor in magazines on topics related to cookery and the household. She was skilled at cookery, and when she was living in Paris her Polish dishes were much admired. She also sought out information on French and Austrian cuisine and adapted the recipes for Polish tastes. Her recipes were published in Bluszcz, an illustrated women's weekly published in Warsaw at that time. She edited the Warsaw biweekly Świat Kobiecy (Women's World). She also wrote articles on running a household, published in Krakow magazines. She was active in the "Strzecha" association.

She was the author of Uniwersalna książka kucharska (The Universal Cookbook or Polish Cookery) (Lviv, 1910). The contents were aimed at homes with modest incomes as well as those who were well off, with recipes adapted to require fewer ingredients. It included well-known dishes such as borscht and pierogi but also vegetarian recipes, seasonal ingredients, aspects of nutrition and dietetics, kitchen hygiene and a consideration of gut heath. There were practical suggestions on food storage and society's expectations of events such as dinner parties. The book ran to 730 pages with many illustrations. Further editions were produced in 1913 and 1926. The book received awards at hygiene exhibitions in Warsaw in 1910 and 1926.
