= Bernard M. L. Ernst =

American lawyer and magician (1879–1938)

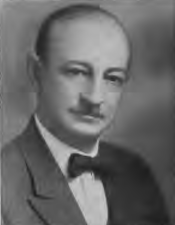
- Born: March 17, 1879
- Died: November 28, 1938 (aged 59)
- Occupations: Lawyer, magician

Bernard Morris Leon Ernst (March 17, 1879 – November 28, 1938) most well known as Bernard M. L. Ernst was an American lawyer, magician and associate of Harry Houdini.

== Career ==
Ernst was born in Uniontown, Alabama. He received his LL.B from Columbia University in 1905. At Columbia, Bernard M. L. Ernst was a member of the Philolexian Society. He began working as a lawyer for a firm in Boston in 1909, he also worked on the legal counsel for the Eastern Massachusetts Street Railway. In the 1930s he was a council member of the Metropolitan League of Jewish Community Associations in New York City.

== Personal life ==
He married Roberta C. Claus on 4 August, 1908. Ernst was Jewish. He was a member of many organizations including the American Bar Association, New York County Lawyers' Association, Phi Delta Theta, National Vaudeville Artists Association, American Society for Psychical Research and the International Brotherhood of Magicians. His son, Richard C. Ernst, married Susan Bloomingdale, daughter of Samuel Bloomingdale.

== Magic ==
Ernst took interest in magic and became the personal attorney for the magician Harry Houdini and the legal representative of his estate. Ernst had lectured on Houdini and magic at Columbia University. He managed the correspondence and private papers for Houdini, he also collected magic memorabilia. In 1926, he succeeded Houdini as President of the Society of American Magicians.

His son Richard Charles Ernst (1915-1984) was given his father's memorabilia which he made available for Houdini biographers

== Publications ==
- Preface to Walter B. Gibson Houdini's Escapes and Magic (1930)
- Houdini and Conan Doyle: The Story of a Strange Friendship (with Hereward Carrington) (1932)
- Houdini's Magic (with Walter Brown Gibson) (1932)
- Preface to Royal Vale Heath Mathemagic: Magic, Puzzles and Games with Numbers (1933)
