= W. W. Baggally =

British psychical researcher

William Wortley Baggally (c. 1848 – 14 March 1928), most well known as W. W. Baggally, was a British psychical researcher who investigated spiritualist mediums.

== Career ==
Baggally joined the Society for Psychical Research (SPR) in 1896 in the hope of finding evidence for life after death. Baggally was an amateur conjuror and had studied the trick methods of mediums.

In 1908, the SPR appointed a committee of three to examine the medium Eusapia Palladino in Naples. The committee consisted of Baggally, Hereward Carrington and Everard Feilding. Although the investigators caught Palladino cheating during the séances, they were convinced Palladino had produced genuine paranormal phenomena such as levitations of the table, movement of the curtains, movement of objects from behind the curtain and touches from hands. In 1909, all three investigators wrote a report on the medium in the Proceedings of the Society for Psychical Research.

Baggally was favourable of Palladino having attended séances before the 1908 investigation in Naples. According to the spiritualist Arthur Conan Doyle "Mr. W. W. Baggally, a member of the Council, had been investigating psychic phenomena for more than thirty-five years, and during that time—with the exception, perhaps, of a few incidents at a séance with Eusapia a few years before—had never witnessed a single genuine physical phenomenon."

Frank Podmore in his book The Newer Spiritualism (1910) wrote a comprehensive critique of their report. Podmore said that the report provided insufficient information for crucial moments and the investigators representation of the witness accounts contained contradictions and inconsistencies as to who was holding Palladino's feet and hands. Podmore found accounts among the investigators conflicted as to who they claimed to have observed the incident. Podmore wrote that the report "at almost every point leaves obvious loopholes for trickery." The psychologist C. E. M. Hansel criticized the report based on the conditions of the séances being susceptible to trickery. Hansel noted that they were performed in semi-dark conditions, held in the late night or early morning introducing the possibility of fatigue and the "investigators had a strong belief in the supernatural, hence they would be emotionally involved."

In June 1912, Baggally attended a séance with the medium Etta Wriedt and was impressed by her direct-voice mediumship. During the same year, Wriedt was exposed as a fraud by Kristian Birkeland.

After interviewing witnesses, Baggally endorsed the alleged 'haunting' phenomena that occurred at the home of Rev. Charles Lakeman Tweedale. However, Daniel Cohen noted a problem with the case, stating that Baggally "didn't see either the phantom aunt or her phantom dog. As with most investigations of hauntings, you either believe the witnesses or you don't, for there is no other evidence."

== Reception ==
Baggally has been highly praised by parapsychologists but has drawn criticism from skeptics for his unscientific investigation of the medium Eusapia Palladino.

According to the magician Harry Houdini, Baggally was a believer in telepathy who had endorsed the mentalists Julius and Agnes Zancig as genuine telepaths, when they were actually "clever, silent and signal codists."

Psychical researcher Eric Dingwall wrote that before attending séances with Palladino in 1908, Baggally "had studied trick methods, performed them himself" and was "almost totally sceptical as to the reality of any supernormal physical phenomena whatsoever." However, others have noted Baggally was already believer in the paranormal.

Psychologist D. H. Rawcliffe has heavily criticized the Feilding-Baggally-Carrington report on Palladino, describing it as unscientific. According to Rawcliffe the medium directed the conditions of the investigation throughout and there was faulty control of her hands and feet.

== Publications ==
- W. W. Baggally (1909). Sittings With Carancini. Journal of the Society for Psychical Research 14: 193–211.
- W. W. Baggally, Hereward Carrington, Everard Feilding (1909). Report on a Series of Sittings with Eusapia Palladino. Proceedings of the Society for Psychical Research 23: 309–569.
- W. W. Baggally (1912). Report on Sittings with Charles Bailey, the Australian Apport Medium. Journal of the Society for Psychical Research 15: 194–208.
- W. W. Baggally (1912). Dowsing Experiments with Mr. J. E. Journal of the Society for Psychical Research 15: 243–249.
- W. W. Baggally (1920). Telepathy, Genuine and Fraudulent (With a preface by Oliver Lodge). London: Methuen & Co.
- W. W. Baggally (1920). The Analogy Observed Between the Form of Certain Lines on Glass Plates. In Frank A. Hotblack. "A New Activity?": A Treatise on Mrs. Dickinson's Discovery of a "New Radio-Activity". Jarrolds.
