= Julian Ochorowicz =

Polish philosopher and psychologist

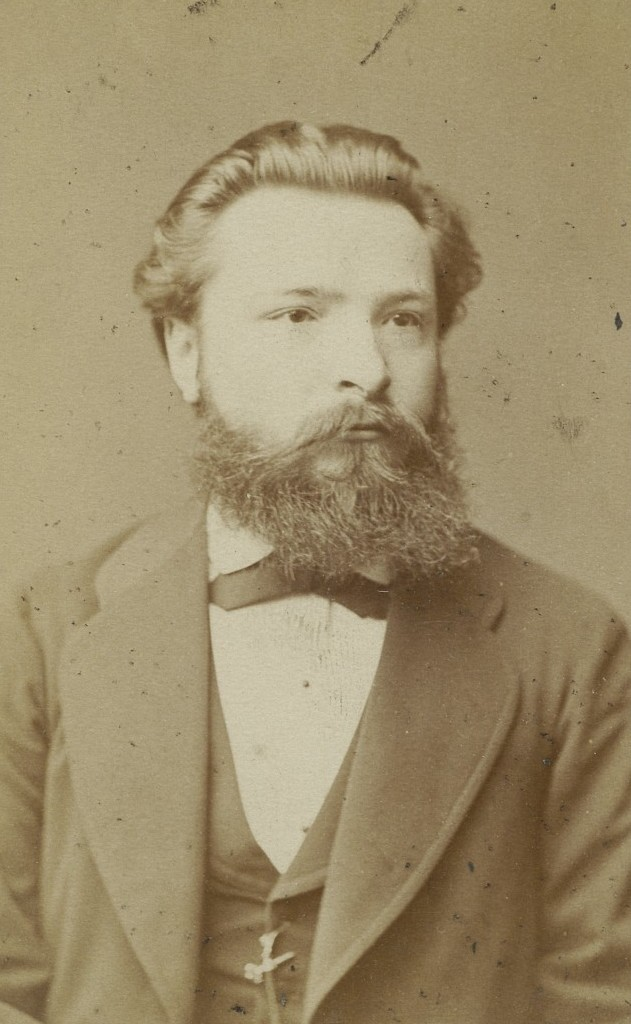
- Ochorowicz, ca. 1880
- Born: February 23, 1850; Radzymin, Russian Empire
- Died: May 1, 1917 (aged 67); Warsaw, Russian Empire
- Spouse: Maria Ochorowicz-Monatowa (1888 - 1899, divorce)

Education
- Education: University of Warsaw; University of Leipzig (PhD, 1874)

Philosophical work
- Era: 19th-century philosophy
- Region: Western philosophy
- School: Positivism; Polish Positivism
- Main interests: Experimental psychology, hypnosis, occultism, spiritualism, telepathy
- Notable ideas: Ideoplastia

Julian Leopold Ochorowicz (Polish pronunciation: ['juljan lɛˈɔpɔld ɔxɔˈrɔvit͡ʂ]; outside Poland also known as Julien Ochorowitz; Radzymin, 23 February 1850 – 1 May 1917, Warsaw) was a Polish philosopher, psychologist, inventor (precursor of radio and television), poet, publicist, and leading exponent of Polish Positivism.

== Life ==
Julian Ochorowicz was the son of Julian and Jadwiga, née Sumińska.

He studied natural sciences at Warsaw University, graduating in 1871. Subsequently he studied under Wilhelm Wundt at Leipzig University, where in 1874 he received a doctorate with a thesis "On Conditions of Consciousness".

Returning to Warsaw, in 1874-75 he was editor-in-chief of the popular Polish-language periodicals, Niwa (The Field) and Opiekun Domowy (The Home Companion). From 1881 he was assistant professor (docent) of psychology and natural philosophy at Lwów University.

In 1882 he was sent to Paris, France, where he spent several years. Later, from 1907, he would be co-director of the Institut General Psychologique.

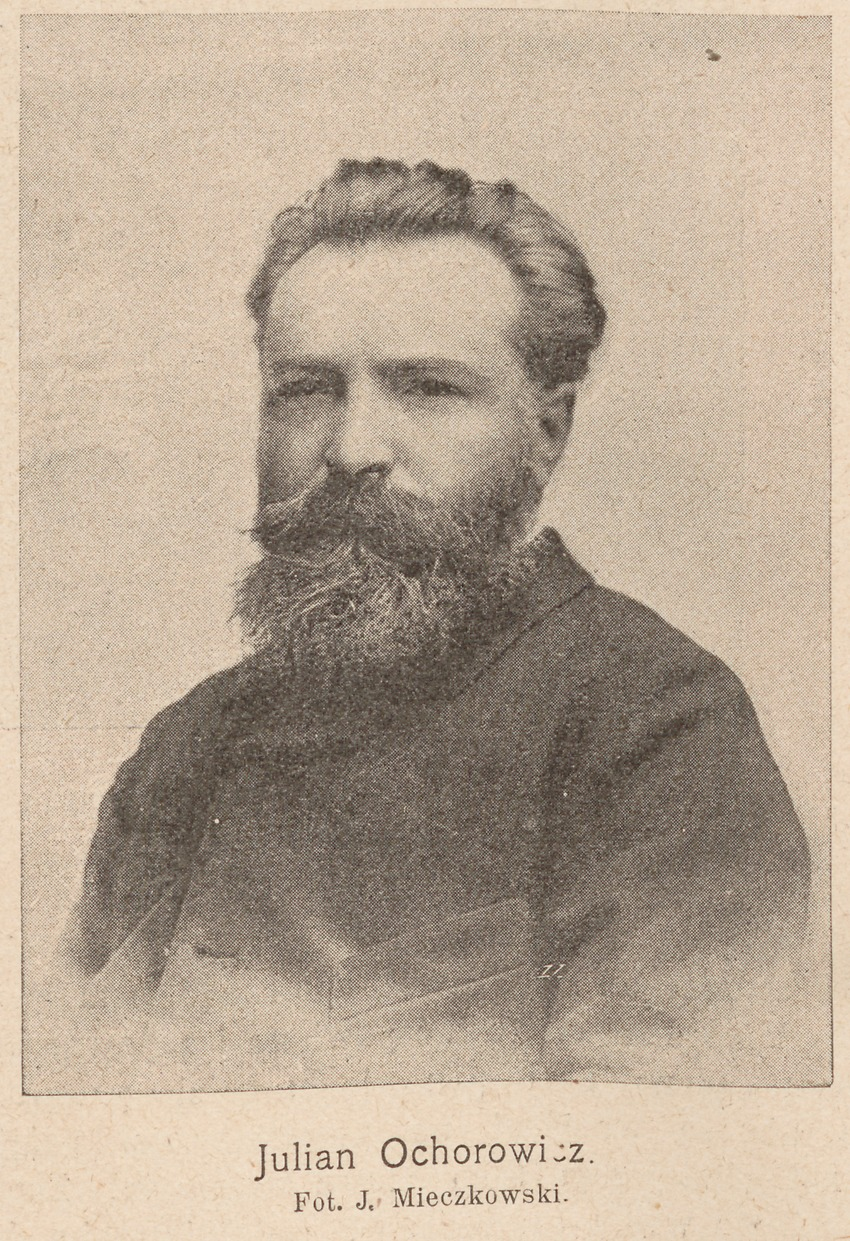
Ochorowicz, 1900

Returning to Warsaw, from 1900 Ochorowicz was president of Kasa Literacka (The Literary Fund). He published pedagogical papers in Encyklopedia Wychowawcza (The Encyclopedia of Education).

Ochorowicz was a pioneer of empirical research in psychology and conducted studies into occultism, Spiritualism, hypnosis, and telepathy. His most popular works included Wstęp i pogląd ogólny na filozofię pozytywną (An Introduction to, and Overview of, Positive Philosophy, 1872) and Jak należy badać duszę? (How Study the Soul?, 1869).

Ochorowicz the poet published in Przegląd Tygodniowy (The Weekly Review) under the pen name "Julian Mohort". He wrote the poem, "Naprzód" ("Onward", 1873), regarded as the Polish Positivists' manifesto.

Ochorowicz, a trained philosopher with a doctorate from the University of Leipzig, became the leader of the Positivist movement in Poland. In 1872 he wrote: "We shall call a Positivist, anyone who bases assertions on verifiable evidence, does not express himself categorically about doubtful things, and does not speak at all about those that are inaccessible."

He experimented with microphones and with apparatus for sending sound and light over distances, and so is regarded a precursor of radio and television.

In 1877 Ochorowicz elaborated a concept for a monochromatic television, to be constructed as a screen comprising bulbs that would convert transmitted images into groups of light points. In 1878 he published an article "O możności zbudowania przyrządu do przesyłania obrazów optycznych na dowolną odległość" ("On the Possibility of Constructing an Instrument for Transmitting Visual Images at a Distance") which predicted the basic principle of television.

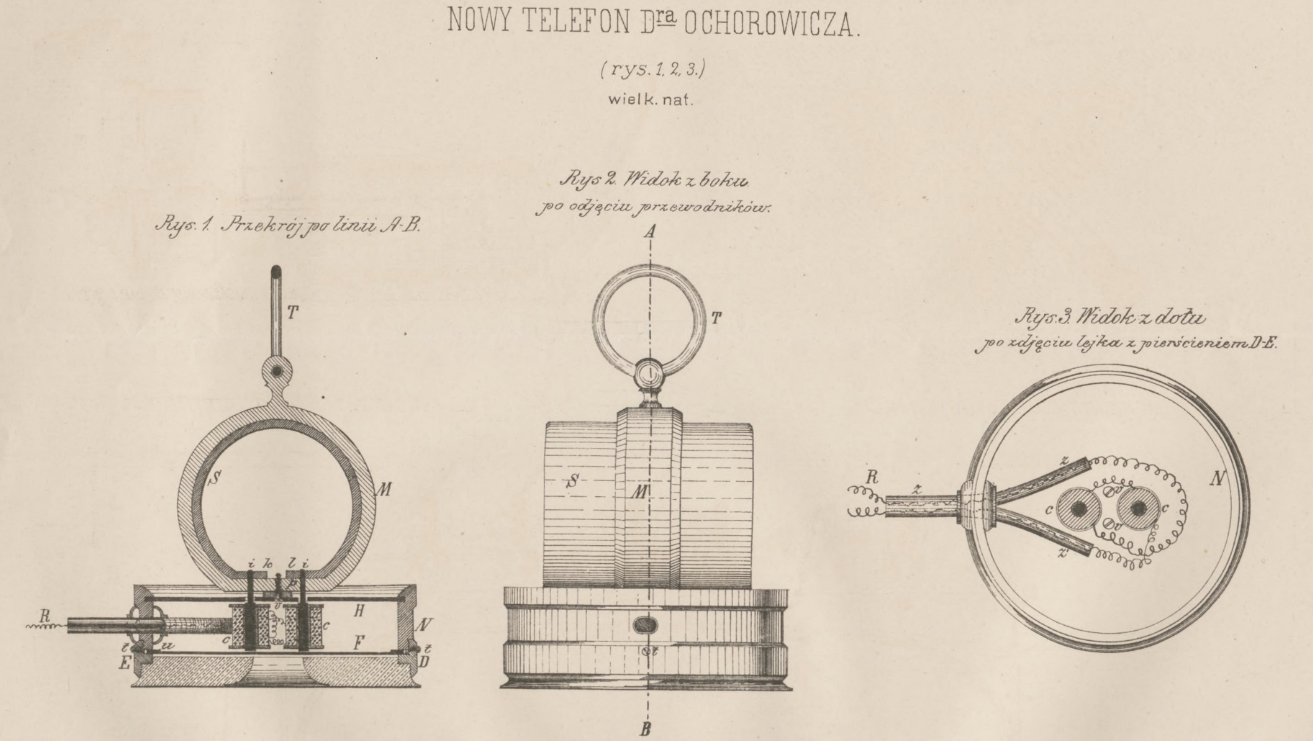
Telephone with 2 diaphragms, made by Ochorowicz

In 1885, on several occasions, he demonstrated his own improved telephones. In Paris he connected the Ministry of Posts and Telegraph building with the Paris Opera, 4 kilometers distant. Ochorowicz received a French patent for his technology (168,569. Brevet de quinze ans, 29 avril 1885; docteur Ochorowicz, à Paris, boulevard Saint-Germain, nº 24. - Système téléphonique reproduisant la parole à voie haute.), and Bruno Abakanowicz produced Ochorowicz's telephones for some 20 years.

At the Antwerp World's Fair, he set up a connection with Brussels, 45 km distant. He linked St. Petersburg, Russia, with Bologoye, 320 km distant. His microphone impressed the International Society of Electricians and the French Society of Physics.

Ochorowicz conducted experiments at a psychological laboratory that he established at Wisła, Poland.

== Personal life ==
Ochorowicz married Maria Leszczyńska in 1888. They lived in Warsaw and Paris. She was well-known as a writer, especially on cookery and household hygiene, and as a magazine editor. They were divorced in 1899.

== Prus ==
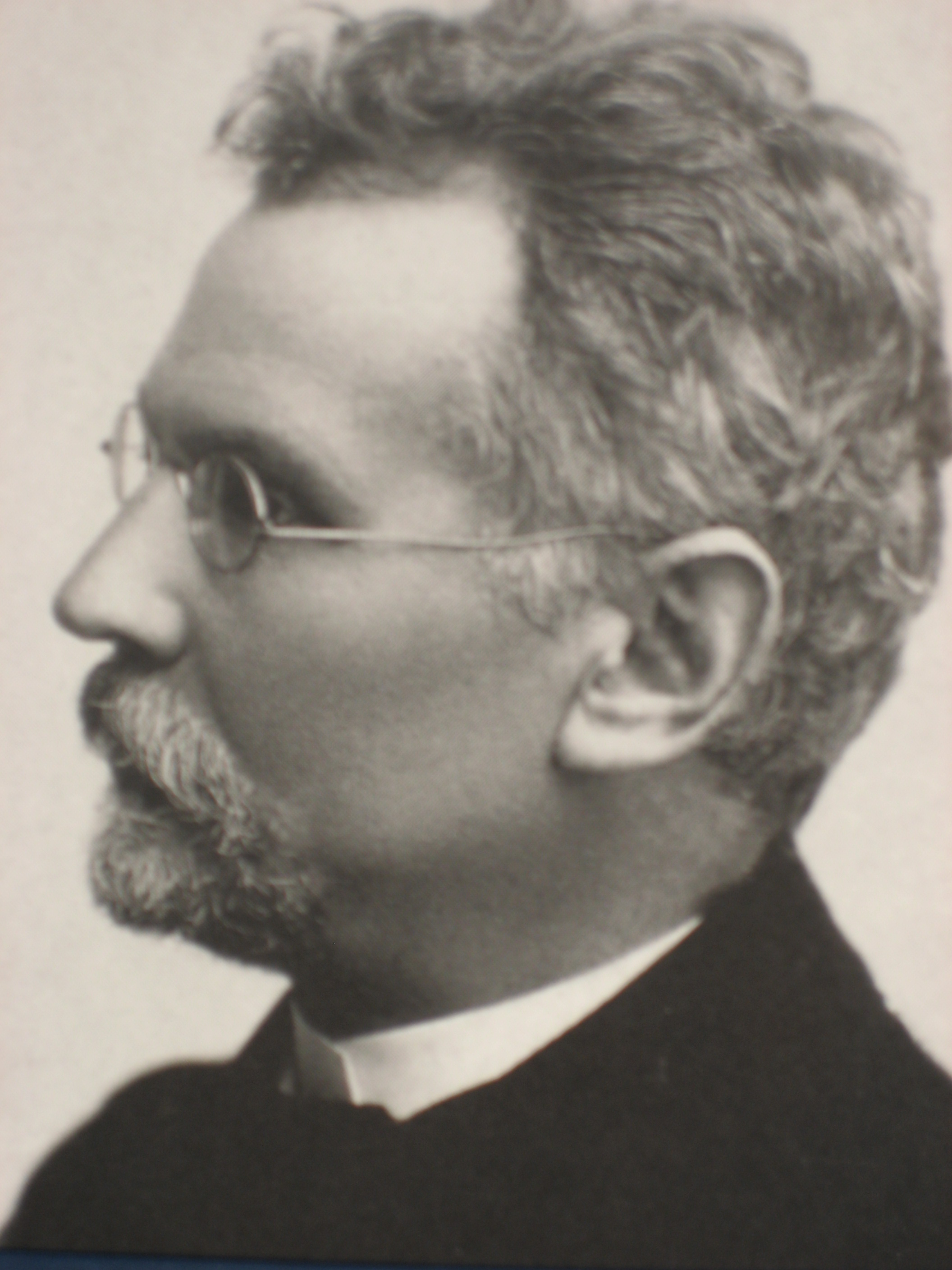
Bolesław Prus

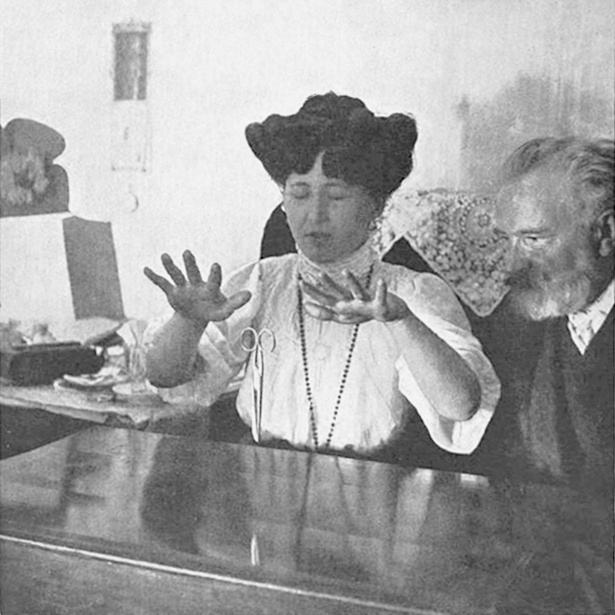
Ochorowicz watches Stanisława Tomczyk levitate scissors, Wisla, 1909.

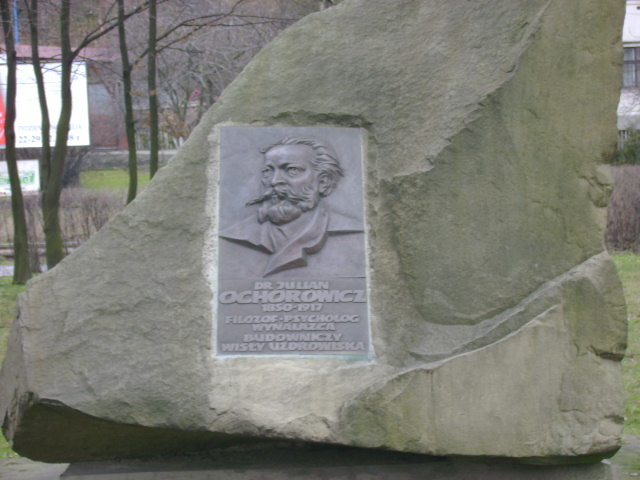
Monument to Ochorowicz at Wisła, which he built into a health resort and tourist destination

Julian Ochorowicz was a former Lublin secondary-school and Warsaw University schoolmate of Bolesław Prus, who portrayed him in his 1889 novel, The Doll, as the scientist "Julian Ochocki." Ochorowicz, after returning to Warsaw from Paris, in 1893 delivered several public lectures on ancient Egyptian knowledge. These evidently helped inspire Prus to write (1894–95) his sole historical novel, Pharaoh. Ochorowicz provided Prus books on Egyptology that he had brought back from Paris.

Also in 1893, Ochorowicz introduced Prus to the Italian Spiritualist, Eusapia Palladino, whom he had brought to Warsaw from her mediumistic tour in St. Petersburg, Russia. Prus attended a number of séances conducted by Palladino and incorporated several prominent spiritualist-inspired scenes into his 1895 novel Pharaoh.

Ochorowicz hosted Palladino in Warsaw from November 1893 to January 1894. Regarding the phenomena demonstrated at Palladino's séances, he concluded against the spirit hypothesis and for a hypothesis that these phenomena were caused by a "fluidic action" and were performed at the expense of the medium's own powers and those of the other participants in the séances. Ochorowicz, with Frederic William Henry Myers, Charles Richet and Oliver Lodge, investigated Palladino in the summer of 1894 at Richet's house on the Île du Grand Ribaud in the Mediterranean. Myers and Richet claimed that furniture moved during the séances and that some of the phenomena were the result of a supernatural agency. However, Richard Hodgson claimed there was inadequate control during the séances and that the precautions described did not rule out trickery. Hodgson wrote that all the phenomena "described could be accounted for on the assumption that Eusapia could get a hand or foot free." Lodge, Myers and Richet disagreed, but Hodgson was later proven correct in the Cambridge sittings as Palladino was observed to have used tricks exactly the way he had described them.

After his divorce, he decided to make some changes in his life: he bought a piece of land at Wisła in Poland's mountains, built himself a villa as well as four additional houses for tourists, and proceeded to live on the rentals.

About 20 June 1900, Prus and his household arrived to visit. In July Prus traveled to nearby Kraków, where until the beginning of September he underwent treatments for his multifarious medical complaints by an ophthalmologist, a neurologist, and a physician who treated his thyroid.

In 1908–9, at Wisła, Ochorowicz studied the mediumship of Stanisława Tomczyk.

In the latter half of the 19th century, Spiritualism was not an unusual subject of study for noted psychologists. A prominent American psychologist who looked favorably on Spiritualism was William James.

== Bibliography ==
- Jak należy badać duszę? Czyli o metodzie badań psychologicznych (How Should One Study the Soul? On the Method of Psychological Studies), 1869.
- Miłość, zbrodnia, wiara i moralność. Kilka studiów z psychologii kryminalnej (Love, Crime, Faith and Morality: Several Studies in the Psychology of Crime), 1870.
- Wstęp i pogląd ogólny na filozofię pozytywną (An Introduction to and Overview of Positive Philosophy), 1872.
- Z dziennika psychologa (From a Psychologist's Journal), 1876.
- O twórczości poetyckiej ze stanowiska psychologii (On Poetic Creativity from the Standpoint of Psychology), 1877.
- De la Suggestion mentale, deuxieme édition (second edition), Paris, Doin, 1889.
- Psychologia, pedagogika, etyka. Przyczynki do usiłowań naszego odrodzenia narodowego (Psychology, Pedagogy, Ethics: Contributions toward Our National Rebirth), 1917.

Translations:

- Ochorowicz, J., Mental suggestion, by Dr. J. Ochorowicz ... with a preface by Charles Richet, translated from the French by J. Fitzgerald, M.A., New York, Humboldt Publishing Co, 1891.
- J. Ochorowicz, Mental Dominance, New York, Instant Improvement, Inc., 1990. (From the page facing the title page: "This book, [first] published in French by Idégaf [in 1988], is a newly revised edition and was brought up to date by a group of psychologists.")

== See also ==
- History of philosophy in Poland
- List of Poles
- William Crookes (regarding notables who believed in Spiritualism).
