= Milbourne Christopher =

American illusionist, magic historian, and author (1914–1984)

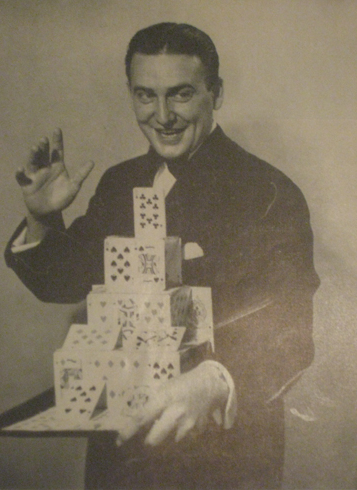
- Christopher in 1954
- Born: 23 March 1914; Baltimore, Maryland, U.S.
- Died: 17 June 1984 (aged 70); New York City, New York, U.S.
- Occupations: Magician, historian, and skeptic

Milbourne Christopher (23 March 1914 – 17 June 1984) was a prominent American illusionist, magic historian, and author.

President of the Society of American Magicians, an honorary vice-president to The Magic Circle, and one of the founding members of the Committee for Skeptical Inquiry, Christopher wrote a number of books, including a biography of Harry Houdini titled Houdini: The Untold Story, a chronicle of his own craft titled The Illustrated History Of Magic, and thousands of essays relating to magic and mentalism.

== Debunking work ==
Christopher regarded those individuals who claimed extrasensory perception or psychic powers to be actually using magic trickery. He wrote three book-length exposés regarding those he said were false seers or psychics: ESP, Seers & Psychics; Mediums, Mystics & The Occult; and Search For The Soul. In the latter book he found no evidence for the existence of the soul. Skeptical investigator Joe Nickell who was influenced by Christopher recommended the books "without reservation."

Christopher also debunked parapsychology experiments and experimenters during his lifetime. Ironically, despite his denial of the existence of psychic or paranormal powers, and like fellow magicians Harry Houdini and James Randi, both of whom also worked to expose false psychics and mediums, Christopher was accused by some of using paranormal powers to perform his own magic tricks and illusions.

== Posthumous achievements ==
In November 2010, Christopher's widow, Maurine Brooks Christopher, published a special edition of Houdini: A Pictorial Life with Christopher as collection curator.

At a meeting of the executive council of the Committee for Skeptical Inquiry (CSI) in Denver, Colorado in April 2011, Christopher was selected for inclusion in CSI's Pantheon of Skeptics. The Pantheon of Skeptics was created by CSI to remember the legacy of deceased fellows of CSI and their contributions to the cause of scientific skepticism.

In 2012, the book Milbourne Christopher: The Man & His Magic, was authored by William V. Rauscher.

The Milbourne Christopher Foundation was established to encourage excellence, originality and leadership in the magical arts and to help keep conjuring on a level with the other most popular entertainment forms – dance, drama, comedy and music. Incorporated in New York State in 1991, the foundation is federally approved as a charitable organization which was financially supported in the past, and so too will be in the future, through her contributions. The board members have changed through the years, as have several of the award judges. Both the officers and award judges donate their services to the foundation.

It was Mrs Christopher's wish, and the purpose of the foundation, to sponsor annual awards that spotlight the best magic has to offer contemporaneously in performing, writing, publishing and invention. The categories reflect Milbourne Christopher's diversified career. This includes the areas of:

- Author and/or publisher
- Outstanding illusionist and/or illusion creator
- Promising young magician
- Mentalist
- Lifetime achievement/master's award
- Ambassador of Magic

Winners in other areas may be added at the discretion of the judges, and not all winner categories are awarded each year. The charter also authorizes the use of the foundation's resources to collect classic books of magic – such as Christopher's Illustrated History of Magic, Panorama of Magic and his biographies of Houdini.

== Awards ==
- The Academy of Magical Arts Outstanding Contribution to Magic (1969)
- The Academy of Magical Arts Lecturer of the Year (1975)

== Publications ==
- Stretching A Rope. Kanter's Magic Shop. 1938.
- Christopher, Milbourne; Fetsch, Hen; Lorraine, Sid; Kaeber, Walt (1947). Magic at Your Finger Tips : Thirty-Three Tested Tricks. Baltimore: Maryland Magic Studio. OCLC 28606969.
- Christopher, Milbourne (1948). 50 Tricks with a Thumb Tip : A Manual of Thumb Tip Magic (3 ed.). New York: D. Robbins & Company. OCLC 920830105.
- Conjuring With Christopher. Holden's Magic Shop. 1949.
- The Greatest Magic Illusions Of All Time, article for Popular Mechanics magazine. 1958.
- Panorama Of Magic. New York: Dover. 1962. p. 216. ISBN 0486207749. LCCN 62-51376.
- Houdini: The Untold Story. New York: Crowell. 1969. p. 281. ISBN 9780690404319. OCLC 4255.
- ESP, Seers & Psychics: What The Occult Really Is. New York: Crowell. 1970. p. 268. ISBN 978-0690268157. OCLC 97063.
- The Illustrated History Of Magic. New York: Crowell. 1973. p. 452. ISBN 0435070169. OCLC 668533.
- Mediums, Mystics, & The Occult: New Revelations About Psychics And Their Secrets. New York: Crowell. 1975. p. 275. ISBN 0690004761. OCLC 1095102.
- Milbourne Christopher's Magic Book. New York: Crowell. 1977. p. 240. ISBN 0690016778. OCLC 3088945.
- Search For The Soul: An Insider's Report On The Continuing Quest By Psychics & Scientists For Evidence Of Life After Death. New York: Crowell. 1979. p. 206. ISBN 069001760X. OCLC 5241692.
