= Institut Suisse des Sciences Noétiques =

Swiss foundation

Institute suisse des sciences noétiques
- Abbreviation: ISSNOE — Noêsis
- Formation: 1999; 27 years ago
- Legal status: Non-profit organisation
- Purpose: Scientific investigations on ASC – NDE – ESP – OBE
- Location: Switzerland – Geneva
- Region served: Worldwide
- Members: Louis Nahum; Claudia Mazzocato; Claude Charles Fourrier
- President: Sylvie Dethiollaz, Sc.D.
- Main organ: ISSNOE Council
- Website: ISSNOE

The Institut Suisse des Sciences Noétiques (Swiss Institute of Noetic Sciences) or ISSNOE is an established public utility nonprofit foundation dedicated to the scientific and comparative study of consciousness. The institute's research focuses on altered states of consciousness (ASC), like near-death experiences (NDEs), extrasensory perceptions (ESPs), and out-of-body experiences (OBEs).

== History ==
The ISSNOE was created in 2012 from a merger between the Noêsis association and the Foundation Odier de Psycho-Physique (Odier Foundation of Psychophysics). The Noêsis association was formed by Sylvie Dethiollaz, a PhD student in molecular biology, in 1999. The Foundation Odier de Psycho-Physique by Marcel & Monique Odier in 1992, whose team included biologist Rémy Chauvin and physicist Olivier Costa de Beauregard.

== Work ==
In addition to the Institute's work investigating non-ordinary states of consciousness and near-death experiences, the Institute also focuses on attempting to better understand the fundamental nature of extrasensory perceptions and deciphering distinctive idiosyncrasies which can lead to out-of-body experiences. (Note: C8 2017) (Note: BTLV Media 2017) (Note: BTLV Media 2017)

The research results are summarized in two books, États Modifiés de Conscience (2011) and Voyage Aux Confins de la Conscience (2018).

=== Symposia ===
ISSNOE members welcome and frequently receive lectures and workshops from researchers, philosophers, physicists, psychologists, and prodromic doctors on their integrative approaches to mourning and the possible survival of the soul and consciousness that survives the death of the physical body. (Note: Beauregard & O’Leary 2008)

Lecturers include:

- D^{r} Piero Calvi-Parizetti, Professor of Emergencies and Humanitarian Action
- D^{r} Jean-Jacques Charbonier, Anaesthetist and intensive care physician
- Frederic Lenoir, (Note: Lenoir 2018, p. I-IV) (Note: Staune & UIP 2017, from timing 02:44 → watch online) (Note: Gilbert & Salem 2017, see video timing 18:18 to 18:47) Philosopher, sociologist and religion historian
- Stéphane Allix, former war reporter turned filmmaker and writer
- D^{r} Olivier Chambon, Psychiatrist and psychotherapist
- Jean-Pierre Postel, Anaesthetist and resuscitator
- Corine Sombrun, Ethnomusician
- Philippe Guillemant, Physicist
- Cyrille Javary, Sinologist
- Bernard Werber, Writer

== Media Appearances ==
The ISSNOE has participated in a range of television broadcasts, including a C8 interview between Dethiollaz and Thierry Ardisson on his weekly talk show, and appearances in programs about OBE on France 2 and France 3. The institute has also been featured in a number of radio broadcasts by Radio Télévision Suisse.

== Bibliography ==
- Joseph Banks Rhine (1964). Extra-sensory Perception. With a foreword by William McDougall and an introduction by Walter Franklin Prince. Duke University: Boston, B. Humphries. LCCN 34034415. First edition in 1934 → LCCN 34-34415. Reprinted in 1940 → LCCN 40-11662
- Robert J. Brumblay (June 2003). "Hyperdimensional Perspectives in Out-of-Body and Near-Death Experiences" (PDF). Journal of Near-Death Studies. 21 (4). Discontinued in July 2003. Honolulu, HI: Kluwer Academic Publishers-Plenum Publishers, Human Sciences Press, Inc.: 201–221. doi:10.1023/A:1024054029979. ISSN 1573-3661. S2CID 141168769. Abstract – Summary
- Jacques Neirynck (2009) [2006 à Lausanne aux éditions Favre]. "Altered States of Consciousness". Your Brain and Your Self [Tout savoir sur le cerveau et les dernières découvertes sur le Moi]. Vol. 70. Translated by Laurence Garey. Bibliographic references: pp. 113-115 and index. Berlin, Heidelberg: Springer Science+Business Media. pp. 79–83. doi:10.1007/978-3-540-87523-9_9. ISBN 978-3-540-87522-2. LCCN 2008935327. PMC 2537105. PMID 712866. "Sylvie Déthiollaz of the Noêsis Center in Geneva has conducted similar experiments using a subject who volunteered to attempt disembodiment, and a series of geometric images stored on a computer."
- Mario Beauregard; Denyse O'Leary (2008). Du cerveau à Dieu : plaidoyer d'un neuroscientifique pour l'existence de l'âme [The spiritual brain : a neuroscientist's case for the existence of the soul] (in French). Translated by Jocelin Morisson. Paris: éditions Trédaniel. ISBN 978-2-84445-903-9. OCLC 319949977. Première impression en 2008 en anglais chez Harper Perennial à Toronto OCLC 222516876, 437 p. EAN 9782844459039BnF 413106767, réimpression en 2015 OCLC 927598356
- Journal of Near-Death Studies
- Journal of Scientific Exploration
- Journal of Abnormal Psychology
- Journal of Consciousness Studies
- Irreducible Mind: Toward a Psychology for the 21st Century
- Life After Life: The Investigation of a Phenomenon—Survival of Bodily Death

== Notes and references ==
=== Works cited ===
- Thierry Ardisson (2017). "Sortir de son corps, un phénomène objectivable (OBE)" [Getting out of one's own body, an objectifiable phenomenon (OBE)] (video). Salut les terriens ! (in French). C8, Canal+ Group. "Entretien avec Nicolas Fraisse et Sylvie Dethiollaz"
- Comment la scientifique Sylvie Déthiollaz analyse les sorties de corps de Nicolas Fraisse (video) (in French). BTLV Media. 27 June 2017. "Nicolas Fraisse, Sylvie Déthiollaz, et Claude-Charles Fourrier témoignent sur BTLV"
- "Retour sur dix années de recherche sur les sorties hors du corps : hallucination ou réalité ?" (video). Colloque international sur la conscience et l'invisible ["A look back at ten years of research on out-of-body experiences (OBE): hallucination or reality?" International Symposium on Consciousness and the Invisible] (in French). Maison de la Mutualité: UIP : université interdisciplinaire de Paris. 4 February 2017. "Présentation de Jean Staune; intervenants : Frédéric Lenoir, Sylvie Déthiollaz, Nicolas Fraisse, Claude Charles Fourrier"
- Sylvie Dethiollaz; Claude Charles Fourrier (2018) [2016]. Voyage aux confins de la conscience : dix années d'exploration scientifique des sorties hors du corps. Le cas Nicolas Fraisse [A journey to the limits of consciousness: ten years of scientific exploration of out-of-body experiences. The Nicolas Fraisse case] (in French). avec la collaboration de Julie Klotz, Preface by Frédéric Lenoir. Paris: éditions Trédaniel & France Loisirs. ISBN 978-2-298-14359-1. OCLC 1078372759.

== See also ==
=== Related institutions ===
- The Monroe Institute — TMI
- Rhine Research Center — RRC
- Ghost Research Society — GRS
- Fairy Investigation Society — FIS
- College of Psychic Studies — CPS
- Parapsychology Foundation — PF
- Parapsychological Association — PA
- Society for Psychical Research — SPR
- Institut Métapsychique International — IMI
- Université interdisciplinaire de Paris — UIP
- American Society for Psychical Research — ASPR
- American Psychical Institute and Laboratory — APIL
- International Association for Near-Death Studies — IANDS
- London Dialectical Society — LDS
- Stanford Research Institute — SRI
- London Spiritualist Alliance — LSA
- West Midlands Ghost Club — WMGC
- Oxford Phasmatological Society — OPS
- Boston Society for Psychical Research — BSPR
- Association for Transpersonal Psychology — ATP
- International Club for Psychical Research — ICPS
- British National Association of Spiritualists — BNAS
- National Laboratory of Psychical Research — NLPS
- Society for the Study of Supernormal Pictures — SSSP
- Institut de recherche sur les expériences extraordinaires — INREES
- Association for the Scientific Study of Anomalous Phenomena — ASSAP
