= Charles Drayton Thomas =

British Methodist minister and spiritualist

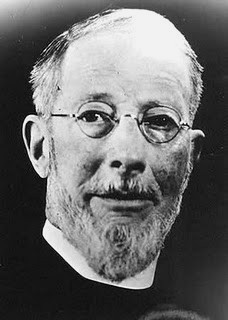
- Born: 1867
- Died: 1953 (aged 85–86)
- Occupation(s): Minister, spiritualist

Charles Drayton Thomas (1867 - 1953) also known as C. Drayton Thomas was a British Methodist minister and spiritualist.

== Career ==
Thomas graduated from Richmond Theological College and was a minister at Wesleyan Methodist Church. He was a member of the Society for Psychical Research (SPR) and a convinced spiritualist.

His father John Wesley Thomas, also a minister had died in 1903. In 1917, he attended séances with the medium Gladys Osborne Leonard. He carried many experiments with the medium and became convinced she had communicated with the spirit of his father. Thomas became known for his involvement in the Bobby Newlove case, a famous proxy séance sitting with Leonard.

Thomas defended the direct-voice medium Leslie Flint, despite the fact that other members from the SPR suggested he was fraudulent. He also defended the fraudulent spirit photographer William Hope from charges of fraud from Harry Price. Thomas received criticism from psychical researchers for this and his statements about the Hope-Price case were rebutted by the SPR in 1924.

== Publications ==
Books

- Some New Evidence For Human Survival (1922)
- Life Beyond Death With Evidence (1930)
- The Mental Phenomena of Spiritualism (1930)
- An Amazing Experiment (1936)
- Precognition and Human Survival: A New Type of Evidence (1949)

Papers

- Thomas, Charles Drayton. (1924). Concerning the Price-Hope Case. Journal of the Society for Psychical Research 21: 190–200. (Drayton's statement and rebuttal from the SPR)
- Thomas, Charles Drayton. (1928). The Modus Operandi of Trance Communication According to Descriptions Received Through Mrs Osborne Leonard. Proceedings of the Society for Psychical Research 38: 49–100.
- Thomas, Charles Drayton. (1935). A Proxy Case Extending Over Eleven Sittings With Mrs. Osborne Leonard. Proceedings of the Society for Psychical Research 43: 439–519.
- Thomas, Charles Drayton. (1946–1949). The Volume of Byron: A Significant Book-Test. Proceedings of the Society for Psychical Research 48: 230–237.
- Thomas, Charles Drayton. (1946–1949). A New Hypothesis Concerning Trance-Communications. Proceedings of the Society for Psychical Research 48: 121–163.

== See also ==
- Stanley De Brath
- Charles Lakeman Tweedale
