= Pascal Forthuny =

French art critic and mystic (1872–1962)

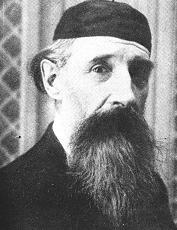
- Born: 24 March 1872; Paris
- Died: 29 April 1962 (aged 90)
- Occupations: Art critic, clairvoyant

Pascal Forthuny (24 March 1872 - 29 April 1962) was a French art critic, clairvoyant medium and novelist.

== Biography ==
Forthuny was born as Georges Léopold Cochet in Paris in 1872. He developed his alleged paranormal abilities of automatic writing, clairvoyance and psychometry in the 1920s after his son died in a plane crash. He was tested by psychical researchers such as Eugéne Osty and Charles Richet who were convinced he had genuine paranormal powers.

Other researchers were more skeptical. Samuel Soal wrote that Forthuny's work was "not always above suspicion." During an anonymous sitting in 1929, Forthuny had pretended to obtain his name by automatic writing but it was discovered that he previously attended lunch with psychical researchers Eleanor Sidgwick and V. J. Woolley who told him the afternoon sitter was Soal.

In 1930, an article in the French magazine Psychica accused Forthuny of fraud. During one of his alleged clairvoyant demonstrations he was said to have obtained signals from an accomplice who gave him information about his target.

== Chair tests ==
Forthuny was known for carrying out "empty chair" tests in parapsychology. This type of experiment was originally devised by Eugéne Osty at the Institut Métapsychique International and conducted with Forthuny in April 1926. Forthuny was shown a marked empty chair in the conference room. He then gave predictions to a stenographer about the unknown person who would occupy the chair such as their appearance or characteristics. Later during the same day the room would be filled with people and the marked chair would be occupied. According to Osty the experiments were a success and evidence for precognition. Criticism of the chair tests came from Antônio da Silva Mello who found the results suspicious as they were never replicated. The controls of the tests were also criticized and they are now considered discredited.

== Publications ==
- Notes et impressions de voyage: En Suisse (ill. P. Forthuny), Paris, La Semaine des constructeurs, 1898
- Le Roi régicide: Roman social, Paris, Tallandier, 1898
- La voie idéale: Les étapes inquiètes, Paris, Fasquelle, 1899
- Une crise, Paris, Paul Ollendorf, 1901
- L'Altesse, Paris, Tallandier, 1904
- Amours d'Allemagne: Frieda, Paris, Pierre Douville, 1907
- Les vierges solitaires: Roman social, Pierre Douville, 1909
- Isabel ou le poignard d'argent: La tragédie des deux Espagne, Paris, Sansot & Cie, 1911
- Au seuil de l’âme chinoise !: Essai pour une psychologie de l'apprenti sinologue, Paris, P. Dupont, 1915
- Le vendeur d'huile et la reine de beauté : Maisons closes chinoise, Paris, Albin Michel, 1918
- Le miracle des pruniers en fleurs: Roman chinois, Paris, Albin Michel, 1920
- Une victoire de la photographie psychique: la romanesque et glorieuse aventure du medium William Hope (de Crew, Angleterre) accusé d'être un imposteur, traîné une année dans la boue, victime d'une sombre machination, enfin reconnu parfaitement innocent et incontestable medium photographe, Terrier frères et Cie, 1923
- Les amants chinois, Paris, Albin Michel, 1924
- Entretiens avec une outre : Devant la mort de Sarda Nafale et l'entrée des Croisés à Constantinople, Paris, G. Daugon imp, 1929
- Je lis dans les destinées : La clairvoyance et ses médiums, Les éditions de France, 1937
