= David Duguid =

David Duguid may refer to:

- David Duguid (medium) (1832–1907), Scottish spiritualist medium and cabinet-maker
- David Duguid (politician) (born 1970), Scottish politician
