= Laura Larson =

American photographer (born 1965)

- Born: 1965 (age 60–61); Pittsburgh, Pennsylvania
- Education: Oberlin College, Rutgers, State University of New Jersey, Whitney Museum of American Art
- Known for: photography
- Notable work: Large Orb (2005), Emma (2008) Ryan (2008), Boston #205 (2000)
- Movement: Contemporary art
- Website: www.lauralarson.net

Laura Larson (born 1965) is an American photographer.

== Life ==
Larson earned her BA in English from Oberlin College, her MFA in visual arts at Rutgers, State University of New Jersey and participated in the Whitney Museum of American Art Independent Study Program. She is on the faculty of Bard MFA, Milton Avery Graduate School of the Arts.

== Art career ==
Larson identifies herself as a photographer, although her work includes film, video, digital media, and writing.

Larson's work challenges the notion of the medium that "never lies." In her "Domestic Interiors" and "My Dark Places" series, she photographs dollhouse interiors, playing with the viewer's perception of scale.

Larson's “Well-Appointed” series depicts the interior of historical homes, focusing on the lavish furniture and raising questions about wealth and power. Her series “Complementary” captured traces of occupancy in hotel rooms after checkout and before maid service. Larson used the interrelationship of First and Second Wave Feminism as a jumping off point for these four bodies of work, which center around mise en scene, and how the rooms themselves tell a story.

Two related series “Apparition” and “Asylum” focus on the paranormal. Larson created her own spirit photographs, using cigarette smoke to reference the staged spirit photographs of the 19th century.

Larson's focus shifted to the representation of the body with her series "Ectoplasm," referencing the both humorous and moving 19th century photographs of female mediums.

In her video Electric Girls and the Invisible World, she follows a group of five teenage girlfriends and their mysterious connection to the 19th century medium Eusapia Palladino, presenting reflections on female adolescence, melancholy, and longing. Electric Girls was supported by a post-production residency for film at the Wexner Center for the Arts.

Her book Hidden Mother (2017) uses portraits of children with "hidden mothers," the term for the practice of concealing a mother's body as she supported her child during the long exposures demanded by early photographic technology, to present her personal experience of motherhood. As part of this project, Larson curated a traveling exhibition of 19th century tintypes featuring portraits of children with "hidden mothers."

Larson published her second book City of Incurable Women (2022).

Larson was awarded a John Simon Guggenheim Memorial Foundation Fellowship in Photography in 2023.

== Book ==
- Larson, Laura (2017). Hidden Mother. Saint Lucy Books. ISBN 978-0-692-79927-7.
- Larson, Laura (2022). City of Incurable Women. Saint Lucy Books. ISBN 978-0-578-96398-3.

== Public collections ==
Larson's work is held in the following public collections:

- Metropolitan Museum of Art, New York City
- Museum of Fine Arts, Houston
