= Stanley De Brath =

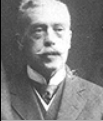
- Born: 10 October 1854
- Died: 20 December 1937 (aged 83)
- Occupation(s): Civil engineer, spiritualist

Stanley De Brath (10 October 1854 – 20 December 1937) was a British civil engineer, psychical researcher and spiritualist.

== Career ==
Brath was born in Sydenham, Kent. He worked as a civil engineer in India for 17 years. He was most well known for his book Psychic Philosophy as the Foundation of a Religion of Natural Law, published in 1896. Alfred Russel Wallace had written an introduction for the book and considered it of "great lucidity, a philosophy of the universe and of human nature in its threefold aspect of body, soul, and spirit". The book was expanded in 1908 and endorsed by Wallace in a prefatory note.

Brath was a Christian and believed that both Christianity and spiritualism were compatible.

Brath also translated a number of psychical research books into English. He translated Charles Richet's Thirty Years of Psychical Research (1923).

He was the editor of Psychic Science a journal published by the British College of Psychic Science.

His books were criticized by the scientific community. The sociologist Guy Benton Johnson ridiculed Psychical Research, Science, and Religion in a review as an anti-scientific work and only "grand-reading if you have a sense of humor."

== Publications ==
- The Foundations of Success: A Plea for Rational Education (1896)
- Psychic Philosophy as the Foundation of a Religion of Natural Law (1896, 1908) [under the pseudonym V. C. Desertis]
- Mysteries of Life: A Book for Boys and Girls (1916)
- Psychical Research, Science and Religion (1925)
- The Drama of Europe, Or, The Soul of History (1930)
- The Physical Phenomena of Spiritualism (1930)

Translations

- Gustav Geley. From the Unconscious to the Conscious (1920).
- Gustav Geley. Clairvoyance and Materialisation: A Record of Experiments (1927)
- Charles Richet. Thirty Years of Psychical Research (1923)
- Ernesto Bozzano. Animism and Spiritism: A Reply to M. Sudre's Introduction à la Métapsychique Humaine (1932)

== See also ==
- Charles Lakeman Tweedale
