= Saint-Mard-de-Réno =

- Commune
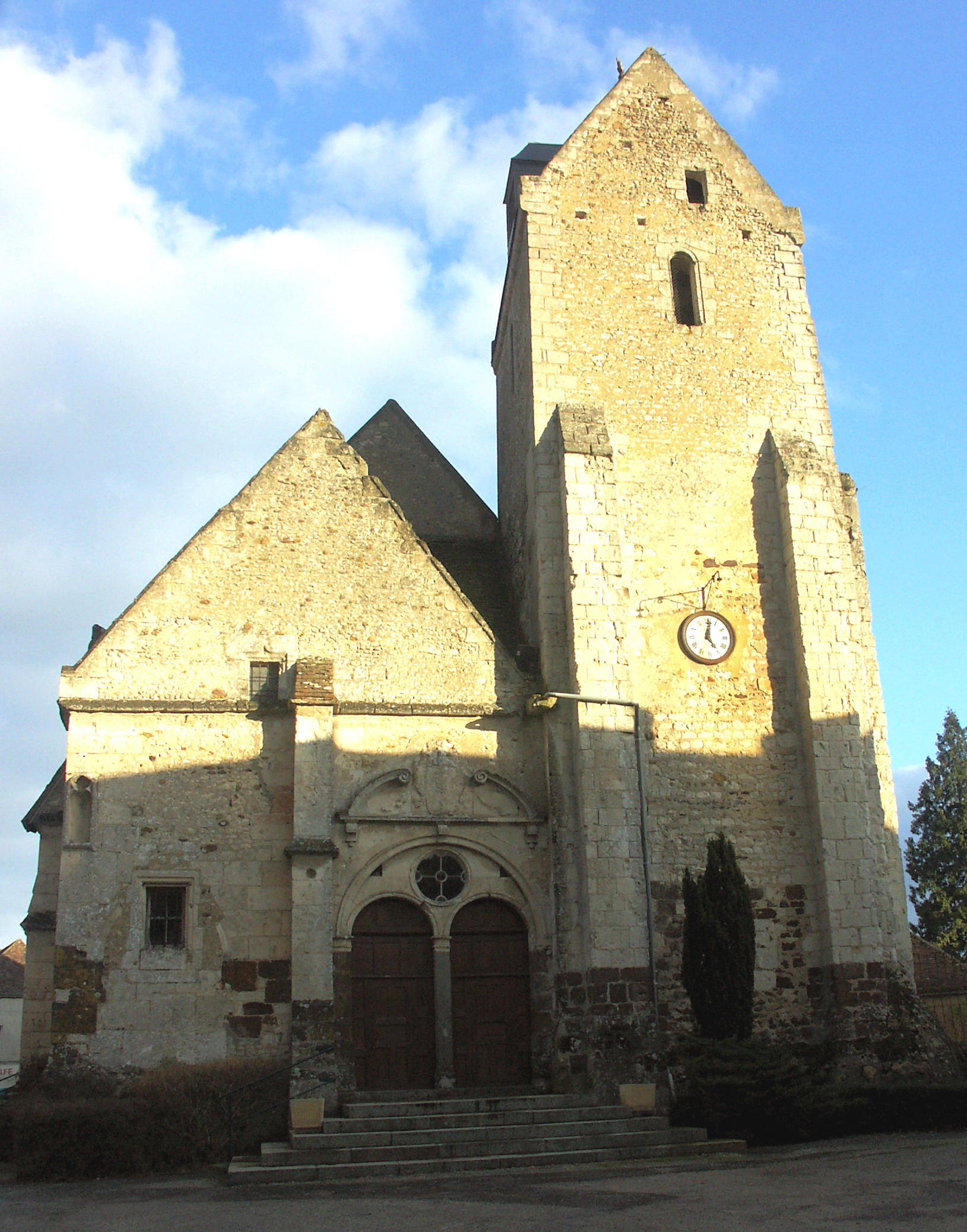
- The church in Saint-Mard-de-Réno

- Coat of arms
- Location of Saint-Mard-de-Réno
- Location within France Location within Normandy
- Coordinates: 48°30′38″N 0°38′04″E
- Country: France
- Region: Normandy
- Department: Orne
- Arrondissement: Mortagne-au-Perche
- Canton: Mortagne-au-Perche

Government
  - Mayor (2020–2026): Anne-Marie Guérin
- Area^{1}: 19.13 km^{2} (7.39 sq mi)
- Elevation: 236 m (774 ft)
- Highest elevation: 242 m (794 ft)
- Lowest elevation: 157 m (515 ft)
- Population (2023): 386
  - Density: 20.2/km^{2} (52.3/sq mi)
- Time zone: UTC+01:00 (CET)
  - Summer (DST): UTC+02:00 (CEST)
- INSEE/Postal code: 61418 /61400
- ^{1} French Land Register data, which excludes lakes, ponds, glaciers > 1 km^{2} (0.386 sq mi or 247 acres) and river estuaries.

Saint-Mard-de-Réno (French pronunciation: [sɛ̃ maʁ də ʁeno]) is a commune in the Orne department in north-western France.

== Geography ==
The Commune along with another 70 communes shares part of a 47,681 hectare, Natura 2000 conservation area, called the Forêts et étangs du Perche.

La Vilette river flows through the commune.

== Points of interest ==
=== National heritage sites ===
- Saint-Médard parish church is a twelfth century church, that was registered as a Monument historique in 1998.

== Notable people ==
- Édouard Isidore Buguet - (1840–1901) was a medium and spirit photographer, who was born here.

== See also ==
- Communes of the Orne department
