= Society for the Study of Supernormal Pictures =

Short-lived psychical organization

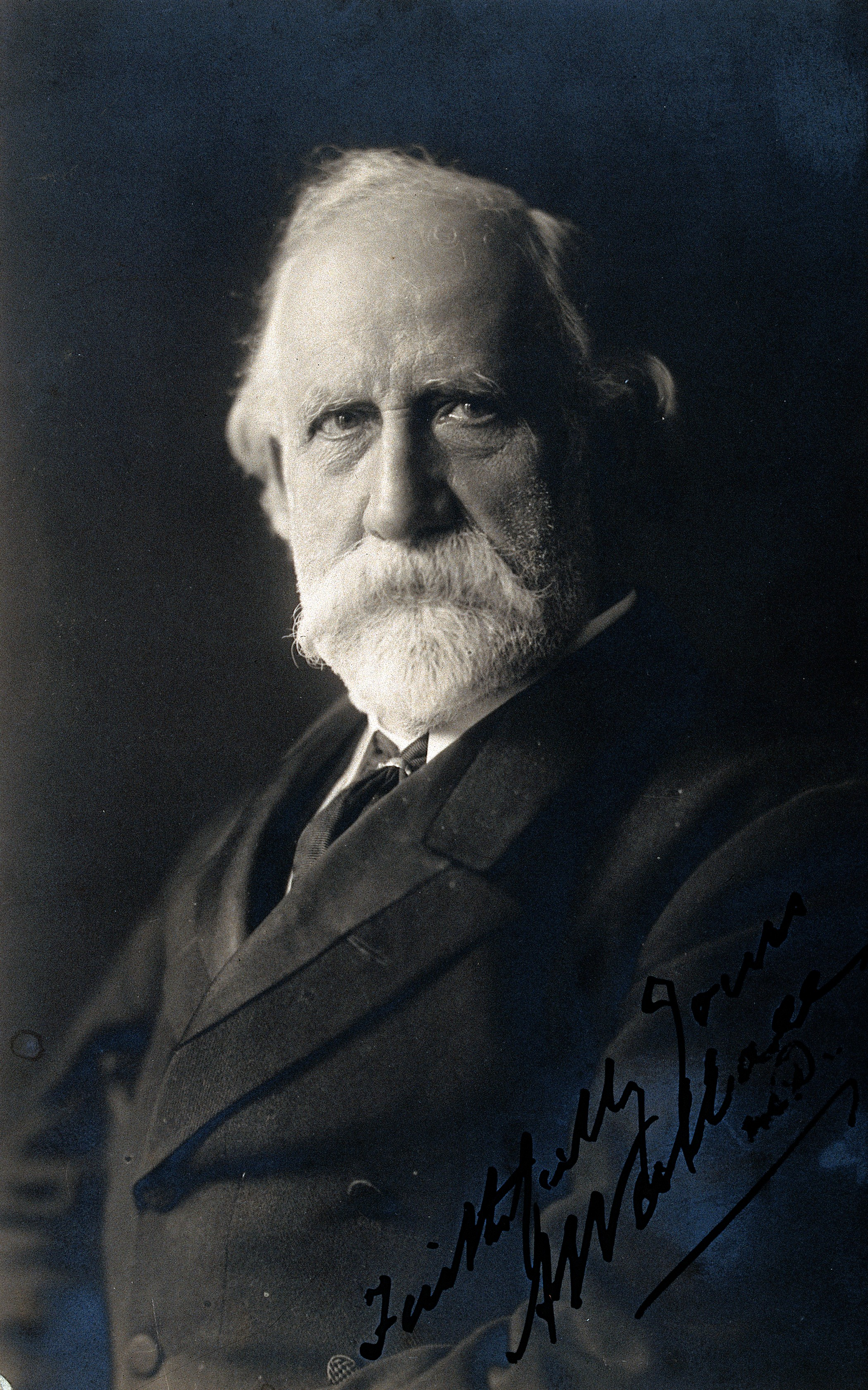
Abraham Wallace. Credit: Wellcome Library

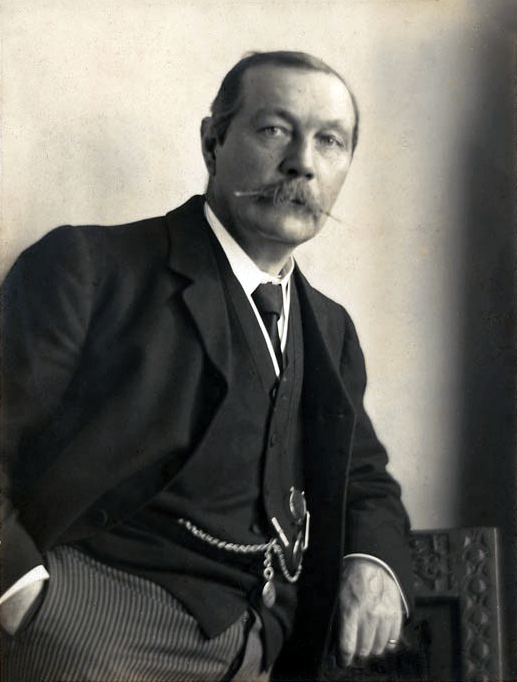
Arthur Conan Doyle was a notable member of the SSSP.

The Society for the Study of Supernormal Pictures (SSSP) was a short-lived psychical organization that formed in 1918 to investigate claims of spirit photography. It was established as a rival to the Society for Psychical Research.

== History ==
The first President of the SSSP was physician Abraham Wallace. Henry Blackwell, Arthur Conan Doyle and W. G. Mitchell were Vice-Presidents.

According to photographer Martyn Jolly, "The SPR successfully exposed as frauds several spirit photographers supported by the SSSP." One of these was the photographer William Hope.

Members of the SSSP such as Arthur Conan Doyle and honorary secretary Fred Barlow stated that the photographs of the Cottingley Fairies were genuine. In May, 1920 the organization reported that they had obtained evidence for paranormally produced photographs under test conditions. This opinion was rejected by other psychical researchers and in 1923 the organization dissolved.

Barlow was originally supportive of spirit photography but later reversed his opinion. In 1933 he co-authored a paper in the Proceedings of the Society for Psychical Research that cast doubt on the subject and demonstrated fraudulent methods that William Hope and other photographers had utilized.

Barlow's collection of spirit photographs was given to Eric Dingwall who annotated them for the British Library. In 1960, he commented that the collection was evidence of "human stupidity, credulity and superstition".

== See also ==
- Abstract photography
- Spirit photography
