= Olivier Costa de Beauregard =

Olivier Costa de Beauregard (6 November 1911 - 5 February 2007) was a French engineer, physicist and philosopher. He spent much of his career studying quantum physics and relativity. From the early 1950s, he also wrote extensively about his belief in parapsychology.

== Biography ==
He was born in Paris, the first of two boys to Geneviève (née Imbert de Balorre, a Bourbon family) and Bérold Costa de Beauregard, part of the wealthy, established Costa de Beauregard family which originated from Savoie. His younger brother was Roland Costa de Beauregard (5 August 1913 - 11 November 2002), who became a notable leader of the French Resistance and later a French Army general. Olivier Costa de Beauregard received a home education from his father, nurses, clergy and others before attending Sainte-Croix de Neuilly school. His father died when he was fifteen. He gained a place at university but took sabbaticals for sport and reading first. He gained his degree in Physics in 1938 and did national service as an artillery lieutenant.

In 1938, he became a research engineer at Société nationale de constructions aéronautiques du Sud-Est (SNCASE) [National Society for Aeronautical Construction of the South-East]. At the onset of World War II, he was mobilised in his national service rank. After the Franco-German armistice in June 1940, he joined the theoretical physics department of the Institut Henri Poincaré, part of the Centre national de la recherche scientifique (CNRS) [National Centre of Scientific Research]. He completed his PhD in 1943, his thesis entitled Contribution à l'étude de la théorie de l'électron de Dirac [Contribution to the study of Dirac's electron theory]. Louis de Broglie was his thesis advisor; he was part of de Broglie's team working on relativity and quantum mechanics.

From 1947, he proposed to de Broglie his interpretation of the EPR paradox, questioning the interpretation of time, a central theme of his career. In 1950, he married Nicole de Peyronnet, his life partner. He joined the Institute for Advanced Studies in 1951 where he became acquainted with Albert Einstein. During the 1950s, his and de Broglie's different approaches to physics meant that they parted ways. He became director of research at CNRS in 1971 and remained so until he retired in 1980. He published a number of articles continuing his interest in Dirac's work on the electron, the De Broglie–Bohm theory, relativity and quantum physics, inertial spin and the Imbert–Fedorov effect following work by his colleague fr:Christian Imbert at L'Institute d'Optique.

=== Parapsychology and retrocausality ===
Costa de Beauregard retained a deep faith in the Roman Catholicism of his upbringing. He referred to "paranormal abilities" of St. Don Bosco, St. John of the Cross, St. Teresa of Ávila and other mystics from history. He believed in the concept of mind over matter. In the same vein, he wrote frequently on the ramifications of the EPR paradox, a thought experiment which the authors tried to demonstrate that the quantum-mechanical description of Nature was incomplete, that unknown localised "hidden variables" had an effect. Further thought experiments by others including David Bohm and especially John Bell led to contradictory results from laboratory experiments. Alain Aspect, a young French researcher, sought a topic to gain his doctorat d'état. He visited Christian Imbert at the Institut d'Optique, who discussed it with Costa de Beauregard and Bernard d'Espagnat, before giving Aspect a bibliography related to Bell's inequalities. Between 1981 and 1982, Aspect demonstrated convincingly that quantum mechanics violates Bell's inequalities, a validation of the theory indicating that if hidden variables do exist then they are non-local.

Costa de Beauregard interpreted the result as further supporting his belief, that particles in superposition were travelling in different directions in time, two different events connected in the past so that retrogade causality is a solution. He stated that if all physical laws are symmetrical in time then its perceived "arrow", with an increase in disorder associated with the second law of thermodynamics, was as a result of specific inter-related conditions for all observed results. He extrapolated this to justify phenomena such as precognition, telepathy, psychokinesis and teleportation, all of which he had previously been opposed to. He became a member of the Fondation Marcel et Monique Odier de Psycho-Physique which merged with the Institut suisse des sciences noétiques. He speculated on other phenomena such as a biological effect at the sub-atomic level - originally proposed by Corentin Kervran - concerning birds nesting on granite obtaining calcium for egg shells from the transmutation of potassium in mica into calcium through the weak interaction [Kervran was posthumously awarded an Ig Nobel for the paper].

The colliquium of Cordoba, which Costa de Beauregard attended in 1979, resulted in lively exchanges with French scientific colleagues. The same year, physicist John Wheeler, irritated at parapsychologists referencing his research papers, called parapsychology "a pretentious pseudo science" and "nonsense" but failed to get the American Association for the Advancement of Science to end their affiliation with the Parapsychological Association. Fedor Fedorov, discoverer of the effect Costa de Beauregard had written articles on, had similar views to Wheeler about parapsychology. Costa de Beauregard responded to Wheeler in a letter to The New York Review of Books which included three other physicists including Nobel Prize-winner Brian Josephson as a co-signatories. In it, he mentioned John Hasted's claim about children bending and stretching metal remotely, the French magician Jean Pierre Girard's 'hardening' of aluminium bars through mind control, the remote biasing of random number generators and remote viewing. In a follow-up reply, each example was dismissed by philosopher and science writer Martin Gardner, who described the physicists' faith in Girard as a 'French medium' as "almost beyond belief". Costa de Beauregard's close friend Georges Lochak wrote after his death that he was not intimidated by his detractors nor scared of the loneliness and blacklisting.

He died in February 2007, having survived a cerebral embolism and two weeks after announcing he was considering giving up studying Physics.

== Published books ==
=== English ===
- Précis of special relativity, translated by Banesh Hoffmann, Academic Press, 1966
- Time, the physical magnitude, Reidel Publishing Cy, 1987

=== French ===
- La Théorie de la relativité restreinte, pref. by Louis de Broglie, Masson, 1949.
- Théorie synthétique de la relativité restreinte et des quanta, Gauthier-Villars, 1957.
- La Notion de temps, équivalence avec l'espace, Hermann, 1963, Librairie philosophique Vrin, 2e édition 1983.
- Le Second Principe de la science du temps, entropie, information, irréversibilité, éd. du Seuil, 1963.
- Précis de relativité restreinte, éd. Dunod, 1964
- Précis de mécanique quantique relativiste, ed. Dunod, 1967
- La Physique moderne et les pouvoirs de l'esprit, éd. Le Hameau, 1980, rééd. 1988
- Le Temps déployé, passé, futur, ailleurs, éditions du Rocher, 1988.
- Le Corps subtil du réel éclaté, Aubin éditeur, 1995
- Le Temps des physiciens : "La Notion de temps" et "Le Second principe de la science du temps", Rééd., Aubin, 1996
- Preuves en biologie de transmutations à faible énergie, NOTE FINALE (Physique Théorique), Maloine, Paris, 1975, p 285-298
