= Ernesto Bozzano =

Italian parapsychologist and spiritualist

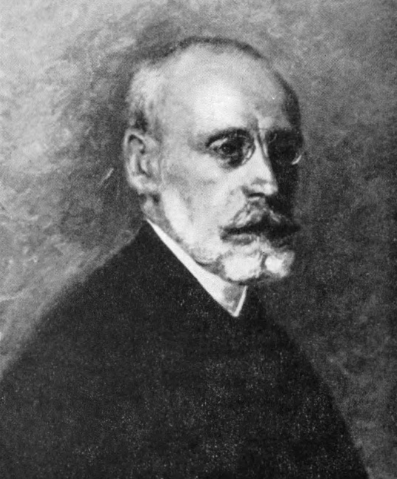
- Born: January 9, 1862; Genoa
- Died: June 24, 1943 (aged 81)
- Occupations: Parapsychologist, writer

Ernesto Bozzano (January 9, 1862 – June 24, 1943), also known as Signor Bozzano, was an Italian parapsychologist and spiritualist.

== Career ==
Bozzano was born in Genoa. He did not receive formal education, he was self-taught. He was influenced by the philosophical ideas of Herbert Spencer and took interest in psychical research. He wrote more than 60 books and 200 papers on psychical matters. He became known as a popular sympathizer of spiritism in Italy. He attributed most paranormal phenomena to the survival of the human soul.

Bozzano contributed articles and a preface to Gwendolyn Kelley Hack's Modern Psychic Mysteries, 1929. The book documented séances that Bozzano attended with the medium Marquis Carlo Centurione Scotto during 1927-1928 at Millesimo Castle. He was convinced from the Millesimo sittings that there was genuine spiritualist phenomena. His book Polyglot Mediumship (1932) recorded 35 alleged cases of xenoglossy. He was an early researcher on deathbed phenomena.

Bozzano defended the medium William Stainton Moses from allegations of fraud by Frank Podmore in a paper A Defence of the Memory of William Stainton Moses (The Annals of Psychical Science, 1905).

== Reception ==
Bozzano drew criticism from psychical researchers for being a credulous investigator. In a review of Hack's Psychic Mysteries, investigating officer Theodore Besterman from the Society for Psychical Research wrote that "Bozzano's claims are wholly unfounded, and that the Millesimo sittings have not the slightest vestige of scientific value."

Hans Driesch wrote that Bozzano was an acute theoriser but "unfortunately far too slipshod in accepting alleged facts."

An anonymous review in Nature described Bozzano as "one of the most prolific of Italian writers on psychical research." The reviewer suggested his book Dicarnate Influence in Human Life would not be taken seriously by skeptics but will "certainly be discussed at length by psychical researchers generally."

C. E. M. Joad suggested in a review for Dicarnate Influence in Human Life that Bozzano had been carried away by his "speculative imagination."

== Selected publications ==
- Ipotesi Spiritica e Teorie Scientifiche (1903)
- A Defence of the Memory of William Stainton Moses (The Annals of Psychical Science, Vol 1. 1905)
- Animals and Psychic Perceptions (The Annals of Psychical Science, Vol 2. 1905)
- Apparitions of Deceased Persons at Death-Beds (The Annals of Psychical Science, Vol 3. 1906)
- Symbolism and Metaphysical Phenomena. (The Annals of Psychical Science, Vol 6. 1907)
- Per la Difesa dello Spiritismo (1927)
- Gwendolyn Kelley Hack. Modern Psychic Mysteries: Millesimo Castle (London: Rider and Company, preface by Ernesto Bozzano, 1929)
- Animism and Spiritism: A Reply to M. Sudre's Introduction à la Métapsychiquer Humaine. (London: Arthur H. Stockwell, translated by Stanley De Brath, 1932)
- Polyglot Mediumship (Xenoglossy) (London: Rider and Company, translated by Isabel Emerson, 1932)
- Dei Fenomeni di Infestazione (1936)
- Les Phénomènes de Bilocation (1937)
- Discarnate Influence in Human Life: A Review of the Case for Spirit Intervention (London: International Institute for Psychical Research, translated by Isabel Emerson, 1938)
- Popoli Primitivi e Manifestazioni Supernormali (1941)
- Dei Fenomeni di Telestesia (1942)
- Musica Trascendentale (1943)
- Le Visioni dei Morenti (1947)
- Luci nel Futuro (two volumes, 1947)
- La Psiche Domina la Materia (1948)
- La Crisi della Morte nelle Descrizioni dei Defunti Comunicanti (1952)
