= Édouard Isidore Buguet =

French medium (1840–1901)

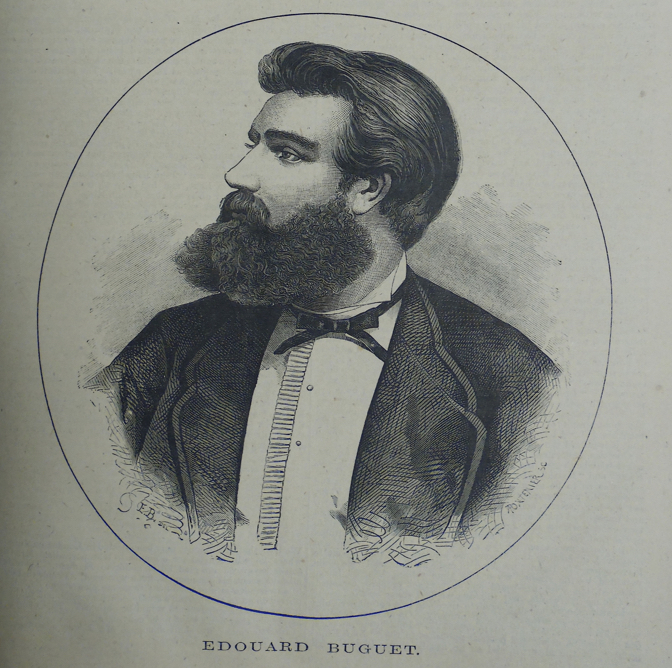
- Edouard Buguet
- Born: Édouard Isidore Buguet; July 13, 1840; Saint-Mard-de-Réno
- Died: October 29, 1890 (aged 50); 10th arrondissement of Paris
- Citizenship: French
- Occupation: Photograoher
- Known for: Mediumship and Spirit photography

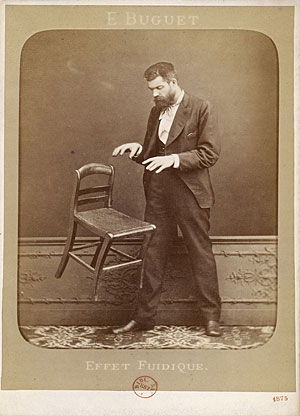
Spirit photography hoaxer Édouard Isidore Buguet (1840–1901) of France fakes telekinesis in this 1875 cabinet card photograph titled Fluidic Effect.

Édouard Isidore Buguet (French pronunciation: [edwaʁ izidɔʁ byɡɛ]; 1840–1901) was a French medium and spirit photographer.

Buguet became a "sensation" among spiritualists during the early 1870s. He was even loaned money to set up his own studio. In June 1875, a police sting operation in Paris discovered that Buguet's photographic plates had pre-exposed images on them. After the exposure, Buguet admitted in court that his photographs were fraudulent. He was convicted and served a year jail time. According to the magician Harry Houdini, the police discovered figures and doll heads at Buguet's studio. He had used these as his "spirit" extras. Houdini noted that although Buguet was exposed as a fraud and he had confessed, some spiritualists still insisted his spirit photographs were genuine.

The English medium Stainton Moses had supported Buguet in an article for Human Nature in May 1875. After Buguet was exposed later in the same year, Moses insisted that Buguet was still a genuine medium and he had been bribed to make a false confession. The case has been cited by researchers as an example of spiritualists willing to believe and refusing to accept evidence of fraud.
