= Richard Boursnell =

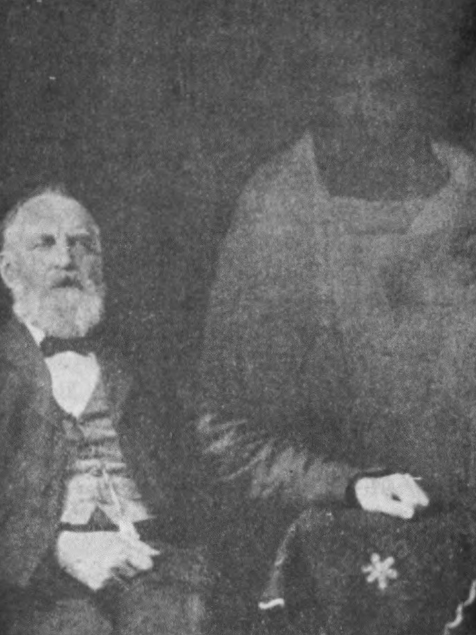
Spirit photograph of William Thomas Stead with Piet Botha.

Richard Boursnell (1832–1909) was a British medium and spirit photographer.

Boursnell worked in a partnership with a professional photographer in Fleet Street, London. According to the psychical researcher Simeon Edmunds, the spirit photographs of Boursnell "proved fraudulent on a number of occasions."

In 1902, Boursnell took a photograph of the spiritualist William Thomas Stead and a "spirit" extra appeared which was identified as Piet Botha, a Boer commandant killed in the South African War. Stead claimed Botha was unknown in England and stated that the photograph was of supernatural origin, however, magician John Nevil Maskelyne and Andrew Wilson discovered that Botha's death had been reported in London newspapers in 1899 with a photograph of Botha.

Boursnell was exposed when F. C. Barnes from Brisbane, Australia visited him in London in 1908. The "spirit" extra from the photograph was identified as Empress Elisabeth of Austria, taken from a book.

Researcher Ronald Pearsall wrote that another fraudulent method used by Boursnell was painting a spirit on a background with a "substance such as quinine sulphite".
