= David Duguid (medium) =

Scottish spiritualist medium

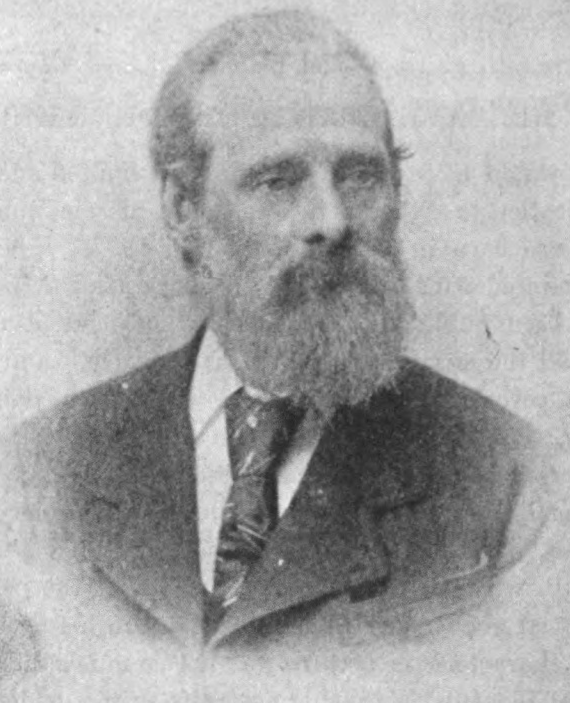
David Duguid

David Duguid (February 10, 1832 – March 14, 1907) was a Scottish spiritualist medium and Glasgow cabinet-maker by trade.

== Career ==
Duguid was born in Dunfermline. He worked as a cabinet-maker as a young man. He began his interest in spiritualism in 1866 by attending table-turning experiments. He later took up mediumship and spirit photography. He was also known for his automatic drawings and paintings, which impressed the psychical researcher Edward Trusted Bennett. However, in 1878, Frank Podmore attended a séance of Duguid and strongly suspected that he had cheated by using a card that had already been painted.

In 1892, Duguid was tested in Glasgow and London by John Traill Taylor, editor of the British Journal of Photography. Extra figures appeared on the camera plates. Taylor noted that the figures were "vile" looking but offered no explanation for their origin. His spirit photography was exposed when it was revealed he had used paper with chemically bleached-out images on them, and during his séances would secretly press the paper against a blotter dampened with a developing solution. Harry Price wrote that Duguid "was caught cheating over and over again. One of his 'extras', a 'Cyprian priestess', was found to be a facsimile of a German picture."

In 1905, Duguid was exposed in Manchester when he was searched and small oil paintings were found in his trousers.

== Publications ==
- Hafed, Prince of Persia: His Experiences in Earth-Life and Spirit-Life (1876) [with Hay Nisbet]
- Hermes, a Disciple of Jesus: His Life and Missionary Work (1888)

== See also ==
- Richard Boursnell
- Frederick Hudson
