= René Warcollier =

French chemical engineer and parapsychologist

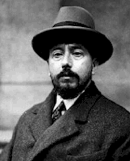
- Born: 8 April 1881
- Died: 23 May 1962 (aged 81)
- Occupation(s): Chemical engineer, Parapsychologist

René Warcollier (8 April 1881 – 23 May 1962) was a French chemical engineer and parapsychologist. He was president of the Institut Métapsychique International, and edited and wrote theoretical and experimental reports for its journal.

== Biography ==
Warcollier was born on 8 April 1881 at Omonville-la-Rouge in Paris. He obtained a degree in chemical engineering in 1903 from the École Nationale Supérieure de Chimie. He patented several processes related to the synthetic production of precious stones, and invented special screens for movie projection.

In parapsychology, Warcollier first served as treasurer of the Institut Métapsychique International (1929–1938), then editor of its journal, the Revue Métapsychique, (1938–1940), and then as its president (1951–1962). He died on 23 May 1962.

== Studies ==
Warcollier's main parapsychology studies involved experiments using a telepathy design in which one or more "agents" observed a target image while one or more "percipients" attempted to "blindly" reproduce it. Much of his work following from 1922 involved "batteries" of senders and receivers stationed across France; and he also used sender-receiver teams stationed between France and New York, and France and Great Britain. He worked with Gardner Murphy.

Supporters of Warcollier say that his experimental method was an advance in terms of evidence and informativeness on earlier studies using drawings of real objects as target stimuli. A major contemporary critic was the British parapsychologist Samuel Soal. He argued that Warcollier's method was sub-optimal as the targets were not sufficiently selected at random, and correspondences between targets and responses were identified without formal and objective limitations.

Warcollier discarded the statistical method and attempted to obtain direct evidence for telepathy. He claimed from his experiments that men transmit thoughts better than women but that women are better receivers. He also stated that younger people are more sensitive to mental impressions than the elderly. His experiments were well received by parapsychologists such as Harry Price but were criticized by the scientific community.

Warcollier reported his experiments in numerous articles, principally within 56 articles in the Revue Métapsychique published between 1924 and 1962, including "La télépathie expérimentale" (1926) and "Étude de dessins télépathiques de M. Vigneron au cours de vingt ans d'expérimentation" (1951). Results and reflections upon them were also published in his several books, including La Télepathie (1921) and La Métapsychique (1940; 1946). Gardner Murphy arranged to have La Télepathie translated and published in the United States, with additional material from Warcollier's articles, and an address he gave to the Sorbonne in 1946, as Mind to mind (1938, 1963).

== Publications ==
- Experiments in Telepathy (1938)
- Mind to Mind (1948)
