= Hidden mother photography =

Obscured adult calms child during Victorian era long photo exposure

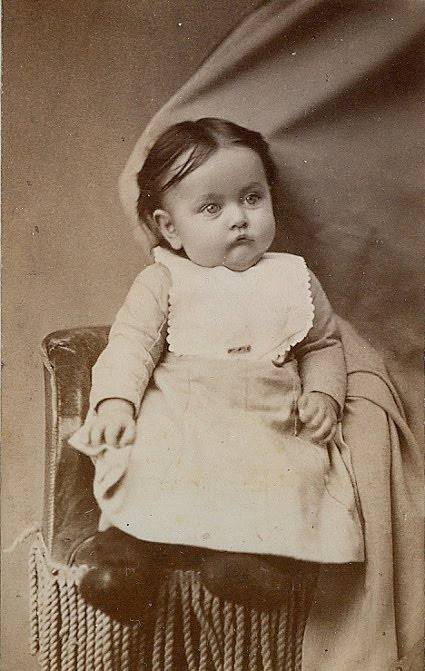
A Victorian toddler, mother's arm obscured by fabric

Hidden mother photography is a genre of photography common in the Victorian era in which young children were photographed with their mother present but hidden in the photograph. It arose from the need to keep children still while the photograph was taken due to the long exposure times of early cameras.

== History ==
The daguerreotypes that became publicly available during the 1840s had exposure times from tens of seconds to several minutes. While exposure times shrank as photographic technology developed, to get a clear picture of a child during the 19th century the child had to be persuaded to stay still, which could be difficult to achieve. One technique was for the mother—or sometimes the father, a nanny or the photographer's assistant—to be hidden within the frame, often behind curtains, under cloaks, or disguised as chairs. Mothers were also sometimes obscured simply by removing parts of the photograph afterward, or by them standing slightly off to one side so they could be cropped out. How successfully the mother was hidden varied. Sometimes, simply draped with fabric, their shape would be obvious. In some photographs, arms are clearly visible. A paper overlay could be used when framing the photograph to hide the parts showing the mother, focusing on the child instead. The practice of hidden mother photography continued into the 1920s, fading away as cameras became more ubiquitous and exposure times became faster, rendering need to hold small children rigidly still no longer necessary.

== 21st-century interest ==
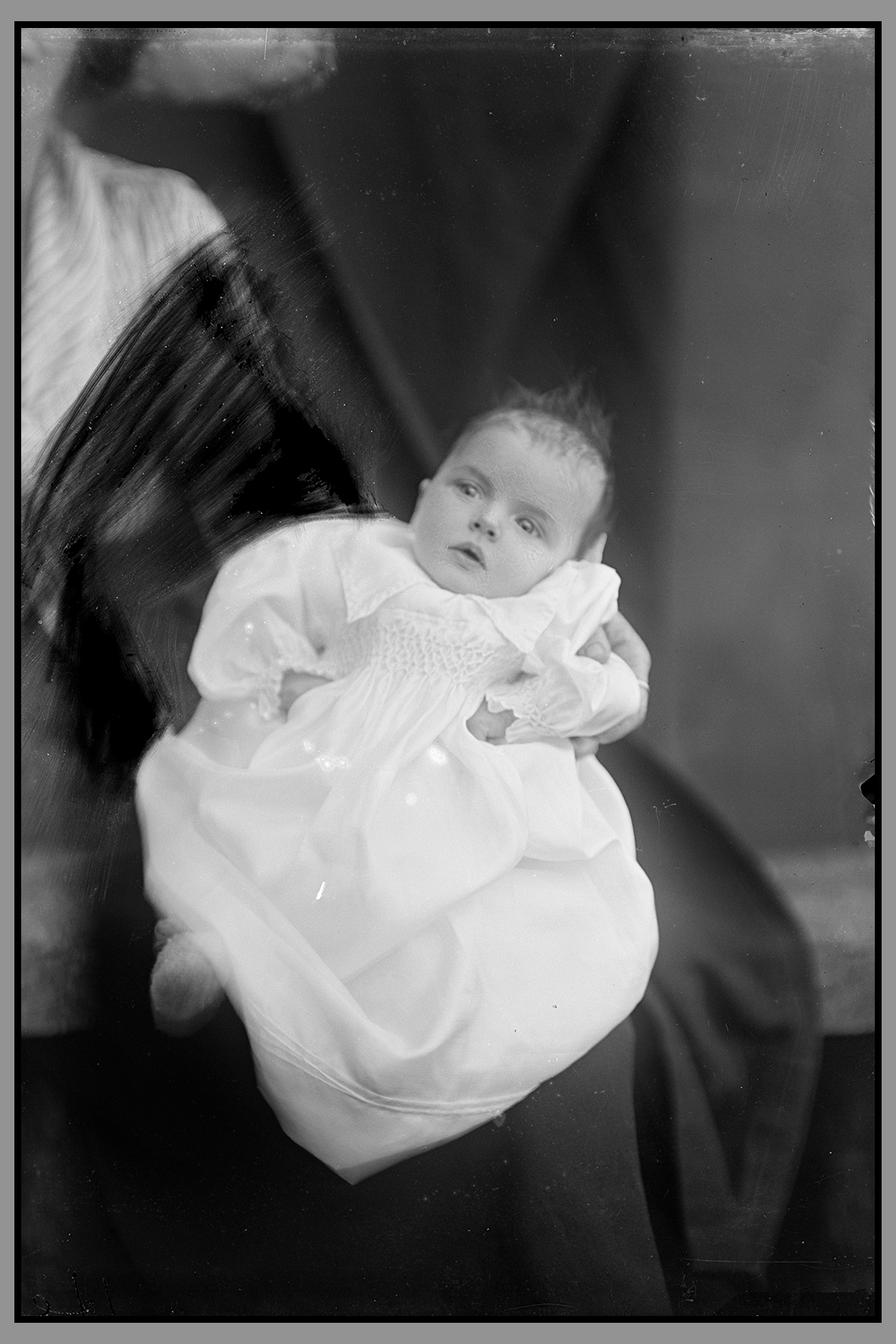
Late example of the technique, where mothers were made "hidden" by manual retouching and masking on the portrait negative

Interest in hidden mother photography spiked in the 2010s, driven in part by the rise of the Internet, which made the images more easily available. This in turn raised interest in collections of them at museums such as the Palmer Museum of Art. A Flickr pool was set up dedicated to collecting hidden mother images.

Having collected them for a decade, in 2013 Italian-Swedish artist Linda Fregni Nagler displayed 997 photographs in a series entitled The Hidden Mother at the Venetian Arsenal for the 55th Venice Biennale. She also published them in the book The Hidden Mother (2013) with words by Geoffrey Batchen and the Biennale's curator, Massimiliano Gioni. The images were produced between the 1840s and the 1920s using a variety of techniques. They include daguerreotypes, ambrotypes (which use the wet plate collodion process), tintypes and albumen prints. The first picture that prompted the collection was a 5×4 centimetre tintype described on eBay as "funny baby with hidden mother". Nagler's theory as to why the mothers are hidden, rather than simply appearing in the picture undisguised, is that "The mothers seem to have been aiming to create an intimate bond between the child and the viewer, rather than between themselves and the child."

In 2014 and 2015, photographer Laura Larson presented a series of around 35 hidden mother photographs as a touring exhibition. Her book, Hidden Mother (2017), tells the story of her daughter's adoption from Ethiopia through 26 hidden mother photographs. It was shortlisted for the Paris Photo–Aperture Foundation PhotoBook Award that year.

Lee Marks, a photography dealer from Indiana, is another long-term collector with around 600 hidden mother images.

The eerie effect of the half-obscured mothers in these pictures has led to them being compared to ghosts, including by Larson and by the tabloid press. Larson's collection began as an offshoot of her study of spirit photography of the Victorian era.

== Examples ==
Hidden mother portraits, c. 1860-1900
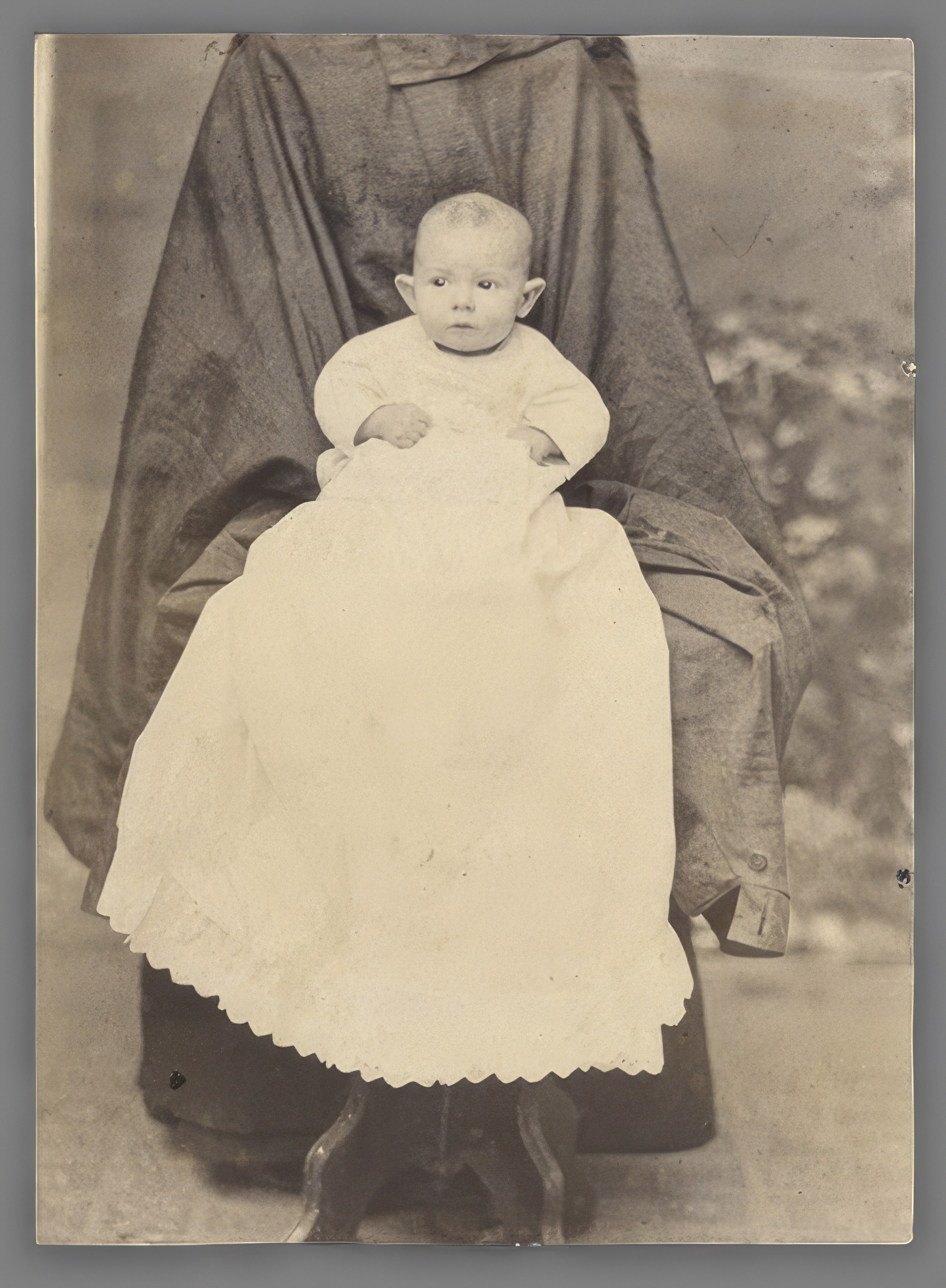
Mother completely concealed beneath blanket, c1870-1880s

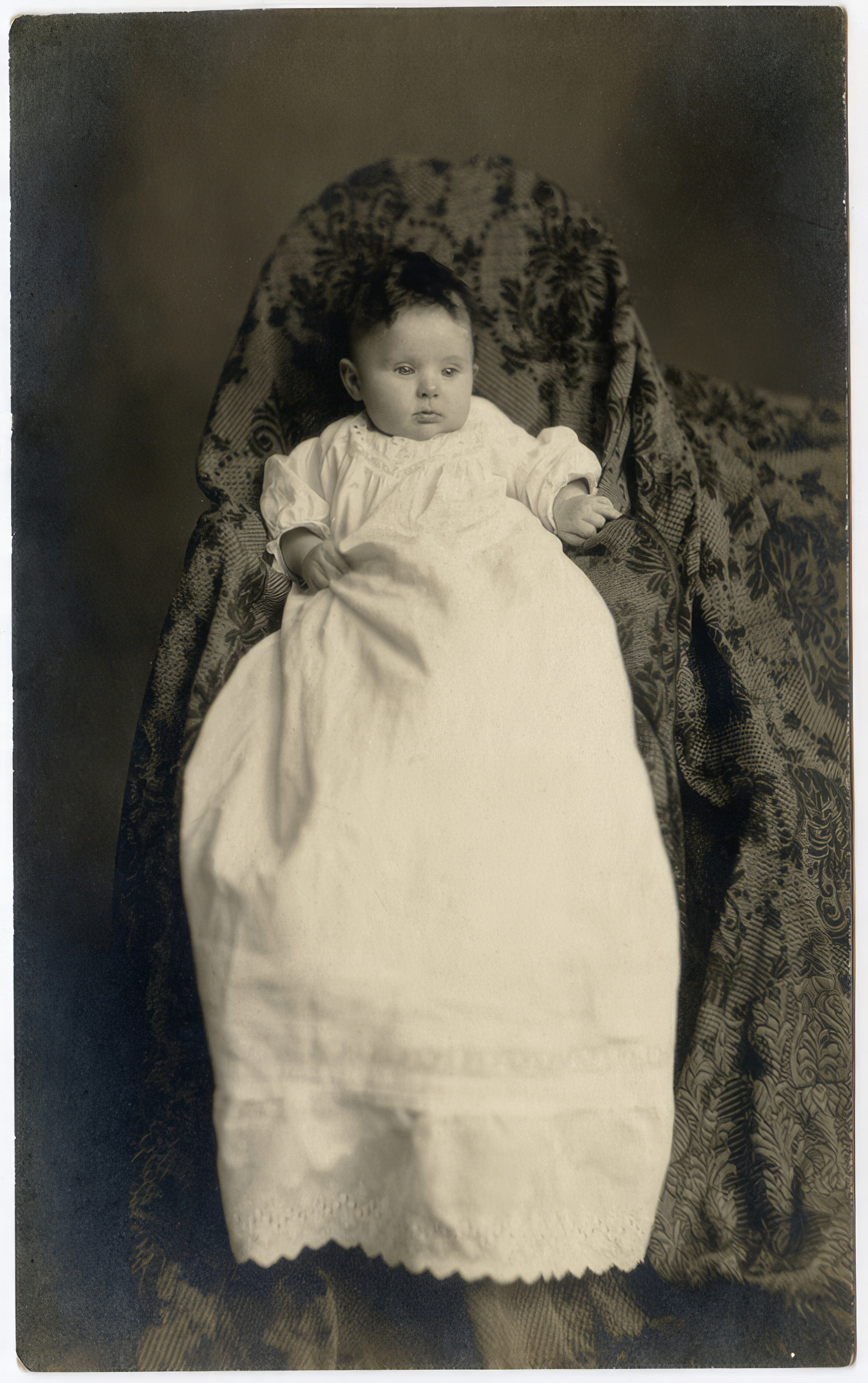
Mother concealed by blanket as well as chair frame, c. 1900

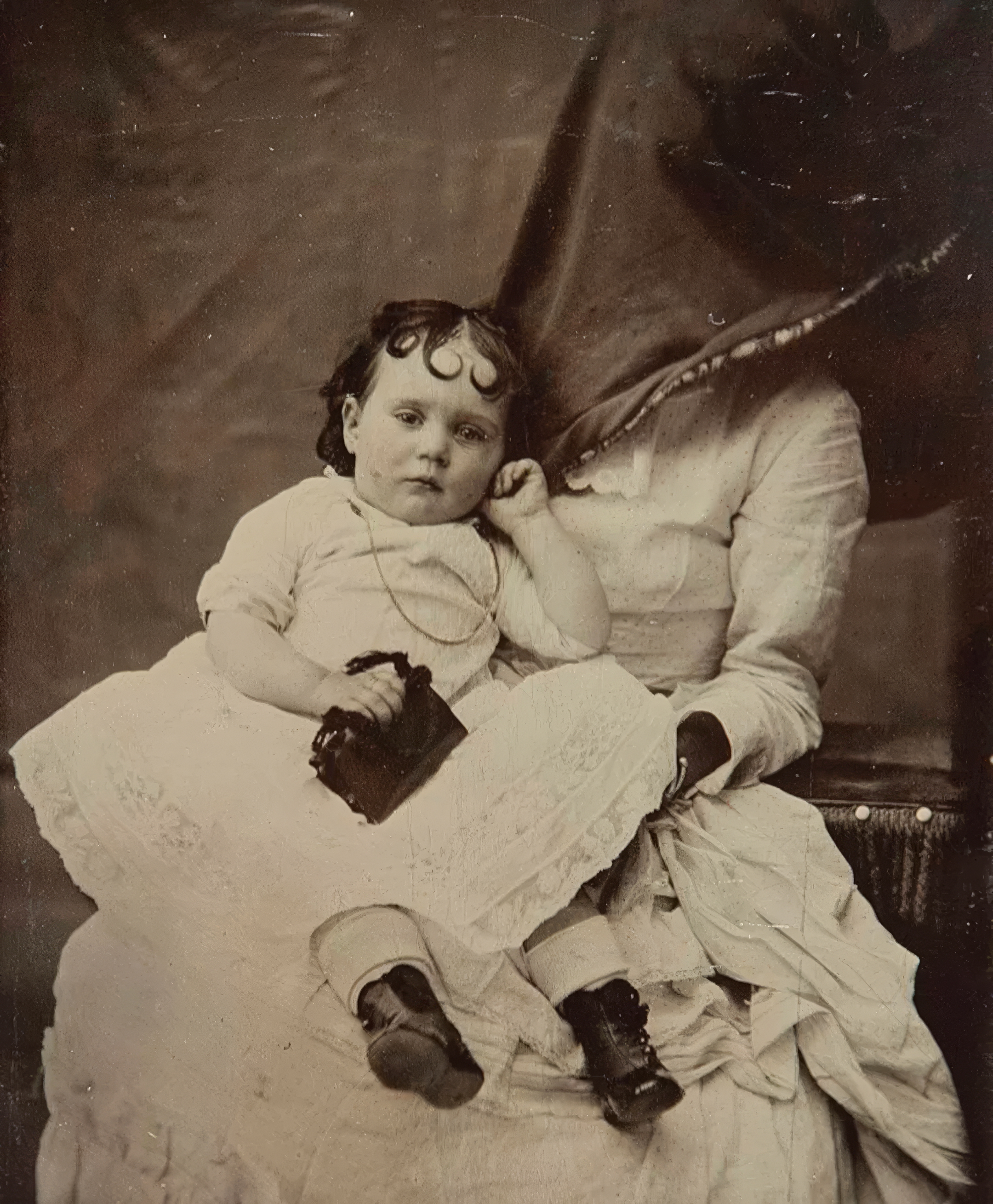
Mother is only partly concealed - this may have been less frightening for the older child, c. 1870

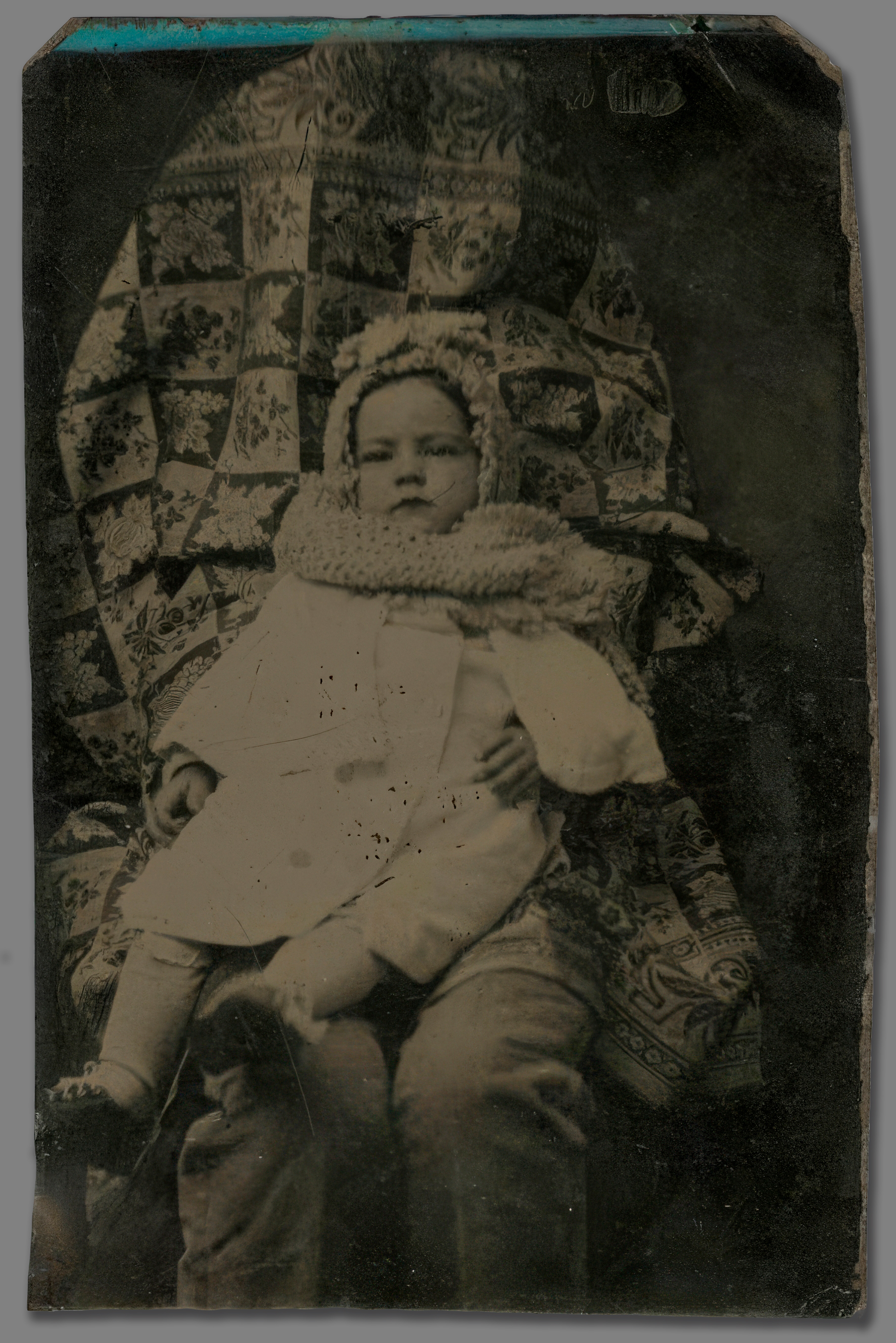
A less common example of the genre, with the child appeared to be seated on her father's lap, c. 1880
