= Edward Wyllie =

British medium and spirit photographer

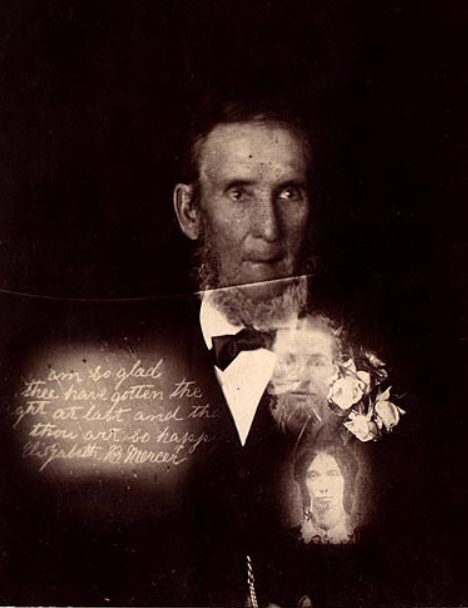
Alleged spirit photograph produced by Wyllie

Edward Arthur Sanders Wyllie (28 January 1848 – 6 March 1911) was a British medium and spirit photographer.

Wyllie was born in Calcutta, British India, as a British subject, and moved to England as a small boy. He moved to California in 1886 to work as a photographer. He also worked as a medium and spirit photographer. His spirit photographs were exposed as frauds. Negatives of pre-made spirit images were found in his house and it was also discovered that Wyllie had used a method of "palming small spirit drawings executed in luminous paint and pressing them to the photographic plate" which he confessed to.

He died in London in 1911.
