= Charles Lakeman Tweedale =

British Anglican minister and spiritualist

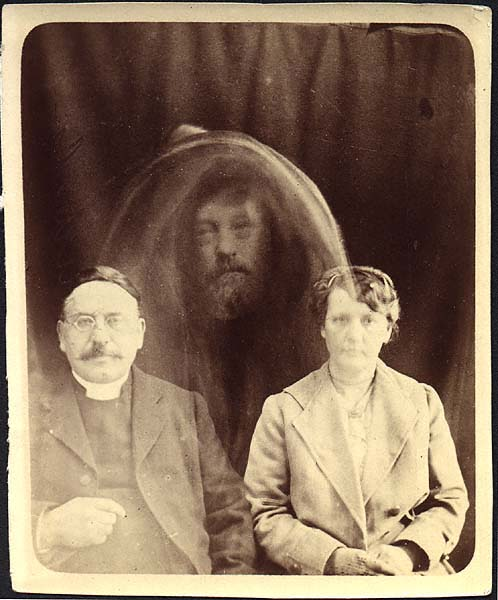
- Charles Tweedale and Mrs. Tweedale in a 'spirit' photograph taken by William Hope.
- Occupations: Anglican minister, spiritualist

Charles Lakeman Tweedale (died 29 June 1944), most well known as Charles L. Tweedale, was a British Anglican minister and spiritualist.

== Career ==
Tweedale was educated at Durham University. He was the Anglican Vicar of Weston, North Yorkshire. He was a convinced spiritualist and in the early 1920s founded the Society of Communion for spiritualist members of the Church of England. The society "insisted on the acceptance of the doctrine of the divinity of Christ and existed mainly to encourage psychic study among Anglicans." He defended his friend the spirit photographer William Hope from charges of fraud.

It was alleged that Tweedale's family home, the Weston Vicarage, was haunted by their deceased aunt and her phantom dog. The "hauntings" were principally recorded between 1905-1923. The psychical researcher W. W. Baggally from the Society for Psychical Research interviewed witnesses and declared the phenomena genuine. However, skeptics were unconvinced noting that "as with most investigations of hauntings, you either believe the witnesses or you don't, for there is no other evidence." The psychical researcher Frank Podmore suggested that some of the visions may have been hallucinations.

== Publications ==
- Man's Survival After Death (Four editions 1909, 1920, 1925, 1931)
- Present Day Spirit Phenomena and the Churches (1917)
- The Vindication of William Hope (1933)
- News From the Next World (1940)

== See also ==
- Stanley De Brath
- Charles Drayton Thomas
