= William Hope (paranormal investigator) =

English Psychic Photographer

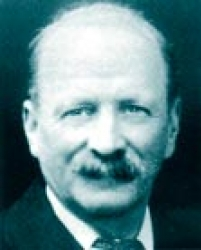
- Born: 1863; Crewe, Cheshire, England
- Died: 8 March 1933 (aged 70); Salford, England
- Occupation: Spiritualist
- Organization: Crewe Circle

William Hope (1863 – 8 March 1933) was a pioneer of spirit photography. Based in Crewe, England, he was a member of the well known spiritualists group, the Crewe Circle. He died in Salford hospital on 8 March 1933.

== Biography ==
As a young man Hope was employed as a carpenter, but he quickly came to prominence in paranormal circles after claiming to be able to capture images of spirits on camera. Hope produced his first spirit image in 1905. Soon afterwards he formed the Crewe Circle Spiritualist group, with himself as the leader.

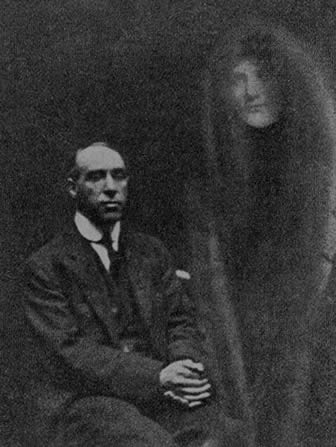
Harry Price, and friend. As taken by William Hope

In 1916, Hope managed to dupe William Crookes with a fake spirit photograph of his wife. Oliver Lodge revealed there had been obvious signs of double exposure – the picture of Lady Crookes had been copied from a wedding anniversary photograph. However, Crookes was a convinced spiritualist and claimed it was genuine evidence for spirit photography. Doubts were also raised about his spirit photography in 1908.

Hope was first exposed in 1920 by Edward Bush who had caught Hope out by using a trap. He used the fake name "Wood" and sent a letter to Hope with a photograph of a living person which he pretended was his deceased son. He later attended a sitting with Hope. Hope produced a "spirit" extra which was exactly the same as the photograph he had sent Hope and on it were the words "Dear friend Wood". The psychical researcher Whately Carington wrote regarding the exposure "any reasonable person will say that Mr Bush had proved his case." In 1921, Mr DeVaga, a friend of the magician Harry Houdini, attended a sitting with Hope. DeVaga found the dark conditions in the room suspicious and suspected that Hope had switched a plate.

=== Price investigation ===
In February 1922, the Society for Psychical Research and the paranormal investigator Harry Price with James Seymour, Eric Dingwall and William Marriott demonstrated that Hope was fraudulent during tests at the British College of Psychic Science. Price wrote in his report "William Hope has been found guilty of deliberately substituting his own plates for those of a sitter... It implies that the medium brings to the sitting a duplicate slide and faked plates for fraudulent purposes."

Price secretly marked Hope's photographic plates, and provided him with a packet of additional plates that had been covertly etched with the brand image of the Imperial Dry Plate Co. Ltd. in the knowledge that the logo would be transferred to any images created with them. Unaware that Price had tampered with his supplies, Hope then attempted to produce a number of spirit photographs. Although Hope produced several images of spirits, none of his materials contained the Imperial Dry Plate Co. Ltd logo, or the marks that Price had put on Hope's original equipment, showing that he had exchanged prepared materials containing fake spirit images for the provided materials.

Price later re-published the Society's experiment in a pamphlet of his own called Cold Light on Spiritualistic "Phenomena" - An Experiment with the Crewe Circle. Due to the exposure of Hope and other fraudulent spiritualists, Arthur Conan Doyle led a mass resignation of eighty-four members of the Society for Psychical Research, as they believed the Society was opposed to spiritualism.

Doyle threatened to have Price evicted from his laboratory and claimed if he persisted to write "sewage" about spiritualists, he would meet the same fate as Harry Houdini. Doyle and other spiritualists attacked Price and tried for years to have Price take his pamphlet out of circulation. Price wrote "Arthur Conan Doyle and his friends abused me for years for exposing Hope."

Despite Price's findings, Hope still retained a noted following amongst spiritualists. Doyle refused to accept any evidence that Hope was a fraud and even invoked a conspiracy that Price and other researchers had framed Hope. On this, Massimo Polidoro has written "the case of William Hope and his Crewe Circle deserves to be remembered today because it shows that it is practically impossible (and futile) to try to convince someone who wants to believe even in the face of quite convincing contrary evidence."

=== Further exposures ===
Hope's exposures were discussed in detail by James Black in an article for the Scientific American in 1922. He concluded that Hope was a "common cheat who obtains money under false pretenses." Fred Barlow, a former friend and supporter of Hope's work and also the former Secretary of the Society for the Study of Supernormal Pictures, along with Major W. Rampling-Rose, gave a joint lecture to the Society for Psychical Research to present findings gleaned from an extensive series of tests on the methods Hope used to produce his spirit photographs. They concluded that the spirits that appeared in Hope's photographs were produced fraudulently. In 1933, Hope was discredited when the pair presented their case in depth against him in the Proceedings of the Society for Psychical Research.

The psychical researcher Eric Dingwall also noted another exposure. It involved James Hewat McKenzie who had discovered fraud but failed to make it public. According to Paul Tabori:

In 1933 the widow of the proprietor of the British College for Psychic Science (where Price's séance with Hope took place) admitted in an article that after the sitting her husband went through Hope's luggage and "found in a suitcase a flash lamp with a bulb attached, some cut-out photographic heads and some hair". These basic facts were suppressed in 1922 and William Hope wasn't "laid-low" conclusively until 1944 when Fred Barlow and W. Rampling-Rose proved finally that during the extensive series of experiments they had conducted with Hope all the "spirit extras" they had obtained could have been fraudulently produced."

During his photography sessions, Hope would sometimes carry out prayers and religious hymns. A 1969 entry for Hope in The Focal Encyclopedia of Photography described him as "undoubtedly a schizophrenic. On one side of his character was an alert, witty and patently honest North- countryman, whilst on the other hand there was the bogus medium who used prayers and psalm-singing as a cloak for his fraudulent operations."

== Gallery ==
Examples of Hope's work.

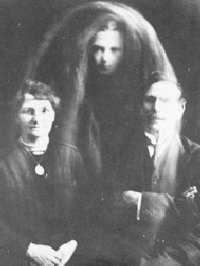
Mr and Mrs Gibson and the spirit of their deceased son (1919).

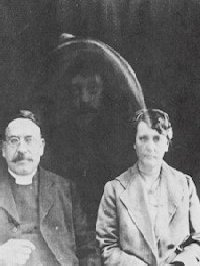
Reverend Charles Lakeman Tweedale, his wife, and the spirit of her deceased father (5 September 1919).

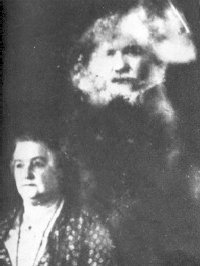
Mrs Hortense Leverson and the spirit of her deceased husband, Major Leverson (1931).

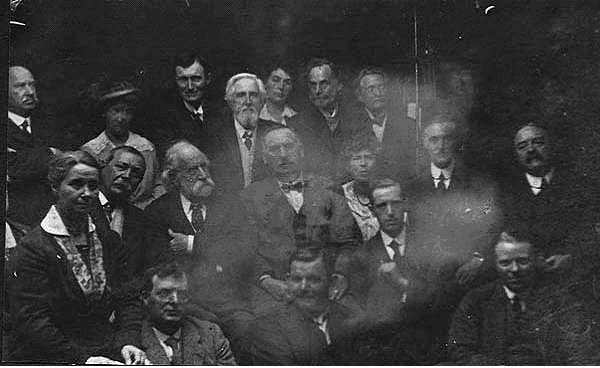
The annual meeting of the "Society for the Study of Supernormal Pictures". Including Sir Arthur Conan Doyle and his wife (Center, Left) (1922).

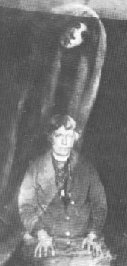
Mrs Longcake and the spirit of her deceased sister-in-law.

== See also ==
- Harry Price
- Society for the Study of Supernormal Pictures
