= Charles Richet =

French physiologist, Nobel laureate and spiritualist (1850–1935)

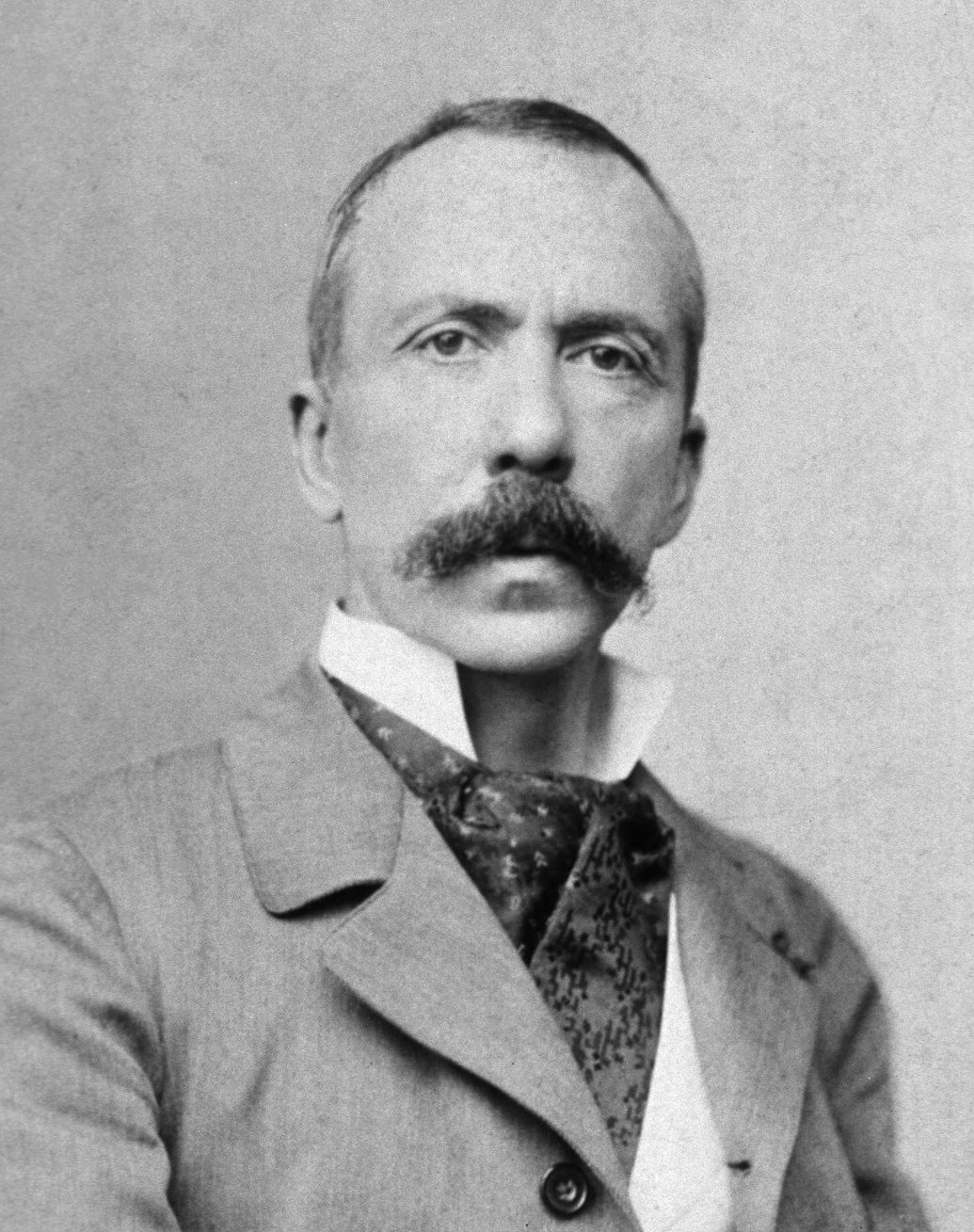
- Born: 25 August 1850; Paris, France
- Died: 4 December 1935 (aged 85); Paris, France
- Education: University of Paris
- Scientific career
- Thesis: Des propriétés chimiques et physiologiques du suc gastrique chez l'homme et chez les animaux (1878)

Charles Robert Richet (French pronunciation: [ʃaʁl ʁɔbɛʁ ʁiʃɛ]; 25 August 1850 – 4 December 1935) was a French physiologist at the Collège de France and immunology pioneer. In 1913, he won the Nobel Prize in Physiology or Medicine "in recognition of his work on anaphylaxis". Richet devoted many years to the study of paranormal and spiritualist phenomena, coining the term "ectoplasm". He believed in the inferiority of black people, was a proponent of eugenics, and presided over the French Eugenics Society towards the end of his life. The Richet line of professorships of medical science continued through his son Charles and his grandson Gabriel. Gabriel Richet was also one of the pioneers of European nephrology.

== Career ==
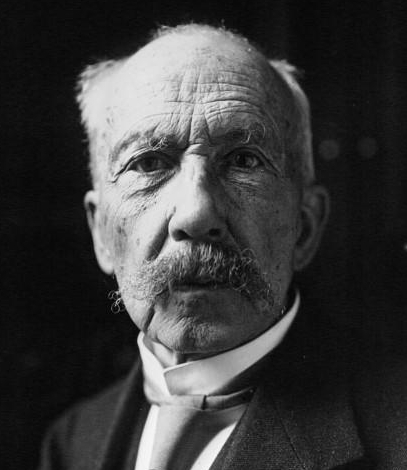
Richet in 1922

He was born on 25 August 1850 in Paris the son of Alfred Richet. He was educated at the Lycee Bonaparte in Paris then studied medicine at university in Paris.

Richet spent a period of time as an intern at the Salpêtrière hospital in Paris, where he observed Jean-Martin Charcot's work with then so called "hysterical" patients.

In 1887, Richet became professor of physiology at the Collège de France investigating a variety of subjects such as neurochemistry, digestion, thermoregulation in homeothermic animals, and breathing. In 1898, he became a member of the Académie de Médecine. In 1914, he became a member of the Académie des Sciences.

Richet discovered the analgesic drug chloralose with Maurice Hanriot.

Richet had many interests, and he wrote books about history, sociology, philosophy, psychology, as well as theatre and poetry. He was a pioneer in aviation.

He was involved in the French pacifist movement. Starting in 1902, pacifist societies began to meet at a National Peace Congress, often with several hundred attendees. Unable to unify the pacifist forces they set up a small permanent delegation of French Pacifist Societies in 1902, which Richet led, together with Lucien Le Foyer as secretary-general.

== Discovery of anaphylaxis ==
Richet, working with Paul Portier, discovered the phenomenon of anaphylaxis. In 1901, they joined Albert I, Prince of Monaco on a scientific expedition around the French coast of Atlantic Ocean. On board Albert's ship, Princesse Alice II, they extracted a toxin (which they called a hypnotoxin) that is produced by cnidarians such as Portuguese man o' war and sea anemone (Actinia sulcata).

In their first experiment on the ship, they injected a dog with the toxin, expecting the dog to develop immunity (tolerance) to the toxin, but instead it suffered a severe immune reaction (hypersensitivity). In 1902, they repeated the injections in their laboratory and found that dogs normally tolerated the toxin at first injection, but when given subsequent injections three weeks later, they always developed fatal shock, regardless of the dose of the toxin they were given. Thus, they discovered that the first dose, instead of inducing tolerance (prophylaxis) as they had expected, caused further doses to be deadly.

In 1902, Richet coined the term aphylaxis to describe the phenomenon; he later changed it to anaphylaxis because he thought it was more euphonious. The term is from the Greek ἀνά-, ana-, meaning "against", and φύλαξις, phylaxis, meaning "protection". On 15 February 1902, Richet and Portier jointly presented their experiments to the Societé de Biologie in Paris. Their research is regarded as the beginning of the scientific study of allergy (the word was coined by Clemens von Pirquet in 1906). It helped explain hay fever and other allergic reactions to foreign substances, asthma, certain reactions to intoxication, and certain cases of sudden cardiac death. Richet continued to study the phenomenon of anaphylaxis, and in 1913 was awarded the Nobel Prize in Physiology or Medicine for his work.

== Parapsychology ==
Richet was deeply interested in the idea of extrasensory perception, and in hypnosis. In 1884, Alexandr Aksakov interested him in the medium of Eusapia Palladino. In 1891, Richet founded the Annales des sciences psychiques. He kept in touch with renowned occultists and spiritualists of his time such as Albert von Schrenck-Notzing, Frederic William Henry Myers and Gabriel Delanne. In 1919, Richet became honorary chairman of the Institut Métapsychique International in Paris, and, in 1930, its full-time president.

Richet hoped to find a physical mechanism that would scientifically validate the existence of paranormal phenomena. He wrote: "It has been shown that as regards subjective metapsychics the simplest and most rational explanation is to suppose the existence of a faculty of supernormal cognition ... setting in motion the human intelligence by certain vibrations that do not move the normal senses." In 1905, Richet was named president of the Society for Psychical Research in the United Kingdom.

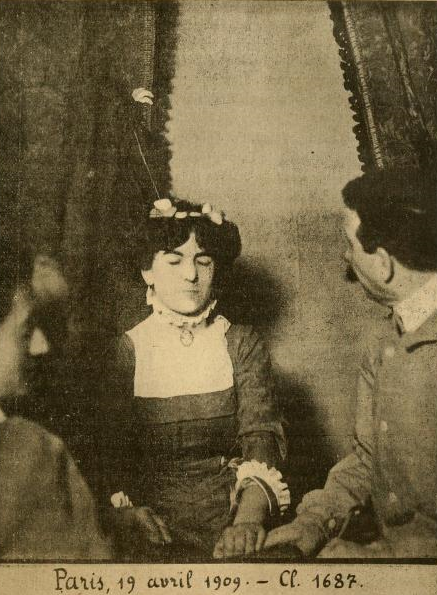
Linda Gazzera a medium Richet investigated, in Paris, 1909.

In 1894, Richet coined the term ectoplasm. Richet believed that some apparent mediumship could be explained physically as due to the external projection of a material substance (ectoplasm) from the body of the medium, but he didn't believe that this proposed substance had anything to do with spirits. He rejected the spirit hypothesis of mediumship as unscientific, instead supporting the sixth-sense hypothesis. According to Richet:

It seems to me prudent not to give credence to the spiritistic hypothesis... it appears to me still (at the present time, at all events) improbable, for it contradicts (at least apparently) the most precise and definite data of physiology, whereas the hypothesis of the sixth sense is a new physiological notion which contradicts nothing that we learn from physiology. Consequently, although in certain rare cases spiritism supplies an apparently simpler explanation, I cannot bring myself to accept it. When we have fathomed the history of these unknown vibrations emanating from reality – past reality, present reality, and even future reality – we shall doubtless have given them an unwonted degree of importance. The history of the Hertzian waves shows us the ubiquity of these vibrations in the external world, imperceptible to our senses.

He hypothesized a "sixth sense", an ability to perceive hypothetical vibrations, and he discussed this idea in his 1928 book Our Sixth Sense. Although he believed in extrasensory perception, Richet did not believe in life after death or spirits.

He investigated and studied various mediums, such as Eva Carrière, William Eglinton, Pascal Forthuny, Stefan Ossowiecki, Leonora Piper and Raphael Schermann. From 1905 to 1910, Richet attended many séances led by the medium Linda Gazzera, claiming that she was a genuine medium who had performed psychokinesis, meaning that various objects had been moved in the séance room purely through the force of the mind. Gazzera was exposed as a fraud in 1911. Richet was also fooled into believing that Joaquin María Argamasilla, known as the "Spaniard with X-ray Eyes", had genuine psychic powers. Harry Houdini exposed Argamasilla as a fraud in 1924. According to Joseph McCabe, Richet was also duped by the fraudulent mediums Eva Carrière and Eusapia Palladino.

The historian Ruth Brandon criticized Richet as credulous when it came to psychical research, pointing to "his will to believe, and his disinclination to accept any unpalatably contrary indications".

== Eugenics and racial beliefs ==
Richet was a proponent of eugenics, advocating sterilization and marriage prohibition for those with mental disabilities. He expressed his eugenist ideas in his 1919 book La Sélection Humaine. From 1920 to 1926 he presided over the French Eugenics Society.

Psychologist Gustav Jahoda has noted that Richet "was a firm believer in the inferiority of blacks", comparing black people to apes, and intellectually to imbeciles.

== Works ==
Richet's works on parapsychological subjects, which dominated his later years, include Traité de Métapsychique (Treatise on Metapsychics, 1922), Notre Sixième Sens (Our Sixth Sense, 1928), L'Avenir et la Prémonition (The Future and Premonition, 1931) and La Grande Espérance (The Great Hope, 1933).

- Maxwell, J & Richet, C. Metapsychical Phenomena: Methods and Observations (London: Duckworth, 1905).
- Richet, C. Physiologie Travaux du Laboratoire (Paris: Felix Alcan, 1909)
- Richet, C. La Sélection Humaine (Paris: Felix Alcan, 1919)
- Richet, C. Traité De Métapsychique (Paris: Felix Alcan, 1922).
- Richet, C. Thirty Years of Psychical Research (New York: The Macmillan Company, 1923).
- Richet, C. Our Sixth Sense (London: Rider, 1928).

== See also ==
- Breguet-Richet Gyroplane
- Eusapia Palladino
