= West Midlands Ghost Club =

- Formation: 1989
- Type: Paranormal Investigators
- Location: Willenhall
- Region served: West Midlands
- Official language: English
- Founder: Nick Duffy
- Volunteers: 13

The West Midlands Ghost Club is a ghost-hunting club formed in 1989. The groups stated goal is 'to study and investigate (alleged) paranormal activity within the West Midlands'. They are the oldest paranormal investigative group in the West Midlands.

The group was founded by Nick Duffy in 1989 and began with five volunteer members; this has now expanded to thirteen. They are based in Willenhall.

The group claims to have collected evidence in support of the existence of ghosts including 'inexplicable footsteps' in the Court Oak pub in Harborne. They have completed investigations for Alton Towers and have been hired as consultants by the BBC, ITV & Channel 4. They have performed over 100 investigations at haunted locations all over the West Midlands.

Unlike other ghost clubs in the area, the group has a policy against taking psychics or sceptics along to investigations. They do not conduct scientific experiments as a matter of principle and the group's founder has said repeatedly that he thinks no one has an explanation for what ghostly phenomenon is.
