= James Hewat McKenzie =

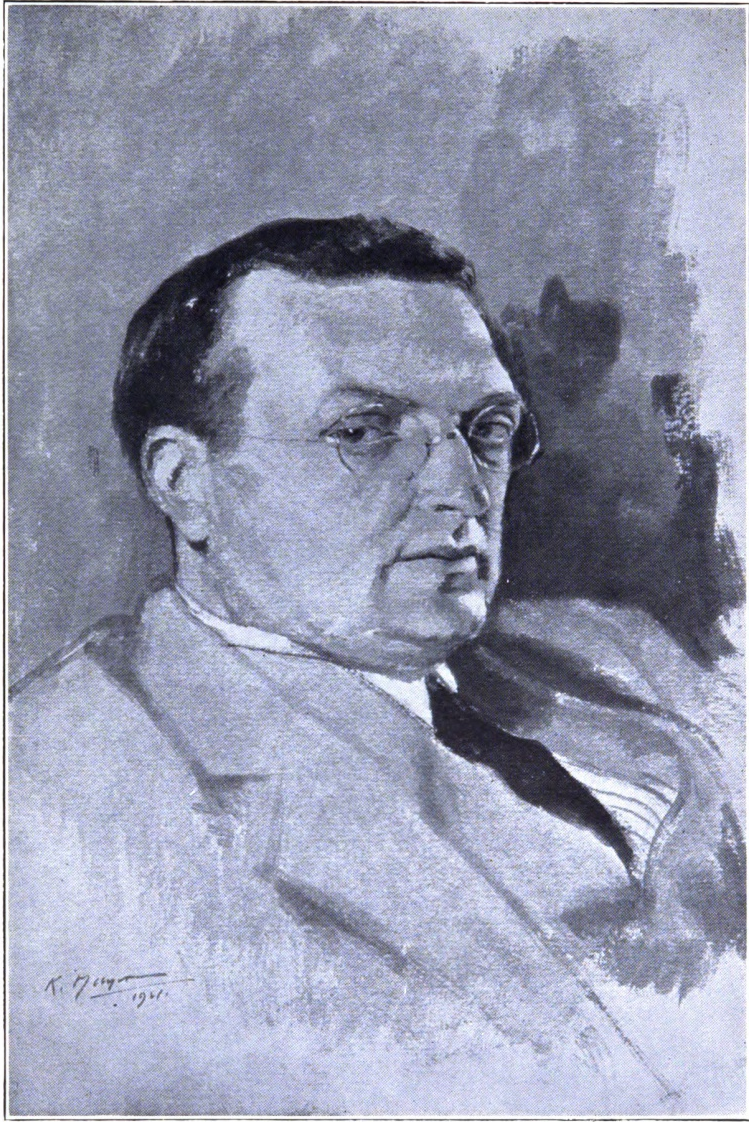
James Hewat McKenzie

James Hewat McKenzie (1869–1929) was a British parapsychologist, and the founder of the British College of Psychic Science. McKenzie was born in Edinburgh, Scotland, on 11 November 1869 and died on 29 August 1929, in London.

== Biography ==
Through years of study and experimentation with hypnotists and mediums, Mckenzie wrote what is considered his main work, Spirit Intercourse: Its Theory and Practice in 1917. A number of pamphlets on the related topics also bear his name including his 1917 work If a Soldier Die in and Personal Experiences in Spiritualism 1920. He left his practice as a psychologist and psychoanalyst in 1900 to pursue parapsychology and the occult sciences as a result of being disenfranchised by traditional theology and science not being able to reconcile themselves. He devoted his time to helping spiritual mediums develop their abilities. Such mediums included Gladys Osborne Leonard, Franek Kluski, Maria Silbert and Eileen J. Garrett.

He spent a number of years touring and lecturing in the United States both seeking and studying mediums he also spent quite some time in the middle east, Germany, Austria, and Poland for this same purpose, finally returning home to England in 1920. McKenzie's contributions to parapsychology and its coming of age in the great spiritual movement of the early 20th century can be considered his greatest legacy, paving the way for future study of clairvoyance, extrasensory perception and remote viewing. However, allegations of fraud and mismanagement, as well as hoaxing, plagued McKenzie's research. It is stated in the Gale Encyclopedia of Occultism & Parapsychology "A devoted Spiritualist, McKenzie had no scientific training. Characterized by a strong, assertive personality, he was known to cover up evidence of fraud when he discovered it."

=== British College of Psychic Science ===
The British College of Psychic Science was founded in April 1920 in London by McKenzie and his wife to study psychical phenomena, similar to the Institut Métapsychique International in Paris. In December 1938 the college merged with the International Institute for Psychical Research, becoming the Institute for Experimental Metaphysics. During World War II the institute closed, and in 1947 all of its library and records were destroyed.

=== Harry Houdini ===
In his book Spirit Intercourse: Its Theory and Practice, McKenzie claimed the magician Harry Houdini's feats such as being able to unbolt locked doors and escape from handcuffs were the result of psychic power. McKenzie also claimed in his book that Houdini had the power to materialize and dematerialize objects and other stage mentalists such as Anna Eva Fay and Julius and Agnes Zancig had genuine psychic powers. Houdini referred to this as "one of the most, if not the most flagrant instances of mal-observation" and in his book Magician Among the Spirits wrote a response to McKenzie "I do claim to free myself from the restraint of fetters and confinement, but positively state that I accomplish my purpose purely by physical, not psychical means. The force necessary to "shot a bolt within a lock," is drawn from Houdini the living human being and not a medium. My methods are perfectly natural, resting on natural laws of physics."

Psychical researcher Eric Dingwall wrote regarding McKenzie that "In spite of his massive credulity and disregard of scientific evidence he was a remarkable example of the spiritualist business-man; and it is better to remember him for his many good qualities than to stress his naïve belief in Houdini’s "psychic" powers".

== Publications ==
- Spirit Intercourse: Its Theory and Practice (1917)
