= Ghost Research Society =

Paranormal research organization

The Ghost Research Society (formerly known as the Ghost Tracker's Club) is a paranormal research society, founded in the late 1970s by Martin V. Riccardo.

== History ==
The Society was founded as the Ghost Tracker's Club in 1977 but changed its name to the Ghost Research Society in 1982.

== Investigations ==
The Ghost Research Society began investigations in the late 1970s and has looked into many famous cases including those at Bachelor's Grove Cemetery. Dale Kaczmarek, the current president, assumed his position in 1982. From the outset of its investigations the society has endeavored to use technology. In 1994, the organization collaborated with the American Society for Psychical Research to produce the National Directory of Haunted Places.

== Current status ==
Though the group is based in Oak Lawn, Illinois, it has an international membership. The society produces a quarterly newsletter called the Ghost Tracker's Newsletter and gives bus tours of Chicago's supposedly haunted locations.
