= Spirit photography =

Attempt to capture images of ghosts or spirits

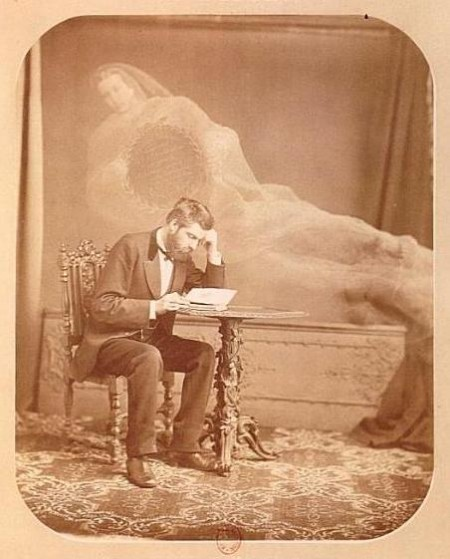
Spirit photograph by Édouard Isidore Buguet

Spirit photography (also called ghost photography) is a type of photography whose primary goal is to capture images of ghosts and other spiritual entities, especially in ghost hunting. It dates back to the late 19th century. The end of the American Civil War and the mid-19th Century Spiritualism movement contributed greatly to the popularity of spirit photography. The omnipresence of death in the Victorian period created a desire for evidence of the afterlife, and those who partook in spirit photography oftentimes hoped to receive images that depicted the likeness of a deceased relative or loved one. Photographers such as William Mumler and William Hope ran thriving businesses taking photos of people with their supposed dead relatives. Both were accused of fraud, but "true believers", such as Sir Arthur Conan Doyle, refused to accept the evidence as proof of a hoax. Though taken to court, Mumler was eventually acquitted of all charges. They were never able to prove his methods.

As cameras became available to the general public, ghost photographs became common due to natural camera artifacts such as flash reflecting off dust particles, a camera strap or hair close to the lens, lens flare, pareidolia, or in modern times, deceptions using smart phone applications that add ghost images to existing photographs.

== History ==
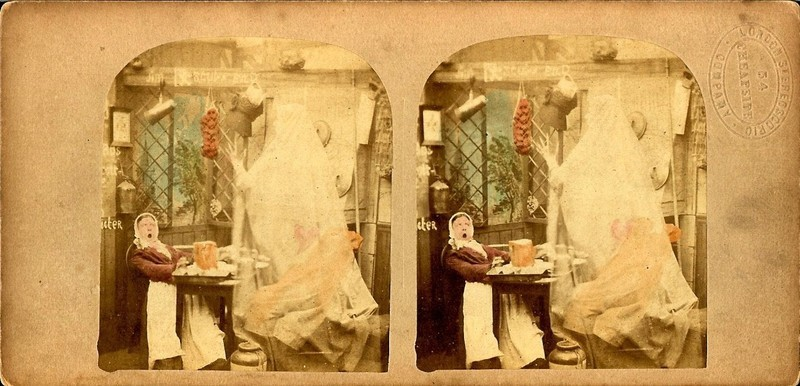
The Ghost in the Stereoscope

The first practical photography, introduced in 1839, used the daguerreotype process. In this and other early processes, the image was developed directly from the exposure plate, so multiple exposure did not normally occur. Yet, since they required long exposures, it was possible for passing movement to leave a faint image, and they were able to capture reflections in the manner of Pepper's ghost. Sir David Brewster, in 1856, recognized that these effects could be used deliberately to create ghostly pictures. The London Stereoscopic Company used Brewster's idea to create a series of images called "The Ghost in the Stereoscope".

The adoption of glass-plate negative processes around 1859 made it practical to reuse an exposure plate, with the possibility of prior images remaining visible; it was this effect that early spirit photographers relied on to create their images. As cameras fell in price and became more widespread, spirit photography boomed, although the methods could be crude. The phenomenon did not start to decline until the 1920s after skeptics such as Harry Houdini tried to counteract spiritualistic fraud.

=== Spirit photographers ===
An American jewelry engraver and amateur photographer named William Mumler published, in 1862, a photograph of what was purportedly the spirit of his cousin, who had died 12 years earlier. This first incident took place in the studios of Mrs. Helen F. Stuart in Boston. The media sensation that this caused led Mumler to leave engraving and to begin a successful business as a "Spirit Photographic Medium", established within Mrs. Stuart's studios and later moved to New York. He serviced those hoping to find a supernatural connection to lost relatives, many of them children or young men killed in the American Civil War. Mrs. Stuart is thought to have been involved in obtaining these spirit photographs.

One of Mumler's most famous images is a photograph of Mary Todd Lincoln posed with the purported spirit of her assassinated husband. The apparent spirits that Mumler had captured were thought to be double exposures of previous clients from photographic plates that were improperly cleaned. In 1869, Mumler was accused of fraud. He was acquitted, however, despite the claim that one of his so-called spirits was shown to be still alive. P.T. Barnum, who testified against Mumler, was one of his outspoken critics, declaring he was taking advantage of people's grief. Mumler later moved on to doing regular photography.

Apparent ghost photographs taken by William H. Mumler
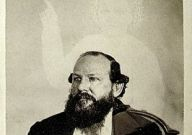
The original self portrait of William Mumler allegedly featuring the ghost of his cousin

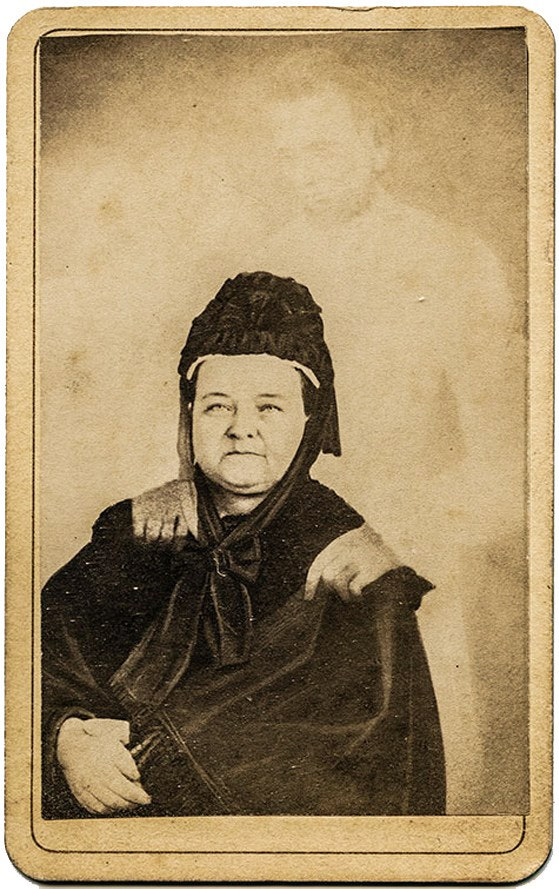
One of Mumler's most famous images, purportedly showing Mary Todd Lincoln with the ghost of her husband, Abraham Lincoln

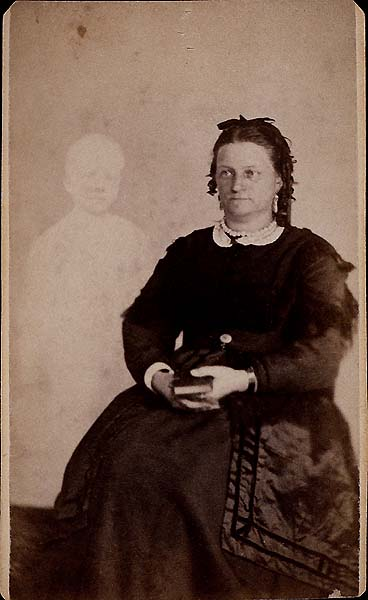
Circa 1868

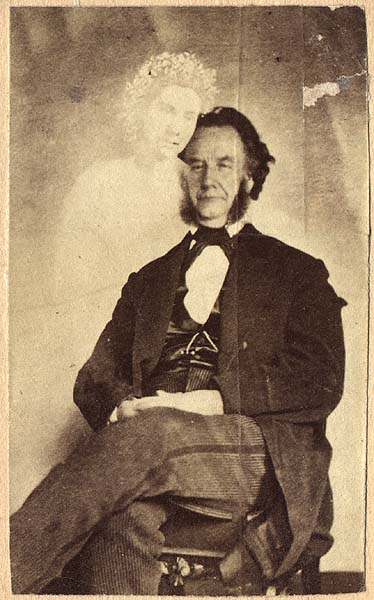
Circa 1871

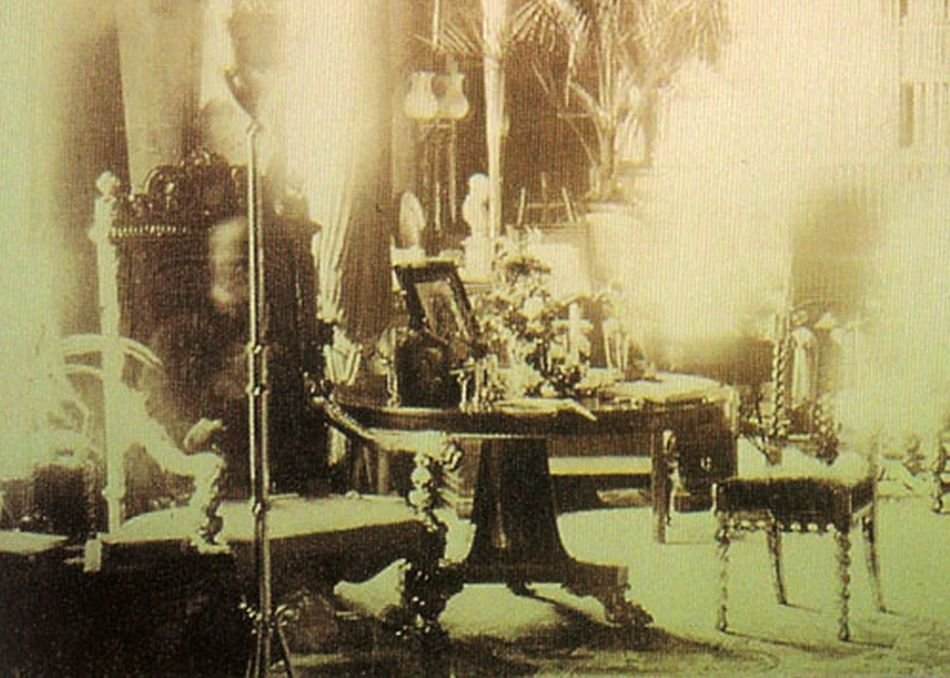
This photograph of the Library in Combermere Abbey was taken by Sybell Corbet in 1891

Spirit photography started appearing in England in 1872 from photographer Fredrick Hudson's studios. He allegedly "gimmicked" his camera to hold a pre-exposed image that would move into place when he took his photo.

In 1875, Édouard Buguet, a French spirit photographer, who also had a studio in London, was arrested in Paris and prosecuted for fraud after making a full confession. He simulated spirits by wrapping dolls in gauze and attaching photos of faces onto them. His confession was widely publicized in the French and English press.

In 1891 one of the most famous spirit photographs was taken by Sybell Corbet. She took a photo of the library at Combermere Abbey in Cheshire, England in which appeared the "...faint outline of a man's head, collar and right arm". The figure was believed to be the ghost of Lord Combermere who had recently died and was being buried at the time the photo was taken. Because the exposure was one hour, it was believed by skeptics that someone, possibly a servant, had walked into the room and paused, causing the ghostly outline.

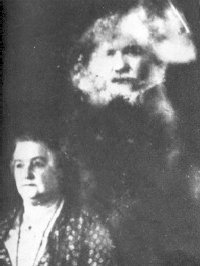
A spirit photograph taken by William Hope

One of the most famous photographers at the turn of the century was William Hope. In February 1922, Harry Price from the Society for Psychical Research, a magician named Seymour, Eric J. Dingwall and William S. Marriott showed Hope to be a fraud. They devised a plan where they presented Hope with glass negatives that had secretly been marked with X-rays. The returned plate containing the spirit had no markings. Price wrote his findings in the Journal of the Society for Psychical Research. Despite this proof, prominent spiritualists, such as Arthur Conan Doyle, claimed the report was a part of a conspiracy against Hope. Hope had continued success despite the evidence against him. Paranormal investigator Massimo Polidoro said that the case of William Hope and his followers demonstrate how difficult it can be to convince true believers, even when there is strong evidence of fraud.

Other spirit photographers exposed as frauds include David Duguid and Edward Wyllie. Ronald Pearsall exposed the tricks of spirit photography in his book The Table-Rappers (1972).

=== Early books ===
There were several books published defending the possibility of spirit photography. Among the notable books were The Case for Spirit Photography by Arthur Conan Doyle, published in 1922 where Doyle attempted to defend William Hope and his Crewe Circle, a well known spiritualist group of the time. Other spiritualists who authored books supporting spirit photography were Georgiana Houghton who wrote Chronicles of the Photographs of Spiritual Beings and Phenomena Invisible to the Material Eye (1882) and James Coates who wrote Photographing the Invisible (1911).

== Ghost photography ==
So what would be good photographic proof of ghosts? An authentic photograph of anyone born before the invention of photography would be a good start: Benjamin Franklin, William Shakespeare, or any of thousands of other people for whom we have a good record of their likeness but no photograph. Just one such photo would be more convincing than a thousand glowing blobs. Unfortunately, all the ghost photos offered so far are indistinguishable from intentional fakes and optical mistakes.

— Benjamin Radford, Skeptical Inquirer, Ghost Photos:Scams, Slipups, and Spirits, November 3, 2006

Paranormal investigator Joe Nickell makes a distinction between spirit photography and ghost photography in his book The Science of Ghosts: Searching for Spirits of the Dead, stating that spirit photography began in studios and eventually included ghosts photographed in séance rooms, whereas ghost photographs were taken in places that were considered haunted. Nickell states "...whereas spirit photos were invariably charlatans' productions, ghost photos could either be faked or appear inadvertently – as by reflection, accidental double exposure, or the like."

Once portable cameras became available to amateurs toward the end of the 1880s ghost photos became more frequent. In more modern times, cameras with built in flashes produced what some believed to be ectoplasm, or "orbs". Most ghost photos fall into one of two categories. They are either hazy, indistinct shapes that look human or orbs that are usually white and round. Both can easily be purposefully or accidentally created.

=== Modern claims ===
Television shows such as Ghost Hunters have claimed common photographic anomalies as proof of supernatural activity. In his book Investigating Ghosts: The Scientific Search for Spirits Ben Radford states that most evidence of ghosts in photographs or video are "...brief, ambiguous anomalies recorded with low-quality cameras (or good-quality cameras sabotaged by low light conditions)." Radford believes that with camera technology advancing, especially with smartphones and reduced signal dropout and video compression, there should be clearer, sharper images of ghosts. But the photos remain low quality and vague.

=== "Orbs" ===
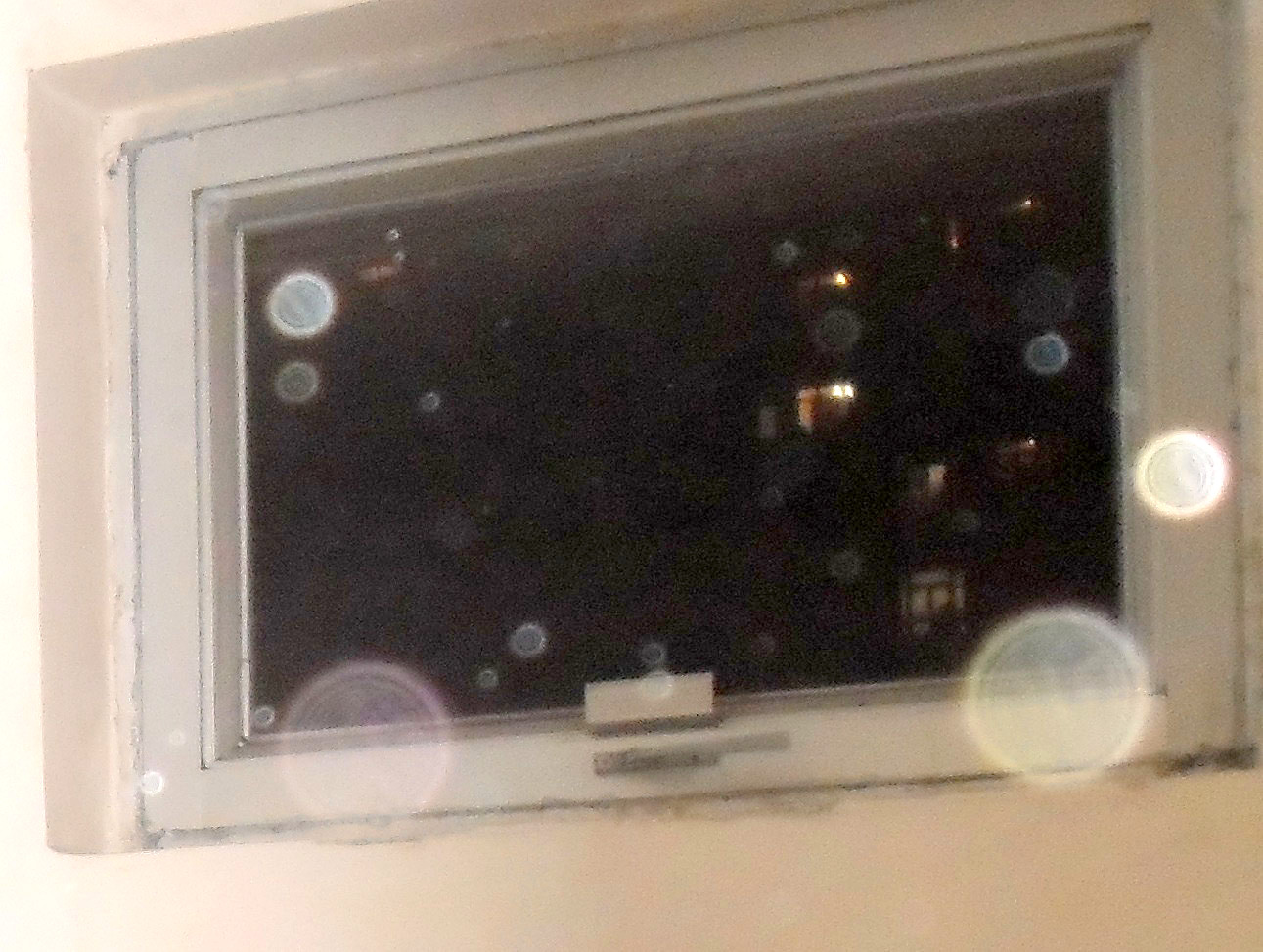
Light reflecting off dust particles

According to University of Westminster professor Annette Hill, unusual light sources were often interpreted as "ghost lights" in spirit photography. Hill says that with the advent of digital photography, "the ghost light is re-imagined as an orb", and many paranormal-themed websites show pictures containing visual artifacts they refer to as "orbs" that are claimed and debated as evidence of spirit presence, especially among ghost hunters.

However, such common visual artifacts are simply a result of flash photography reflecting light off solid particles, such as dust, pollen, insects or liquid particles, especially rain, or even foreign material within the camera lens. These effects are especially common with modern compact and ultra-compact digital cameras. Fujifilm describes the artifacts as a common photographic problem.

=== Causes for apparent ghost photographs ===
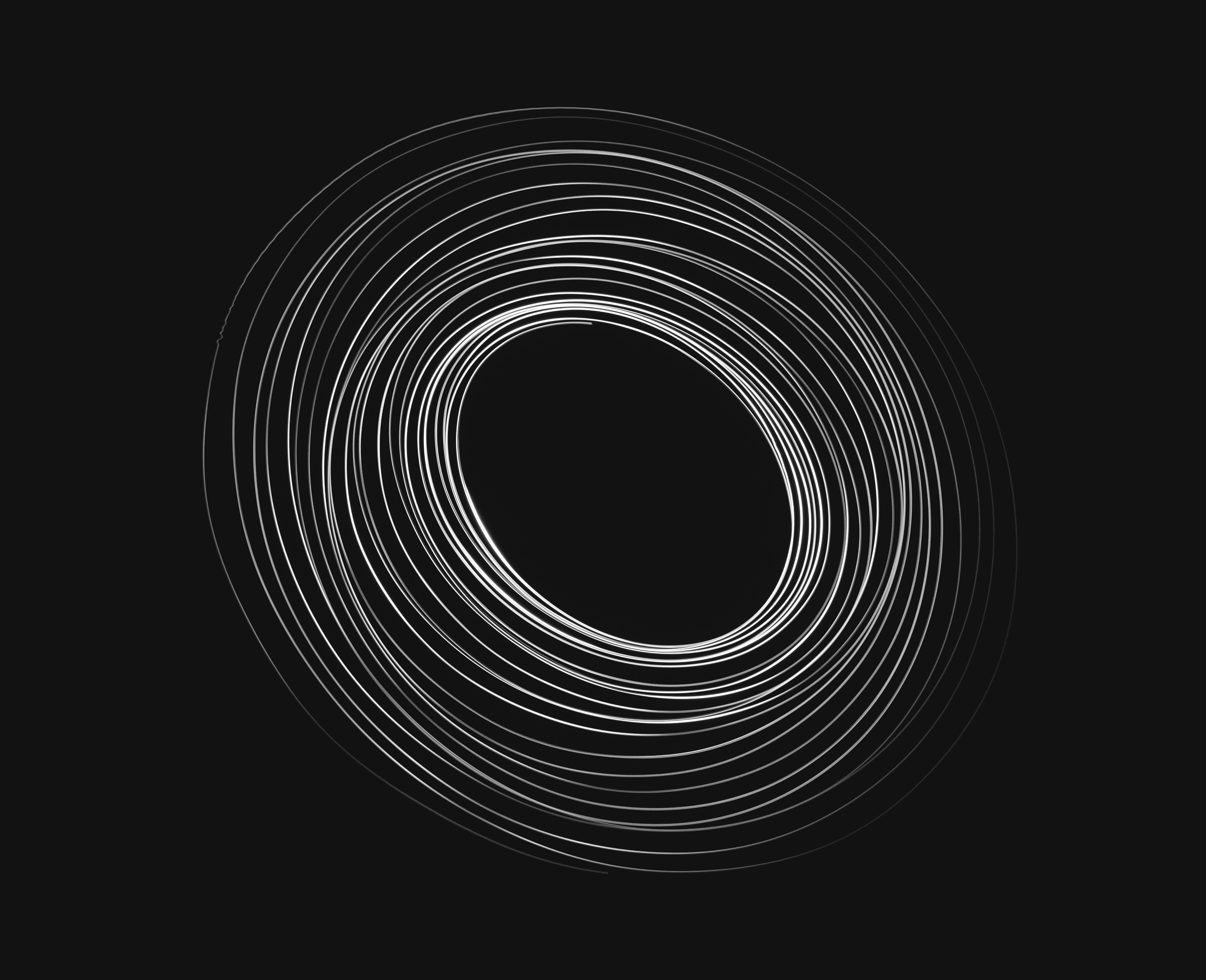
A circular shape created using light painting

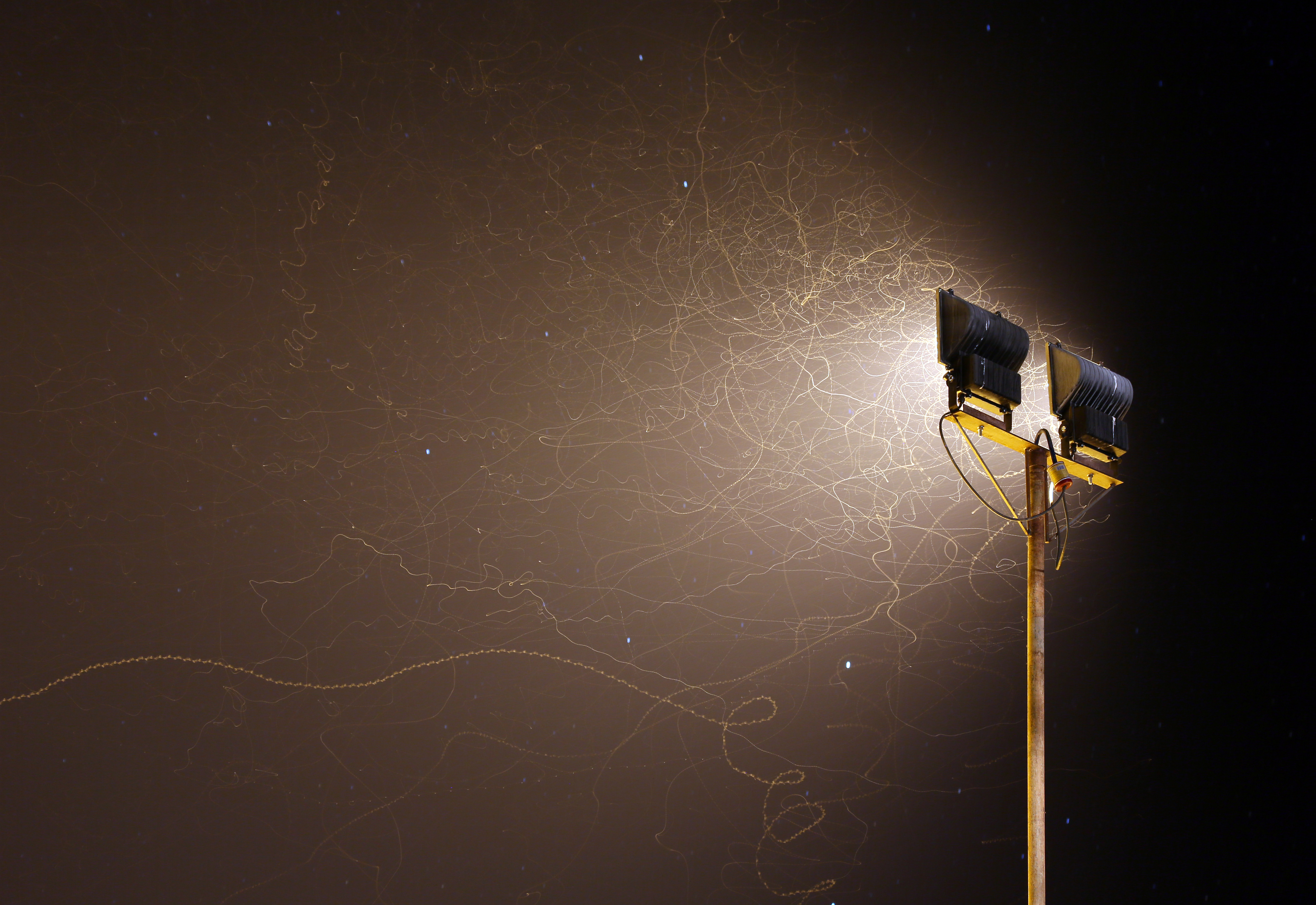
Insect flights in the night in front of a spotlight HP L7869

According to Kenny Biddle and Joe Nickell in their article So You Have a Ghost In Your Photo, "Asserting that a particular image must be paranormal because it is unexplained only constitutes an example of the logical fallacy called arguing from ignorance." They explain that the flash reflecting off a camera strap can produce a bright, white strand or a "spiralling vortex of spirit energy" depending upon the material the strap is made from. Other ghostly images can result from strands of hair, jewelry or flying insects. A flash illuminating a person's breath in cold weather, cigarette smoke or fog can look like "ectoplasmic mist". Long exposures, usually several seconds, can cause ethereal, see-through shapes or streaks of lines caused when the camera moves or if the object moves during the exposure.

Ben Radford, in his book "Big – If True: Adventures in Oddity" includes the phenomenon called pareidolia, the tendency for people to see faces or animals in things such as clouds, tree trunks or food, as an explanation for finding ghosts in photographs. Shadows from trees, uneven surfaces, reflections of light from water or glass can all make us see "faces". He notes that a ghost's elbow or foot is rarely reported.

=== Modern ghost photographs ===
In 2016, tourist Henry Yau took a picture of a staircase with a ghostly figure inside the Stanley Hotel in Colorado. The hotel is well known for its apparent hauntings. Several amateur ghost hunters believe the photo to be unexplainable and believe that a ghost or possibly two ghosts are at the top of the stairs. According to paranormal investigator Kenny Biddle, the "ghosts" could have been created because the camera was in panorama mode, which takes several seconds, and which can cause a double image from the longer exposure. Biddle believes that the image represents the same person moving on the stairs. Ben Radford indicates that the way the woman on the stairs is dressed and the location add to the possibility that people will jump to the conclusion that the paranormal is at work. He states "she seems to be wearing a classic black or dark dress (as befits a fancy, well-known hotel); had she been wearing a yellow blazer and carrying a large Target shopping bag speculations about her spectral origins would likely have been scuttled."

According to Biddle, author Tim Scullion claims that he has taken pictures of ghosts. Biddle explains that Scullion's ghosts are produced by using long exposures showing motion blur, light painting, dust particles catching light, lens flare, or by overlaying blurry faces on a night scene. This overlay was clearly evident due to the lack of image noise where the faces appear, compared to the rest of the photo.

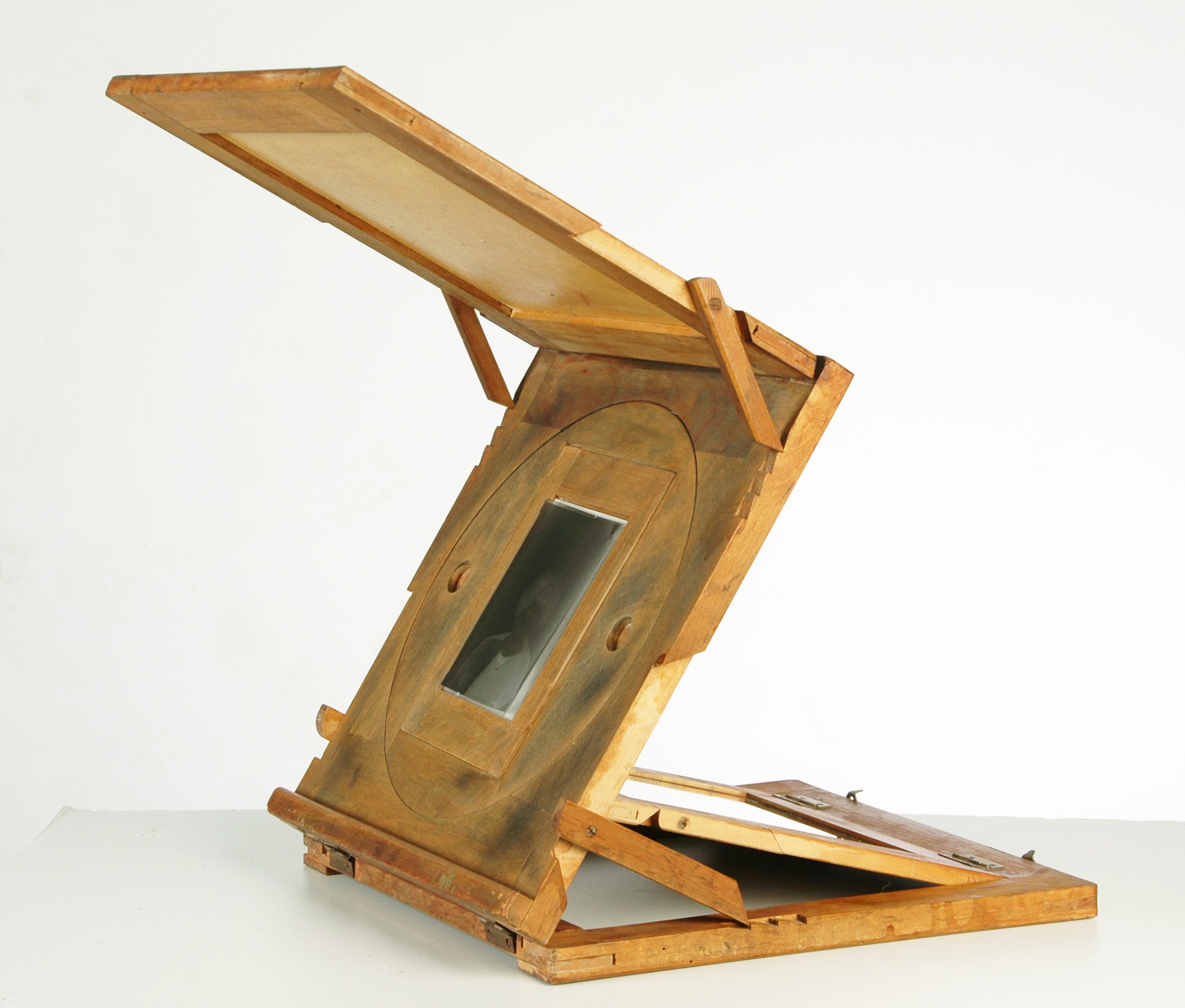
Retouching Desk circa 1870–1950

An old photograph taken in 1900 became popular within the paranormal community after it was posted on the website Belfast.co.uk in 2016 in a history section about old Belfast trades. The photo shows a group of Ulster girls from a linen factory. There is a mysterious, apparent ghostly hand sitting on the shoulder of one of the girls. The hand does not appear to belong to anyone in the picture. Biddle decided the photo was authentic and provides evidence that someone was most likely removed from the photo in his article The 'Ghost Hand' of 1900 in Skeptical Inquirer. He describes how retouching photos by hand using a retouching desk, cutting out objects and people, then filling them in with pencil or charcoal was not uncommon.

On August 18, 2020 a security firm received an alert at a construction site in Birmingham, England. On the monitor appeared the "ghostly" figure of a lone woman in a white dress walking across the property. The image went viral and appeared in many tabloids such as the Mirror. Adam Lees, the managing director of a security firm who received the alert, stated "She's leaning forward and seems to be floating, and is holding something in her hands. To me it looks like she is wearing a wedding dress like she's waiting to get married. She looks like a ghostly bride." Biddle noted some unusual things with the image. The camera level seemed too low for a security camera, there were no dates or times on the image as would normally be seen from security software, and the image was in colour except for the area around the woman. Biddle surmised that the camera was in an infrared night vision mode and a flash was fired, explaining the overexposure of the figure and the colour distortion. Biddle reached out to Stewart Chapman, who had installed a permanent closed-circuit television system above the other system, and had posted two screen shots of a girl in a red dress showing it was not a ghost on the property but a drunken girl and her friend.

=== Ghost camera apps ===
Smartphone applications that place images of ghosts, aliens and monsters into actual pictures have been used for pranks or to try to fool people into thinking they are real images of ghosts. The apps are customizable allowing the user to place the ghost anywhere within a photo, rotate it, adjust its transparency, and erase parts. In 2014, there were over 250 ghost related applications for Android phones, one of the most popular being GhostCam: Spirit Photography. This app was used in a hoax that was used to generate publicity. The group named Ghosts of New England Research Society began publishing hoaxed ghost photos as authentic, hoping to promote an episode of Discovery Channel's American Haunting that the group appeared in. The photo showed a ghostly figure in a restaurant. Biddle spotted the forgery on Facebook and noticed that the "ghost" looked like a well documented photo called The Madonna of Bachelor's Grove taken by the Ghost Research Society in 1991. It is unclear if the Ghosts of New England Research Society posted the photos knowing they were hoaxes or if they were fooled by the restaurant owner who sent them the photo. It was determined that the app was using The Madonna of Bachelor's Grove without permission and was removed after this incident.

Another app called Ghost Camera Prank was used by a ghost tour group Facebook page, claiming a client had taken it. Tkay Anderson, co-founder of the Facebook page There's a (ghost) App For That was able to find the specific ghost used in the faked photo. Other clues were that the "ghost" was sharper than the rest of the picture, the ghost was black and white while the rest of the picture was in colour and the ghost was calculated to be about 11 feet tall.

As of 2018, the appeal and novelty of the ghost cam apps have begun to wear off, although there are still people who will attempt to pass off the results of these apps as authentic. Pranksters will try to fool their friends or families but sometimes the prank can go too far when their targets believe the hoax is true. Others, such as the owners of pubs, hotels or ghost hunting tours will try to profit from the photos by increasing their clientele or raising their prices.

== See also ==
- Kirlian photography
- Hidden mother photography
- Spiritualist art
- Thoughtography
