= Institut Métapsychique International =

The Institut Métapsychique International (IMI) is a French parapsychological organization that studies paranormal phenomena. It was created in 1919 by Jean Meyer, Gustav Geley and Professor Rocco Santoliquido.

Notable past presidents have included Charles Richet (1930-1935) and René Warcollier (1950-1962). Eugéne Osty served as a director (1925-1938).
