= G. E. Richards =

Rear-Admiral G. E. Richards
- Military career
- Allegiance: United Kingdom
- Branch: Royal Navy
- Commands: HMS Renard; HMQS Paluma; HMS Rambler; HMS Alacrity

Rear-Admiral George Edward Richards (1852–1927) was a British naval officer and hydrographer. He commanded the survey ship HMQS Paluma which in the late 19th century surveyed the Great Barrier Reef in Queensland, Australia. Richards served aboard the schooner Renard in 1878, and HMQS Paluma in 1887. He was commanding officer of HMS Rambler surveying the Strait of Belle Isle in 1897.

== Early life ==
He was the eldest son of Sir George Richards, Hydrographer of the Royal Navy.

On 5 January 1879 he married Emily Rose, the youngest daughter of John de Courcey Bremer, of Rose Bay, Sydney.

== Naval career ==
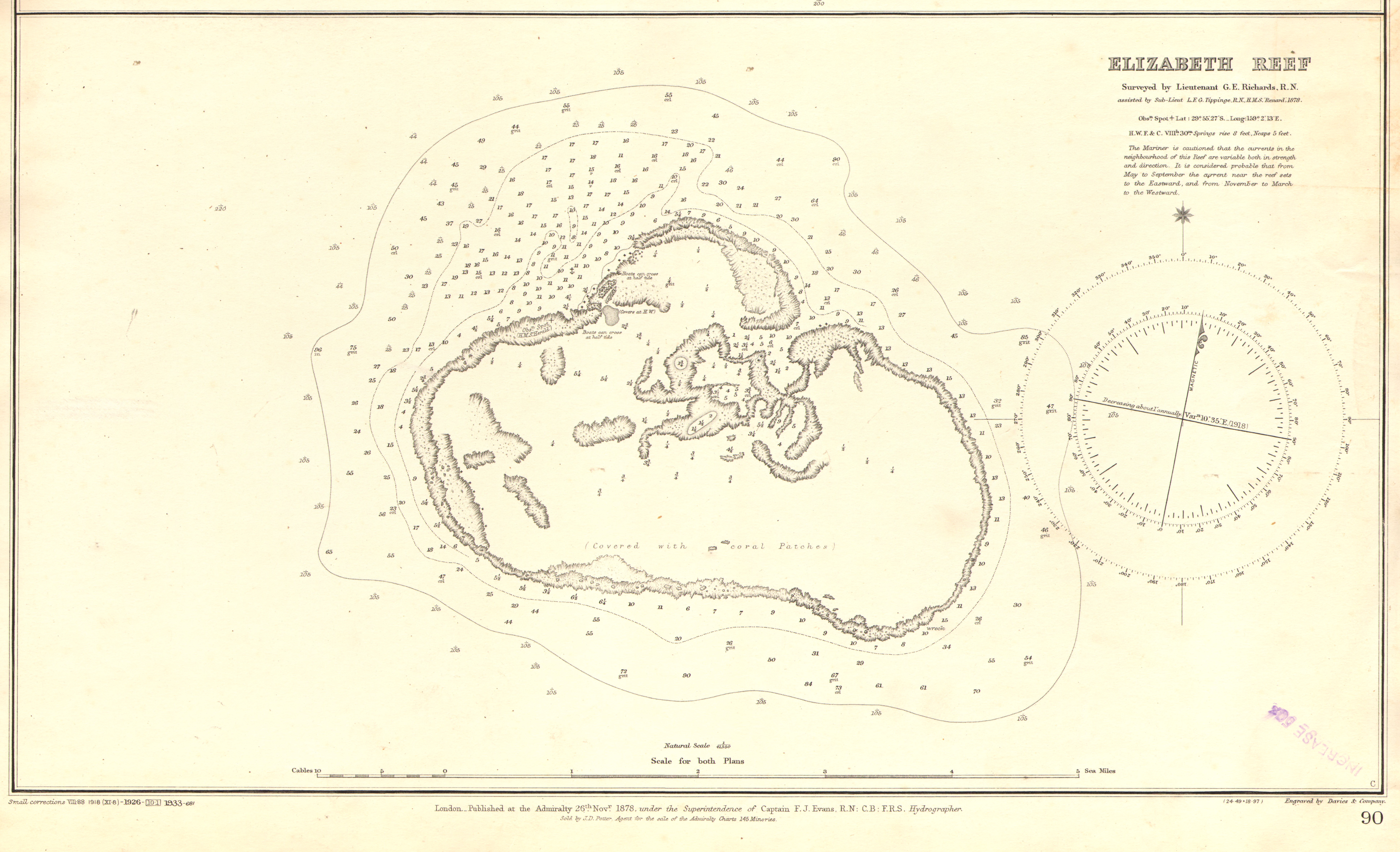
Admiralty Chart of Elizabeth Reef in the Coral Sea, surveyed by Richards and Tippinge in 1878

He was a sub-lieutenant aboard HMS Wolverine (2,431 tons) when it reached Brisbane in August 1877.

While in command of Renard (1878–84) he surveyed the Russell Islands, Rendova Island, part of New Georgia and Pocklington Reef. He also surveyed the Duke of York Islands. The Indispensable Reefs and Bampton Reefs were also visited.

He later commanded HMS Alacrity (1881–82) on hydrographic voyages along the coast of Queensland north of Hinchinbrook Island.

The 1887 voyage named the following places:

- Cid Harbour 1887
- Orpheus Island 1887
- Pioneer Bay
- Acacia Island
- Mausoleum Island
- Combe Island
- Paluma Rock in the Palm Islands

He was later in command of the surveying ship HMS Triton from March 1893 to July 1894, and again from February 1899 to March 1902.

Captain Richards was placed on the retired list, at his own request, in December 1902. He was promoted to rear-admiral on the Retired list on 1 July 1907.

He died in December 1927.

== Legacy ==
He compiled the first volume of, Pacific Islands ... sailing directions (1885).

He was a birdwatcher and collector and a number of tropical birds are named after him.
