= William Usborne Moore =

British naval commander, researcher and spiritualist

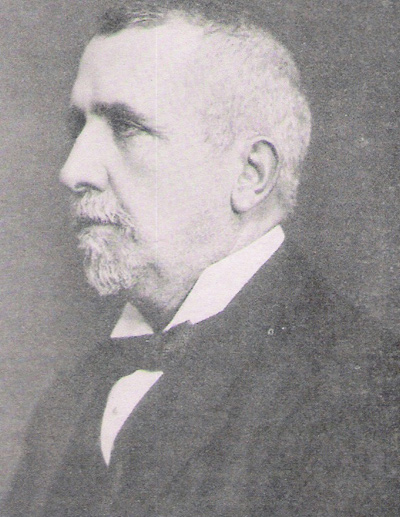
- Born: March 8, 1849
- Died: March 15, 1918 (aged 69)
- Occupations: Naval surveyor, spiritualist

Vice admiral William Usborne Moore (March 8, 1849 – March 15, 1918) also known as W. Usborne Moore was a British naval commander, psychical researcher and spiritualist.

== Career ==
Moore worked as a naval surveyor, serving in Fiji and the SW Pacific in HMS Alacrity and HMS Dart between 1876 and 1885; in China with HMS Rambler between 1885 and 1889; in Australia with HMS Penguin between 1889 and 1893; and in home waters with HMS Research between 1895 and 1900. In 1877, he married Maria Gertrude in Sydney, New South Wales.

In the South China Sea, Moore and Percy Bassett-Smith, the surgeon of HMS Rambler, spent a week on a scientific survey of the Tizard and Macclesfield Banks. This work was carried out at the request of Captain Wharton, Hydrographer of the Navy, who was a member of the Coral Reef Committee of the Royal Society. They ran sections to determine the shapes of the reefs, and dredged to establish the type of coral growing, and the depths at which live coral could be found. Later that year, while surveying the Zhoushan Archipelago and Hangzhou Bay in 1888, Moore took time to investigate the tidal bore of the Qiantang River, the largest in the world. He provided the first detailed description of the bore by a western observer. On a subsequent visit, he was able to obtain photographs of the bore.

Moore continued to pursue the scientific opportunities presented by surveying voyages on his next command, HMS Penguin. Bassett-Smith was again appointed surgeon, and the engineer was J.J. Walker an established entomologist. Between 1890 and 1893 they collected widely, providing the material for a series of published papers.

Admiralty Chart showing Zhoushan and the mouths of the Yangtze River, surveyed by Moore in HMS Rambler and Penguin in 1887–1892

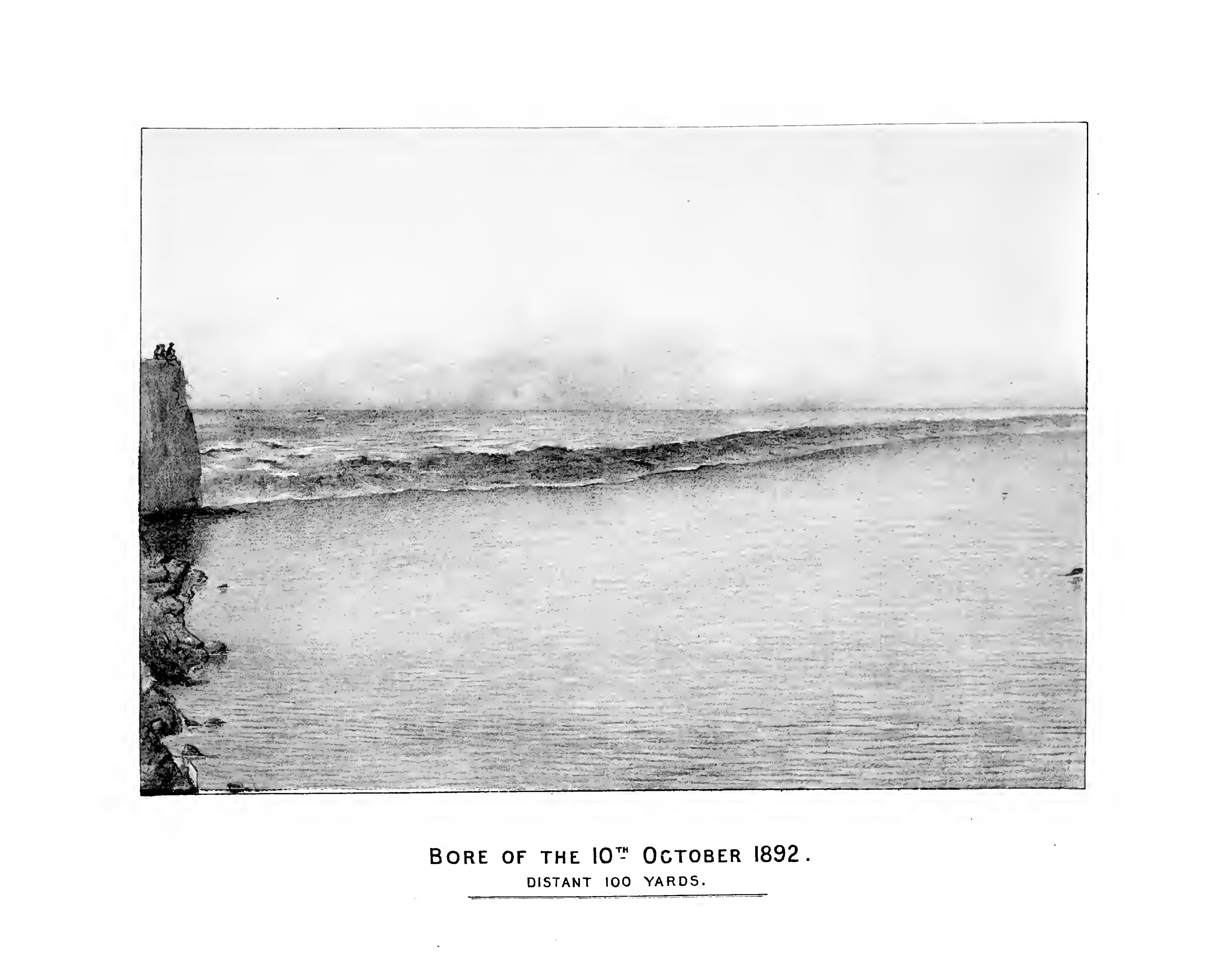
Tidal bore of the Tsien-tang-kiang (Qiantang River) in 1892

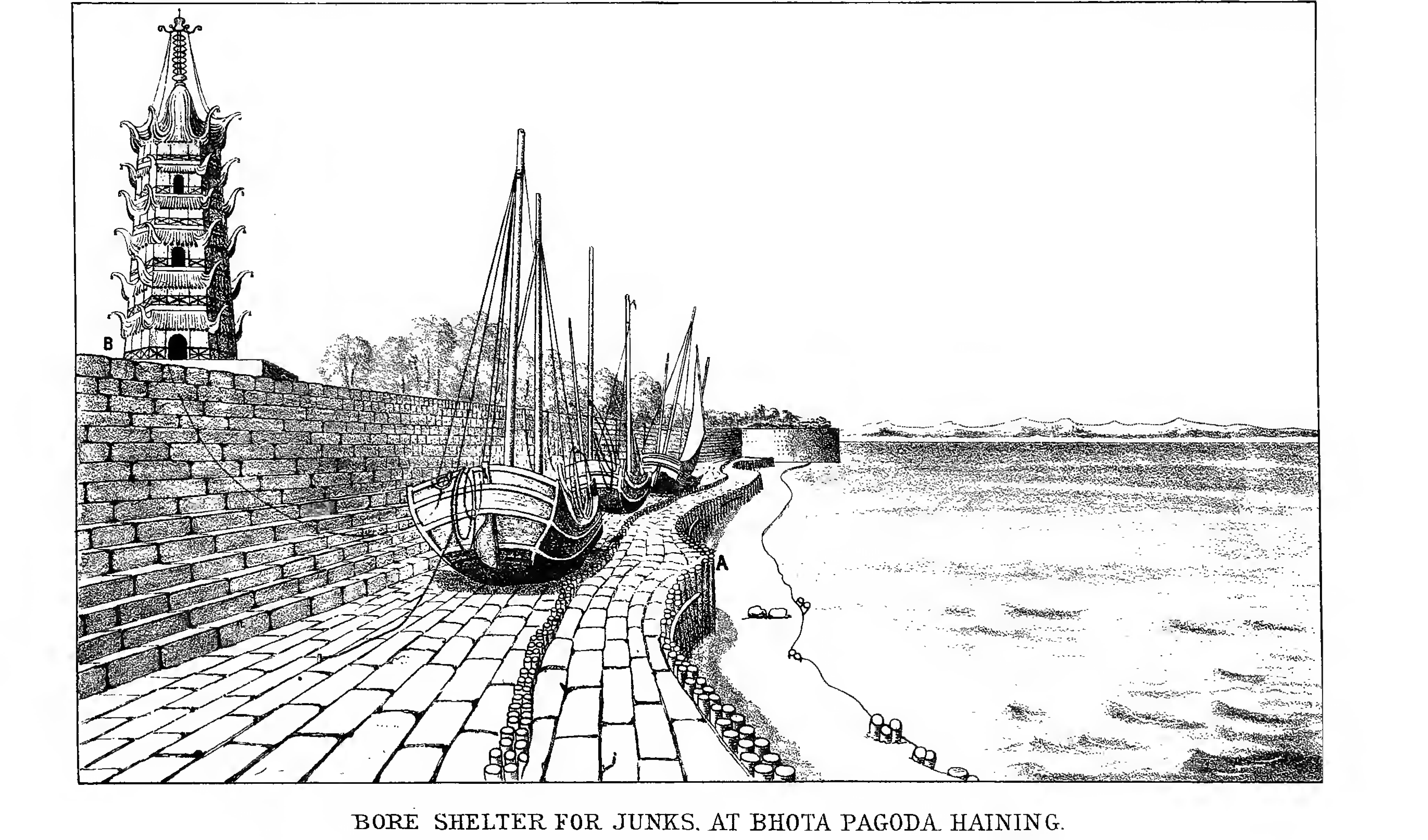
Bore shelter for junks at Bhota Pagoda, Haining, on the Qiantang River

== Spiritualism ==
Moore retired in 1904 with the rank of Rear-Admiral. He developed an interest in spiritualism and had a long history of defending fraudulent mediums as genuine. He endorsed the direct voice medium Etta Wriedt. He defended the Bangs Sisters and even stated that the psychical investigator Hereward Carrington had never visited their house or exposed their tricks. After Carrington gave incontrovertible evidence that he had visited their house and caught them in fraud, Moore had to retract his charges.

In 1906, Moore attended a séance with the British materialization medium Frederick G. Foster Craddock. A small electric torch used to produce 'spirit' lights was discovered in a drawer during a séance by Moore. Despite admitting the fraud of the incident, Moore still endorsed the mediumship of Craddock, stating that his trance control "Graem" was a malicious spirit.

Moore also endorsed the American materialization medium Joseph Jonson from Toledo, Ohio. He claimed to have observed materialized spirits emerge from the cabinet during a séance in his book Glimpses of the Next State (1911). Jonson was later exposed as a fraud by James Hewat McKenzie who discovered that Jonson's daughter had dressed up as a spirit. In 1907, Hereward Carrington attended séances with Jonson at Lily Dale, New York and concluded "on several occasions, the fraud was very apparent, and that I was enabled to follow the process of materialisation and dematerialisation with ease. Everything was the most obvious and simple trickery, and seen to be such."

The spiritualist Arthur Conan Doyle described Moore as "among the greatest of psychic researchers". However, Moore was heavily criticized by psychical researchers. Science historian William Hodson Brock has described Moore as a "credulous spiritualist".

== Publications ==
- The Cosmos and the Creeds: Elementary Notes on the Alleged Finality of the Christian Faith (1903)
- Glimpses of the Next State (1911)
- The Voices (1913)
- Spirit Identity by the Direct Voice (1914)
