= Rambler =

Rambler or Ramble may refer to:

== Places ==
- Rambler, Wyoming
- Rambler Channel (藍巴勒海峽), separates Tsing Yi Island and the mainland New Territories in Hong Kong
- The Ramble and Lake, Central Park, an area within New York City's Central Park

== Music ==
- Rambler (Bill Frisell album), a 1985 album by guitarist Bill Frisell
- Rambler (Gábor Szabó album), a 1973 album by guitarist Gábor Szabó
- The Rambler (album), a 1977 album by Johnny Cash
- The Ramblers (band), long-running Dutch jazz ensemble
- The Ramblers, one-time backing band of Perry Como (notably on "Don't Let the Stars Get in Your Eyes")
- The Ramblers (choir), a UK school choir who had a hit single with "The Sparrow" in 1979

== Organizations ==
- The Ramblers, a British charity for recreational walkers
- Loyola Ramblers, the varsity sports teams of Loyola University Chicago

== People ==
- RJD2 (born 1976), American producer, singer and musician whose full name is Ramble John "RJ" Krohn
- Charles Ramble (born 1957), anthropologist and university lecturer

== Publications ==
- The Rambler (1750–52), an essay series published by Edward Cave, mostly written by Samuel Johnson
- The Rambler (Catholic periodical) (1848–62), a Catholic magazine, founded by converts and edited by Cardinal Newman

== Transport ==
- Rambler (automobile) and Nash Rambler, American automobile brands made by Thomas B. Jeffery Company (1900–1914), Nash Motors (1950–1957), and AMC (1958–1969)
- Holiday Rambler, an American manufacturer of recreational vehicles
- HMS Rambler, four ships of the Royal Navy
- Rambler 100, a racing yacht that capsized in the Fastnet Race on 15 August 2011
- Rambler (yacht), a 2002 yacht
- Rambler (bicycle), a turn-of-the-century American bicycle

== Others ==
- Rambler (portal), a Russian search engine and Web portal similar to Yahoo!
- The Rambler (film), a 2013 American horror film
- Rambler Rose, a species of rose native to eastern Asia, in China, Japan, and Korea
- Rambling, walking in the United Kingdom
- Ranch-style house or rambler
