= Herbert Purey-Cust =

British hydrographer and Royal Navy Admiral (1857–1938)

Admiral Sir Herbert Purey-Cust KBE CB
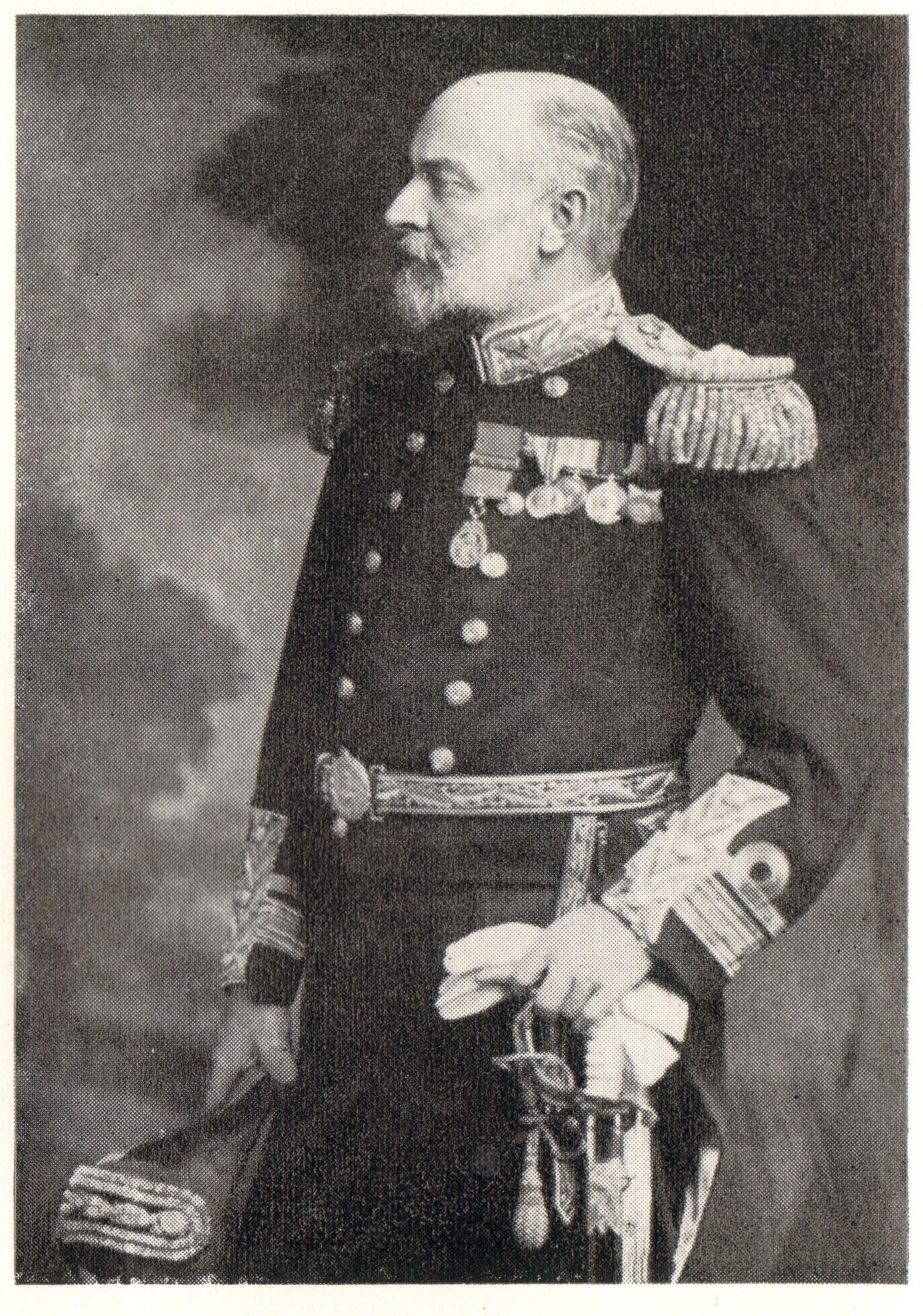
- Born: 26 February 1857
- Died: 11 November 1938 (aged 81) Highgate
- Allegiance: United Kingdom
- Branch: Royal Navy
- Service years: 1870-1919
- Rank: Admiral
- Office: Hydrographer of the Navy
- Term: 1909-1914

Sir Herbert Edward Purey-Cust, KBE, CB (26 February 1857 – 11 November 1938) was an officer in the Royal Navy and Hydrographer of the Navy from 1909 to 1914.

== Early life to 1891 ==
Herbert Purey-Cust was born on 26 February 1857. He was the second son of Arthur Purey-Cust, Dean of York and Lady Emma Bligh, daughter of the 5th Earl of Darnley. He joined the Royal Navy in 1870, and was promoted to sub-lieutenant in 1876. He served in HMS Newcastle in China, HMS Squirrel in Devonport, and HMS Valiant in the channel squadron. He was promoted to lieutenant in 1878.

Purey-Cust began to specialise in surveying in 1881, working for two years on HMS Fawn, commanded by Pelham Aldrich, in the Red Sea and East Africa. In 1884 he took a surveying course at Greenwich, for which he received a £100 prize for General Proficiency and then spent four years with HMS Rambler surveying in China, firstly under F.C.P. Vereker, and then under William Usborne Moore. While travelling out to China, Rambler was engaged in military operations in Sudan. For his part, Purey-Cust was awarded the Egyptian Medal and the Khedive's Bronze Star. He then spent three years on HMS Egeria, first under C.F. Oldham in the Pacific, and then under Arthur Mostyn Field in North Borneo and the Anambas Islands. While travelling from Plymouth to Sydney in 1889, he observed migrating swallows off the coast of Senegal, which settled on the ship for a while before resuming their journey. He wrote a short note on the encounter for Nature.

== Command at sea, 1892–1909 ==
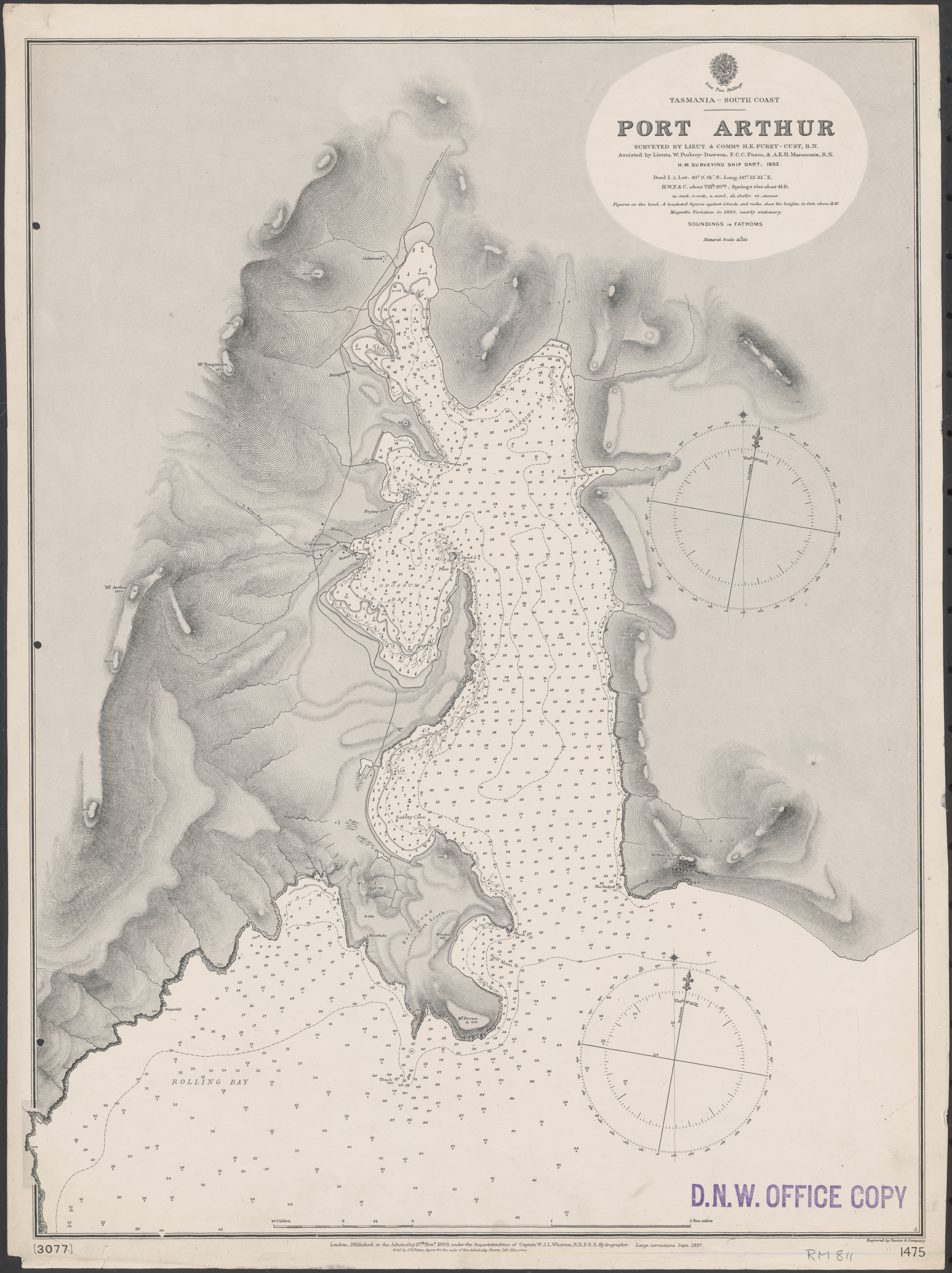
Admiralty Chart of Port Arthur, Tasmania, surveyed by Purey-Cust in 1893

Purey-Cust's first command was HMS Dart, based in Australia from 1892. He was promoted to Commander in 1894. While surveying in the New Hebrides, now Vanuatu, there was a major volcanic eruption on the island of Ambrym. Survey work was interrupted, and Dart helped to provide assistance to the islanders. Purey-Cust published an account of his observations of the eruption. He then returned to England, and spent two years as a naval assistant in the Hydrographic Department before re-joining Rambler in 1897, this time in command. Surveys were carried out over a wide area, including the West Indies, Africa, and the Red Sea. He was promoted to captain in 1900.

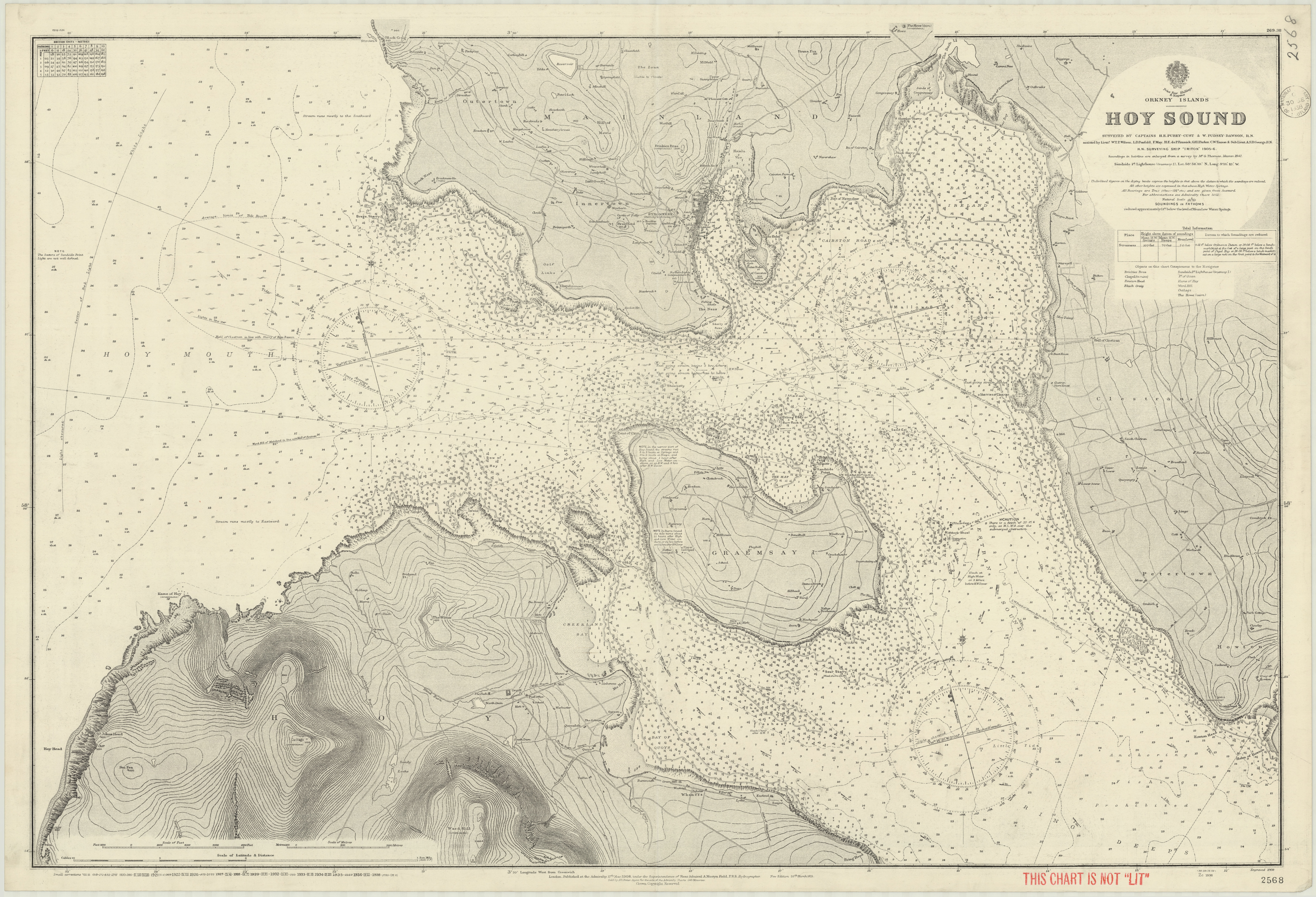
Admiralty Chart of Hoy Sound, Orkney, surveyed by Purey-Cust in 1905-6

Purey-Cost's final command, from 1902 to 1905, was HMS Triton, a paddle surveying ship. The surveys in home waters included the channels in the Thames estuary, tidal observations in the North Sea, sea lochs in the west of Scotland and the Orkney Islands. The last would become of particular importance, given the importance of Orkney for naval operations in World War I.

== Hydrographer 1909–1914 ==
In April 1907, Purey-Cust was appointed Assistant Hydrographer, and in 1909 he became Hydrographer of the Navy. His period in office, ending in August 1914, was dominated by deteriorating relations with Germany, and the resulting shift in naval focus towards the North Sea. The survey fleet was augmented, with the re-commissioning of HMS Hearty as a survey vessel in 1910, and the construction of two trawler-type ships, Daisy and Esther, and HMS Endeavour, an ocean-going survey vessel in 1912. Several cruisers were also allocated as support vessels. Surveys were carried out off the south coast of England, in the southern North Sea, an area characterised by shifting sandbanks, the Firth of Forth, and in Orkney and Shetland. Survey work continued overseas during this period Purey-Cust was much involved in the organization of the department, and favoured separating Navigation from a sub-Department to a department reporting directly to the Admiralty Board. This was finally agreed to in 1913. Chart production was another concern. During Purey-Cust's term the number of charts was reduced, in some cases by increasing size, sizes were standardised, and the number of different scales used was reduced. The arrangements for preparing and issuing Sailing Directions and Tide Tables were also updated. Purey-Cust was elected a Fellow of the Royal Astronomical Society in 1910, was promoted to rear-admiral in the same year, and made C.B. in 1911.

== Later life and family ==
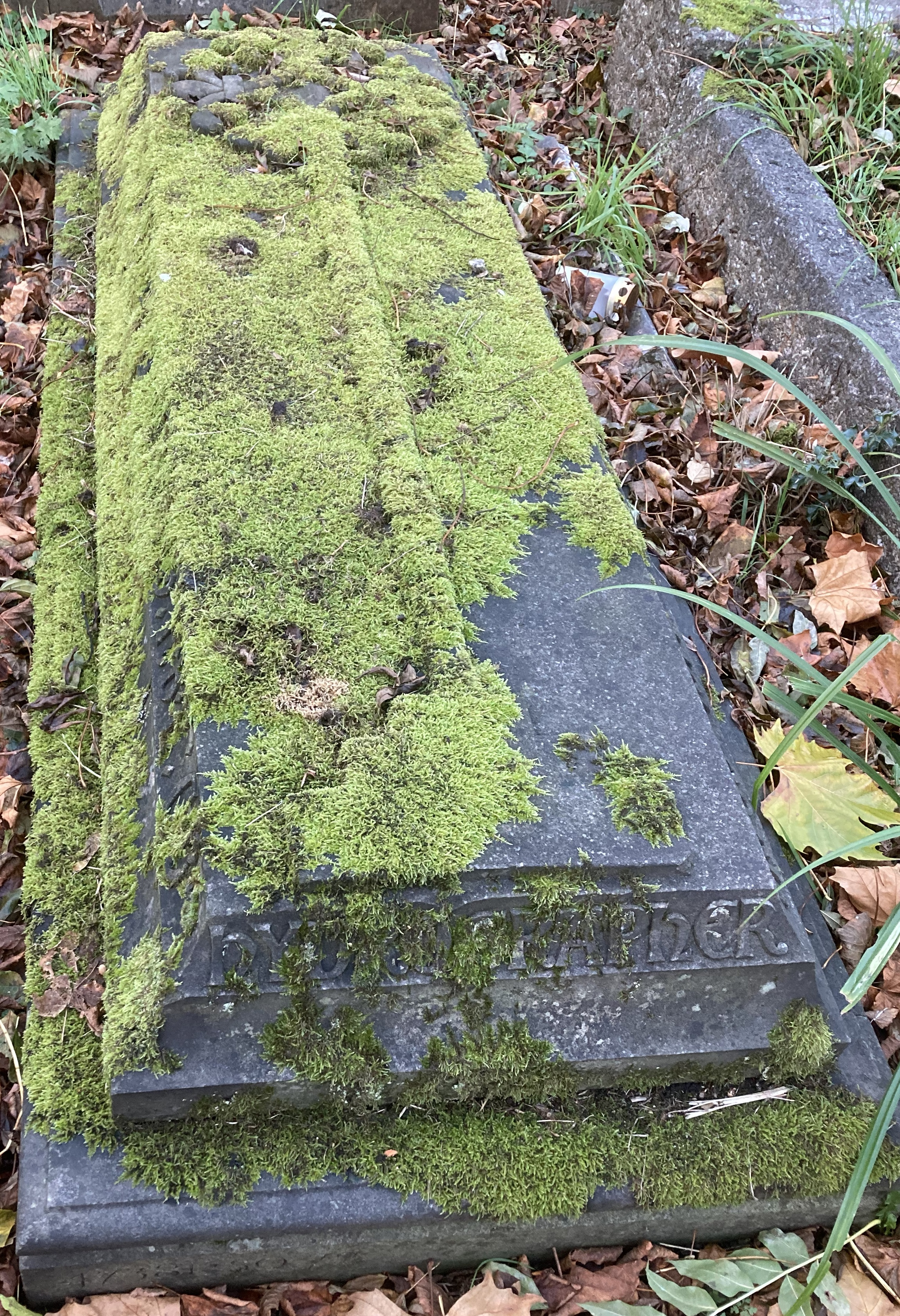
Grave of Herbert Purey-Cust in Highgate Cemetery

Purey-Cust's term as hydrographer ended on 31 August 1914. During the war he was a captain in the Royal Naval Reserve, commanding the depot ship Zaria. He was promoted to vice-admiral in 1915, and to admiral in 1919, when he retired. He was made K.B.E. in the same year. He had married Alice Ella Hepburn (died 1949) while in Australia, in 1895. They had two children, a son, Arthur John, a naval sub-lieutenant, who was killed in the war, and a daughter Marjorie. He died in Highgate on 11 November 1938 and was buried in Highgate Cemetery.

== Technical developments ==
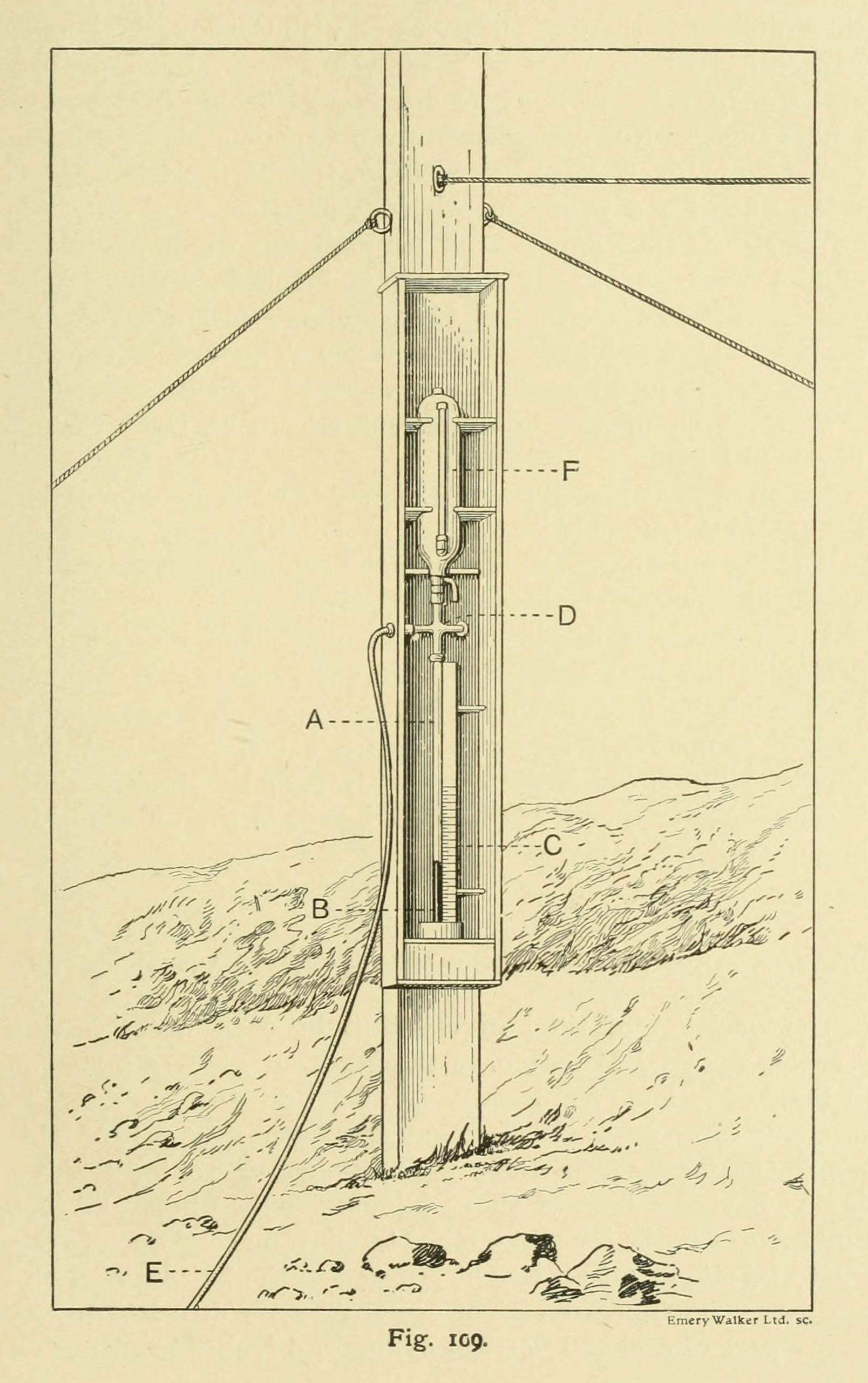
Purey-Cust's vacuum tide gauge. The end of tube E is in the ocean, and a vacuum is maintained in the tube. The tidal height is balanced by the height of mercury in the barometer tube.

Purey-Cust designed a number of aids to surveying, including:

- Station pointer, instrument for determining position from angles to known objects
- Tables for determining height from angle and distance
- Star charts for selecting pairs of stars for latitude determination (together with Boyle Somerville)
- Vacuum tide gauge, allowing determinations of tide level to be made at some distance from the sea

H.P. Douglas notes in his 1939 obituary that several of these were still in use at the time of writing.
