= HMS Rambler =

Four ships of the Royal Navy have borne the name HMS Rambler:

- HMS Rambler (1778) was a 10-gun cutter purchased in 1778. She sank in 1785 but was raised and refitted, and sold in 1787.
- HMS Rambler (1796) was a 14-gun brig-sloop, previously a cutter, purchased in 1796. She was sold in 1816.
- HMS Rambler (1856) was a Cheerful-class wooden screw gunboat built as HMS Ramble but renamed in 1855 and launched in 1856. She was broken up in 1869.
- HMS Rambler (1880) was an Algerine-class gunvessel launched in 1880. She was converted to a survey vessel in 1884 and was sold in 1907.
