= Guy Wyatt =

British navy officer (1893–1982)

Vice-Admiral Sir Guy Wyatt KBE CB
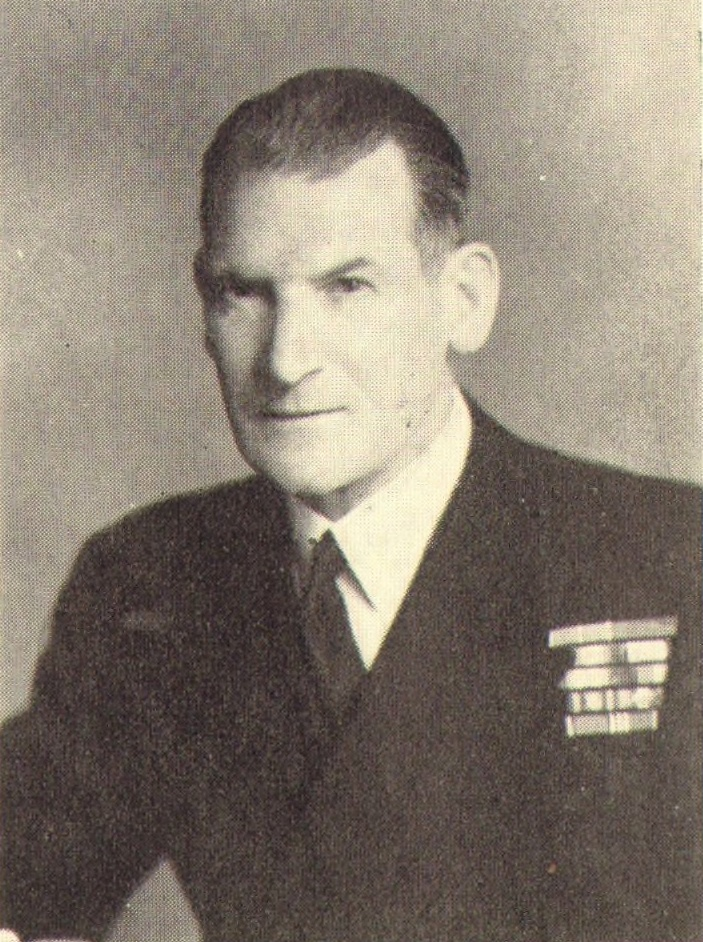
- Born: 1893
- Died: 1982 (aged 88–89)
- Military career
- Allegiance: United Kingdom
- Branch: Royal Navy
- Service years: 1910-1960
- Rank: Vice-Admiral
- Office: Hydrographer of the Navy
- Term: 1945-1950

Sir Arthur Guy Norris Wyatt KBE CB (1893-1982) was a Royal Navy Officer and Surveyor who was Hydrographer of the Navy in 1945–1950.

Wyatt was born in 1893. His father was Arthur Norris Wyatt. In 1910, as a naval cadet, he was awarded the Royal Humane Society's bronze medal for saving life from drowning. Later that year he was promoted to midshipman. During World War I he was active in the Grand Fleet and the Dover Patrol, being promoted to Lieutenant in 1915. In 1918 he was in command of HMS Beagle, a destroyer engaged in anti-submarine and escort duty.

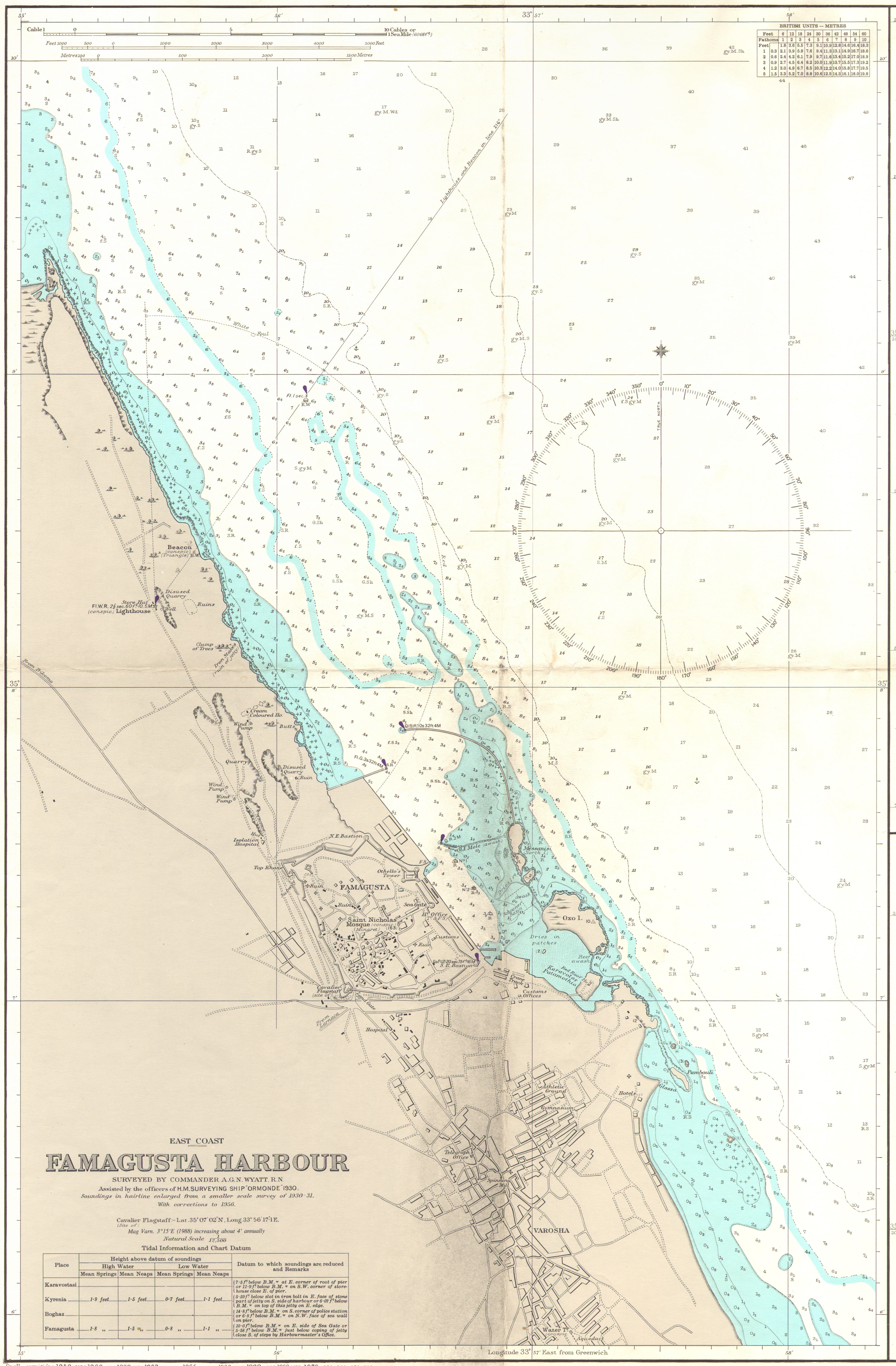
Admiralty chart of Famagusta Harbour, Cyprus, from Wyatt's 1930 survey in HMS Ormonde

From 1919 to 1926 Wyatt was engaged in surveying, mainly in Australia and the Torres Strait, with a period working on the east coast of England and the Thames Estuary. In 1922 he married the Australian actress Tien Hogue. In 1926 he took command of HMS Ormonde surveying in British Guiana and then worked in home waters for two years in HMS Beaufort. He was promoted to Commander in 1929 and again took command of Ormonde for surveying work in the Persian Gulf and Cyprus.

In 1932–1934 Wyatt commanded HMS Challenger, surveying the coast of Labrador, and working in the West Indies in the winter. He published a detailed account of the surveying work in Labrador, in a largely uncharted area with many islands and rocky narrow channels, frequent fog, and icebergs. Peparing a baseline for triangulation involved considerable levelling and infilling of swamp, releasing mosquitoes so numerous that they covered large areas of the men's bodies. On one occasion (23 Sep 1932) the ship struck a pinnacle rock, and was only refloated with difficulty. At the end of the 1934 season a winter party was left behind to continue land-based surveying.

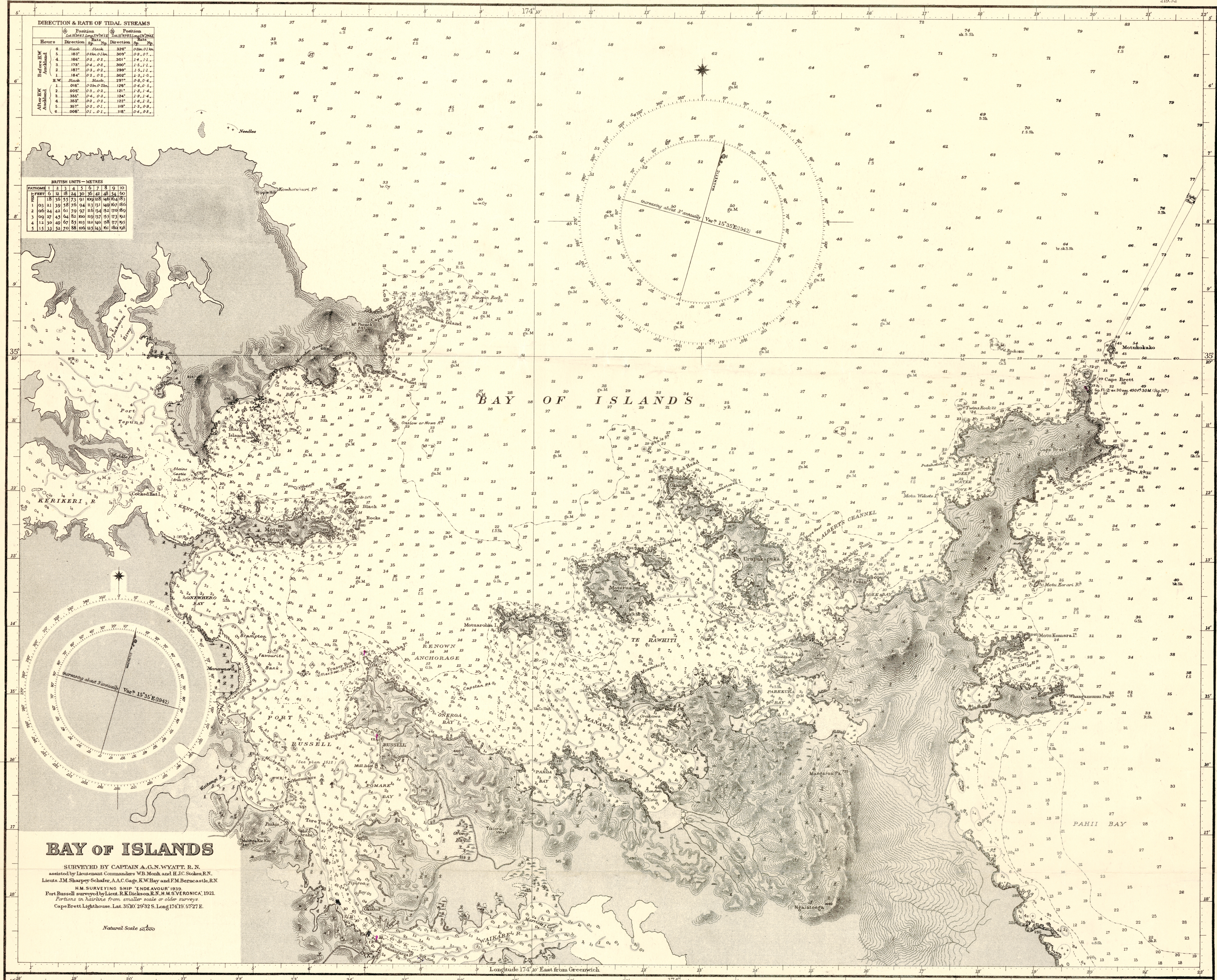
Admiralty Chart of Bay of Islands from Wyatt's New Zealand Survey in HMS Endeavour, 1939

From 1935 to 1937 Wyatt was Superintendent of Charts at the Hydrographic Office. From 1937 until the outbreak of war in 1939 he commanded HMS Endeavour, surveying in New Zealand waters. He was promoted to the rank of Captain on 30 June 1938. In 1940, he became Assistant Hydrographer under John Edgell, and in 1942 was again in command of Challenger supporting the Eastern Fleet. The ship carried printing equipment so that charts created from surveys could be produced locally. Wyatt set up facilities for creating and printing charts at Mombasa, Dehra Dun and Colombo. In 1944 he was back in the Torres Strait surveying and sweeping a path for the Pacific Fleet.

In 1945 he became Hydrographer to the Navy, supervising the return of the office to peacetime duties. He was promoted to Rear-Admiral in 1945, awarded the CB in 1948 and made KBE in 1949. He retired with the rank of vice admiral in 1950. He and Tien lived in Tasmania in retirement until their deaths. She died in 1962, he in 1982.
