= Wharton, Western Australia =

Town in the Shire of Esperance, Western Australia

Wharton
- Town
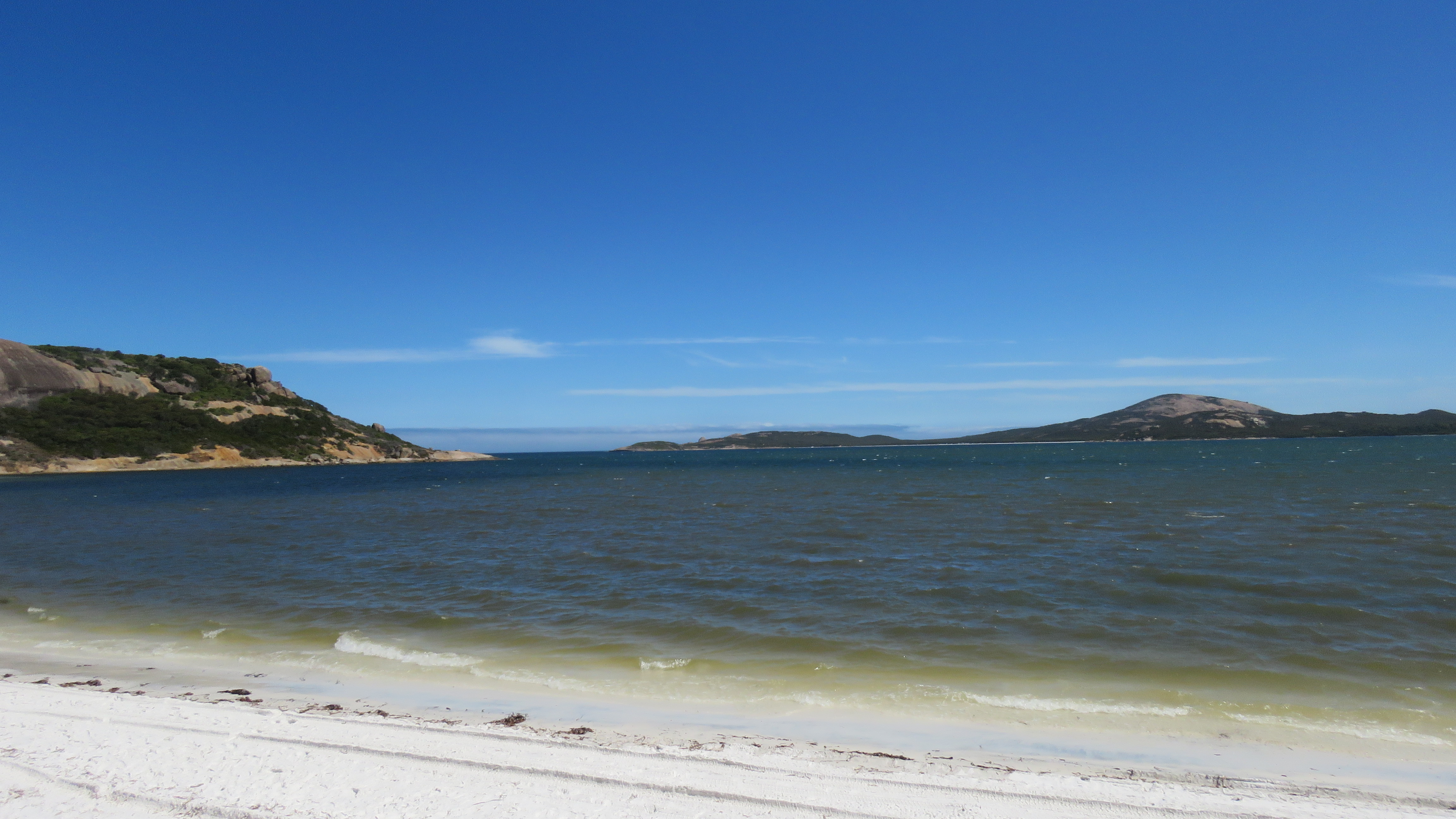
- Duke of Orleans Bay

- Interactive map of Wharton
- Coordinates: 33.92400°S 122.57877°E
- Country: Australia
- State: Western Australia
- LGA: Shire of Esperance
- Location: 664 km (413 mi) SE of Perth; 206 km (128 mi) SE of Norseman; 64 km (40 mi) E of Esperance
- Established: 1964

Government
  - State electorate: Roe
  - Federal division: O'Connor

Area
  - Total: 0.15 km^{2} (0.058 sq mi)
- Postcode: 6450

Wharton is a town in the Shire of Esperance in the Goldfields-Esperance region of Western Australia. It is situated within the locality of Condingup, on the Duke of Orleans Bay, on the coast of the Southern Ocean. The townsite is split into two distinct areas. The larger northern part is taken up by the Duke of Orleans Bay Caravan Park, while the smaller southern part is an undeveloped site by the beach.

The area around the Duke of Orleans Bay was set aside as a recreation reserve in 1882. This recreation reserve was enlarged in 1903 and, again, in the late 1950s. In 1964, a townsite was gazetted at Wharton but the site's only development were a caravan park, a golf course and an area for camping. The town has been named after the nearby Wharton Island which, in turn, was named after William Wharton, a British admiral and Hydrographer of the Navy.

Wharton Beach and Little Wharton Beach are located on the opposite side of the peninsular the townsite is on and connected to it through Wharton Road. The eastern boundary of Cape Le Grand National Park runs through Wharton Beach, 2.5 kilometres (1.6 mi) west of Wharton, while most of the islands off the coast of Wharton belong to the Recherche Archipelago Nature Reserve.
