= Pocklington Reef =

Coral reef in Milne Bay Province, Papua New Guinea

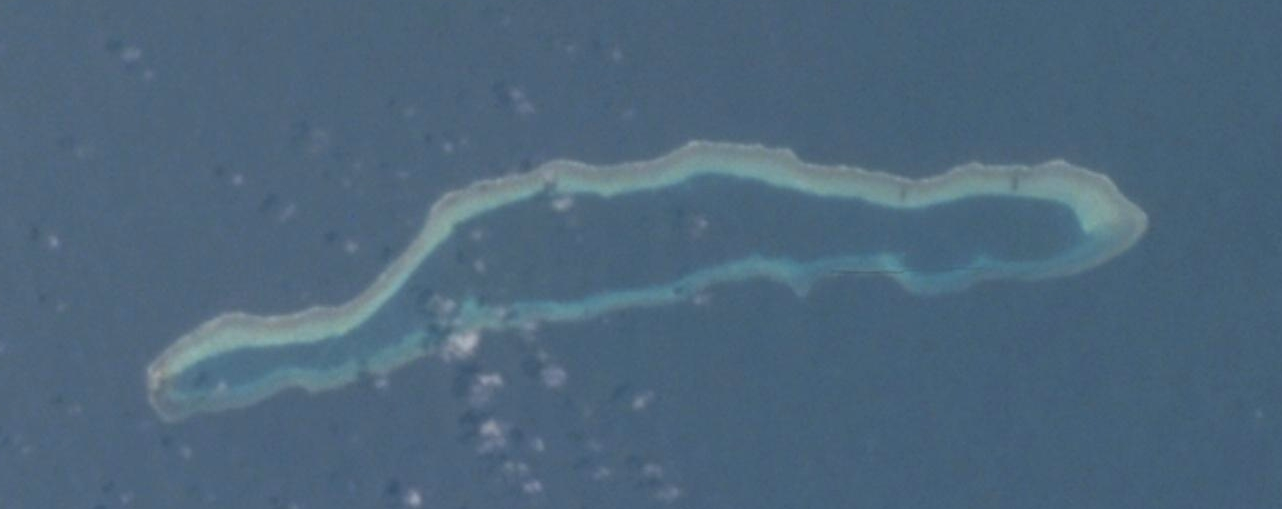
- ISS image of Pocklington Reef

- Location within Papua New Guinea

Geography
- Location: Solomon Sea
- Coordinates: 10°48′44″S 155°44′18″E
- Type: Reef
- Archipelago: Louisiade Archipelago
- Adjacent to: Solomon Sea
- Total islands: 2 inhabited on Bentley Group
- Major islands: North islet
- Area: 0.01 km^{2} (0.0039 sq mi)
- Highest elevation: 1 m (3 ft)

Administration
- Papua New Guinea
- Province: Milne Bay
- District: Samarai-Murua District
- LLG: Yaleyamba Rural Local Level Government Area

Demographics
- Population: 0 (2014)
- Pop. density: 0/km^{2} (0/sq mi)

Additional information
- Time zone: AEST (UTC+10)
- ISO code: PG-MBA
- Official website: www.ncdc.gov.pg

Pocklington Reef is a coral reef and a mostly submerged atoll in the far southeast of Papua New Guinea.

It is 162.4 km (100.9 mi) from the closest island, Loa Boloba, which is a tiny coral islet within the fringing reef near Cape Deliverance, the south east point of Rossel Island (Yela) in the Louisiade Archipelago, and belongs to Milne Bay province, Samarai-Murua District, Yaleyamba Rural Local Level Government Area.

Pocklington Reef sits on top of Pocklington Ridge, which extends north-east from Rossel Island. The reef is 32 km (20 mi) long and up to 4 km (2.5 mi) wide. Its longer axis is north-east-south-west. The rim of the reef encloses a deep lagoon. The northern rim reaches closer to the surface, and several above water rocks with heights between 0.9 and 3 m (2 ft 11 in and 9 ft 10 in) high lie along its length. There is a small spit of sand about the size of a football field (less than one hectare or 2.5 acres) at the north-east end.

It is isolated from other reef systems by deep water and relatively pristine.

Before Papua New Guinea achieved sovereignty in 1975 it was decided Pocklington Reef should be part of the new nation.

== History ==
The reef was discovered and named by the captain of the Sydney whaler Pocklington in 1825.

HMS Renard under the command of Lieutenant G.E. Richards surveyed the reef in 1880 and noted there was no anchorage around its perimeter.

On 28 April 1962, the Panamanian vessel SS Dona Ourania (8,716 tons) grounded on Pocklington Reef.

In April 1974 the Soviet vessel Fedor Litke spent a week at a sandbank on the reef. An Australian naval vessel visited the site soon after and it was reported a concealed electronic monitoring device was found there.

Illegal drugs worth $30 million were hidden in a wreck on the reef in 1978. Stored in watertight bags, the cannabis had been left by a trawler from Thailand.

=== Shipwrecks ===
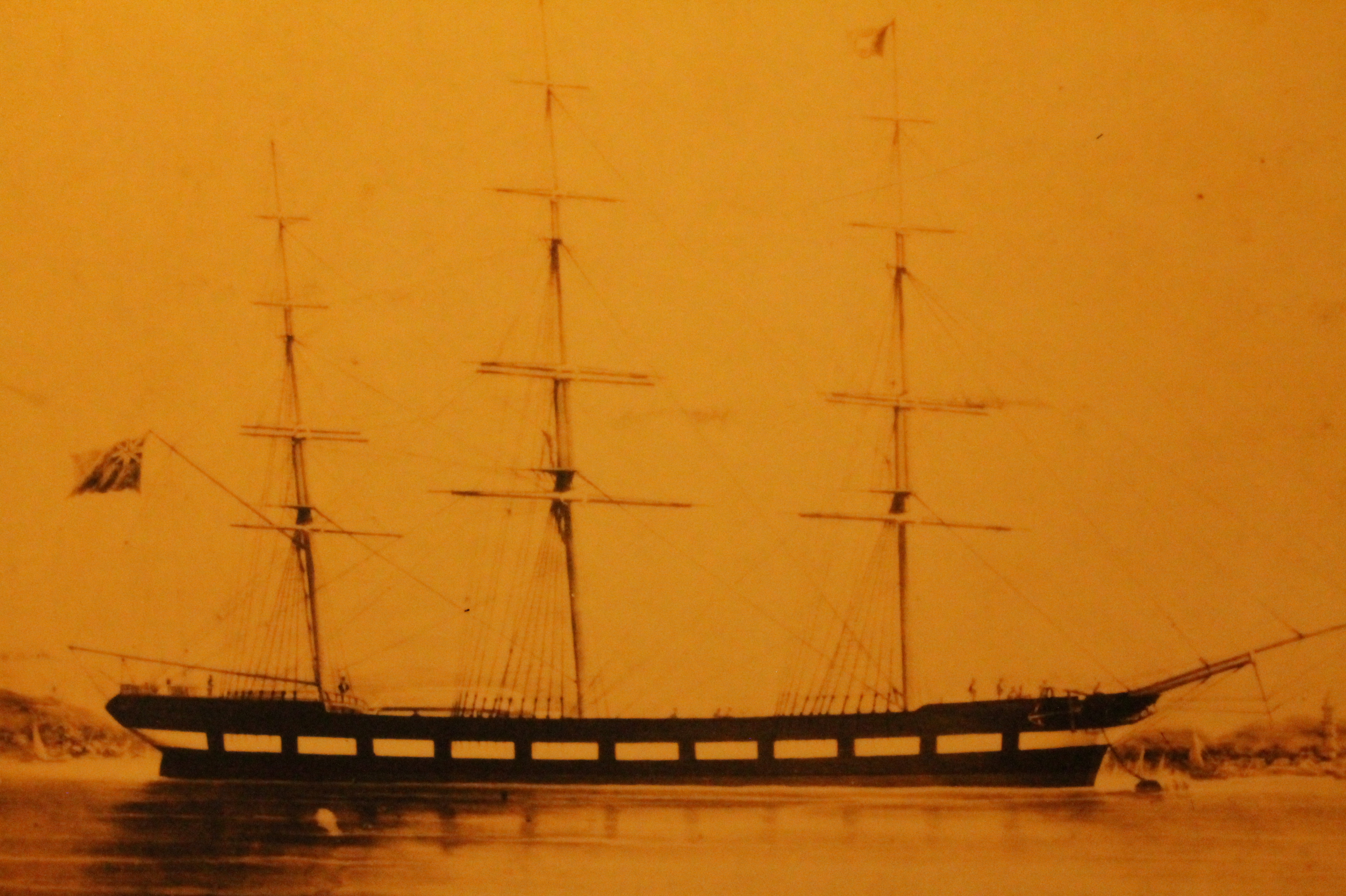
The ship Reindeer by Alexander Hall & Sons, Aberdeen Maritime Museum

A number of vessels have been wrecked on the atoll.

==== Brig Reindeer ====
At midnight on the 26th September 1855, the clipper ship Brig Reindeer was lost upon Pocklington Reef. Captain Edward Storey reported that at 11:30 pm, the lookout on the forecastle reported breakers on the lee bow. The vessel was put hard to the port, but struck hard on the reef and filled immediately to the level of the water outside. The masts were cut away but the mizenmast hit two of the boats on the deck. The ship's 20 ft longboat was got away and pulled through the surf zone. The following morning at daylight the crew saw the small grouping of rocks about 8 miles to the north. They set up a tent from oars and sails and set about removing more materials from the Reindeer.

The crew remained on the small outcrop for 9 days and departed on the 6th of October at 8:30 am with all 19 crew (among the crewmen aboard was Walter Powell). By 4 pm, they had cleared the western end of the reef. After being at sea for 42 days, they reached Port Curtis on 16th November

==== Earl of Hardwick ====
The Earl of Hardwick (280 tons) was on the way from Newcastle, New South Wales, with a cargo of coal to Hong Kong in 1862 when it was wrecked on 10 June.

==== Guinevere ====
The vessel Guinevere with a length of 190.0 ft (57.9 m) and a breadth of 34.9 ft (10.6 m) under Captain Edward Tidmarsh departed Melbourne bound for Manila on the 19 August 1874 with 40 tons of flour as cargo. At 5:25 am on the morning of 4 September 1874, the vessel struck Pocklington Reef. The foremast fell over the side and was soon followed by the mainmast.

On the 6th, the crew abandoned the vessel, with Captain Tidmarsh and 13 others in the longboat, the mate with 7 others in the pinnace and the second mate with six others in the gig. It took a day for the boats to find a way through the reef and depart for Queensland.

The mate's boat arrived at Townsville on 20 September; Captain Tidmarsh in the longboat arrived in Gladstone on 22 September, with the third boat arriving in Bowen.

The wreck of the Guinevere was put up for sale and described as “wrecked on the east end of Pocklington Reef” with only 4 ft (1.2 m) of water at low tide, with a large quantity of planks sufficient to raft all of the stores away which could be taken to the lee side of the reef and put on lighters.

The 90-ton schooner Princess Louise arrived at the site on the 9 November 1874. After approximately 13 weeks, the whole bottom of the Guinevere had been completely smashed in and the wreck was high over the reef with the mizenmast still standing. The Princess Louise could get no nearer to the wreck than 5 miles. After securing materials, they left the site on the 21 November, returning with 300-fathom (1,800 ft; 550 m) of large chain, 45-fathom (270 ft; 82 m) of small chain, the two bow anchors, some foodstuffs (beef, pork and flour) as well as rope, paint and oil and four tons of copper.

==== Amigi Maru ====
The Japanese ship Amigi Maru (280 ft (85 m), 2,249 tons) ran aground during a cyclone in May 1972. It could not be saved and had to be abandoned.

== Fishing ==
A Taiwanese fishing vessel was detected illegally fishing off the reef in October 1979 within PNG's 200-nautical-mile (370 km; 230 mi) fishing zone. The skipper was fined 1000 kina and the vessel's fishing gear was seized.

Sports fishing takes place off Pocklington Reef.

== Marine protected area ==
Pocklington Reef Marine Park is a proposed marine protected area.
