= Henry Britton =

Australian journalist

Henry Britton (24 January 1843 – 21 February 1938) was a journalist in colonial Australia

Britton was the second son of Alexander and Lydia Britton, born in Derby, England, where his father was engaged in tuition, was also a contributor to the press, and had some repute as a public lecturer. Henry Britton emigrated to Australia with his family in November 1854, and reached Melbourne in February 1855. He at once proceeded to Castlemaine, Victoria, where his father established a newspaper called The Miners' Right, subsequently named The Castlemaine Advertiser. He learned the business of a journalist in his father's office.

In 1863 Britton joined the parliamentary reporting staff of The Age newspaper, Melbourne. Two years later he transferred his services to the Argus, Melbourne. In 1870 he acted as special correspondent for the Argus in Fiji. The series of letters he wrote was republished under the title of "Fiji in 1870", and the volume had a large sale. In December 1871, as special correspondent of the Argus, he accompanied the Australian Eclipse Expedition to Cape York, northern coast of Australia, where observations of the total eclipse of the sun were made. His account of the proceedings of the expedition was afterwards republished in Nature, the London scientific journal. In 1873 he went to Fiji again as special commissioner for the Argus to inquire into the working of the South Pacific labour trade, in connection with which many scandals had arisen. The notorious brig Carl had kidnapped a number of South Sea Islanders under circumstances of great atrocity. The Australian Governments agreed to pay the expense of returning the kidnappees to their several homes in the islands. One of the vessels commissioned for this purpose by Commodore Stirling was H.M. schooner Alacrity. Britton was allowed a passage in this vessel with some fifty or sixty of the savages, and he assisted at their landing under circumstances of considerable danger at their various homes in the Marshall, Gilbert, and Ellice groups of islands, north and south of the line. In 1874 he was again called upon in the capacity of special correspondent of the Argus to go to Fiji in the suite of Sir Hercules Robinson, the then Governor of New South Wales, who had made a request that he might be sent on the occasion of the annexation of that country. Britton was present at the official interviews with Seru Epenisa Cakobau and the other leading chiefs, and he fully described the annexation ceremonies, which included many incidents of peculiar interest. Britton was also acting at this time as special correspondent for The Times.

In 1877 Britton was made chief of the Argus reporting staff and sub-editor. Falling into bad health, and having a desire to visit the old country, which he had not seen since infancy, he in 1878 made a voyage round the world. Returning to Melbourne, after a year's absence, he resumed his connection with the Argus, to which he contributed a series of social sketches under the signature of "Marcellus", and also a series of papers explaining the modus operandi of the medical clairvoyants of Melbourne. Early in 1883 he joined the contributing staffs of the Age and Leader. At the end of that year he published a romance called Loloma, illustrative of cannibal life among the Fijians in the olden time. At the general election of 1886, he sought parliamentary honours at the hands of the electors of Castlemaine, but was not successful. In November 1889 the proprietors of the Leader offered prizes for the two best locally produced Christmas stories for publication in their Christmas number; there was a very large number of competitors, and Britton was awarded the first prize for his story "Jack Travis's Merry Christmas: a Tale of Australian Adventure." In March 1890 Britton was appointed dramatic editor of the Australasian.

Britton died at Wonthaggi Hospital on 21 February 1938, at the age of 95.
