= Etta Wriedt =

American spiritual medium

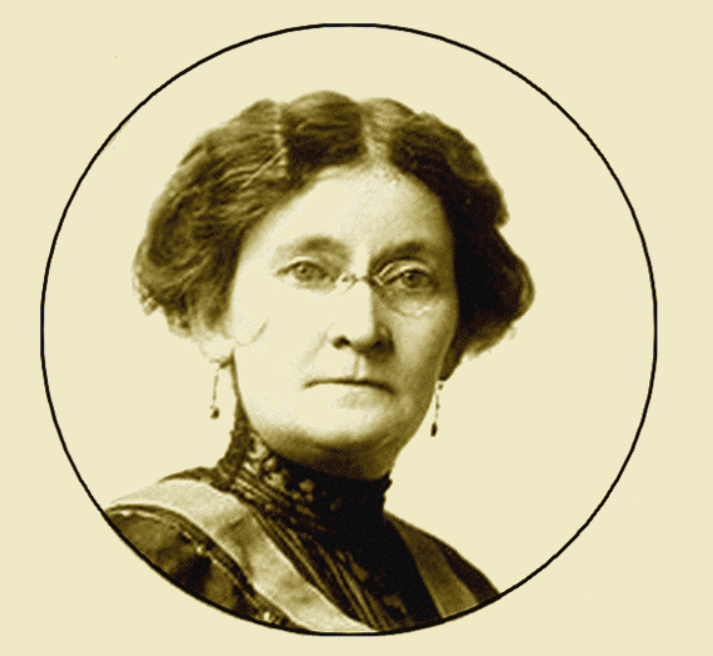
- Born: Henrietta Knapp; 1862; Oswego, New York
- Died: 1942; Detroit, Michigan
- Spouse: Phillip Wreidt

Etta Wriedt (1862–1942) was an American direct voice medium.

Wriedt was born in Oswego, New York and was well known in the field of spiritualism, she employed a trumpet in the darkness of the séance room which she claimed spirits would use to make noises and voices. She charged people money to attend her séances, one of her spirit guides was "John Sharp" who claimed he was born in Glasgow, Scotland, in the eighteenth century. She visited England five times and held séances with W. T. Stead. Stead and Vice-Admiral William Usborne Moore author of the book, The Voices (1913) endorsed her mediumship as genuine.

== Fraud ==
W. B. Yeats who attended séances found them interesting but was skeptical and expressed doubts about the voices. This led to his dismissal from Wriedt's séances.

Wriedt was exposed as a fraud by the physicist Kristian Birkeland when he discovered the noises produced by her trumpet were caused by chemical explosions induced by potassium and water and in other cases by lycopodium powder. Joseph McCabe wrote:

[Birkeland] jumped up, switched on the electric light, and, before the Spiritualists could interfere, had snatched the two trumpets from the floor... So the curtain fell on one more glorious act in the Spiritualist drama. Mrs. Wriedt had put in the trumpet particles of metallic potassium which, meeting the moisture she had also thoughtfully provided, explained the "psychic movements." Close examination disclosed that on other occasions she had used Lycopodium seeds to produce the same effect.

McCabe also wrote that the "spirit" voices heard in the séance were Wriedt herself and were performed by a hidden telescopic aluminium tube.

She has been described as a skilled practitioner of ventriloquism.
