= Bangs sisters =

American medium

The Bangs Sisters
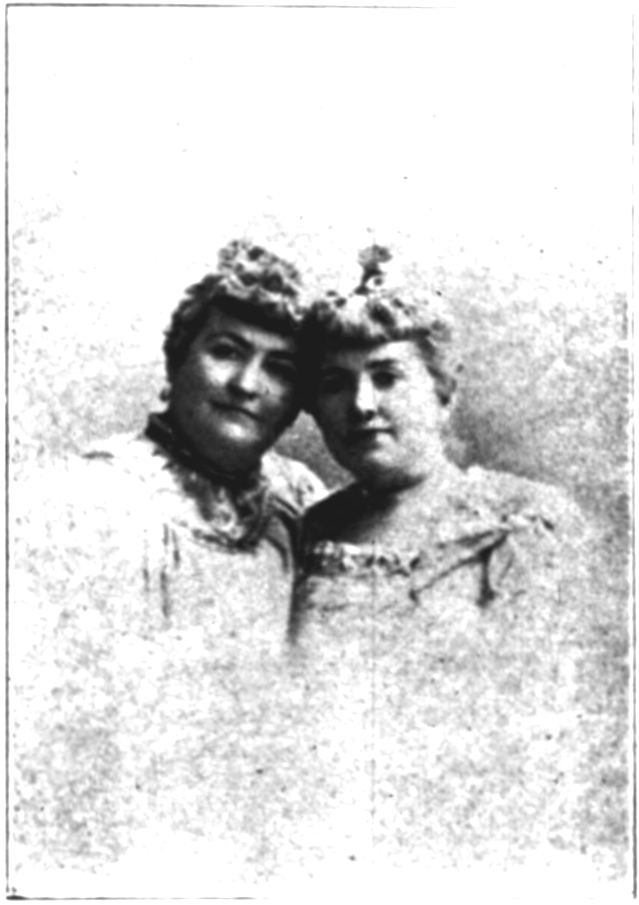
- Lizzie and May Bangs, circa 1897
- Born: May: October 1, 1862, Atchison, Kansas; Lizzie: March 29, 1859, Atchison, Kansas
- Died: May: April 26, 1917 (aged 54), Chicago; Lizzie: March 29, 1920 (aged 61), Chicago
- Occupation: Spiritualist Mediums

The Bangs Sisters, Mary "May" E. Bangs (1862–1917) and Elizabeth "Lizzie" Snow Bangs (1859–1920), were two fraudulent spiritualist mediums from Chicago, who made a career out of painting the dead or "Spirit Portraits".

== Early life ==
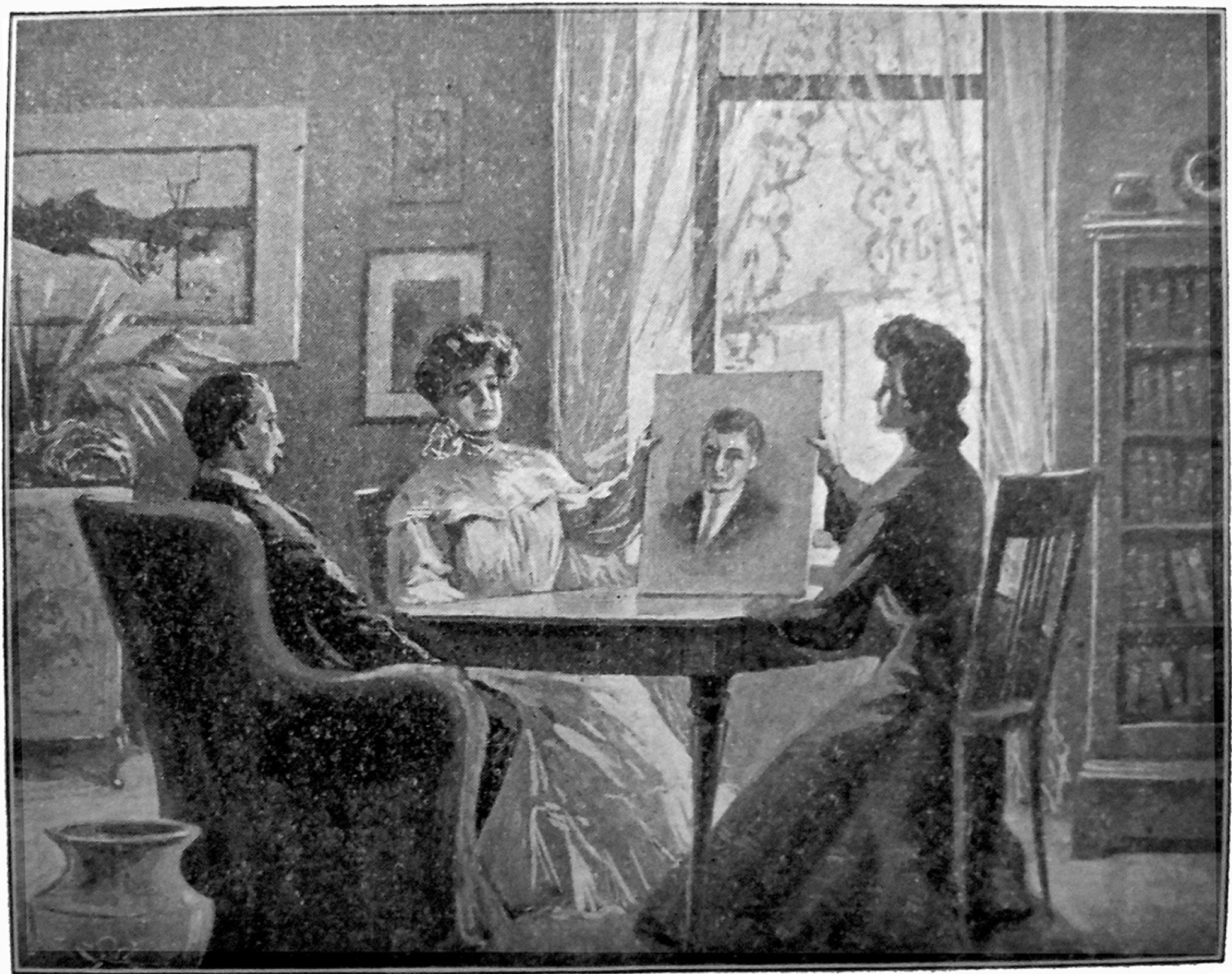
1905 Newspaper Ad: "The Bangs Sisters"

Elizabeth was born in 1859 to Edward D. Bangs (1827–1899) and Meroe L. Stevens Bangs (1832–1917) while they were living in Atchison, Kansas, and Mary was born there in 1862. Edward was a tinsmith and stove repairman, originally from Massachusetts. Their mother was a medium herself.

== Career ==
They moved to Chicago in 1868. By the early 1870s the Bangs family were performing seances as described in an article by Steven Sanborn Jones published on August 3, 1872 in Religio-Philosophical Journal titled "An Evening with the Bangs Children." People paid to be entertained at the Bangs home. It is alleged that messages from the dead appeared on slabs of slate as chairs and furniture moved about the room. The children were tied up in a cabinet, then a guitar inside strummed and hands waved from within. For the finale, Mary brought forward a cat, said to be a "spirit kitten" from the afterworld.

In the summer of 1881, May and her mother were arrested for "doing business without a license", and while they claimed to be evangelists and such charges could not be brought against ministers, they were fined by the police court the following day.

On April 2, 1888, two plainclothes police arrested May and Lizzie during a seance and confiscated all of their props. They were released on bail the next day by William Bangs, their embarrassed brother, and manager of the Chicago Club While they were out on bail, Lizzie's seven-year-old daughter died.

The Bangs Sisters

At the same time, an article in The Washington Post published on April 17, 1888 reported that Lizzie and May Bangs had created the very lucrative firm, the "Bangs Sisters", which operated spiritualistic parlors in the Chicago area. That year, one of their wealthy clients, photographer Henry Jestram, reportedly paid vast amounts of his fortune for their seances. When Jestram died after being committed to an insane asylum, many blamed the Bangs Sisters.

By November 1890, May was on her second divorce, from wealthy chemical manufacturer Henry H. Graham. They had been married under the pretense that his dead wife had told him to do so.

According to the Chicago Daily Tribune, in March 1890, a Chicago grand jury declined to bring charges against the Bangs Sisters, but in May 1891, the Illinois Senate passed a bill:

...prohibiting anyone from personating the spirits of the dead, commonly known as spirit-medium séances, on penalty of fine and imprisonment.

According to the Los Angeles Times, the two sisters even fooled G.W.N. Yost, one of the main investors in the typewriter, with their "spirit typewriter" which produced messages from everyone from Moses to James Garfield. In late 1894, Lizzie and May began "spirit painting", with "Life Sized Spirit Portraits a Specialty" printed on their business cards.

It was not long before they ventured out of Chicago. As reported in the Fort Wayne Sentinel on September 10, 1894, the Bangs conducted a Massachusetts wedding ceremony between a wealthy woman and her dead fiancé.

For the next five years, they regularly held seances and performed the spirit slate writings at their home in Chicago. The spirit paintings were the most commanding of price, with people paying anywhere between $15 and $150 per portrait. Dr. Isaac K. Funk of Funk and Wagnalls paid $1,500 for a number of departed portraits.

In 1907 came the next victim of May's marriages. Millionaire leather manufacturer Jacob H. Lesher was "told" to marry May by his dead mother, and according to a July 16, 1909 story in the Chicago Daily Tribune, was divorced and penniless in less than 24 months.

== Fraud ==
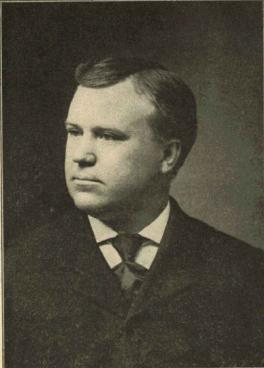
David P. Abbott, a magician who exposed the Bangs Sisters.

Regarding the sisters' drawings, magic historian David Witter has noted that "experts have surmised that sketches were made beforehand, hidden and slowly moved forward into the light by a free hand while the subjects were not looking."

Skeptical investigator Joe Nickell has written that "the Bangses were exposed as tricksters many times."

In 1901, the psychologist Stanley LeFevre Krebs exposed the sisters as frauds; he employed a hidden mirror and caught them removing a blank letter sealed between two slates and writing a reply which they would pretend a spirit had written.

Hereward Carrington who sat with the sisters in 1909 found their slate-writing to be fraudulent. He had also set up a trap by inventing a fictitious mother named "Jane Thompson" in a sealed letter. He received a reply signed by Jane from the sisters. Psychical researcher Paul Tabori noted that Carrington "also analysed their way of producing 'spirit paintings' or 'portraits'. The ladies simply substituted one canvas for another, under the cover of their voluminous dress, the table or window-curtains."

The Bangs sisters were defended by the spiritualist writer William Usborne Moore. He stated in his book Glimpses of the Next State that Carrington had never visited their house. After Carrington gave incontrovertible evidence he had visited the sisters and caught them in fraud, Moore had to publicly retract his charges in a letter for Light, December 14, 1912.

Magician Milbourne Christopher has written:

Wilmar (William Marriott) had read about the marvelous paintings produced during seances by a pair of Chicago psychics, the Bangs sisters. He wrote David P. Abbott, an amateur magician and investigator of alleged psychic phenomena, who lived in Omaha, Nebraska, asking if by chance he had solved the mystery. Abbott replied that not only had he duplicated the marvel, he also had added several touches to make the feat effective onstage. Abbott described the routine in detail.

In 1913, David P. Abbott published a booklet on the subject The Spirit Portrait Mystery, Its Final Solution, revealing fraudulent methods of producing the portraits.
