= John Edgell =

Royal Navy officer and hydrographer

Vice-Admiral Sir John Edgell KBE CB FRS
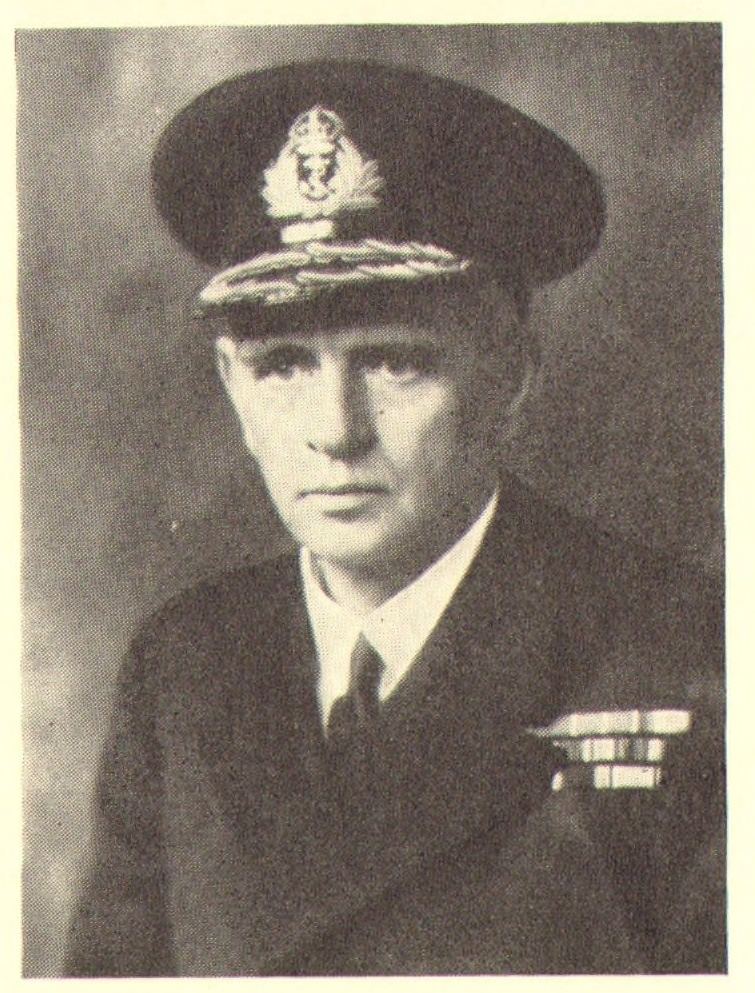
- Born: 20 December 1880; Teddington, Middlesex
- Died: 14 November 1962 (aged 81)
- Allegiance: United Kingdom
- Branch: Royal Navy
- Service years: 1893-1945
- Rank: Vice-admiral
- Office: Hydrographer of the Navy
- Term: 1932-1945

Vice-Admiral Sir John Augustine Edgell KBE CB FRS (20 December 1880 - 14 November 1962) was an officer in the Royal Navy and Hydrographer of the Navy from 1932 to 1945. He was noted for his support for innovations such as echo sounding and radio navigation, for the surveying and chart production operations of his department during World War II, and for his advocacy of the science of oceanography

== Early life to 1914 ==
Admiralty Chart of Johore Strait, surveyed by Edgell in 1921

Edgell was born at Teddington to James and Mary Beatrice Edgell. He joined the Navy aged 13, first on the cadet training ship HMS Britannia, and then on HMS Blenheim. He was promoted to midshipman in June 1897, then joined the surveying service in 1902 as a sub-lieutenant on HMS Triton in the North Sea. He was promoted to Lieutenant on 31 March 1903, and from the same month served on HMS Egeria in British Columbia then HMS Rambler in China and Borneo. He took a course on magnetic observations in 1906, and then continued survey work on HMS Merlin in the Red Sea, Malaya and Borneo, and on HMS Sealark in the Indian Ocean and south-west Pacific. His first command was HMS Mutine surveying on the west coast of Africa from 1912 to 1914. He then surveyed the east coast of Scotland and the Shetland Islands in HMS Hearty.

== World War I to 1931 ==
In September 1915, having been promoted to Commander, Edgell took HMS Endeavour to the eastern Mediterranean in support of the Dardanelles operation. The ship carried printing presses so the charts prepared from her surveying work could be provided to the fleet without the need to be returned to England for printing. Edgell then became Superintendent of Charts, from 1917 to 1920. In 1921 he was again at sea, surveying in Singapore on HMS Merlin. He was promoted to captain in 1923, and again became Superintendent of Charts, from 1923 to 1925. His next surveying assignment was in Australia, commanding HMAS Moresby until 1928. He was Assistant Hydrographer from 1928 to 1932, interrupted by a surveying assignment on HMS Endeavour in the Red Sea in 1930–1931.

== Hydrographer: 1932-1939 ==
Edgell became Hydrographer in October 1932, and would hold this position until the end of World War II. He was promoted to rear admiral in 1935, and to vice admiral in 1938, officially retiring at that point. However he continued in post until 1945. During his time as Hydrographer he oversaw many technical innovations, including the development of echo sounding for deep water work, and the change from flat-bed to rotary offset printing, the latter facilitated by the move of the Chart Printing Establishment to Taunton. He also planned the introduction of a new generation of surveying ships. These developments greatly increased productivity, and laid the basis for the enormous expansion of surveying and chart production needed during the war. Edgell developed his interest in the scientific aspects of surveying during this time, publishing a number of papers on surveying methods, and actively promoting research in oceanography. One project was the construction of a non-magnetic vessel specifically for research into magnetic fields. Construction of the Royal Research Ship (R.R.S.) Research was started in 1937, but interrupted on the outbreak and war, and never restarted.

== World War II ==
During the war, the nature of surveying changed. Minefields had to be cleared, and safe passages marked with buoys. Wrecks had to be surveyed, marked and charted. Damaged harbours had to be re-surveyed. Perhaps the most important work was surveying of coastal areas in preparation for landings, the largest being Operation Neptune on the Normandy coast in 1944. Clandestine surveys were carried out at night on the beaches prior to the planned landings, including shore parties taking samples of the sand. New charts were prepared, incorporating the new material, and also adding in land as well as sea data. During the actual landings, survey boats worked continuously, buoying channels and obstructions. As the invasion developed, they were deployed to survey the harbours of Cherbourg and Saint-Malo when these were taken. Chart production and distribution also faced challenges. Production was greatly increased, and measures were taken to protect the original plates of the charts, and to provide backups.

== Later life: Scientific advisory work and honours ==
Edgell was elected a Fellow of the Royal Society in 1943. In 1944, at a meeting of the Scientific Advisory Committee to the War Cabinet, he suggested that a national oceanographic laboratory should be established in the United Kingdom. Much work had been done in the field in the first half of the 20th-century, but there were no permanent institutions to support this work. The idea bore fruit in 1949, when the National Institute of Oceanography was established under the direction of Dr G.E.R. Deacon. Edgell served on the executive committee of the institute, and on the National Geographic Council.

Edgell was created K.B.E in 1942. He was the Admiralty's representative on the Boards of the Port of London Authority (1941-1950) and the Kent River Board, and acting conservator of the River Mersey (1945-1950). He died on 14 November 1962.

== Bibliography ==
- Edgell, J.A. (1932). "Taut Wire measuring operations at sea". The International Hydrographic Review. 9: 74–75.
- —— (1934). "The Islands of the Tristan d'Acunha Group". The International Hydrographic Review. 11: 20–24.
- —— (1935). "False echoes in deep water". The International Hydrographic Review. 12: 19–20.
- —— (1936). "Notes on Wire-Drag Surveys". The International Hydrographic Review. 13: 21–32.
- —— (1938). "The non-magnetic R.R.S.Research". Journal of Geophysical Research. 43 (4): 389. Bibcode:1938TeMAE..43..389E. doi:10.1029/TE043i004p00389. ISSN 0148-0227.
- —— (1939). The Surveying Service of the Royal Navy. OCLC 560877110.
- —— (1944). "Vertical Section of a Coral Atoll". Nature. 153 (3892): 680. Bibcode:1944Natur.153..680E. doi:10.1038/153680a0. eISSN 1476-4687. ISSN 0028-0836. S2CID 4078921.
- —— (1948). "Hydrographic Surveys in Peace and War". Royal United Services Institution. Journal. 93 (572): 595–598. doi:10.1080/03071844809426232. ISSN 0035-9289.
- —— (1948). Sea Surveys. Britain's Contribution to Hydrography. British Council. OCLC 559403750. Second Edition, 1965
- —— (1949). "Oceanography". Royal United Services Institution. Journal. 94 (573): 87–89. doi:10.1080/03071844909424012. ISSN 0035-9289.
