= Algerine-class gunvessel =

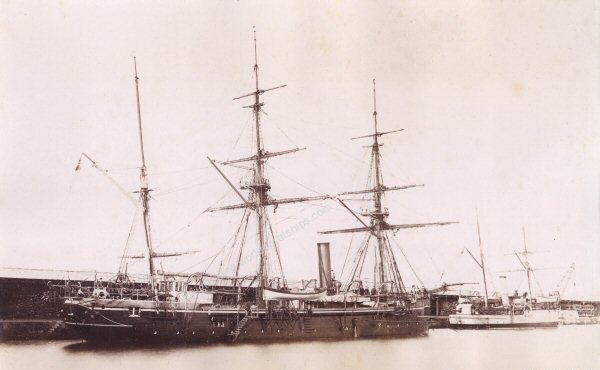
- Rambler with an unidentified gunboat berthed to the right

Class overview
- Name: Algerine class
- Builders: John Elder & Company, Glasgow; Harland & Wolff, Belfast
- Operators: Royal Navy
- Preceded by: Linnet class
- Succeeded by: Dolphin class
- Built: 1880
- In commission: c.1880-1907
- Completed: 3
- Scrapped: 3

General characteristics
- Type: Composite gunvessel
- Displacement: 835 t
- Length: 157 ft (48 m) pp
- Beam: 29 ft 6 in (8.99 m)
- Draught: 13 ft 7 in (4.14 m)
- Installed power: 690 to 750 ihp (510 to 560 kW)
- Propulsion: 2-cylinder horizontal compound-expansion steam engine; Single screw
- Sail plan: Barque or full-rigged ship
- Speed: 10.5 knots (19.4 km/h)
- Endurance: 110t of coal
- Complement: 100
- Armament: Algerine & Ranger: 1 × 7-inch (180 mm) (4½ ton) muzzle-loading rifles; 2 × 64-pounder muzzle-loading rifles; 2 × machine gun; 1 × light gun; Rambler; 4 × 20-pounder breech loading guns; 1 × machine gun; 1 × light gun

The Algerine-class gunvessel was a class of three Royal Navy composite gunvessels built in 1880. Two of them were sold after only ten years of service, but the other was converted to a survey ship before commissioning and survived in this role until 1907.

== Design and construction ==
Designed in 1879 by Nathaniel Barnaby, the Chief Constructor of the Royal Navy, the Algerine-class gunvessels were similar to the Condor-class gunvessels of 1875, but with the addition of a poop deck. It had been found that the addition of both poop and focsle made gunvessels far more comfortable in the tropics; an awning spread between the two allowed men to sleep on the upper deck during hot nights. The composite method of construction used iron for the keel, stem, stern post and framing, with wooden planking. As well as the benefits of low cost, this construction allowed repairs to be conducted easily when away from well-equipped dockyards. This was the last class of composite gunvessels built for the Royal Navy.

=== Propulsion ===
A two-cylinder horizontal compound-expansion steam engine produced between 690 indicated horsepower (510 kW) and 760 ihp (570 kW) through a single screw, giving a speed of about 10.5 knots (19.4 km/h).

=== Sail plan ===
The vessels of the class were barque-rigged, but some of the pictures show yards on the mizzen mast, which would have made them ship rigged. The advantage of the barque rig was the need for less manpower, but on a distant station and with an experienced crew, and infrequent coaling stops, captains sometimes preferred to gain the greater sailing benefits of the ship rig, and had the flexibility to do so.

=== Armament ===
The Algerine-class gunvessels were designed with one 7-inch (180 mm) (4½ ton) muzzle-loading rifles, two 64-pounder muzzle-loading rifles, two machine guns and a light gun. The single 7-inch gun was later replaced by a pair of 5-inch breech-loading guns. Rambler, as a survey vessel, was finished with four 20-pounder breech loading guns, one machine gun and one light gun.

== Service lives ==
=== HMS Rambler ===
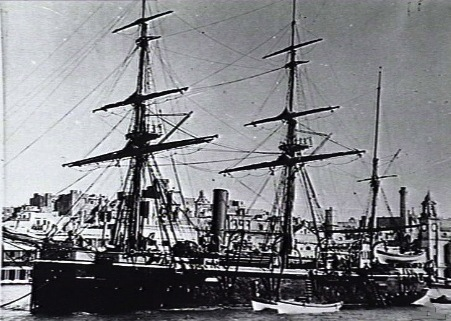
A view of Rambler from the port bow

Rambler was commissioned in 1880 and served on the China Station, including a survey in Western Australia. In 1899 she contributed men to a naval brigade during the Boer War, and was sold in 1907.

=== HMS Ranger ===
Ranger served on the East Indies Station. In 1892 she was sold to the Liverpool Association for the Protection of Commercial Interests as Respects Wrecked and Damaged Property and carried out many of the more challenging salvage jobs, including on SS Suevic and HMHS Asturias. Extensive World War I work on charter to the Admiralty culminated in clearing the blockships left in the Zeebrugge Raid and the Ostend raid, together with the block ships the Germans had been able to place when evacuating before the Allies recaptured these ports.

=== HMS Algerine ===
Algerine commissioned in 1886, six years after she was launched.

== Ships ==
Name	Ship Builder	Launched	Fate
Rambler	John Elder & Company, Fairfield	26 January 1880	Survey vessel in 1884. Sold on 23 January 1907
Ranger	John Elder & Company, Fairfield	12 February 1880	Sold as a salvage ship on 24 September 1892. Broken up in 1947
Algerine	Harland & Wolff, Belfast	6 November 1880	Sold on 10 May 1892
