= William Wharton (Royal Navy officer) =

British admiral and Hydrographer of the Navy

Rear-Admiral Sir William Wharton KCB FRS FRGS FRAS
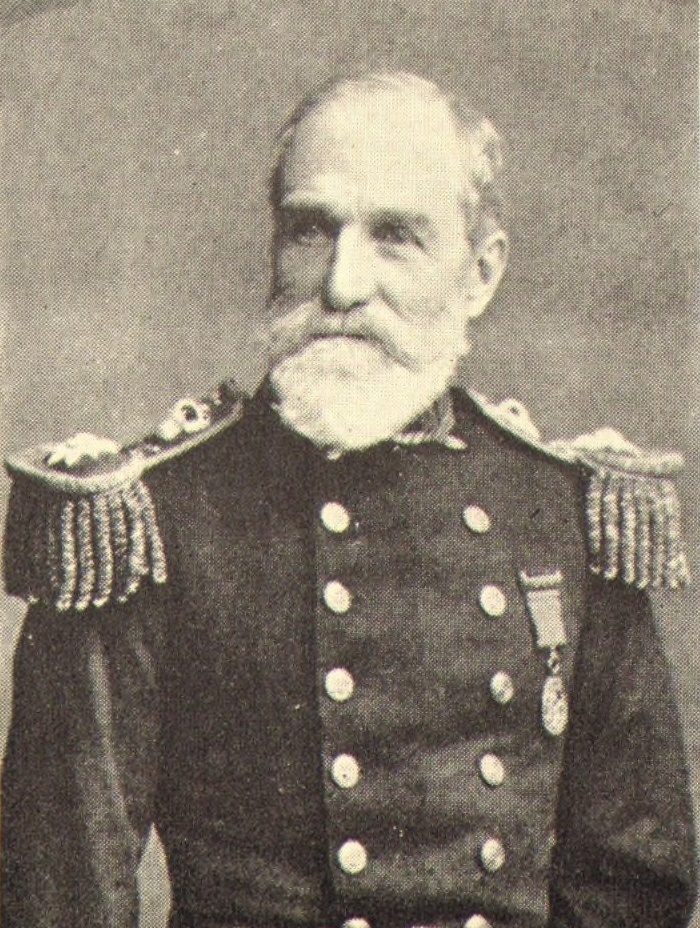
- Born: 2 March 1843; London
- Died: 29 September 1905 (aged 62); Cape Town, South Africa
- Military career
- Allegiance: United Kingdom
- Branch: Royal Navy
- Service years: 1857 - 1904
- Rank: Rear-Admiral
- Commands: HMS Shearwater; HMS Fawn; HMS Sylvia
- Awards: Knight Commander of the Bath (1897); Fellow of the Royal Society (1886)
- Office: Hydrographer of the Navy
- Term: 1884-1904

Rear-Admiral Sir William James Lloyd Wharton KCB FRS FRGS FRAS (2 March 1843, in London – 29 September 1905, in Cape Town) was a British admiral and Hydrographer of the Navy.

== Early life ==
He was born in London, the second son of Robert Wharton, County Court Judge of York. He was educated at Barney's Academy, Gosport and the Royal Naval Academy.

== Royal Navy service ==
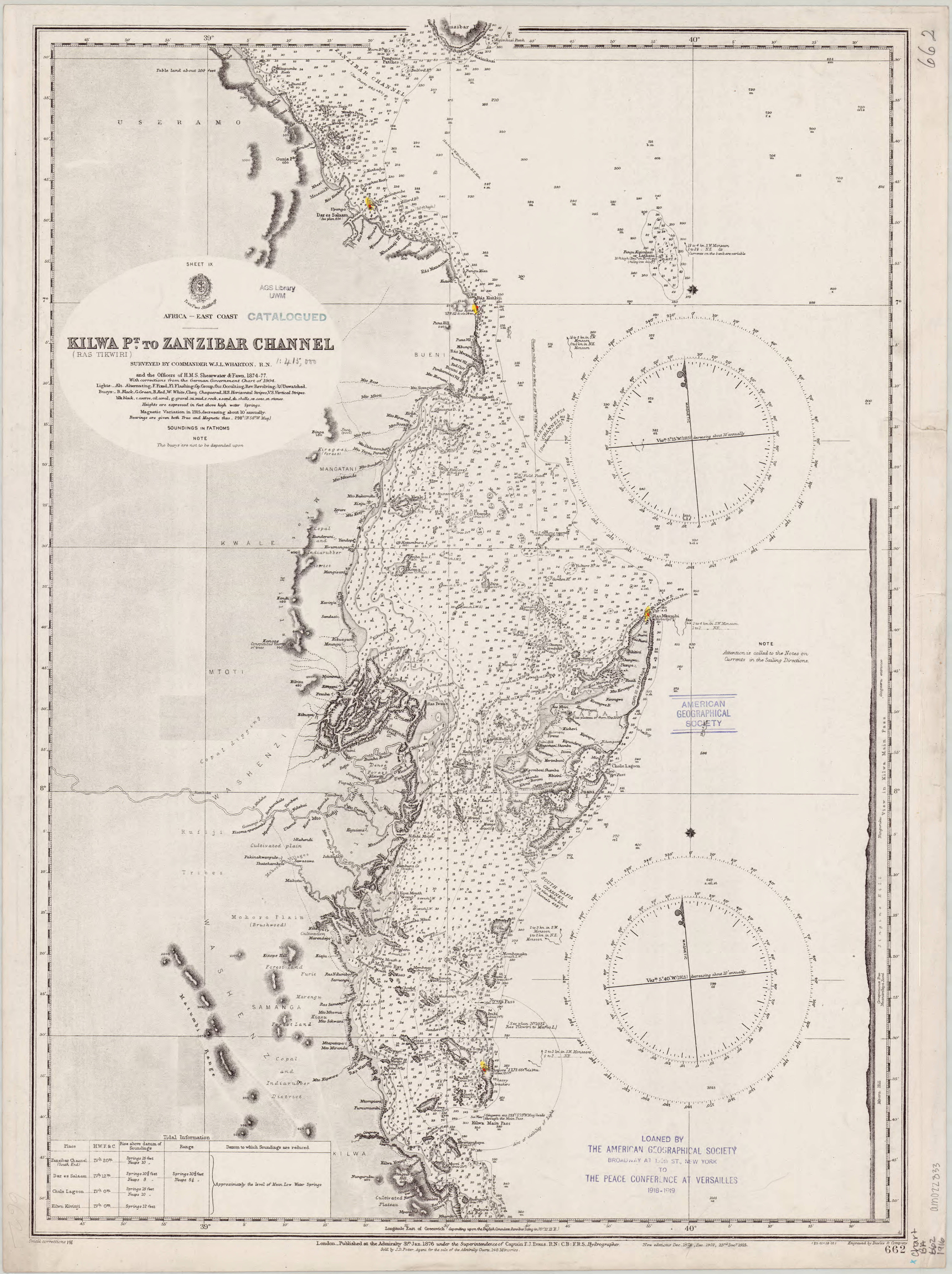
Admiralty Chart, Africa east coast Kilwa Point to Zanzibar Channel, Surveyed in 1874-7

He joined the Royal Navy in August 1857 and was promoted to lieutenant in 1863. His first surveying work was in HMS Gannet, including work in the Bay of Fundy, where some of the highest tides in the world make surveying challenging. In 1870 he was part of an expedition in HMS Urgent to observe a total eclipse of the sun in Gibraltar. He was promoted to commander in 1872. As captain of Shearwater he carried out extensive surveying the Sea of Marmora and the Bosphorus, as well as in the Mediterranean and Indian Ocean. In the Bosphorus he designed ingenious methods to measure the flow at different levels, showing currents and counter-currents. In 1874, Wharton was involved in preparations for the observations of the first transit of Venus, involving the transport of numerous chronometers to determine the longitude of observation stations in the Indian Ocean. He collaborated with David Gill on this work, who became a lifelong friend, and would later be Astronomer at the Cape of Good Hope. This work established an accurate longitude for the Seychelles, which Wharton would use as a basis for his African surveying work. From 1876, as captain of Fawn he surveyed the seas off East Africa. He was promoted to captain in 1880, and for the next two years worked on his manual Hydrographic Surveying. In 1882 he was appointed to H.M.S. Sylvia for survey work in South America, and observed the second transit of Venus in December 1882. On 1 August 1884 he was appointed to the post of Hydrographer of the Navy, which he held for the next twenty years. In 1885, on the death of Sir Frederick Evans he was appointed to the Royal Society committee studying the effects of the eruption of Krakatoa in 1883. The report, published in 1888, included his section on the seismic waves generated by the eruption. In 1895 he was promoted to rear-admiral.

== Awards ==
He was made Knight Commander of the Bath on the Queen's Diamond Jubilee. He was elected Fellow of the Royal Society in 1886. He was also a Fellow of the Royal Geographical and Astronomical Societies.

== Death ==
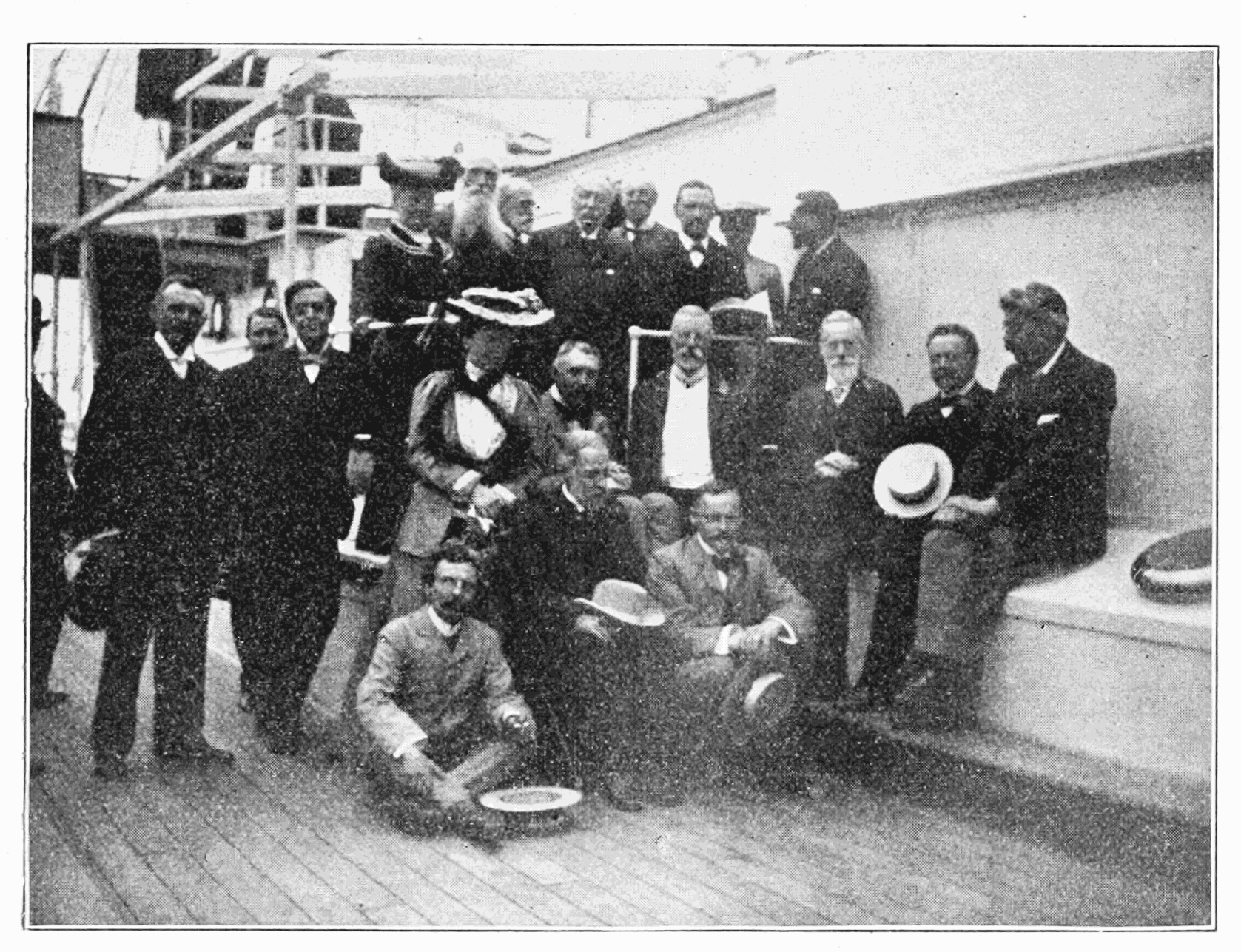
British Association members of the voyage around Africa 1905. W. Warton in the top row, 6th from right

In 1905, the British Association held its meeting in South Africa. Wharton, as President of the Geographic Section of the Association, was one of the party who travelled to attend the meeting. He died of enteric fever at the age of 62 in David Gill's home in Cape Town. Mount Wharton in Antarctica and Wharton Basin in the Indian Ocean are named in his honour.

== Legacy ==
The town of Wharton and Wharton Island, both in Western Australia, are named after him.

== Bibliography ==
- A Short History of H.M.S. Victory, Gathered from Various Sources, Griffen & Co, Portsmouth. (1872)
- Hydrographical Surveying. A Description of the Means and Methods Employed in Constructing Marine Charts, John Murray, London. (1882)
- Captain Cook's Journal during the First Voyage round the World (Editor) Elliot Stock, London. (1893)
- The Eruption of Krakatoa, and Subsequent Phenomena (Contributor), Trübner & Co, London (1888)
