= Rambler, Wyoming =

- Unincorporated community
- Location within the state of Wyoming Rambler (the United States)
- Coordinates: 41°9′31″N 107°00′24″W
- Country: United States
- State: Wyoming
- County: Carbon
- Elevation: 9,321 ft (2,841 m)
- Time zone: UTC-7 (Mountain (MST))
  - Summer (DST): UTC-6 (MST)
- GNIS feature ID: 1597467

Rambler was an unincorporated community and copper-mining town located in Carbon County, Wyoming, United States. It existed between about 1890 and 1912. The post office closed in 1910. The principal mine was the Doane-Rambler, one of the first two commercial copper mines in the Sierra Madre Mountains. Production began in 1895. Not to be confused with New Rambler mine in the Medicine Bow Mountain Range to the east.
