= HMS Fawn (1856) =

Sloop of the Royal Navy

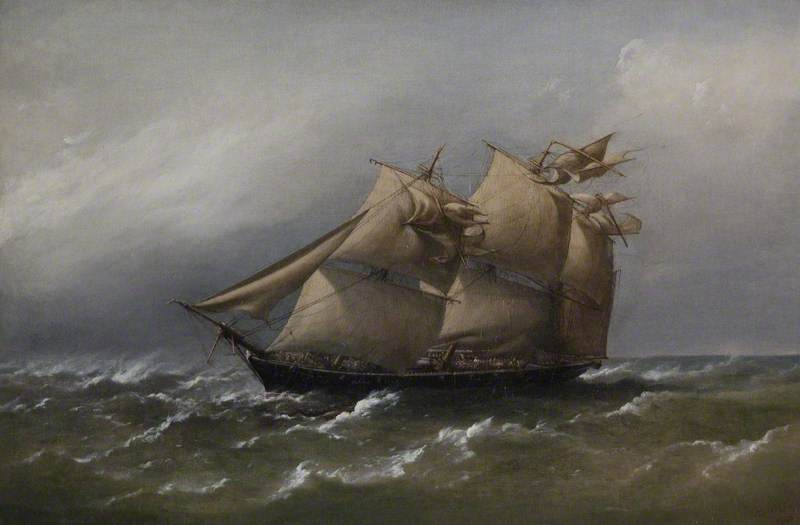
- HMS Fawn Caught in a White Squall, Bass Straits, Australia by Richard Brydges Beechey, 1880

History

United Kingdom
- Name: HMS Fawn
- Ordered: 27 March 1852
- Builder: Deptford Dockyard
- Laid down: 4 May 1854
- Launched: 30 September 1856
- Commissioned: 26 November 1859
- Decommissioned: 1884
- Fate: Survey ship from 1876; Sold in 1884

General characteristics
- Class & type: Cruizer-class screw sloop
- Displacement: 1,045 tons
- Tons burthen: 747 51/94 bm
- Length: 160 ft (49 m) (gundeck); 140 ft 1.75 in (42.7165 m) (keel)
- Beam: 31 ft 10 in (9.70 m)
- Draught: 11 ft (3.4 m)
- Depth of hold: 17 ft 6 in (5.33 m)
- Installed power: 100 nominal horsepower; 434 ihp (324 kW)
- Propulsion: Two-cylinder horizontal single-expansion steam engine; Single screw
- Sail plan: Barque-rigged
- Speed: 8.7 knots (16.1 km/h; 10.0 mph)
- Armament: One 32 pdr (56 cwt) pivot gun; Sixteen 32 pdr (32 cwt) carriage guns

HMS Fawn was a Royal Navy 17-gun Cruizer-class sloop launched in 1856. She served on the Australia, North America and Pacific stations before being converted to a survey ship in 1876. She was sold and broken up in 1884.

== Construction ==
Fawn was launched on 30 September 1856 from Deptford Dockyard.

== Australia station ==
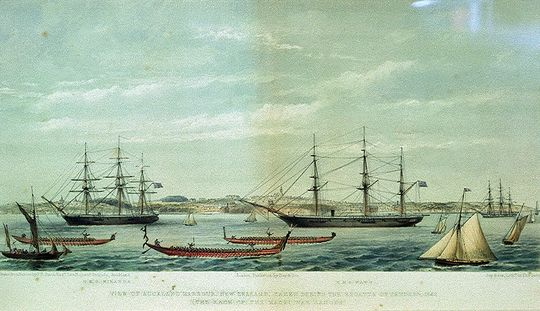
HMS Miranda (left) and Fawn (right) during the Regatta of January 1862 ("the race of the Maori war canoes")

She was commissioned at Sheerness on 30 October 1859 and until 1863 served on the Australia Station.

== North America station ==
She refitted at Sheerness in 1863, and from 1864 to 1868 served on the North America and West Indies Station (Halifax, Nova Scotia and Bermuda). On 29 May 1866, she was driven ashore. Repairs cost £1,600. Nobody was found to be to blame for the incident.

== Pacific station ==
After a second refit at Sheerness in 1869 she went to the Pacific Station in Esquimalt, British Columbia, where she remained until 1875.

== Survey ship ==
In 1876 she was converted to a survey ship, and in this role she surveyed areas of the east coast of Africa, the Sea of Marmara and the Mediterranean. She was under the command of Commander William Wharton from 1 June 1876 to 1 January 1880 and then under the command of Commander Pelham Aldrich until paying off.

== Fate ==
On 6 April 1883 she paid off, and she was sold for breaking the next year.
