= HMS Renard (1873) =

History

United Kingdom
- Name: HMS Renard
- Builder: John Cuthbert, Millers Point, New South Wales
- Launched: 16 January 1873
- Fate: Sold in March 1883.

General characteristics
- Type: Beagle-class schooner
- Tons burthen: 120 bm
- Length: 77 ft 0 in (23.5 m)
- Beam: 18 ft 6 in (5.6 m)
- Depth of hold: 8 ft 6 in (2.59 m)
- Sail plan: Schooner
- Complement: 27
- Armament: 1 × 12-pounder gun

HMS Renard was a schooner of the Royal Navy, built by John Cuthbert, Millers Point, New South Wales and launched 16 January 1873.

She commenced service on the Australia Station at Sydney in 1873 for anti-blackbirding operations in the South Pacific and later hydrographic surveys around Chesterfield Islands, Fiji and the Russell Islands. She ran aground on an uncharted reef in late 1874. Her captain was deemed blameless in the matter of the grounding. Under the command of Captain Pugh, she was engaged in anti-blackbirding operations in 1876 and visited Nukufetau in the Ellice Islands in search of Bully Hayes, who was notorious for his blackbirding activities.

She was paid off in 1883 and sold. She was then employed in the Solomon Islands trade.
