= HMS Rambler (1880) =

Gunvessel of the Royal Navy

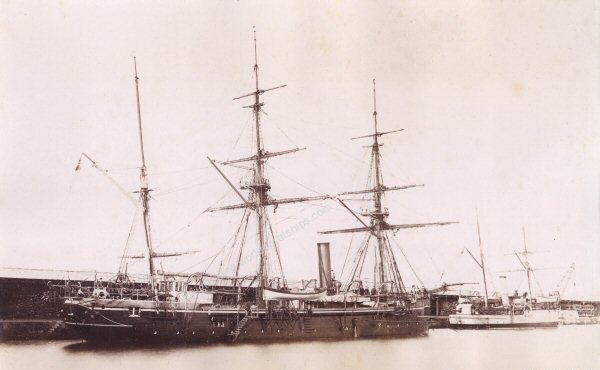
- Rambler with an unidentified gunboat berthed to the right

History

United Kingdom
- Name: HMS Rambler
- Builder: John Elder & Co., Glasgow
- Cost: Hull £26,625; Machinery £10,413
- Yard number: 227
- Laid down: 1879
- Launched: 26 January 1880
- Commissioned: 1884
- Fate: Sold on 23 January 1907

General characteristics
- Class & type: Algerine-class gunvessel
- Displacement: 835t
- Length: 157 ft (48 m) pp
- Beam: 29 ft 6 in (8.99 m)
- Draught: 13 ft 7 in (4.14 m)
- Installed power: 690 ihp (510 kW)
- Propulsion: 2-cylinder horizontal compound-expansion steam engine; Single screw
- Sail plan: Barque or full-rigged ship
- Speed: 10.5 knots (19.4 km/h)
- Endurance: 110t of coal
- Complement: 100
- Armament: 4 × 20-pdr breech loading guns; 1 × machine gun; 1 × light gun

HMS Rambler was an Algerine-class gunvessel of the Royal Navy, built by John Elder & Co., Glasgow and launched on 26 January 1880. She was commissioned as a survey vessel in 1884 and served in Chinese waters during the 1880s and 1890s. She provided men to a naval brigade during the Boer War and was sold on 23 January 1907. The work of this vessel is now remembered in Hong Kong by the Rambler Channel near Tsing Yi.

== Design and construction ==
Designed in 1879 by Nathaniel Barnaby, the Chief Constructor of the Royal Navy, the Algerine-class gunvessels were similar to the Condor-class gunvessels of 1875, but with the addition of a poop deck. It had been found that the addition of both poop and focsle made gunvessels far more comfortable in the tropics; an awning spread between the two allowed men to sleep on the upper deck during hot nights. The composite method of construction used iron for the keel, stem, stern post and framing, with wooden planking. As well as the benefits of low cost, this construction allowed repairs to be conducted easily when away from well-equipped dockyards.

=== Propulsion ===
A two-cylinder horizontal compound-expansion steam engine provided by the builders produced 690 ihp (510 kW) through a single screw, giving a speed of about 10.5 knots (19.4 km/h).

=== Sail plan ===
The vessels of the class were barque-rigged, but some of the pictures show yards on the mizzen mast, which would have made them ship rigged. The advantage of the barque rig was the need for less manpower, but on a distant station and with an experienced crew, and infrequent coaling stops, captains sometimes preferred to gain the greater sailing benefits of the ship rig, and had the flexibility to do so.

=== Armament ===
The Algerine-class gunvessels were designed with one 7-inch (180 mm) (4½ ton) muzzle-loading rifles, two 64-pounder muzzle-loading rifles, 2 machine guns and a light gun. Rambler, as a survey vessel, was finished with four 20-pdr breech loading guns, one machine gun and one light gun.

=== Build ===
The keel was laid at the Fairfield yard of John Elder & Co. in 1879 and she was launched on 26 January 1880. She was not commissioned until 1884, by which time she had been completed as a survey vessel.

== Surveys ==
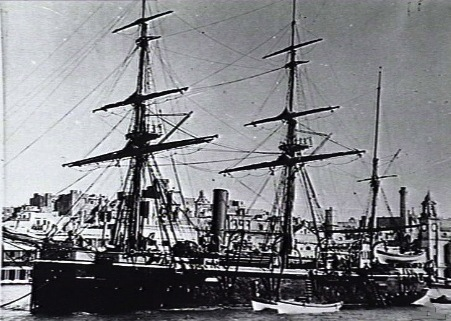
A view of Rambler from the port bow

Rambler conducted extensive surveys in the Red Sea and Far East, and from 1886 served on the China Station. For a few months between October 1889 and April 1890 she conducted a survey in Western Australian waters under the command of G. E. Richards. She recommissioned on 1 February 1889 at Hong Kong, (Note: It was the general practice of the Royal Navy during this period to send a crew out to a distant station, recommission the ship with the new crew, and send the old crew back home. This allowed the hulls to be exploited to the maximum extent possible.) where she conducted extensive soundings and triangulation surveys after participating in the Boer War.

In 1897 she surveyed the Strait of Belle Isle in the Atlantic.

== Boer War ==
Between November 1899 and June 1900 Rambler contributed men to a naval brigade made up primarily of men from Doris, and they fought at Graspan and Magersfontein.

At the turn of the century, she was under the command of Commander Herbert Purey-Cust as she visited Port Said on 30 December 1900, leaving again two days later.

In May 1902 she was back at the China station, Captain Morris Henry Smyth in command, and in November that year she is reported leaving Nagasaki for Amoy.

== Fate ==
She was sold on 23 January 1907.
