= Hydrographer of the Navy =

Key United Kingdom military science post

- Incumbent; Rear Admiral Angus Essenhigh since 2023
- Ministry of Defence
- Reports to: First Sea Lord
- Nominator: Admiralty Board
- Appointer: Secretary of State for Defence
- Term length: 1–4 years
- Inaugural holder: Alexander Dalrymple
- Formation: 12 August 1795 (231 years ago)

The Hydrographer of the Navy is the principal hydrographical Royal Naval appointment. From 1795 until 2001, the post was responsible for the production of charts for the Royal Navy, and around this post grew the United Kingdom Hydrographic Office (UKHO).

In 2001, the post was disassociated from UKHO, and the Hydrographer of the Navy is now a title bestowed upon the current captain—hydrography and meteorology—on the staff of the Devonport Flotilla at HMNB Devonport.

== History ==
Before the establishment of the post, captains of Royal Navy ships were responsible for the provision of their own charts. In practice this meant that ships often sailed with inadequate information for safe navigation, and that when new areas were surveyed, the data rarely reached all those who needed it. The Admiralty appointed Alexander Dalrymple as hydrographer on 12 August 1795, with a remit to gather and distribute charts to HM Ships. Within a year existing charts had been collated, and the first catalogue published. It was five years before the first chart—of Quiberon Bay in Brittany—was produced by the Hydrographer.

Under Dalrymple's successor, Captain Thomas Hurd, Admiralty charts were sold to the general public, and by 1825, there were 736 charts listed in the catalogue. In 1829, the first Sailing Directions were published, and in 1833, under Rear-Admiral Sir Francis Beaufort—of the eponymous Beaufort scale—the tide tables were first published. Notices to Mariners came out in 1834, allowing for the timely correction of charts already in use. Beaufort was certainly responsible for a step change in output; by the time he left the office in 1855, the Hydrographic Office had a catalogue of nearly 2,000 charts and was producing over 130,000 charts, of which about half were provided to the Royal Navy and half sold.

In 1939, on the outbreak of World War II, the Hydrographic Office moved to Taunton, and the post of hydrographer moved with it. In 2001, a chief executive was appointed to run the United Kingdom Hydrographic Office as a profit-making agency of the British government, and at this time the roles of National Hydrographer and Hydrographer of the Navy were divided. The title of hydrographer devolved to Captain (hydrography and meteorology), a senior officer on the staff of the Commodore of the Devonport Flotilla, and the senior Royal Navy officer within the HM branch. As of 2010, the post has been renamed Captain (HM Ops), but continues to carry the title Hydrographer of the Navy.

== List of hydrographers ==
- 1795–1808: Alexander Dalrymple
- 1808–1823: Captain Thomas Hurd
- 1823–1829: Rear Admiral Sir Edward Parry
- 1829–1855: Rear Admiral Sir Francis Beaufort
- 1855–1863: Rear Admiral John Washington
- 1863–1874: Vice Admiral Sir George Richards
- 1874–1884: Captain Sir Frederick Evans
- 1884–1904: Rear Admiral Sir William Wharton
- 1904–1909: Rear Admiral Sir Arthur Mostyn Field
- 1909–1914: Rear Admiral Sir Herbert Purey-Cust
- 1914–1919: Rear Admiral Sir John Parry
- 1919–1924: Vice Admiral Sir Frederick Learmonth
- 1924–1932: Vice Admiral Sir Percy Douglas
- 1932–1945: Vice Admiral Sir John Edgell
- 1945–1950: Rear Admiral Arthur Norris Wyatt
- 1950–1955: Vice Admiral Sir Archibald Day
- 1955–1960: Rear Admiral Kenneth Collins
- 1960–1966: Rear Admiral Sir Edmund Irving
- 1966–1971: Rear Admiral Steve Ritchie
- 1971–1975: Rear Admiral Geoffrey Hall
- 1975–1985: Rear Admiral Sir David Haslam
- 1985–1990: Rear Admiral Roger Morris
- 1990–1994: Rear Admiral John Myres
- 1994–1996: Rear Admiral Sir Nigel Essenhigh
- 1996–2001: Rear Admiral John Clarke

Note : The title National Hydrographer was created with the appointment of Dr Wyn Williams as CEO UKHO and National Hydrographer after the Survey Squadron under Captain HM who assumed the title Hydrographer of the Navy ( who became a Non-Exec Board Member of UKHO) was brought under CINCFLEET, this carried on with his successor Mr Mike Robinson as CEO, but the separate role of National Hydrographer (and Deputy CEO UKHO) was created in 2006 and filled in turn by:

- 2006–2010: Rear Admiral Ian Moncrieff
- 2010–2012: Rear Admiral Nick Lambert
- 2012–2015: Rear Admiral Tom Karsten
- 2015–2018: Rear Admiral Tim Lowe
- 2018–2023: Rear Admiral Peter Sparkes
- 2023–Present: Rear Admiral Angus Essenhigh

Moncrieff, Lowe and Sparkes also went on to become CEO UKHO after their time as NH

Captain HM and Hydrographer of the Navy in this period:

- 2001–2003: Captain Mike Barritt
- 2003–2005: Captain David Lye
- 2005–2007: Captain Ian Turner
- 2007–2010: Captain Robert Stewart
- 2010–2012: Captain Vaughan Nail
- 2012–2013: Captain Stephen Malcolm
- 2013–2016: Captain David Robertson
- 2016–2017: Captain Matt Syrett
- 2017–2019: Captain Gary Hesling
- 2019–2021: Captain Derek Rae
- 2021–2023: Commander Mathew J Warren
- 2023-2026: Commander Adam Coles
