= HMS Alacrity (1872) =

1872 Royal Navy schooner

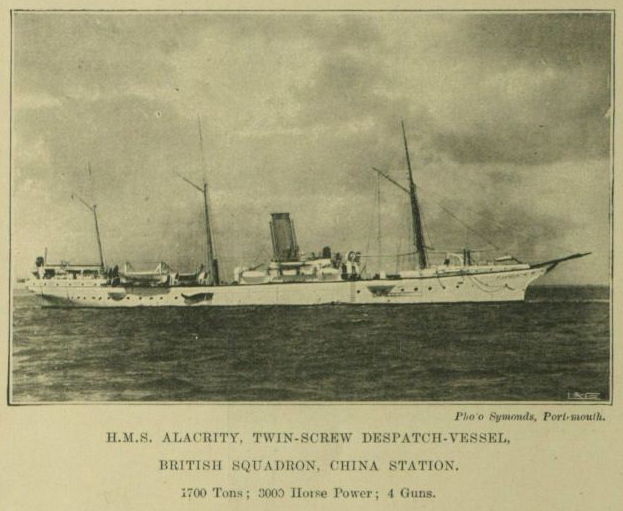
- HMS Alacrity – British squadron China Station, 1898

History

United Kingdom
- Name: HMS Alacrity
- Builder: John Cuthbert, Millers Point, New South Wales
- Launched: 1872
- Acquired: 1873
- Fate: Sold in 1882 to Colony of New South Wales.

General characteristics
- Type: schooner
- Complement: 27

HMS Alacrity was a schooner of the Royal Navy, built by John Cuthbert, Millers Point, New South Wales as the yacht Ethel that the Royal Navy purchased in 1872.

She commenced service on the Australia Station at Sydney in 1873 as a tender for HMS Clio. She was later used for anti-blackbirding operations in the South Pacific and also for hydrographic surveys of Fiji and Australia. On 3 June 1873, Alacrity ran aground in Vita Bay, Fiji Islands. She was refloated. She was paid off in 1882 and sold to the Colony of New South Wales, which converted her to a powder hulk guardship.

Alacrity was in use as an accommodation hulk at Bantry Bay during the Second World War.
