= Ganzfeld experiment =

Pseudoscientific test for extrasensory perception (ESP)

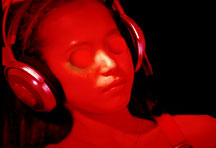
Participant in a ganzfeld experiment

A ganzfeld experiment (from the German words for "entire" and "field") is an assessment used by parapsychologists that they contend can test for extrasensory perception (ESP) or telepathy. In these experiments, a "sender" attempts to mentally transmit an image to a "receiver" who is in a state of sensory deprivation. The receiver is normally asked to choose between a limited number of options for what the transmission was supposed to be and parapsychologists who propose that such telepathy is possible argue that rates of success above the expectation from randomness are evidence for ESP. Consistent, independent replication of ganzfeld experiments has not been achieved, and, in spite of strenuous arguments by parapsychologists to the contrary, there is no validated evidence accepted by the wider scientific community for the existence of any parapsychological phenomena. Ongoing parapsychology research using ganzfeld experiments has been criticized by independent reviewers as having the hallmarks of pseudoscience. (Note: Pseudoscience)

== Historical context ==
The ganzfeld effect was originally introduced into experimental psychology due to the experiments of the German psychologist Wolfgang Metzger (1899–1979) who demonstrated that subjects who were presented with a homogeneous visual field would experience perceptual distortions that could rise to the level of hallucinations. In the early 1970s, Charles Honorton at the Maimonides Medical Center was trying to follow in the footsteps of psychical researchers such as Joseph Banks Rhine who had coined the term "ESP" to elevate the discourse around paranormal claims. Honorton focused on what he thought was the connection between ESP and dreams and began exposing his research subjects to the same sort of sensory deprivation that is used in demonstrations of the ganzfeld effect, hypothesizing that it was under such conditions that "psi" (a catch-all term used in parapsychology to denote anomalous psychic abilities) might work. Honorton believed that by reducing the ordinary sensory input, "psi-conductive states" would be enhanced and "psi-mediated information" could be more effectively transmitted.

Since the first full experiment was published by Honorton and Sharon Harper in the Journal of the American Society for Psychical Research in 1974, such "ganzfeld experiments" have remained a mainstay of parapsychological research.

== Experimental procedure ==
In a typical ganzfeld experiment, a "receiver" is placed in a room relaxing in a comfortable chair with halved ping-pong balls over the eyes, having a red light shone on them. The receiver also wears a set of headphones through which white or pink noise (static) is played. The receiver is in this state of mild sensory deprivation for half an hour. During this time, a "sender" observes a randomly chosen target and tries to mentally send this information to the receiver. The receiver speaks out loud during the 30 minutes, describing what they can "see". The experimenter, who knows nothing of the chosen target, records these comments either on audiotape or through written notes.

Once time expires, the receiver is taken out of the ganzfeld state and shown a set of possible targets, from which they select one which most resembles the images they witnessed. The receiver may refer to the notes/recordings made by the experimenter as needed. Most commonly there are three decoys along with the target, giving an expected rate of 25%, by chance, over several dozens of trials.

Some parapsychologists who accept the existence of psi have proposed that certain personality traits can enhance ESP performance. Such parapsychologists have argued that certain characteristics in the participants could be selected for that would increase the scores of ganzfeld experiments. Such traits have included the following:

- Positive belief in psi; ESP
- Prior psi experiences
- Practicing a mental discipline such as meditation
- Creativity
- Artistic ability
- Emotional closeness with the sender

Critics have pointed out that relying on selection criteria like this can introduce bias in the experimental design, and so generally discussion of any claimed effects has typically included only studies that sample normal populations rather than selecting for "special" participants (see below).

== Analysis of results ==
=== Early experiments ===
Between 1974 and 1982, 42 ganzfeld experiments were performed by parapsychologists. In 1982, Charles Honorton presented a paper at the annual convention of the Parapsychological Association that presented his summary of the results of the ganzfeld experiments up to that date. Honorton concluded that the results represented sufficient evidence to demonstrate the existence of psi. Ray Hyman, a psychologist and noted critic of parapsychology, disagreed. Hyman criticized the ganzfeld experiment papers for not describing optimal protocols, nor including the appropriate statistical analysis. He identified three significant flaws, namely, flaws in randomization for choice of target; flaws in randomization in judging procedure; and insufficient documentation. The two men later independently analyzed the same studies, and both presented meta-analyses of them in 1985.

Hyman discovered flaws in all of the 42 ganzfeld experiments, and, to assess each experiment, he devised a set of 12 categories of flaws. Six of these concerned statistical defects, the other six "covered procedural flaws such as inadequate randomization, inadequate security, possibilities of sensory leakage, and inadequate documentation." Honorton himself had reported that only 36% of the studies used duplicate target sets of pictures to avoid handling cues. Over half of the studies failed to safeguard against sensory leakage and all of the studies contained at least one of the 12 flaws. After considerable back-and-forth over the relevance and importance of the flaws, Honorton came to agree with Hyman the 42 ganzfeld experiments he had included in his 1982 meta-analysis could not in themselves support the claim for the existence of psi.

In 1986, Hyman and Honorton published A Joint Communiqué which agreed on the methodological problems and on ways to fix them. They suggested a computer-automated control, where randomization and the other methodological problems identified were eliminated. Hyman and Honorton agreed that replication of the studies was necessary before final conclusions could be drawn. They also agreed that more stringent standards were necessary for ganzfeld experiments, and they jointly specified what those standards should be.

=== Autoganzfeld ===
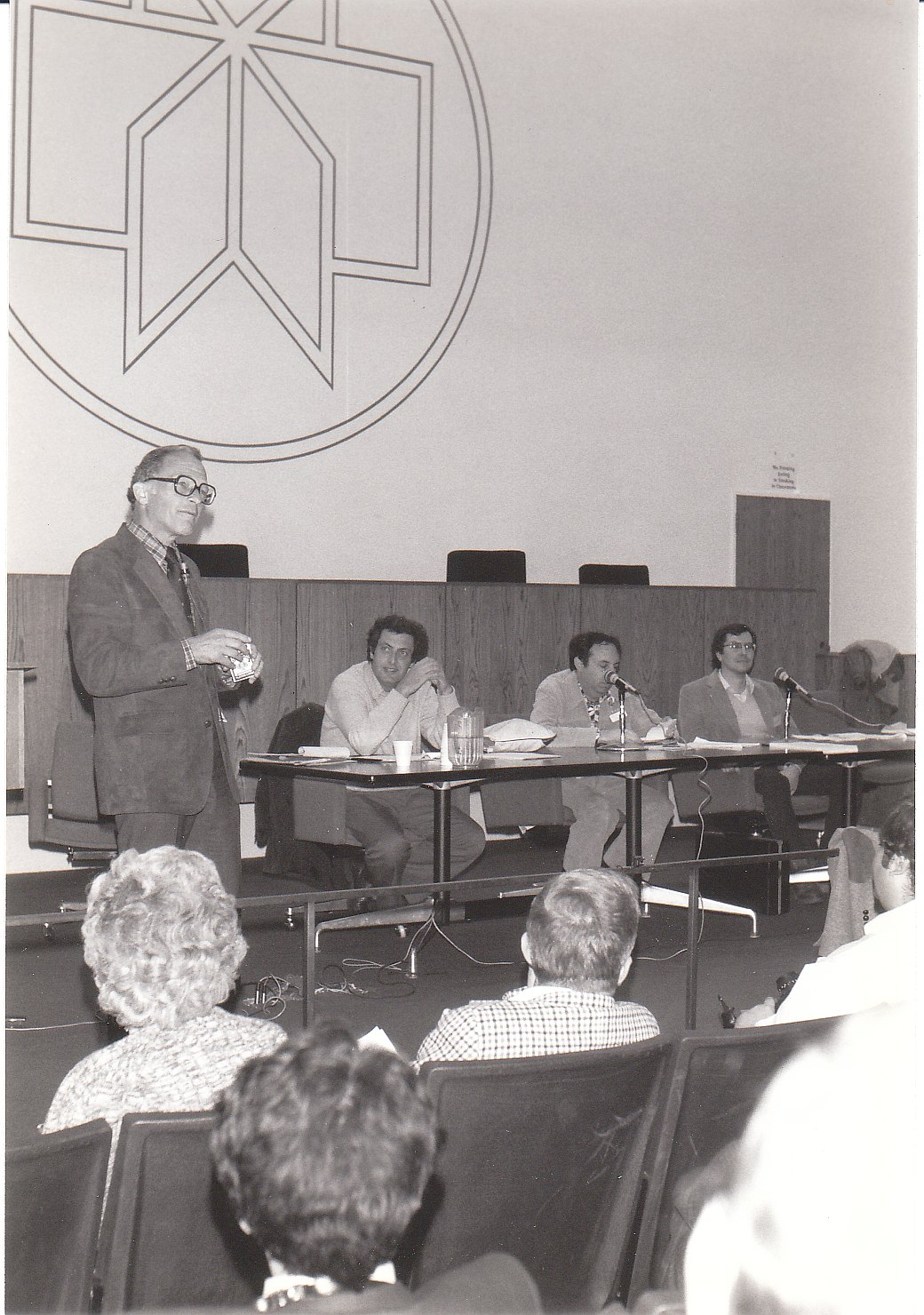
Ray Hyman in 1983 with Lee Ross, Daryl Bem and Victor Benassi

In 1982, Honorton had started a series of "autoganzfeld experiments", that is ganzfeld experiments controlled by a computer, at his Psychophysical Research Laboratories (PRL). The trials continued until September 1989 and in 1990 Honorton et al. published the results of 11 autoganzfeld experiments they claimed met the standards specified by Hyman and Honorton (1986). In these experiments, 240 participants contributed 329 sessions.

Hyman analyzed these experiments and wrote they met most, but not all of the "stringent standards" of the joint communiqué. He expressed concerns with the randomization procedure, the reliability of which he was not able to confirm based on the data provided by Honorton's collaborator, Daryl Bem. Hyman further noted that although the overall hit rate of 32% (7% higher than the 25% expectation from randomness) was significant, the hit rate for static targets (pictures) was, in fact, consistent with random and therefore inconsistent with Honorton's previous claims of positive results from the ganzfeld experiments that were conducted prior to 1982. The significance of the results was due entirely to a new set of "dynamic targets" (videos) that participants were able to identify at a rate that was better than random. In the hit rates regarding these dynamic targets, however, patterns were evident that implied visual cues were leaked:

The most suspicious pattern was the fact that the hit rate for a given target increased with the frequency of occurrence of that target in the experiment. The hit rate for the targets that occurred only once was right at the chance expectation of 25%. For targets that appeared twice the hit rate crept up to 28%. For those that occurred three times it was 38%, and for those targets that occurred six or more times, the hit rate was 52%. Each time a videotape is played its quality can degrade. It is plausible then, that when a frequently used clip is the target for a given session, it may be physically distinguishable from the other three decoy clips that are presented to the subject for judging.

Hyman wrote these studies were an improvement over their older counterparts, but were not a successful replication of the ganzfeld experiments, nor a confirmation of psi. He concluded the autoganzfeld experiments were flawed because they did not preclude the possibility of sensory leakage.

Richard Wiseman published a paper discussing a non-psi hypothesis based on possible sender to experimenter acoustic leakage in the autoganzfeld to account for the results. David Marks has written "Wiseman and his colleagues identified various different ways in which knowledge of the target could have been leaked to the experimenter. These included cues from the videocassette recorder and sounds from the sender who, of course, knew the target's identity... their conclusions provide little reassurance that sensory cueing of the experimenter was in any way substantially blocked."

Milton and Wiseman (1999) carried out a meta-analysis of ganzfeld experiments in other laboratories. They found no psi effect; the results showed no effect greater than chance from a database of 30 experiments and a non-significant Stouffer Z of 0.70.

Lance Storm and Suitbert Ertel (2001) published a meta-analysis of 79 studies published between 1974 and 1996 and concluded the positive statistically significant overall outcome indicates a psi effect. In response, Milton and Wiseman (2001) wrote the meta-analysis of Storm and Ertel was not an accurate quantitative summary of ganzfeld research as they had included early studies which had been widely recognized as having methodological problems which make it impossible to interpret the results as evidence of a psi effect.

Another meta-analysis was conducted by Daryl Bem, John Palmer, and Richard Broughton in which the experiments were sorted according to how closely they adhered to a pre-existing description of the ganzfeld procedure including some experiments that had been published in the time since Milton and Wiseman's deadline. They obtained results that were significant with a Stouffer Z of 2.59, but their detractors maintained their selection of studies for inclusion was problematic.

=== Contemporary research ===
The ganzfeld experiment has continued to be refined over the years. In its current incarnation, an automated computer system is used to select and display the targets ("digital autoganzfeld"). This has the potential to overcome some of the shortcomings of earlier experimental setups, such as randomization and experimenter blindness with respect to the targets.

In 2010, Lance Storm, Patrizio Tressoldi, and Lorenzo Di Risio analyzed 29 ganzfeld studies from 1997 to 2008. Of the 1,498 trials, 483 produced hits, corresponding to a hit rate of 32.2%. This hit rate is statistically significant with p < .001. Participants selected for personality traits and personal characteristics thought to be psi-conducive were found to perform significantly better than unselected participants in the ganzfeld condition. Hyman (2010) published a rebuttal to Storm et al. concluding that the ganzfeld studies have not been independently replicated and had thus failed to produce evidence for psi. According to Hyman, "reliance on meta-analysis as the sole basis for justifying the claim that an anomaly exists and that the evidence for it is consistent and replicable is fallacious. It distorts what scientists mean by confirmatory evidence." Storm et al. published a response to Hyman claiming the ganzfeld experimental design has proved to be consistent and reliable but parapsychology is a struggling discipline that has not received much attention so further research on the subject is necessary. Rouder et al. in 2013 wrote that critical evaluation of Storm et al.'s meta-analysis reveals no evidence for psi, no plausible mechanism, and omitted replication failures.

A 2016 paper examined questionable research practices in the ganzfeld experiments and simulated how such practices could cause erroneous positive results.

== Criticism ==
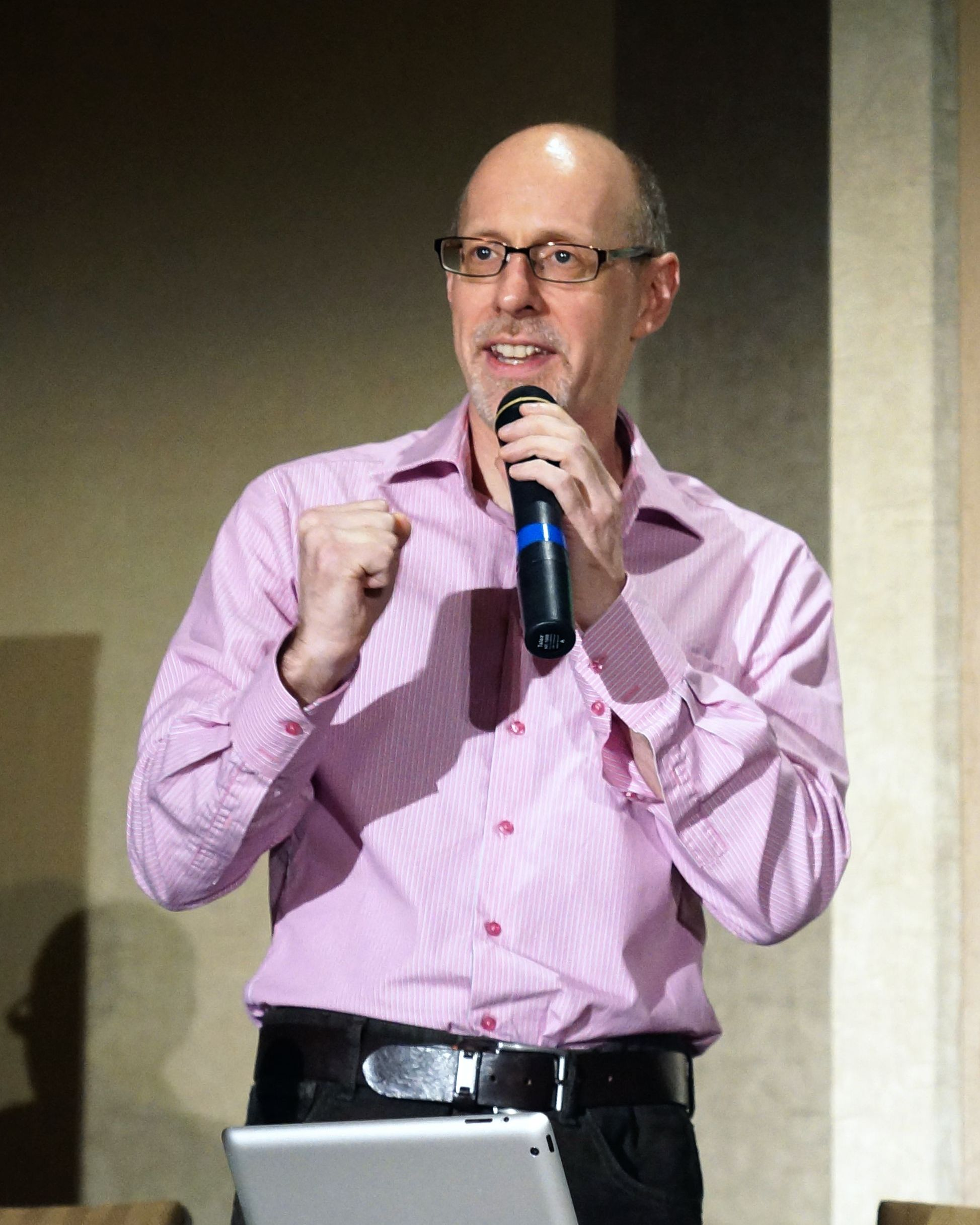
Richard Wiseman has suggested various sensory leakage problems with the autoganzfeld experiments.

There are several common criticisms of some or all of the ganzfeld experiments:

- Isolation – Richard Wiseman and others argue that not all of the studies used soundproof rooms, so it is possible that when videos were playing, the experimenter could have heard it, and later given involuntary cues to the receiver during the selection process. It could even have been possible that the receivers themselves could hear the video.
- Randomization – When subjects are asked to choose from a variety of selections, there is an inherent bias to choose the first selection they are shown. If the order in which they are shown the selections is randomized each time, this bias will be averaged out. The randomization procedures used in the experiment have been criticized for not randomizing satisfactorily.
- The psi assumption – The assumption that any statistical deviation from chance is evidence for telepathy is highly controversial. Strictly speaking, a deviation from chance is only evidence that either this was a rare, statistically unlikely occurrence that happened by chance, or something was causing a deviation from chance. Flaws in the experimental design are a common cause of this, and so the assumption that it must be telepathy is fallacious.

Writing in 1985, C. E. M. Hansel discovered weaknesses in the design and possibilities of sensory leakage in the ganzfeld experiments reported by Carl Sargent and other parapsychologists. Hansel concluded the ganzfeld studies had not been independently replicated and that "ESP is no nearer to being established than it was a hundred years ago."

David Marks in his book The Psychology of the Psychic (2000) has noted that during the autoganzfeld experiments the experimenter sat only fourteen feet from the sender's room. Soundproofing tiles were eventually added but they were designed to "absorb sound not to prevent transmission." According to Marks this was inadequate and no different than using any standard internal wall. The door and door frame were also a possible source of sensory leakage and none of these problems were ever eliminated.

Terence Hines wrote in 2003 that the ganzfeld studies could not be said to provide evidence for psi as the alleged evidence disappears as the tightness of experimental controls is increased. As research progresses variables in science become clearer as more studies are published that describe under what specific condition the particular effect can be demonstrated. This is in opposition to the ganzfeld studies. According to Hines, there was "no clear way to obtain results showing any psychic phenomenon reliably" and that "the most reasonable conclusion" was that the effect did not exist and had never existed.

In a 2007 review, Ray Hyman wrote that parapsychologists agree they have no positive theory of psi as it is negatively defined as any effect that cannot be currently explained in terms of chance or normal causes. Hyman saw this as a fallacy, as it encouraged parapsychologists to use any peculiarity in the data as a characteristic of psi. Hyman also wrote that parapsychologists have admitted it is impossible to eliminate the possibility of non-paranormal causes in the ganzfeld experiment. There is no independent method to indicate the presence or absence of psi.

Until parapsychologists can provide a positive way to indicate the presence of psi, the different effect sizes that occur in experiments are just as likely to result from many different things rather than one thing called psi. Indeed given the obvious instability and elusiveness of the findings, the best guess might very well be that we are dealing with a variety of Murphy's law rather than a revolutionary anomaly called psi.

— Ray Hyman, Evaluating Parapsychological Claims, 2007

In their book 50 Great Myths of Popular Psychology (2011), Scott Lilienfeld and colleagues have written that the ganzfeld being a reliable technique is far from being resolved. They concluded that ESP has not been successfully demonstrated in experiments for over 150 years so this is hardly encouraging.

In a 2013 podcast, Brian Dunning reviewed the flaws of the ganzfeld studies and came to the conclusion the technique had failed as evidence for psi and interest in ganzfeld has declined.

== Controversy ==
In 1979, Susan Blackmore visited the laboratories of Carl Sargent in Cambridge. She noticed a number of irregularities in the procedure and wrote about them for the Journal of the Society for Psychical Research.

It now appeared that in one session – number 9 – the following events had taken place.

1. Sargent did the randomization when he should not have.
2. A 'B' went missing from the drawer during the session, instead of afterwards.
3. Sargent came into the judging and "pushed" the subject towards 'B'.
4. An error of addition was made in favour of 'B' and 'B' was chosen.
5. 'B' was the target and the session a direct hit.

This article, along with further criticisms of Sargent's work from Adrian Parker and Nils Wiklund remained unpublished until 1987 but all were well known in parapsychological circles. Sargent wrote a rebuttal to these criticisms (also not published until 1987) in which he did not deny what Blackmore had observed, but argued that her conclusions based on those observations were wrong and prejudiced. His co-workers also responded, saying that any deviation from protocol was the result of "random errors" rather than any concerted attempt at fraud. Carl Sargent stopped working in parapsychology after this and did not respond "in a timely fashion" when the Council of the Parapsychological Association asked for his data, and so his membership of that organization was allowed to lapse.

Writing for Skeptical Inquirer in 2018, Blackmore states that Sargent "deliberately violated his own protocols and in one trial had almost certainly cheated." Psychologists reading Daryl Bem's review in Psychological Bulletin would "not have a clue that serious doubt had been cast on more than a quarter of the studies involved". When Blackmore confronted Sargent, he told her "it wouldn't matter if some experiments were unreliable because, after all, we know that psi exists". Blackmore also recounts having a discussion with Bem at a consciousness conference where she challenged him on his support of Sargent and Honorton's research, he replied "it did not matter". Blackmore writes, "But it does matter. ... It matters because Bem's continued claims mislead a willing public into believing that there is reputable scientific evidence for ESP in the Ganzfeld when there is not".

== See also ==
- List of parapsychology topics
- List of topics characterized as pseudoscience
- Noumenon
- Remote viewing
- Zener cards
