= Telesthesia =

Telesthesia (also spelled telaesthesia) is a term used in two primary contexts. In parapsychology, it refers to purported non-sensory perception of distant events or stimuli. In media studies, it has also been used metaphorically to describe technologically mediated experiences of remote perception, particularly through telecommunications and digital media.

== Etymology ==
The word derives from the Ancient Greek têle (τῆλε), meaning "at a distance", and aisthēsis (αἴσθησις), meaning "perception" or "sensation".

== Definitions ==
Reputable dictionaries define telesthesia as:

- "Sensation or perception received at a distance without the normal operation of the recognized sense organs." – Dictionary.com
- "An impression supposedly received at a distance without the normal operation of the organs of sense." – Merriam-Webster Medical Dictionary
- "The ability to know that something has happened or is in a place without using hearing, seeing, touch, taste, or smell." – Cambridge Dictionary

== Use in Parapsychology ==
In parapsychology, telesthesia is considered a subtype of extrasensory perception (ESP), and is often used synonymously with or alongside clairvoyance and remote viewing. Historical accounts in spiritualist and psychical research literature describe people reportedly sensing the condition or experiences of distant others. These claims remain anecdotal and lack empirical validation.

== Scientific Evaluation ==
The scientific and skeptical communities regard telesthesia as a form of pseudoscience, similar to other parapsychological claims, due to the absence of reproducible experimental support. Common methodological concerns include confirmation bias, sensory leakage, and uncontrolled variables.

== Metaphorical and Cultural Usage ==
In cultural and media theory, particularly since the 2000s, "telesthesia" has been reinterpreted metaphorically to describe the technologically enabled perception of distant events through devices like the telephone, television, and internet. Media theorist McKenzie Wark explored this usage in his book Telesthesia: Communication, Culture and Class (2012), where he uses the term to analyze how digital technologies shape perception and social space.

== See also ==
- Extrasensory perception
- Clairvoyance
- Remote viewing
- Telepresence
- Parapsychology
- Pseudoscience
