= Sensory leakage =

Flaws in mind-reading experiments

Sensory leakage is a term used to refer to information that transferred to a person by conventional, non-paranormal means during an experiment into extrasensory perception. For example, where the subject in an experiment receives a visual cue—the reflection of a Zener card in the holder's glasses—sensory leakage can be said to have occurred.

== History ==
Zener cards

Scientists such as Donovan Rawcliffe (1952), C. E. M. Hansel (1980), Ray Hyman (1989) and Andrew Neher (2011) have studied the history of psi experiments from the late 19th century up until the 1980s. In every experiment investigated, flaws and weaknesses were discovered so the possibility of naturalistic explanations (such as sensory cues) or deception and trickery were not ruled out. The data from the Creery sisters and the Soal–Goldney experiments were proven to be fraudulent, one of the subjects from the Smith-Blackburn experiments confessed to fraud, the Brugmans' experiment, the experiments by John E. Coover, Joseph Gaither Pratt, and Helmut Schmidt did not rule out the possibility of sensory cues or trickery.

In the 20th century, J. B. Rhine carried out experiments into ESP. His experiments were discredited due to the discovery that sensory leakage or cheating could account for all his results such as the subject being able to read the symbols from the back of the cards and being able to see and hear the experimenter to note subtle clues. Terence Hines has written:

The methods the Rhines used to prevent subjects from gaining hints and clues as to the design on the cards were far from adequate. In many experiments, the cards were displayed face up, but hidden behind a small wooden shield. Several ways of obtaining information about the design on the card remain even in the presence of the shield. For instance, the subject may be able sometimes to see the design on the face-up card reflected in the agent's glasses. Even if the agent isn't wearing glasses it is possible to see the reflection in his cornea.

Once Rhine took precautions in response to criticisms of his methods, he was unable to find any high-scoring subjects. Due to the methodological problems, parapsychologists no longer utilize card-guessing studies. Rhine's experiments into psychokinesis (PK) were also criticized. John Sladek wrote:

His research used dice, with subjects 'willing' them to fall a certain way. Not only can dice be drilled, shaved, falsely numbered and manipulated, but even straight dice often show bias in the long run. Casinos for this reason retire dice often, but at Duke, subjects continued to try for the same effect on the same dice over long experimental runs. Not surprisingly, PK appeared at Duke and nowhere else.

The Turner-Owenby long-distance telepathy experiment was discovered to contain flaws. Frances May Turner positioned herself in the Duke Parapsychology Laboratory whilst Sarah Owenby claimed to receive transmissions 250 miles away. For the experiment, Turner would think of a symbol and write it down whilst Owenby would write her guesses. The scores were highly successful and both records were supposed to be sent to J. B. Rhine, however, Owenby sent them to Turner. Critics pointed out this invalidated the results as she could have simply written her own record to agree with the other. When the experiment was repeated and the records were sent to Rhine the scores dropped to average.

A famous ESP experiment at Duke University was performed by Lucien Warner and Mildred Raible. The subject was locked in a room with a switch controlling a signal light elsewhere, which he could signal to guess the card. Ten runs with ESP packs of cards were used and he achieved 93 hits (43 more than chance). Weaknesses with the experiment were later discovered. The duration of the light signal could be varied so that the subject could call for specific symbols and certain symbols in the experiment came up far more often than others which indicated either poor shuffling or card manipulation.

== Ganzfeld experiment ==
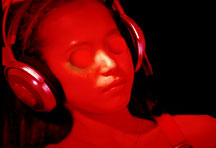
Participant in a Ganzfeld telepathy experiment

The Ganzfeld experiment studies that were examined by Ray Hyman and Charles Honorton had methodological problems that were well documented. Honorton reported only 36% of the studies used duplicate target sets of pictures to avoid handling cues. Hyman discovered flaws in all of the 42 Ganzfeld experiments and to assess each experiment, he devised a set of 12 categories of flaws. Six of these concerned statistical defects, the other six covered procedural flaws such as inadequate documentation, randomization and security as well as possibilities of sensory leakage. Over half of the studies failed to safeguard against sensory leakage and all of the studies contained at least one of the 12 flaws. Because of the flaws, Honorton agreed with Hyman the 42 Ganzfeld studies could not support the claim for the existence of psi.

Possibilities of sensory leakage in the Ganzfeld experiments included the receivers hearing what was going on in the sender's room next door as the rooms were not soundproof and the sender's fingerprints to be visible on the target object for the receiver to see.

Hyman also reviewed the auto-Ganzfeld experiments and discovered a pattern in the data that implied a visual cue may have taken place:

The most suspicious pattern was the fact that the hit rate for a given target increased with the frequency of occurrence of that target in the experiment. The hit rate for the targets that occurred only once was right at the chance expectation of 25%. For targets that appeared twice the hit rate crept up to 28%. For those that occurred three times it was 38%, and for those targets that occurred six or more times, the hit rate was 52%. Each time a videotape is played its quality can degrade. It is plausible then, that when a frequently used clip is the target for a given session, it may be physically distinguishable from the other three decoy clips that are presented to the subject for judging. Surprisingly, the parapsychological community has not taken this finding seriously. They still include the autoganzfeld series in their meta-analyses and treat it as convincing evidence for the reality of psi.

Hyman wrote the auto-Ganzfeld experiments were flawed because they did not preclude the possibility of sensory leakage.

== Remote viewing ==
The psychologists David Marks and Richard Kammann attempted to replicate Russell Targ and Harold Puthoff's remote viewing experiments. In a series of thirty-five studies, they were unable to replicate the results so investigated the procedure of the original experiments. Marks and Kammann discovered that the notes given to the judges in Targ and Puthoff's experiments contained clues as to which order they were carried out, such as referring to yesterday's two targets, or they had the date of the session written at the top of the page. They concluded that these clues were the reason for the experiment's high hit rates. According to Terence Hines:

Examination of the few actual transcripts published by Targ and Puthoff show that just such clues were present. To find out if the unpublished transcripts contained cues, Marks and Kammann wrote to Targ and Puthoff requesting copies. It is almost unheard of for a scientist to refuse to provide his data for independent examination when asked, but Targ and Puthoff consistently refused to allow Marks and Kammann to see copies of the transcripts. Marks and Kammann were, however, able to obtain copies of the transcripts from the judge who used them. The transcripts were found to contain a wealth of cues.

Thomas Gilovich has written:

Most of the material in the transcripts consists of the honest attempts by the percipients to describe their impressions. However, the transcripts also contained considerable extraneous material that could aid a judge in matching them to the correct targets. In particular, there were numerous references to dates, times and sites previously visited that would enable the judge to place the transcripts in proper sequence... Astonishingly, the judges in the Targ-Puthoff experiments were given a list of target sites in the exact order in which they were used in the tests!

According to Marks, when the cues were eliminated the results fell to a chance level. Marks was able to achieve 100 per cent accuracy without visiting any of the sites himself but by using cues. James Randi has written controlled tests by several other researchers, eliminating several sources of cuing and extraneous evidence present in the original tests, produced negative results. Students were also able to solve Puthoff and Targ's locations from the clues that had inadvertently been included in the transcripts.

Marks and Kamman concluded: "Until remote viewing can be confirmed in conditions which prevent sensory cueing the conclusions of Targ and Puthoff remain an unsubstantiated hypothesis."

In 1980, Charles Tart claimed that a rejudging of the transcripts from one of Targ and Puthoff's experiments revealed an above-chance result. Targ and Puthoff again refused to provide copies of the transcripts and it was not until July 1985 that they were made available for study when it was discovered they still contained sensory cues. Marks and Christopher Scott (1986) wrote "considering the importance for the remote viewing hypothesis of adequate cue removal, Tart's failure to perform this basic task seems beyond comprehension. As previously concluded, remote viewing has not been demonstrated in the experiments conducted by Puthoff and Targ, only the repeated failure of the investigators to remove sensory cues."
