= Pavel Štěpánek =

Pavel Štěpánek (born 1931) is a retired Czech celebrity psychic. He became, during the 1960s, the most tested individual participant in parapsychology experiments, both in terms of number of trials, and number of independent investigators. In 1968, results of these experiments were published in the journal Nature, with Joseph Gaither Pratt as principal author.

Critics have pointed out numerous experimental flaws in the tests that would have resulted in Štěpánek being able to guess correctly with no need for extrasensory perception, and have noted that when these problems were eliminated, Pavel failed the tests.

== Biography ==
Štěpánek was born in Prague, then in Czechoslovakia, in 1931. After completing secondary school, he was employed as a foreign-language correspondent for an export firm, and later as an information clerk for the Prague Central Library. He held this position throughout the duration of his participation in the experiments. These commenced when, in June 1961, Štěpánek responded to a public notice by Milan Rýzl seeking participants. He had no personal or family history of ESP experiences.

== Studies ==
In 1962, the first report, principally by Milan Rýzl, was published of card-calling experiments with Štěpánek. These involved simple tests of the ability to identify the top-facing colour (either green or white) of randomly ordered and concealed cards. The aim of the study was to test the efficacy of hypnotic suggestions for ESP scoring. However, in 1965, once warping of the cards was pointed out as a possible way of identifying which side of the card was facing up, Štěpánek was no longer able to perform this trick.

These experiments nonetheless continued, with increased security and complexity, for 10 years, drawing in investigators from the UK, the USA, Australia, the Netherlands, Japan, and elsewhere; although the principal investigators were Joseph Gaither Pratt, then at the University of Virginia, and H. H. Jürgen Keil of the University of Tasmania. Pratt and Keil shared the 1970 McDougall Award (from the Foundation for Research on the Nature of Man) for their studies with Štěpánek, as published in 1969. The complete studies were reviewed by Pratt and Keil. However, all these studies had possible experimental errors that could have given Pavel information on what colour to guess.

In some experiments, experimenters could have seen the colour, and thus transmitted information to Štěpánek. No attempt at olfactory controls was attempted, in several cases the experimenter was aware of what colour the card was, and thus could have been unconsciously broadcasting information to Štěpánek. Štěpánek was never prevented from handling the materials, which opened many possibilities for him to find out information through tactile and other such means. A later study, in 1990, failed to indicate any ability to identify events at a level greater than chance.

== Other findings ==
It was also observed in early studies that, when the envelopes in which the cards were concealed were reused, Štěpánek – seemingly without his conscious knowledge – started to give the same response (either green or white) to particular envelopes. It was concluded that some subtle differences between the envelopes were biasing Štěpánek's responses. This was controlled by next enclosing the enveloped cards within other covers, and eventually several more covers. Parapsychologists were surprised the effect failed to disappear; however, the effect completely disappeared when the envelopes were put inside a rigid box, and Štěpánek was never prevented from handling the objects, which critics claim as evidence that tactile stimuli were creeping through.
