= Charles Tart =

American psychologist and parapsychologist (1937–2025)

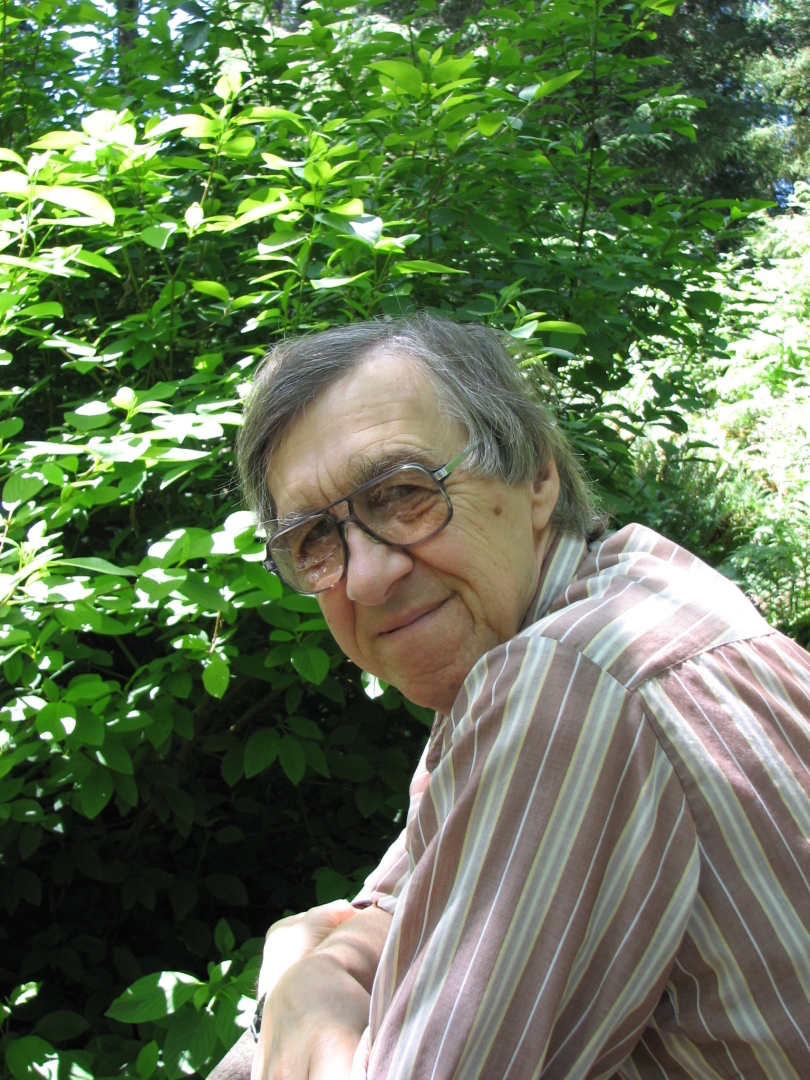
- Born: April 29, 1937; Morrisville, Bucks County, Pennsylvania, U.S.
- Died: March 5, 2025 (aged 87)
- Occupations: Psychologist and author
- Known for: Altered states of consciousness

Charles T. Tart (April 29, 1937 – March 5, 2025) was an American psychologist and parapsychologist known for his psychological work on the nature of consciousness (particularly altered states of consciousness), for being one of the founders of transpersonal psychology, and for his research in parapsychology.

== Life and career ==
Charles Tart was born on April 29, 1937, in Morrisville, Pennsylvania, and grew up in Trenton, New Jersey. He was active in amateur radio and worked as a radio engineer (with a First Class Radiotelephone License from the Federal Communications Commission) while a teenager. As an undergraduate, Tart first studied electrical engineering at the Massachusetts Institute of Technology before transferring to Duke University to study psychology under J. B. Rhine. He received his PhD in psychology from the University of North Carolina at Chapel Hill in 1963, and then completed postdoctoral research in hypnosis under Ernest R. Hilgard at Stanford University. He was a professor of psychology at University of California, Davis for 28 years.

His first books, Altered States of Consciousness (editor, 1969) and Transpersonal Psychologies (1975), became widely used texts that were instrumental in allowing these areas to become part of modern psychology. As of 2005, he was a core faculty member at the Institute of Transpersonal Psychology (Palo Alto, California), a senior research fellow of the Institute of Noetic Sciences (Sausalito, California), a professor emeritus of psychology at the UC Davis, and emeritus member of the Monroe Institute board of advisors. Tart was the holder of the Bigelow Chair of Consciousness Studies at the University of Nevada in Las Vegas and served as a visiting professor in East-West Psychology at the California Institute of Integral Studies, as an instructor in psychiatry at the School of Medicine of the University of Virginia, and a consultant on government funded parapsychological research at the Stanford Research Institute (now known as SRI International).

Tart was also integral in the theorizing and construction of the automatic ESP testing device called the ESPATESTER machine that was built at the University of Virginia. He supported Joseph McMoneagle's claim of having remote viewed into the past, present, and future, and having predicted future events.

Tart was a student of the Japanese martial art of Aikido (in which he holds a black belt), of meditation, of George Gurdjieff's work, of Buddhism, and of other psychological and spiritual growth disciplines. Tart believes that the evidence of the paranormal is bringing science and spirit together. His primary goal is to build bridges between the scientific and spiritual communities, and to help bring about a refinement and integration of Western and Eastern approaches for knowing the world and for personal and social growth.

In his 1986 book Waking Up, he introduced the phrase "consensus trance" to the lexicon. Tart likened normal waking consciousness to hypnotic trance. He discussed how each of us is from birth inducted to the trance of the society around us. Tart noted both similarities and differences between hypnotic trance induction and consensus trance induction. He emphasized the enormous and pervasive power of parents, teachers, religious leaders, political figures, and others to compel induction. Referring to the work of Gurdjieff and others he outlines a path to awakening based upon self-observation.

Tart died at home on March 5, 2025, at the age of 87.

== OBE experiment ==
In 1968, Tart conducted an out-of-body experience (OBE) experiment with a subject known as Miss Z for four non-consecutive nights in his sleep laboratory. Miss Z was attached to an EEG machine. A randomly-selected five-digit number was placed on a shelf five-and-a-half feet above her bed. Miss Z reported three partial OBEs and two full OBEs over the fourth not. She did not claim to see the number on the first three nights but on the fourth gave the number correctly.

During the experiment Tart monitored the equipment in the next room, behind an observation window; however, he admitted he had occasionally dozed during the night. The psychologists Leonard Zusne and Warren Jones have written that the possibility of the subject having obtained the number through ordinary sensory means was not ruled out during the experiment. For example, when light fell on the code it was reflected from the surface of a clock located on the wall above the shelf. The subject was not constantly observed and it was also suggested she may have read the number when she was being attached to the EEG machine. According to the magician Milbourne Christopher: "If she had held a mirror with a handle in her right hand, by tilting the mirror and looking up she could have seen a reflection of the paper on the shelf... The woman had not been searched prior to the experiment, nor had an observer been in the sleep chamber with her — precautions that should have been taken."

The psychologist James Alcock criticized the experiment for inadequate controls and questioned why the subject was not visually monitored by a video camera. Martin Gardner has written the experiment was not evidence for an OBE and suggested that whilst Tart was "snoring behind the window, Miss Z simply stood up in bed, without detaching the electrodes, and peeked." Susan Blackmore wrote: "If Miss Z had tried to climb up, the brain-wave record would have showed a pattern of interference. And that was exactly what it did show." However, Tart noted that the electrodes "did not allow her to sit up more than two feet without disconnecting the wires from the box," and the target was "six and a half feet off the floor or higher," and the EEG during the reported OBE was unlike the typical EEG of either the waking state or the dream state.

The experiment was not repeated at the laboratory. Tart wrote this was because Miss Z moved from the area where the laboratory was located.

== Reception ==
Tart drew criticism from the scientific community for his comments on a failed psychokinesis (PK) experiment. The targets from the random number generator that were used in the experiment were not random. Tart responded by claiming the nonrandomness was due to a PK effect. Terence Hines has written that a procedural flaw in the experiment itself was used by Tart as evidence for psi and that this is an example of the use of a nonfalsifiable hypothesis in parapsychology.

In 1980, Tart claimed that a rejudging of the transcripts from one of Russell Targ and Harold Puthoff’s remote viewing experiments revealed an above-chance result. Targ and Puthoff refused to provide copies of the transcripts and it was not until July 1985 that they were made available for study when it was discovered they still contained sensory cues. The psychologist David Marks and Christopher Scott (1986) wrote "considering the importance for the remote viewing hypothesis of adequate cue removal, Tart’s failure to perform this basic task seems beyond comprehension. As previously concluded, remote viewing has not been demonstrated in the experiments conducted by Puthoff and Targ, only the repeated failure of the investigators to remove sensory cues."

Tart has also been criticized by the skeptic Robert Todd Carroll for ignoring Occam's razor (advocating the paranormal instead of naturalistic explanations) and for ignoring the known laws of physics.

Tart's book about marijuana On Being Stoned has received mixed reviews. Harris Chaiklin wrote that the book rejected medical evidence and laboratory experiments in favor for the opinions of marijuana users and probability statistics were inappropriately used. In his book Learning to Use Extrasensory Perception, Tart endorsed experimental methods from learning theory and the results from card guessing experiments in support for ESP. Richard Land wrote that Tart's data was unconvincing but concluded "the book will be enjoyed by believers in ESP, and sceptics will regard it as a curiosity".

In 1981, Tart received the James Randi Educational Foundation Media Pigasus Award "for discovering that the further in the future events are, the more difficult it is to predict them."

Dean Radin identified Tart's "most important contributions" to parapsychology as "the necessity of selecting participants for talent, the need for immediate feedback in psi training, the discovery of transtemporal inhibition, the value of psychophysiological measures, and his analysis of the fear of psi."

== Publications ==
- Altered States of Consciousness (1969), editor. ISBN 0-471-84560-4
- Transpersonal Psychologies (1975)
- On Being Stoned: A Psychological Study of Marijuana Intoxication (1971)
- States of Consciousness (1975)
- Symposium on Consciousness (1975) With P. Lee, R. Ornstein, D. Galin & A. Deikman
- Learning to Use Extrasensory Perception (1976)
- Psi: Scientific Studies of the Psychic Realm (1977)
- Mind at Large: Institute of Electrical and Electronics Engineers Symposia on the Nature of Extrasensory Perception (1979, with Harold E. Puthoff and Russell Targ)
- Waking Up: Overcoming the Obstacles to Human Potential (1986)
- Open Mind, Discriminating Mind: Reflections on Human Possibilities (1989)
- Living the Mindful Life (1994)
- Body Mind Spirit: Exploring the Parapsychology of Spirituality (1997)
- Mind Science: Meditation Training for Practical People (2001)
- States of Consciousness (2001). ISBN 0-595-15196-5
- The End of Materialism: How Evidence of the Paranormal is Bringing Science and Spirit Together (2009) ISBN 978-1572246454

== Awards ==
- Distinguished Contributions to Scientific Hypnosis, The Society of Psychological Hypnosis (Division 30 of the American Psychological Association), 2001.
- Abraham Maslow Award (given to an individual for an outstanding and lasting contribution to the exploration of the farther reaches of human spirit), The Society for Humanistic Psychology (Division 32 of APA), 2004.
- Charles Honorton Integrative Contributions Award, Parapsychological Association, 2008.
