= Rhine Research Center =

- Rhine logo, featuring Zener cards
- Parent institution: Duke University (formerly)
- Founders: Joseph Banks Rhine, William McDougall (psychologist)
- Established: 1935; 91 years ago
- Formerly called: Duke Parapsychology Laboratory; Institute of Parapsychology; Foundation for Research on the Nature of Man
- Location: Durham, North Carolina
- Website: https://www.rhineonline.org

The Rhine Research Center is an independent, non-profit parapsychology research center based in Durham, North Carolina. The Rhine Center's stated mission is "to advance the science of parapsychology, to provide education and resources for the public, and to foster a community for individuals with personal and professional interest in PSI." It is the successor to the original Duke University Parapsychology Laboratory established in the 1930s. The original laboratory introduced the term "parapsychology" and initiated the professionalization of the study as a form of experimental psychology.

== History ==
=== J.B. and Louisa Rhine ===
Joseph Banks Rhine and his wife Louisa E. Rhine were originally trained as botanists at the University of Chicago. After hearing a lecture by British writer Sir Arthur Conan Doyle on mediumship and spiritualism, J.B. Rhine inquired into the feasibility of replicable, scientific experiments into the paranormal. The Rhines left botany to study under Walter Franklin Prince of the Boston Society of Psychic Research. In 1927, J.B. and Louisa co-authored an article which accused well-known spiritualist medium Mina Crandon of engaging in fraud. Doyle was a fan of Crandon and wrote a spirited defense in a Boston newspaper; the ensuing controversy lent itself to notoriety for the Rhines within the world of American psychical research.

=== Duke University ===
J.B. Rhine conducting a dice experiment with a subject, 1954

The earliest scientific or academic studies of paranormal phenomena were conducted in the 1880s by London's Society for Psychical Research and in the 1910s at Stanford University by J.E. Coover. Duke University became the second major U.S. academic institution to engage in this research following the hiring of William McDougall. In 1927, McDougall left Harvard University to join Duke's Department of Psychology and Philosophy as a professor and head of the department; J.B. Rhine accompanied him as his researcher. Rhine himself was promoted to a professorship in 1929 with the support of Duke's then-President William Preston Few. Together, Rhine and McDougall initially conducted experiments on postmortem survival, telepathy, and clairvoyance. National attention to their ESP research came as a result of Rhine publishing Extrasensory Perception (1934) and New Frontiers of the Mind (1937).

In 1930, McDougall and Rhine established a specialized Parapsychology Laboratory; around 1935, it was provided financial support and became known as the Parapsychology Laboratory of Duke University. The Laboratory began publishing the Journal of Parapsychology in April 1937. Louisa Rhine joined as a full-time researcher in 1948. Other researchers included Karl Zener, after whom Zener cards were named; J. Gaither Pratt, Helmut Schmidt, and William G. Roll. The Laboratory was located within the West Duke Building on East Campus from the 1930s until 1965.

=== Disaffiliation from Duke ===
Upon J.B. Rhine's retirement from Duke in 1965, the organization disaffiliated from the university. It was reorganized as the Institute of Parapsychology under the auspices of an independent non-profit organization established as the Foundation for Research on the Nature of Man (FRNM). The Institute of Parapsychology was then headquartered in the Duke-Wannamaker House at 402 N. Buchanan Avenue, directly across from campus, from 1965 until 2002.

== Present day ==
The FRNM was renamed the Rhine Research Center in 1995 to commemorate the centenary of founder J. B. Rhine's birth. In 2002, the organization's building was sold to Duke University and the Rhine Research Center relocated to an office building near the Duke University Hospital.

The contemporary Rhine Research Center continues the work that originated with the Duke Parapsychology Laboratory and the FRNM. In addition to conducting parapsychological research, the Center provides online courses, presents at educational events, and holds in-person and virtual meetings for people interested in parapsychology and psychic phenomena.

As of 2026, the organization's president is Loyd Auerbach.
