= Extrasensory Perception (book) =

1934 book by Joseph Banks Rhine

- Cover
- Author: J. B. Rhine
- Subject: ESP
- Published: 1934
- Pages: 240 pp.
- OCLC: 653398

Extrasensory Perception is a 1934 book written by parapsychologist Joseph Banks Rhine, which discusses his research work at Duke University. Extrasensory perception is the ability to acquire information shielded from the senses, and the book was "of such a scope and of such promise as to revolutionize psychical research and to make its title literally a household phrase".

== Reception ==
The book received worldwide attention and became the focus of criticism and controversy when some objections were raised about the validity of Rhine's work. The parapsychology experiments described by Rhine received much criticism from academics and others who challenged the concepts and evidence of ESP. A number of psychological departments attempted to repeat Rhine's experiments with failure. W. S. Cox (1936) from Princeton University with 132 subjects produced 25,064 trials in a playing card ESP experiment. Cox concluded, "There is no evidence of extrasensory perception either in the 'average man' or of the group investigated or in any particular individual of that group. The discrepancy between these results and those obtained by Rhine is due either to uncontrollable factors in experimental procedure or to the difference in the subjects."

Four other psychological departments failed to replicate Rhine's results. Rhine's experiments were discredited due to the discovery that sensory leakage or cheating could account for all his results, such as the subject being able to read the symbols from the back of the cards and being able to see and hear the experimenter to note subtle clues.

=== Extrasensory Perception After Sixty Years ===
In response, Rhine published Extrasensory Perception After Sixty Years in 1940 with a number of colleagues, to address the objections raised. However, critics have written the experiments described by Rhine and his colleagues contained methodological flaws. In the book Rhine and his colleagues described three experiments; the Pearce-Pratt experiment, the Pratt-Woodruff experiment and the Ownbey-Zirkle series, which they believed demonstrated ESP. The psychologist C. E. M. Hansel wrote, "it is now known that each experiment contained serious flaws that escaped notice in the examination made by the authors of Extra-Sensory Perception After Sixty Years". Joseph Gaither Pratt was the co-experimenter in the Pearce-Pratt and Pratt-Woodruff experiments at the Duke campus. Hansel visited the campus where the experiments took place and discovered the results could have originated through the use of a trick, so could not be regarded as supplying evidence for ESP.

The Ownbey-Zirkle ESP experiment at Duke was criticized by parapsychologists and skeptics. Ownbey would attempt to send ESP symbols to Zirkle who would guess what they were. The pair were placed in adjacent rooms unable to see each other and an electric fan was used to prevent the pair communicating by sensory cues. Ownbey tapped a telegraph key to Zirkle to inform him when she was trying to send him a symbol. The door separating the two rooms was open during the experiment, and after each guess Zirkle would call out his guess to Ownbey who recorded his choice. Critics pointed out the experiment was flawed as Ownbey acted as both the sender and the experimenter, nobody was controlling the experiment so Ownbey could have cheated by communicating with Zirkle or made recording mistakes.

Psychologist Carl Jung referred to Rhine's work as scientific proof that part of the psyche is not subject to the laws of space and time.

== See also ==
- Parapsychology: Frontier Science of the Mind (1957), book by J. B. Rhine and J. G. Pratt
