= James Charles Crumbaugh =

American psychologist and parapsychologist

James Charles Crumbaugh (1912-2001) was an American psychologist and parapsychologist.

Crumbaugh was born in Terrell, Texas. He received his bachelor's degree from Baylor University. He became interested in parapsychology starting in 1938 which led to a Master's thesis at Southern Methodist University. He received his Ph.D. from the University of Texas in 1953.

Crumbaugh who worked with the Parapsychology Foundation, carried out experiments into extrasensory perception. However, his results were negative. After thousands of card runs he failed to duplicate the results of Joseph Banks Rhine.

== Publications ==
- Logotherapy: New Help for Problem Drinkers with William Martin Wood, William Chadwick Wood (1980)
- Everything to Gain: A Guide to Self-Fulfillment Through Logoanalysis (1988)
- A Primer of Projective Techniques of Psychological Assessment (1989)
- Crumbaugh, James Charles. (1966). A Scientific Critique of Parapsychology. International Journal of Neuropsychiatry 5: 521–29.
