= Elizabeth A. McMahan =

American entomologist (1924–2009)

- Born: May 5, 1924; Pino, North Carolina, US
- Died: 2009 (aged 84–85); Chapel Hill, North Carolina, US
- Education: Duke University, University of Hawaiʻi
- Known for: Study of termites and assassin bugs
- Awards: Award of Excellence, North Carolina Entomological Society
- Scientific career
- Fields: Entomology, psychology, children's literature
- Workplaces: University of North Carolina at Chapel Hill, College of Agriculture, Port Antonio, Jamaica
- Thesis: (1960)

Elizabeth Anne McMahan (1924—2009), known as Betty, was a Professor in the Department of Biology at the University of North Carolina at Chapel Hill for 26 years. She had a distinguished and varied career as an entomologist, psychologist, cartoonist, writer of children's books, and world traveler. She worked in the parapsychology lab of J. B. Rhine at Duke for several years, but left for graduate work in entomology at the University of Hawaiʻi and subsequent research on the feeding, foraging, and social behavior of termites and some of their associate and predator species. Her field work in entomology took her to Puerto Rico, Costa Rica, Panama, Venezuela, Ecuador, Australia, and India. Two insect species were named for her: the assassin bug Salyavata mcmahanae and the beetle Neophilotermes mcmahanae.

== Selected publications ==
=== Entomology ===
- McMahan, E.A. (1996) "Termites", in The Food Web of a Tropical Rain Forest, Ed D.P. Reagan & R.B. Wade, University of Chicago Press, pages 110–135
- Jones, S.C., Nalepa, C.A., McMahan E.A., Torres, J.A. (1995) "Survey and ecological studies of the termites (Isoptera:Kalotermitidae) of Mona Island", Florida Entomologist 78: pages pages 305–313
- McMahan, E.A. (1986) "Beneficial aspects of termites", in Economic Impacts and Control of Social Insects, Ed S.B. Vinson, Praeger Press, pages 144–164
- McMahan, E.A. (1983) "Adaptations, feeding preferences, and biometrics of a termite-baiting assassin bug (Hemiptera, Reduviidae)", Annals of the Entomological Society of America 76: pages 483–486
- McMahan, E.A. (1970) "Polyethism in workers of Nasutitermes costalis (Holmgren)", Insectes Sociaux, 17: pages 113–120
- McMahan, E.A. (1963) "A study of termite feeding relationships, Using radioisotopes", Annals of the Entomological Society of America 58: pages 74–82
- McMahan, E.A. (1962) "Laboratory studies of colony establishment and development in Cryptotermes brevis(Walker) (Isoptera: Kalotermitidae)", Proceedings of the Hawaiian Entomological Society 18: pages 145–153
- McMagan, E.A., Gray I.E. (1957) "Variation in a local population of the dragonfly Helocordulia", Annals of the Entomological Society of America 50: pages 62–66

=== Entomology, for the layman ===
- McMahan, E.A. (2005) "Adventures documenting an assassin bug that "fishes" for termites", American Entomologist 51: 202–207
- McMahan, E.A. (1983) "Bugs angle for termites", Natural History Magazine 92: 40–47

=== Parapsychology ===
- McMahan, E.A. (1947) "A review of the evidence for dowsing", Journal of Parapsychology 11: 175-?
- McMahan, E.A. (1946) "An experiment in pure telepathy", Journal of Parapsychology 10: 224-?

=== Children's books ===
- McMahan, E.A. (2000) Cammie, A Girl for All Seasons
- McMahan, E.A. (2001) Raising Cane with Cammie
- McMahan, E.A. (2002) Cammie Turns Ten, ISBN 9780759688612
