= Loyd Auerbach =

Mentalist and parapsychologist

- Born: Loyd Auerbach
- Occupations: parapsychologist, paranormal investigator, author, educator, mentalist, chocolatier, research consultant
- Organization: Rhine Research Center
- Known for: parapsychology, ghost hunting, mentalism

Loyd Auerbach is a parapsychologist, paranormal investigator, and mentalist. He has appeared on television shows that profile ghost hunting and other paranormal topics and is the author of several books on ghost hunting, parapsychology, and other paranormal subjects as well as co-author of the Raney/Day Investigation novels. He was a columnist for Fate magazine. As a mentalist, he performs under the name "Professor Paranormal". He is also a chocolatier offering chocolate tasting classes and products through his website Haunted By Chocolate. As of 2026, he serves as the President of the Board of the Rhine Research Center in Durham, North Carolina.

== Early life and education ==
Loyd Auerbach is the son of Barbara Auerbach and Richard “Dick” Auerbach, the latter a longtime producer and executive at NBC Sports and independent producer of the Rose Bowl Game and Tournament of Roses Parade.

Auerbach has had an interest in the paranormal and psychic phenomena from an early age. Growing up, he watched The Twilight Zone and One Step Beyond television shows and held séances. Auerbach helped start a parapsychology club at his high school and did an informal internship with a parapsychologist who lived close to him in Westchester County, NY before moving to California. Auerbach believes in the parapsychological world because he has experienced what he says are two out-of-body experiences in which he dreamed he was in another place and his image was seen in that place by friends.

Auerbach graduated from Northwestern University in 1978 with a degree in Cultural Anthropology and earned a Master’s Degree in Parapsychology from the former John F. Kennedy University (now National University (California)).

== Career ==
=== Parapsychology ===
Loyd Auerbach was on the Core Faculty of the Graduate Parapsychology Program at John F. Kennedy University where he received a Master's Degree in parapsychology. While on the faculty, he served as the Public Information and Media Consultant to the American Society for Psychical Research (1982–83) working as a consultant on psychic matters and conducting investigations into paranormal occurrences. Auerbach says he gained attention in 1984 due to the popularity of the 1984 film Ghostbusters.

Auerbach has been the owner and director of the Office of Paranormal Investigations since 1989, investigating ghost sightings, demon possessions, hauntings and other unexplained phenomena. According to Auerbach, ghosts fall under three categories: poltergeists, which he has explained as the energy of a living person causing things to move, apparitions, which are believed to be the spirits of the deceased, and hauntings, which he has described as psychic imprints on the environment. The office focuses more on research than profit, charging fees to cover funding for the research and lend legitimacy.

Auerbach has described himself akin to a psychiatrist who deals with psychic phenomena, stating that most ghosts and poltergeists are not real entities, but rather psychic phenomena. Auerbach has expressed irritation that more money has been spent for psychics than serious parapsychological research, such as extrasensory perception, telekinesis, and the mind surviving physical death. Auerbach believes that if spirits are stuck between worlds, they should be helped.

Some better-known paranormal cases Auerbach has investigated include a ghost of a little girl haunting The Brookdale Lodge in Felton, California, the legend of a ghostly Blue Lady at the Moss Beach Distillery in California, The USS Hornet with apparitions of dead sailors, and the Toys R Us in Sunnyvale, California where Auerbach found that toys that moved and fell on their own were due to trucks driven on the street. Regarding Auerbach's investigation of the USS Hornet, Patrick O'Reilly, a psychologist and member of the Bay Area Skeptics, believes the ghost stories about the Hornet are imaginary, fueled by power of suggestion giving the ship an interesting history to lure more visitors and increase business. Auerbach himself has said ghosts are good for business. According to Auerbach, technology used for ghost hunting can provide some clues, but he has been skeptical about the reliance on such technology and believes that someone with psychic abilities is better suited to ghost hunting. However, skeptic Joe Nickell, a senior fellow at the Center for Inquiry, has found natural phenomena to explain all the evidence ghost hunters have provided him on various devises used in their investigations.

=== Faculty and advisory boards ===
Auerbach serves on advisory boards for various institutions related to parapsychology and mediumship: the Rhine Research Center, whose mission is to advance the science of parapsychology, provide education and resources, and foster a community for individuals interested in PSI, the Windbridge Research Center, whose mission is to ease fear about death and what comes next by performing research and sharing the results with the public, clinicians, scientists and practitioners such as mediums, and the Scientific Advisory Board of the Forever Family Foundation whose mission is to establish the continuity of the family after a member has died, and to financially support the research into Afterlife Science. Auerbach is also the Coordinator for the annual Meeting of the Minds convention for the Psychic Entertainment Association, an international organization with a serious interest in the ethical performance of psychic entertainment, in which he was past President and former member of the Board of Directors.

Auerbach is on the Core Faculty of the Graduate Parapsychology Program at the former John F. Kennedy University and teaches online courses relating to parapsychology at Atlantic University. Kenny Biddle, the Chief Investigator at the Center for Inquiry, has pointed out that certificates or diplomas in the paranormal field are dubious since most such programs are not accredited. Auerbach has responded that the only accredited university in the United States to give a degree in parapsychology was John F. Kennedy University from 1977-1987 and currently there are no accredited universities offering degrees in parapsychology in the U.S.

=== Notable appearances and works ===
Auerbach has appeared in numerous radio, podcast and print interviews pertaining to parapsychology and ghost hunting. His many national television appearances spanning decades include the Netflix series Surviving Death, The UnXplained, Ghost Adventures, Sightings, In Search of..., Unsolved Mysteries as well as The Oprah Winfrey Show, Larry King Live, The View, The Today Show, Late Night with David Letterman, and ESPN's SportsCenter.

Auerbach was a columnist and consulting editor for Fate Magazine (1991-2004). Auerbach has written several books on paranormal subjects including parapsychology, psychic abilities, ghost hunting and out-of-body experiences and is also the co-author of the Rayne Day Investigation novels.

=== Other professions ===
Auerbach is a professional mentalist and magician doing sleight-of-hand tricks performing as Professor Paranormal, touring on the club circuit under his act Professor Paranormal's Psychic Mind Theater.

Auerbach's other occupations include chocolatier, offering guided chocolate tasting sessions through his website Haunted by Chocolate and is a research consultant for LexisNexis. As of 2026, he also serves as President of the Board of the Rhine Research Center.

== Publications ==
=== Non fiction ===
- ESP, Hauntings, and Poltergeists : A Parapsychologist's Handbook (1986, ISBN 9780446349512)
- Psychic Dreaming: A Parapsychologist's Handbook (1991, ISBN 9780446360562)
- Reincarnation, Channeling and Possession: A Parapsychologist's Handbook (1993, ISBN 9780446363334)
- Mind Over Matter (1996, ISBN 9781575660479)
- Ghost Hunting: How to Investigate the Paranormal (2003, ISBN 978-1579510671)
- Hauntings & Poltergeists: A Ghost Hunter's Guide (2004, ISBN 978-1579510725)
- A Paranormal Casebook: Ghost Hunting in the New Millennium (2005, ISBN 9781933177045)
- The Ghost Detectives' Guide to Haunted San Francisco (with Annette Martin) (2011, ISBN 978-1610350075)
- ESP WARS: East and West (with Edwin C. May, Victor Rubel and Joseph W. McMoneagle) (2015,ISBN 9781941408797)
- Self-Publishing: It Ain't Rocket Science: A Practical Guide to Writing, Publishing, and Promoting a Book (with Richard Wren) (2015, ISBN 978-1519277862)
- Psychic Dreaming: Dreamworking, Reincarnation, Out-of-Body Experiences & Clairvoyance (2017, ISBN 978-0738751702)

=== Fiction ===
- Near Death: A Raney/Daye Investigation (with Rich Hosek and Arnold Rudnick) (2020, ISBN 978-1953566003)
- After Life: A Raney/Day Investigation 2 (with Rich Hosek and Arnold Rudnick) (2023, ISBN 978-1953566058)
