= Parapsychology: Frontier Science of the Mind =

1957 parapsychology book

- Author: Joseph Banks Rhine; Joseph Gaither Pratt
- Subject: Parapsychology
- Publisher: Thomas
- Publication date: 1957
- Pages: 220 pp.
- OCLC: 179209

Parapsychology: Frontier Science of the Mind is a book by Joseph Banks Rhine and Joseph Gaither Pratt, originally published in 1957. It is a textbook and reference work which provides an introduction to the field of parapsychology, which discusses "methods for testing, tables for evaluation, reading lists, and other research aids".

Parapsychology: Frontier Science of the Mind has been reviewed in The Philosophical Review, Philosophy East and West, and the Southern Medical Journal.

Gregg Dougherty in a review wrote "the book as a whole is clearly and rather quietly written" but noted that there is "no attempt to argue with or convince the extremely skeptical reader."

== See also ==
- Extra-Sensory Perception (1934), book by J. B. Rhine
- Varieties of Anomalous Experience
