= Gardner Murphy =

American psychologist

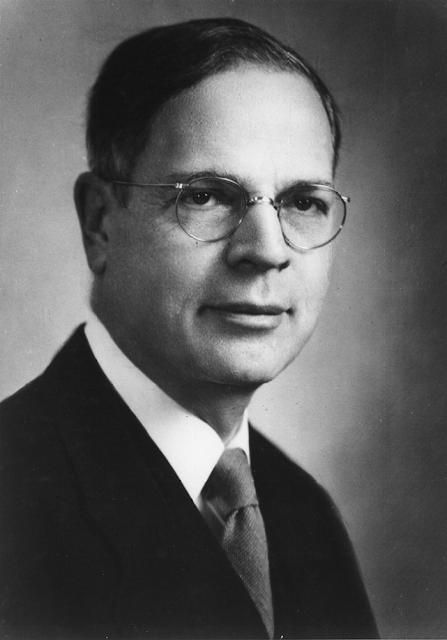
- Born: July 8, 1895; Chillicothe, Ohio, United States of America
- Died: March 18, 1979 (aged 83)
- Occupations: Psychologist, psychical researcher
- Spouse: Lois Barclay

Gardner Murphy (July 8, 1895 – March 18, 1979) was an American psychologist who specialized in social and personality psychology and parapsychology. His career highlights include serving as president of the American Psychological Association and the British Society for Psychical Research.

== Biography ==
=== Family life and education ===
Murphy was born on July 8, 1895, in Chillicothe, Ohio, US. He was the son of Edgar Gardner Murphy, an Episcopal minister and activist. Upon graduating with a BA from Yale University in 1916, Murphy attended Harvard University, working with L. T. Troland in a telepathy experiment, and achieving his MA in 1917. Murphy succeeded Troland as holder of the Hodgson Fellowship in Psychical Research at Harvard University. After the first world war, in 1919, Murphy continued his studies at Columbia University, working towards his PhD, which he was awarded in 1923. During this time he was also working under the Hodgson Fellowship. He later married Lois Barclay and had two children, Al and Margaret.

Murphy was recognized for being generous and kind, such as by offering assistance or loans if a student or colleague was in trouble. He also spoke out against racial conflicts and advocated for peaceful relations.

=== Inspiration ===
Murphy was inspired by the work of psychologists and scientists such as Herbert Spencer, Sigmund Freud, William James, and Charles Darwin. Most of his works integrated aspects of each of these previous scientists. Murphy was a strong admirer of Freud, often drawing from his psychoanalytic theories. He considered Freud a true artistic genius while also remaining capable of taking a critical view. Murphy was especially interested in Freud's perspective of the self, including regression and needs. The world was skeptical of Freud at the time, yet Murphy still embraced his ideas, even when encountering ridicule.

While researching William James, Murphy took interest in James' philosophical perspective. He admired how James easily defined the boundaries between man, the world, and consciousness. Along with James and Freud, Murphy also took to Darwin, specifically his theory of evolution. Murphy became particularly focused on the theory of behavioral adaption in organisms, which posits that animals adapt to their environments for their own survival. This particular theory of evolutionary adaption was woven into multiple personality theories later presented by Murphy.

=== Career ===
Murphy studied the medium Leonora Piper and collaborated with French chemist René Warcollier on a transatlantic telepathy experiment. From 1921 to 1925, he lectured in psychology at Columbia University. In 1925, at a psychical research symposium at Clark University, Murphy and Harvard psychologist William McDougall advocated for the academic study of telepathy, while acknowledging scientific skepticism due to past debunking efforts. From 1925 to 1929, Murphy was an instructor and assistant professor at Columbia. He became the Hodgson Fellow at Harvard in 1937 and served as professor and chairman of psychology at City College, New York, from 1940 to 1942. In 1952, he became director of research at the Menninger Foundation in Topeka, Kansas.

Murphy was elected to the presidency of the American Psychological Association in 1944. He subsequently served as the President of the British Society for Psychical Research in 1949 (which he joined in 1917) and was Director of the Parapsychology Foundation in 1951. Murphy authored several texts in psychology, including, Historical Introduction to Modern Psychology (1928; 1949), Personality (1947), and Human Potentialities (1958). He was a contributor to personality, social and clinical psychology and an early exponent of humanistic psychology. During these years, Murphy continued his association with psychical research, including sitting on the council of the American Society for Psychical Research, and serving as chair of its research committee; serving as an editor of the Journal of Parapsychology (1939–1941), speaking at professional symposium on psychical research; writing reports, reviews, and critical articles in general scientific, psychological, as well as parapsychological journals. He also supported (through his own book royalties) experimental studies by J. G. Pratt at Columbia (1935–1937); authoring an introductory review to the field, The Challenge of Psychical Research (1961), as well as William James and Psychical Research (1973) (with R. Ballou), and a 20-page article on parapsychology for the Encyclopedia of Psychology (1946); editing an English-language publication of Warcollier's reports (1938) and writing forewords for several parapsychological monographs.

Murphy died on 18 March 1979 in Washington, D.C.

== Contributions to psychology ==
=== Social psychology ===
Murphy proposed the biosocial personality theory, in which personality is understood as both biological and social in nature. At the center of the theory is the term "canalization." Murphy used "canalization" to indicate that human needs may be impacted or changed by what, when and how they are satisfied. In Murphy's model, two primary mechanisms impact human need: regularity, and relevance. The theory was presented in his book Personality published in 1947.

In Personality, Murphy proposed three main components to personality. First, personality acts within a larger structure, and second, has its own inner workings. Third, personality is shaped by its environment. Other parts of the book discuss his biosocial theory canalization and autism. Autism, as Murphy depicts it, is actions designed by the satisfaction of needs while placing special emphasis on the self.

Murphy also studied parapsychology, which at the time was not taken seriously. Many thought it was a joke and should not be considered a real science. Murphy thought differently. He believed that it is the scientist's job to expand the known science and push beyond the set boundaries. He produced numerous studies on the paranormal, specifically about telekinesis, psychokinesis, and despite constant ridicule.

=== Humanistic psychology ===
The humanistic psychology movement did not occur until the 1960s. However, much of Murphy's writings were an early component of the movement and really set the stage for its beginnings. Generally, Murphy believed in the good of humanity, often producing works on the problems and solutions of societies, human nature, and individualism. These particular works were so inspiring that, at the time, many European refugee psychologists referenced his ideas in their arguments for peace in their countries.

Murphy's book Human Potentialities (1958) covered a wide range of topics about the welfare of the human being. In general, Murphy rejected the idea of human nature being predetermined and unable to change. Instead he proposed three distinct human natures. First, because of the theory of evolution, human nature is in a constant state of flux, and therefore, always changing. Second, man's various cultures were brought about by the instability of human nature. Finally, man has an essential artistic view of the world that allows for the expansion of its boundaries. These human natures were essential to his idea of human potentiality and prejudices. Prejudices are formed because of man's constant state of flux. Researching these ideas, Murphy concluded that prejudices did not exist because of logical reasoning. Rather, prejudices come about through natural spontaneous reactions. With that in mind, Murphy suggested three principles when researching human potential. Firstly, the environment plays a role in the individuals' ideas of gaining experience. Second potentialities are created through new experiences of the self rather than through cultural experience. He concludes that there is no limit to the number of new potentialities that can be created.

He also published papers focusing on the boundaries between the individual, society, and world order. Murphy identified what he believed to be the source of conflict: individualism. He believed too much emphasis was placed on the definition of individualism; so much so that the true definition has been replaced by the idea of competition. In other words, the idea of winning and losing. Individualism only allows the person to view what is in their direct view, not the big picture. The idea of competition is non societal; it takes care of the individual and their needs, but not the needs of society.

Murphy wrote Science and World Order (1962) in an effort to address societal problems. He proposed ten ideas that he considered beneficial, despite their radical nature. First, he proposed the idea of disarmament. Instead of weaponry, he suggested using common knowledge to come to an understanding. Second, he proposed that newer technology would enable less reliability on weapons. In recommendations three, four, and five, Murphy suggested using different research methods to study the paths, decisions, and predictions that lead to war. In his last four recommendations, Murphy suggested studying politicians' personalities to better handle situational crises. He also suggested updating the educational system to fully include a firm understanding of the world and what is at stake; while also promoting more communication techniques to better understand adversaries.

Later within his career he served as a consultant to the Indian Government researching solutions to the Hindu-Muslim conflict. During this time, he gained knowledge of the local cultures and personalities of the native people. His time there led him to collect numerous data of Indian cultures and life incorporating the data into solutions for western problems. This work became known as Asian Psychology.

=== Other notable works and theories ===
Murphy had many prominent theories and ideas throughout his lifetime. Before his ideas of social psychology, Murphy bounced around different learning theories and ideas, building off of what was already known. His learning theories are a good example. Murphy believed that perception is learned the same way as behaviors, through reward and punishment. Murphy believed that perception fulfills multiple roles beyond relaying the sensory information to the brain. It was a way of fulfilling needs as well. This satisfaction of needs is displayed in many of his other publications.

== Reception ==
Murphy's Historical Introduction to Modern Psychology (1929) received a positive review in the British Medical Journal which stated "no purely objective record could be as successful as Dr. Gardner Murphy's presentation of the history, which bears evidence everywhere of a judicious choice of material and of such emphasis as is free from any prepossession." Edwin Boring described it as "an exceptionally good book". The 1949 revised edition received a mixed review by Alphonse Chapanis in The Quarterly Review of Biology who wrote the book did not present a balanced synopsis of research but recommended it as a "useful addition to the psychologist's library". However, Ralph H. Turner wrote Murphy maintained an "exceptional order of objectivity through most of his presentation" and described it as "a very useful text".

Murphy's introductory psychological textbook An Introduction to Psychology (1951) received positive reviews. Alastair Heron described it as a "textbook for the interested and not-too-sophisticated reader who hopes to become more interested without becoming at the same time more sophisticated."

In his book Challenge of Psychical Research (1961), Murphy documented research into clairvoyance, precognition, psychokinesis, and telepathy. John L. Kennedy wrote there was inadequate information about the role of the experimenter during psychical research experiments. Ralph W. Gerard gave the book a positive review but stated the results from the experiments may be explainable by alternative factors such as misinterpretation or unintended cues without recourse to the paranormal.

Psychologist L. Börje Löfgren heavily criticized the Challenge of Psychical Research stating that Murphy hardly ever considered the "possibility that spontaneous occurrences might actually be memory falsifications (conscious or unconscious), simple lies, or similar phenomena." He concluded his review by suggesting the book is "especially apt to do much damage and seduce people into believing in things for which there is extremely scant evidence."

== Publications ==
Books

- Experimental social psychology; an interpretation of research upon the socialization of the individual (1931)
- A Briefer General Psychology (1935)
- Personality: A Biosocial Approach to Origins and Structure (1947)
- Historical Introduction to Modern Psychology (1929, revised edition 1949)
- An Introduction to Psychology (1951)
- In the Minds of Men: The Study of Human Behavior and Social Tensions in India (1953)
- Human Potentialities (1958)
- Challenge of Psychical Research: A Primer of Parapsychology (1961)
- Asian Psychology (1968)
- Encounter with Reality: New Forms for an Old Quest (with Herbert E. Spohn) (1968)
- Psychological Thought from Pythagoras to Freud: An Informal Introduction (1968)
- Western Psychology: From the Greek to William James (with Lois B. Murphy) (1969)
- William James on Psychical Research (1973)
- Humanistic Psychology (1989)
- There is More Beyond: Selected Papers of Gardner Murphy (1989)

Papers

- Murphy, G (1941). "Some Present-Day Trends in Psychical Research". Journal of the American Society for Psychical Research. 35: 118–132.
- Murphy, G (1945). "Field Theory and Survival". Journal of the American Society for Psychical Research. 39: 181–209.
- Schmeidler, G. R.; Murphy, G. (1946). "The Influence of Belief and Disbelief in ESP Upon Individual Scoring Level". Journal of Experimental Psychology. 36 (3): 271–276. doi:10.1037/h0054099. PMID 20985363.
- Murphy, G (1949). "Psychical Research and Personality [Presidential address]". Proceedings of the Society for Psychical Research. 49: 1–15.
- Murphy, G (1953). "Psychology and Psychical Research". Proceedings of the Society for Psychical Research. 50: 26–49.
- Murphy, G (1958). "Trends in the Study of Extrasensory Perception". American Psychologist. 13 (2): 69–76. doi:10.1037/h0042474.
- Murphy, G (1962). "Report on Paper by Edward Girden on Psychokinesis". Psychological Bulletin. 59 (6): 520–528. doi:10.1037/h0044213. PMID 13936731.
- Murphy, G (1966). "Psychical Research Today". International Journal of Neuropsychiatry. 2 (5): 357–362. PMID 5971955.
- Murphy, G (1967). "Introductory Aspects of Modern Parapsychological Research". Transactions of the New York Academy of Sciences. 30 (2): 256–260. doi:10.1111/j.2164-0947.1967.tb02462.x. PMID 5240343.
- Murphy, G (1973). "A Caringtonian Approach to Ian Stevenson's Twenty Cases Suggestive of Reincarnation". Journal of the American Society for Psychical Research. 67: 117–129.
