= Joseph Gaither Pratt =

American psychologist (1910–1979)

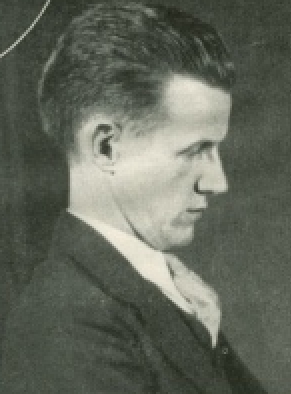
- Pratt in 1934
- Born: August 31, 1910; Winston-Salem, North Carolina, U.S.
- Died: November 3, 1979 (aged 69)
- Occupation(s): Psychologist, parapsychologist

Joseph Gaither Pratt (August 31, 1910 – November 3, 1979) was an American psychologist who specialized in the field of parapsychology. Among his research interests were extrasensory perception, psychokinesis, mediumship and poltergeists.

Much of Pratt's research was conducted while he was associated with J. B. Rhine's Parapsychology Laboratory at Duke University (1932–1964), and he also conducted research while associated with Columbia University (1935–1937), under Gardner Murphy, and the University of Virginia (1964–1975). Pratt was co-experimenter in the Pearce–Pratt and Pratt–Woodruff tests that are considered by some parapsychologists to have provided evidence for psi, though critics discovered flaws in the experiments. He was the principal author of the publication Extrasensory Perception After Sixty Years (1940). He was the principal author of an article in the journal Nature that offered a statistical summary of almost a decade of experiments with the selected participant, Pavel Štěpánek.

== Biography ==
J. G. Pratt was born on August 31, 1910, at Winston-Salem in the Piedmont section of North Carolina, the fourth among 10 children of a large farming family. From an early age, he planned to become a Methodist minister. He commenced his university studies in 1928 at Trinity College, Durham, in what was to become Duke University's School of Religion, and from which he obtained his B.A. in 1931. Pratt came to realize that "my mind was not suited to a profession in which the answers to the great questions regarding man and his relation to the universe are largely taken on faith". Accordingly, in 1932, he entered Duke's Department of Psychology, from which he graduated with a M.A. in 1933, and a Ph.D. in 1936. His doctoral thesis was concerned with the psychology of learning, as informed by his experiments on white rats.

Pratt spent two of his early academic years (1935–1937) at Columbia University, upon the invitation of Gardner Murphy to there seek to replicate the results of forced-choice ESP experiments, as offered by J. B. Rhine at Duke University. From 1937, Pratt worked as Research Associate, and then as Assistant Director, of the Parapsychology Laboratory at Duke University, under Rhine. A brief hiatus to his research occurred from 1942 to 1946, while he served in the U.S. Navy. Pratt continued as Assistant Director of the Parapsychology Laboratory until, in 1964, Rhine reorganized the Laboratory outside of Duke University, and within his own Foundation for Research on the Nature of Man. From this point onwards, Pratt maintained a professional relationship with the University of Virginia.

Pratt was President of the Parapsychological Association in 1960. In 1970, together with Jürgen Keil, of the University of Tasmania, he was awarded the Parapsychology Laboratory's McDougall award for their research with the selected participant Pavel Štěpánek. His later years were somewhat concerned by attentions to the claims of fraud against his one-time research associate, S. G. Soal.

Pratt died on November 3, 1979. His archives are stored at Duke University, and within the historical collections section of the medical library at the University of Virginia. Pratt's granddaughter is American magazine editor, Jane Pratt.

== Experiments ==
=== The Pearce–Pratt experiment ===
Pratt and the divinity student Hubert Pearce performed a long distance ESP experiment at the Duke University in 37 sittings between August 1933 and March 1934. For the experiment Pratt positioned himself in a room in the physics building whilst Pearce went to the library. Pratt took a pack of ESP cards and after shuffling them placed it facedown on the table. When the experiment started he took the top card and placed it face down on a book. After a minute the card would be transferred to the table and a second card from the pack would be placed on the book. After a run of twenty-five cards and a short break the same procedure was followed by a second pack.

In the library Pearce would guess to identify each card on the book. Both Pearce and Pratt made a copy of their records which were sent to Joseph Rhine's office. In 37 sittings they both produced 558 hits out of 1,850 trials. Rhine was present at only three of the sittings in Pratt's room as an observer.

In 1960, C. E. M. Hansel investigated the Duke Campus and found that it would have been easy for Pearce to have left the library during the experiment to approach Pratt's room and watch him turn over the cards. According to John Sladek "The room had a clear window giving on to the corridor, a trap door with a hole in it situated right above Pratt's table and Hansel found that he could stand up on the chair in the corridor and peer through a crack at the top of the door to see the cards."

Rhine and Pratt responded to the criticisms claiming that during three of the sittings Rhine was present in the room and could see the subject from the window enter the library. Hansel responded by questioning how Rhine could have been watching everything at once. If he had been looking out the window for Pearce then Pratt could have faked his records and if he was watching Pratt then Pearce may have sneaked out of the library and into Pratt's room.

Paul Kurtz wrote that "Pratt could easily have peeked at the Zener cards by sneaking out of the library to the sender's office, or by using an accomplice." Hansel came to the conclusion that the possibility of trickery had not been ruled out in the experiment, the subject was left unobserved in the library, the room used by Pratt was not screened to make it impossible for outsiders to see inside and the reports themselves contained conflicting statements so because of these factors the experiment could not be regarded as supplying evidence of ESP.

In 1967, the parapsychologist Ian Stevenson criticized one of Hansel's suggestions. Stevenson claimed the position of the rooms in Hansel's plan were inaccurate. Hansel responded to this by claiming the building plan was not to scale and would not alter his argument, as the simplest way for Pearce to have cheated on the experiment would have been to observe the cards from the corridor, and this possibility was not ruled out. Hansel also noted the physics building at the time of the experiment was little used.

Physicist Victor J. Stenger has written:

Hansel tried to get the architect's plans from Duke, but had been rebuffed. If Hansel's scale was so far incorrect as to negate his argument, why not produce plans to demonstrate it? Rhine's lab never demonstrated that Pearce could not have cheated in the ways proposed by Hansel. Hansel did not have to prove anything. The burden of proving that cheating was impossible rested with Rhine and Pratt, not Hansel. Hansel succeeded brilliantly in exposing the shoddiness of the experimental procedures of Rhine's laboratory. Any number of simple precautions could have been taken to guard against fraud. In any sensible experimental protocol, Pearce would have been watched. Pratt's room should have been carefully sealed. Many other precautions with the handling of the data were not taken, giving Pearce or Pratt a number of opportunities to change the figures.

Martin Gardner claimed to have inside information that files in Rhine's laboratory contain material suggesting fraud on the part of Pearce. Gardner also commented "Hansel has shown in his book that Pratt’s experiments with Pearce were almost as amateurishly designed as Rhine’s early test of Lady Wonder, the mind-reading horse, but Pratt lacks the courage to admit it."

=== The Pratt–Woodruff experiment ===
The experiment took place at the Parapsychology Laboratory at Duke University between October 1, 1938, and February 28, 1939. The experiment consisted of Joseph Woodruff the experimenter, Pratt as the observer and a subject. The experiment involved the subject (S) and the experimenter (E) sitting at the sides of a table which was divided by a screen. On the side of the subject five 'key-cards' were placed on pegs. Each of the cards depicted an ESP symbol which the experimenter did not know. Below the ESP cards five blank cards were placed on the table marking their positions. A slot was placed at the bottom of the screen so both the subject and the experimenter could see the blanks. A smaller screen was also used to prevent the subject from seeing what the experimenter was doing.

The experimenter cut an ESP pack of cards, keeping them face down. The subject would then guess the top card by pointing at a blank. If the guess was a cross then the subject would point at the blank below the key card resembling a cross. The experimenter would then take the ESP card and place it opposite the blank indicated. When the pack had been completed the experimenter had five cards before him. The experimenter would then turn over each pile and record how many cards of each symbol it contained. An observer (O) was placed behind the subject. The observer then recorded the positions of the key cards on their pegs. The experimenter could not see this record. The experimenter and the observer would then store their records and lock them away. The three persons present would then would check the positions of the key cards and the number of hits on each pile. In total 32 subjects tested the experiment with the total score for 60, 000 trials being 12, 489 hits.

Critics pointed out that there were serious weaknesses in the experiment so that if the experimenter could learn the position of even one of the key cards he could increase the number of hits. In 1960, C. E. M. Hansel visited the Parapsychology Laboratory and investigated the apparatus and discovered the experiment did not rule out the possibility of trickery. John Sladek wrote regarding Hansel's discovery:

He found that, though the key cards are hung on their pegs in a different order for each run (each twenty-five trials), it is certainly possible for E to guess the new positions of one or two of them. When the screen is laid on its side after a run, E notes that the key card in Position 1 (the right- or left-hand end) is, say, a cross. The screen is then set up for the next run. S or O then removes the key cards from their pegs and replaces them in a different order. But E can see from his movements in what order he removes them (left to right or right to left). Then, unless the key cards are shuffled before replacing them, E can guess that the first or last card replaced will be a cross. E then completes the run as usual, and begins his tally. At this point, neither S or O can see what he's doing. It's easy enough for him to slip a card or two (bearing a cross) into the 'cross' pile without being detected.

Hansel in his book ESP and Parapsychology: A Critical Re-Evaluation (pp. 125–140) discussed the experiment and its flaws in detail. Hansel wrote the counter-criticisms from Pratt and Woodruff did not hold up to scrutiny as the results from the experiment could have originated through the use of a trick then it cannot be claimed to provide evidence for ESP. Hansel suggested for the experiment to be repeated with additional precautions to prevent the possibility of a trick being used but the experiment was never repeated at the laboratory.

== Selected works ==
=== Books ===
- Stuart, C. E., & Pratt, J. G. (1937). A Handbook for Testing Extra-sensory Perception. New York, NY, US: Farrar and Rinehart.
- Pratt, J. G., Rhine, J. B., Smith, B. M., Stuart, C. E., & Greenwood, J. A. (1940). Extra-Sensory Perception after Sixty Years. New York, NY, US: Henry Holt.
- Rhine, J. B., & Pratt, J. G. (1957). Parapsychology: Frontier Science of the Mind. Springfield, IL, US Charles C. Thomas.
- Pratt, J. G. (1964). Parapsychology: An Insider's View of ESP. London, UK: W.H. Allen.
- Pratt, J. G. (1973). ESP Research Today: A Study of Developments in Parapsychology since 1960. Metuchen, NJ, US: Scarecrow Press.

=== Journal articles ===
- Pratt, J. G. (1936). Towards a method of evaluating mediumistic material. Bulletin of the Boston Society for Psychic Research, 23.
- Pratt, J. G., & Woodruff, J. L. (1939). Size of stimulus symbols in extrasensory perception. Journal of Parapsychology, 3, 121–158.
- Pratt, J. G. (1947). Trial-by-trial grouping of success and failure in psi tests. Journal of Parapsychology, 11, 254–268.
- Pratt, J. G. (1948). Parapsychology and general psychology. Journal of the American Society for Psychical Research, 42, 142–145.
- Pratt, J. G., & Birge, W. R. (1948). Appraising verbal test material in parapsychology. Journal of Parapsychology, 12, 236–256.
- Pratt, J. G. (1949). The meaning of performance curves in ESP and PK test data. Journal of Parapsychology, 13, 9–23.
- Pratt, J. G., & Foster, E. B. (1950). Displacement in ESP card tests in relation to hits and misses. Journal of Parapsychology, 14, 37–52.
- Pratt, J. G. (1951). The reinforcement effect in ESP displacement. Journal of Parapsychology, 15, 103–117.
- Pratt, J. G. (1953). The homing problem in pigeons. Journal of Parapsychology, 17, 34–60.
- Pratt, J. G. (1954). The variance for multiple-calling ESP data. Journal of Parapsychology, 18, 37–40.
- Pratt, J. G., & Roll, W. G. (1958). The Seaford disturbances. Journal of Parapsychology, 22, 79–124.
- Pratt, J. G. (1960). Methods of evaluating verbal material. Journal of Parapsychology, 24, 94–109.
- Pratt, J. G. (1967). Further significant ESP results from Pavel Stepanek and findings bearing upon the focusing effect. Journal of the American Society for Psychical Research, 61, 95–119.
- Pratt, J. G. (1967). A computer programme for ESP group tests. Journal of the Society for Psychical Research, 44, 71–82.
- Pratt, J. G., Stevenson, I., Roll, W. G., Meinsma, G. L., Keil, H. H. J., & Jacobson, N. (1968). Identification of concealed randomized objects through acquired response habits of stimulus and word association. Nature, 220, 89–91.
- Pratt, J. G., Keil, H. H. J., & Stevenson, I. (1970). Three-experimenter ESP tests of Pavel Stepanek during his 1968 visit to Charlottesville. Journal of the American Society for Psychical Research, 64, 18–39.
- Roll, W. G., & Pratt, J. G. (1971). The Miami disturbances. Journal of the American Society for Psychical Research, 65, 409–454.
- Pratt, J. G. (1973). A decade of research with a selected subject: An overview and reappraisal of the work with Pavel Stepanek. Proceedings of the American Society for Psychical Research, 30, 1–78.
- Pratt, J. G., & Keil, H. H. J. (1973). Firsthand observations of Nina S. Kulagina suggestive of PK upon static objects. Journal of the American Society for Psychical Research, 67, 381–390.
- Pratt, J. G. (1975). Some notes for the future Einstein for parapsychology. In J. C. Poynton (Ed.), Parapsychology in South Africa: Proceedings of a 1973 Conference (pp. 144–163). Johannesburg, SA: South African Society for Psychical Research.
- Pratt, J. G. (1978). Prologue to a debate: Some assumptions relevant to research in parapsychology. Journal of the American Society for Psychical Research, 72, 127–139.

== Further information ==
Keil, H. H. J. (1987). Gaither Pratt: A Life for Parapsychology. Jefferson, NC, US: McFarland. [Authored by Pratt's closest research associate from the 1960s–1970s, this publication includes a biographical essay on J. G. Pratt, seven articles authored by J. G. Pratt, comments from his peers, and an extensive bibliography of Pratt's published writings.]
