= Clairvoyance =

Claimed form of extrasensory perception

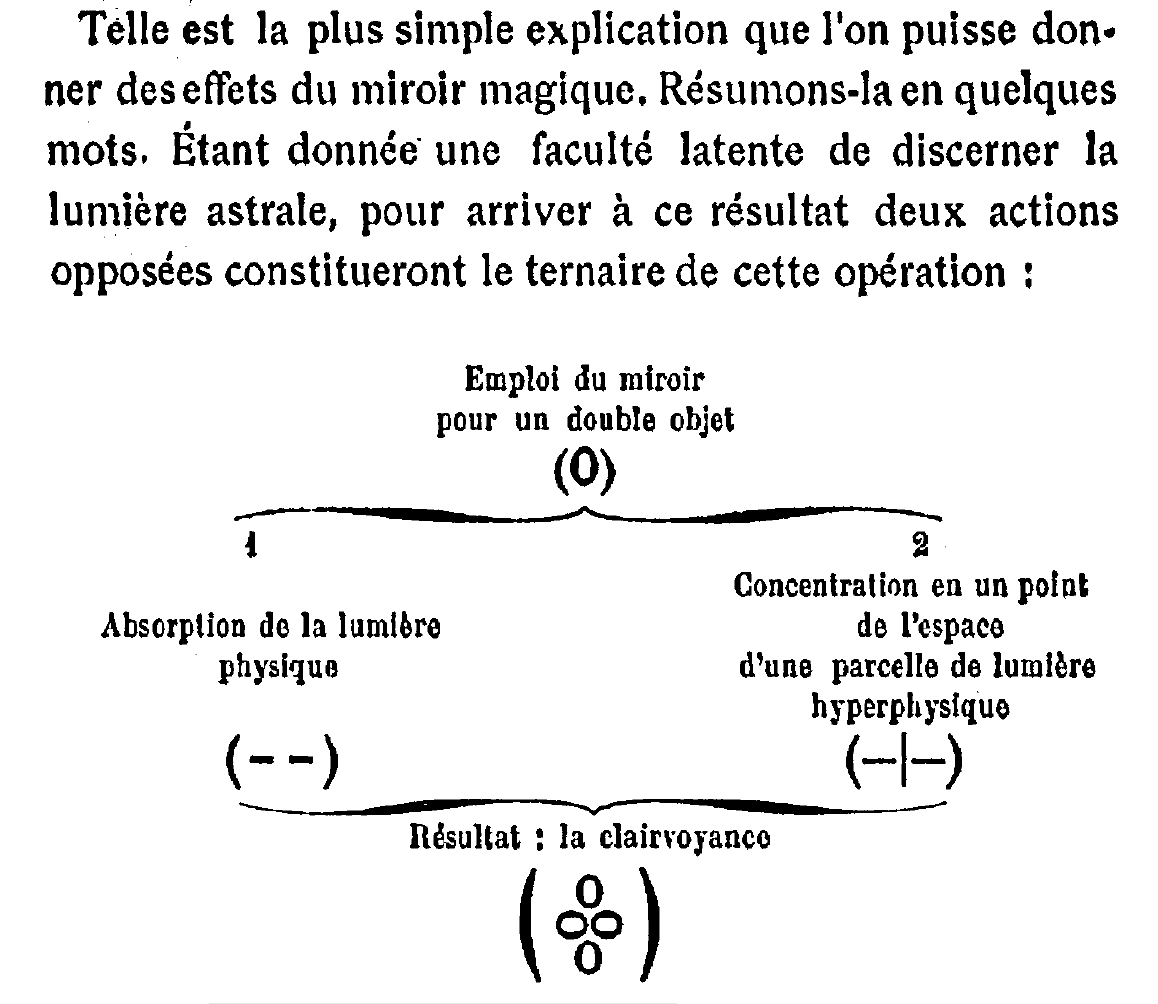
Diagram by the French esotericist Paul Sédir to explain clairvoyance

Clairvoyance (/klɛərˈvɔɪ.əns/; from French clair 'clear' and voyance 'vision') is the claimed ability to acquire information that would be considered impossible to get through scientifically proven sensations, thus classified as extrasensory perception, or "sixth sense". Any person who is claimed to have such ability is said to be a clairvoyant (/klɛərˈvɔɪ.ənt/) ('one who sees clearly').

Claims for the existence of paranormal and psychic abilities such as clairvoyance have not been supported by scientific evidence. Parapsychology explores this possibility, but the existence of the paranormal is not accepted by the scientific community. The scientific community widely considers parapsychology, including the study of clairvoyance, a pseudoscience.

== Usage ==
Pertaining to the ability of clear-sightedness, clairvoyance refers to the paranormal ability to see persons and events that are distant in time or space. It can be divided into roughly three classes: precognition, the ability to perceive or predict future events, retrocognition, the ability to see past events, and remote viewing, the perception of contemporary events happening outside the range of normal perception.

The English connotations of seeing through time are not always present in concepts of clairvoyance in other languages. The French usage, for example, has more emphasis on spatial connotations and arises from the Latin etymology of clear-seeing/clear vision.

== In history and religion ==
Throughout history, there have been numerous places and times in which people have claimed themselves, or others, to be clairvoyant. In several religions, stories of certain individuals being able to see things far removed from their immediate sensory perception are commonplace, especially within pagan religions where oracles were used. Prophecy often involved some degree of clairvoyance, especially when future events were predicted. This ability is sometimes attributed to a higher power rather than the person performing it.

=== Christianity ===
A number of Christian saints were said to be able to see or know things that were far removed from their immediate sensory perception as a kind of gift from God, including Charbel Makhlouf, Padre Pio, Magdalena Gornik and Anne Catherine Emmerich in Catholicism and Gabriel Urgebadze, Paisios Eznepidis and John Maximovitch in Eastern Orthodoxy. Jesus in the Gospels is also recorded as being able to know things far removed from his immediate human perception. Some Christians today also share the same claim.

=== Jainism ===
In Jainism, clairvoyance is regarded as one of the five kinds of knowledge. The beings of hell and heaven (devas) are said to possess clairvoyance by birth. According to Jain text Sarvārthasiddhi, "this kind of knowledge has been called avadhi as it ascertains matter in downward range or knows objects within limits".

=== In China ===
The Chinese term for clairvoyance and clairvoyant is qianliyan (literally, "thousand-mile eyes"). The origin of this usage is Qianliyan, a Daoist guardian deity often depicted as a statute guarding Mazu temples in East Asia. Qianliyan's sight ability carried over to Buddhist representations, symbolizing divine faculties of seeing.

=== Anthroposophy ===
Rudolf Steiner, famous as a clairvoyant himself, claimed that it is easy for a clairvoyant to confuse their own emotional and spiritual being with the objective spiritual world.

== Parapsychology ==
=== Early research ===
The earliest record of somnambulist clairvoyance is credited to the Marquis de Puységur, a follower of Franz Mesmer, who in 1784 was treating a local dull-witted peasant named Victor Race. During treatment, Race reportedly went into a trance and underwent a personality change, becoming fluent and articulate, and giving diagnosis and prescription for his own disease as well as those of others. Clairvoyance was a reported ability of some mediums during the spiritualist period of the late 19th and early 20th centuries, and psychics of many descriptions have claimed clairvoyant ability up to the present day.

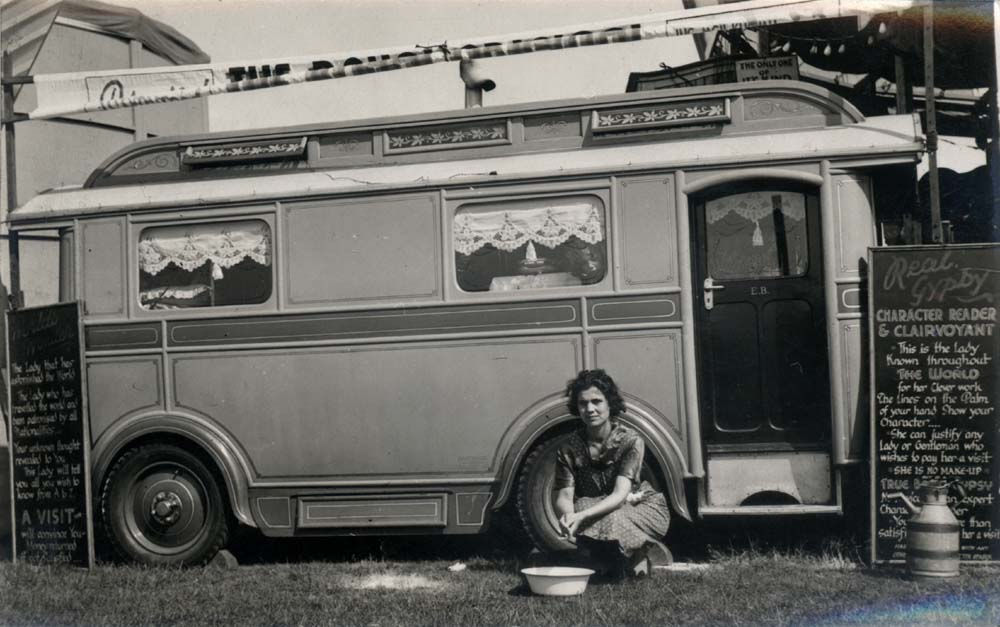
Character reader and clairvoyant in a British travelling show of the 1940s, collected by Arthur James Fenwick (1878–1957)

Early researchers of clairvoyance included William Gregory, Gustav Pagenstecher, and Rudolf Tischner. Clairvoyance experiments were reported in 1884 by Charles Richet. Playing cards were enclosed in envelopes and a subject under hypnosis attempted to identify them. The subject was reported to have been successful in a series of 133 trials but the results dropped to chance level when performed before a group of scientists in Cambridge. J. M. Peirce and E. C. Pickering reported a similar experiment in which they tested 36 subjects over 23,384 trials. They did not find above chance scores.

Ivor Lloyd Tuckett (1911) and Joseph McCabe (1920) analyzed early cases of clairvoyance and concluded they were best explained by coincidence or fraud. In 1919, the magician P. T. Selbit staged a séance at his flat in Bloomsbury. The spiritualist Arthur Conan Doyle attended and declared the clairvoyance manifestations genuine.

A significant development in clairvoyance research came when J. B. Rhine, a parapsychologist at Duke University, introduced a standard methodology, with a standard statistical approach to analyzing data, as part of his research into extrasensory perception. A number of psychological departments attempted and failed to repeat Rhine's experiments. At Princeton University, W. S. Cox (1936) produced 25,064 trials with 132 subjects in a playing card ESP experiment. Cox concluded: "There is no evidence of extrasensory perception either in the 'average man' or of the group investigated or in any particular individual of that group. The discrepancy between these results and those obtained by Rhine is due either to uncontrollable factors in experimental procedure or to the difference in the subjects." Four other psychological departments failed to replicate Rhine's results. It was revealed that Rhine's experiments contained methodological flaws and procedural errors.

Eileen Garrett was tested by Rhine at Duke University in 1933 with Zener cards. Certain symbols were placed on the cards and sealed in an envelope, and she was asked to guess their contents. She performed poorly and later criticized the tests by claiming the cards lacked a psychic energy called "energy stimulus" and that she could not perform clairvoyance on command. The parapsychologist Samuel Soal and his colleagues tested Garrett in May 1937. Most of the experiments were carried out in the Psychological Laboratory at the University College London. A total of over 12,000 guesses were recorded but Garrett failed to produce above chance level. Soal wrote: "In the case of Mrs. Eileen Garrett we fail to find the slightest confirmation of Dr. J. B. Rhine's remarkable claims relating to her alleged powers of extra-sensory perception. Not only did she fail when I took charge of the experiments, but she failed equally when four other carefully trained experimenters took my place."

=== Remote viewing ===
Remote viewing, also known as remote sensing, remote perception, telesthesia and travelling clairvoyance, is the alleged paranormal ability to perceive a remote or hidden target without support of the senses.

A well-known recent study of remote viewing is the US government-funded project at the Stanford Research Institute from the 1970s through the mid-1990s. In 1972, Harold E. Puthoff and Russell Targ initiated a series of human subject studies to determine whether participants (the viewers or percipients) could reliably identify and accurately describe salient features of remote locations (targets). In the early studies, a human sender was typically present at the remote location as part of the experiment protocol. A three-step process was used. First, target conditions to be experienced by the senders were randomly selected. Second, in the viewing step, participants were asked to verbally express or sketch their impressions of the remote scene. Third, these descriptions were matched by separate judges, as closely as possible, with the intended targets. The term remote viewing was coined to describe this overall process. The first paper by Puthoff and Targ on remote viewing was published in Nature in March 1974; in it, the team reported some degree of remote viewing success. After the publication of these findings, other attempts to replicate the experiments were carried out with remotely linked groups using computer conferencing.

The psychologists David Marks and Richard Kammann attempted to replicate Targ and Puthoff's remote viewing experiments at the Stanford Research Institute. In a series of 35 studies, they could not do so, so they investigated the original experiments' procedure. Marks and Kammann discovered that the notes given to the judges in Targ and Puthoff's experiments contained clues as to which order they were carried out, such as referring to yesterday's two targets, or the date of the session at the top of the page. They concluded that these clues explained the experiment's high hit rates. Marks achieved 100% accuracy without visiting any of the sites but by using cues. James Randi has written that controlled tests by several other researchers, eliminating several sources of cuing and extraneous evidence present in the original tests, produced negative results. Students were also able to solve Puthoff and Targ's locations from the clues inadvertently included in the transcripts.

In 1980, Charles Tart claimed that a rejudging of the transcripts from one of Targ and Puthoff's experiments revealed an above-chance result. Targ and Puthoff again refused to provide copies of the transcripts, and they were not made available for study until July 1985, when it was discovered they still contained sensory cues. Marks and Christopher Scott (1986) wrote: "considering the importance for the remote viewing hypothesis of adequate cue removal, Tart's failure to perform this basic task seems beyond comprehension. As previously concluded, remote viewing has not been demonstrated in the experiments conducted by Puthoff and Targ, only the repeated failure of the investigators to remove sensory cues."

In 1982, Robert G. Jahn, then Dean of the School of Engineering at Princeton University, wrote a comprehensive review of psychic phenomena from an engineering perspective. His paper included numerous references to remote viewing studies at the time. Statistical flaws in his work have been proposed by others in the parapsychological community and the general scientific community.

== Scientific reception ==
According to scientific research, clairvoyance is generally explained as the result of confirmation bias, expectancy bias, fraud, hallucination, self-delusion, sensory leakage, subjective validation, wishful thinking or failures to appreciate the base rate of chance occurrences and not as a paranormal power. Parapsychology is generally regarded by the scientific community as a pseudoscience. In 1988, the US National Research Council concluded "The committee finds no scientific justification from research conducted over a period of 130 years, for the existence of parapsychological phenomena."

Skeptics say that if clairvoyance were a reality, it would have become abundantly clear. They also contend that those who believe in paranormal phenomena do so for merely psychological reasons. According to David G. Myers (Psychology, 8th ed.):

The search for a valid and reliable test of clairvoyance has resulted in thousands of experiments. One controlled procedure has invited 'senders' to telepathically transmit one of four visual images to 'receivers' deprived of sensation in a nearby chamber (Bem & Honorton, 1994). The result? A reported 32 percent accurate response rate, surpassing the chance rate of 25 percent. But follow-up studies have (depending on who was summarizing the results) failed to replicate the phenomenon or produced mixed results (Bem & others, 2001; Milton & Wiseman, 2002; Storm, 2000, 2003).

One skeptic, magician James Randi, had a longstanding offer of U.S. $1 million—"to anyone who proves a genuine psychic power under proper observing conditions" (Randi, 1999). French, Australian, and Indian groups have parallel offers of up to 200,000 euros to anyone with demonstrable paranormal abilities (CFI, 2003). Large as these sums are, the scientific seal of approval would be worth far more to anyone whose claims could be authenticated. To refute those who say there is no ESP, one need only produce a single person who can demonstrate a single, reproducible ESP phenomenon. So far, no such person has emerged. Randi's offer has been publicized for three decades and dozens of people have been tested, sometimes under the scrutiny of an independent panel of judges. Still, nothing. "People's desire to believe in the paranormal is stronger than all the evidence that it does not exist." Susan Blackmore, "Blackmore's first law", 2004.

Clairvoyance is considered a hallucination by mainstream psychiatry.

== In popular culture ==
- In the 1979 novel The Dead Zone by Stephen King, the protagonist Johnny Smith gains the ability of clairvoyance working through simple touch after awakening from a coma that has lasted nearly five years.
- Chinese pop culture depictions of clairvoyance include Second Brother, one of the protagonists in Calabash Brothers, a popular animated series by Shanghai Animation Film Studio in the 1980s.
- The Chinese term for clairvoyance, qianliyan, appears in various machine vision and remote video products, such as China Mobile's Qianliyan product line and QLYBOT's robot products.

== See also ==
- Astral projection
- Astral religion
- Aura
- Body of light
- Clairvoyance (book)
- Inner eye
- List of topics characterized as pseudoscience
- Mediumship
- Out-of-body experience
- Photoacoustic effect
- Postcognition
- Postdiction (retroactive clairvoyance)
- Precognition
- Remote viewing
- Scientific skepticism
- Second sight
- Synchronicity
- Third eye
- Thought-Forms (book)

== Bibliography ==
- Jain, S. A. (1992). Reality. Jwalamalini Trust. "Not in Copyright." Alt URL
