= C. E. M. Hansel =

British psychologist and parapsychology critic (1917–2011)

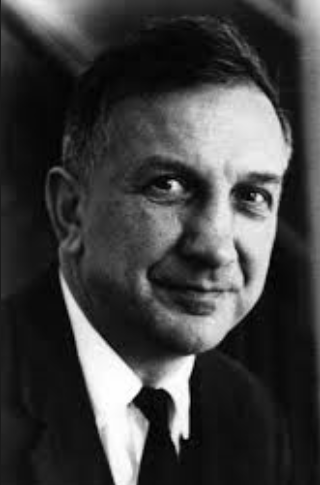
- Born: 12 October 1917; Bedford, England
- Died: 28 March 2011 (aged 93)
- Education: Fitzwilliam College, Cambridge
- Occupations: Psychologist, writer
- Spouse: Gwenllian Evans (m. 1954)
- Children: 5

Charles Edward Mark Hansel (12 October 1917 – 28 March 2011) was a British psychologist most notable for his criticism of parapsychological studies.

== Early life and education ==
Hansel was born in 1917 in Bedford, England, and attended Bedford School as a child. He received a commission in the RAF Equipment branch as an acting pilot officer in April 1939, serving in England, Iraq, and Egypt. After his service, he attended Bournemouth Municipal College of Technology and Commerce, earning a BA, and Fitzwilliam College, Cambridge, where he studied Moral Sciences, Part II Psychology and earned his affiliated BA and MA.

== Parapsychology career ==
Following his graduation in 1949, Hansel joined the faculty at the University of Manchester as a lecturer in Psychology. He later moved to Swansea University where he became a Professor of Experimental Psychology and Head of the Department of Psychology. Hansel was a fellow of the Committee for Skeptical Inquiry.

Hansel's most well-known work is his book ESP: A Scientific Evaluation (1966), revised (1980, 1989). In it, he examined the areas of telepathy, clairvoyance, precognition, and psychokinesis and analysed many major ESP experiments that claimed to have conclusively demonstrated the phenomenon. Hansel found that all of the research he examined suffered from poor experimental design, which allowed for error, misinterpretation, and fraud. He suspected that the data from the Soal-Goldney experiments, run by Samuel Soal, was fraudulent but parapsychologists refused to accept Hansel's charge. However, Hansel was later proven to be correct. Hansel noted that there was a history of "trickery" in psychical research and reached the conclusion that although trickery was not necessarily the cause of the results, as long as it could not be ruled out ESP could not be claimed to have been conclusively demonstrated. In his revised edition, Hansel (1980) points out that "after 100 years of research, not a single individual has been found who can demonstrate ESP to the satisfaction of independent investigators. For this reason alone it is unlikely that ESP exists".

== Family ==
Hansel married in 1954 and had five children.

== Reception ==
Hansel's book received positive reviews from scientists and sceptics. The physicist Victor J. Stenger noted that "Hansel succeeded brilliantly in exposing the shoddiness of the experimental procedures of Rhine's laboratory." Robert Sheaffer stated that Hansel's criticisms were devastating to the claims of ESP and the book was a severe challenge to parapsychology. Philosopher Antony Flew also gave a positive review, highlighting the failure of parapsychology to provide repeatable experiments.

The work also received criticism, with parapsychologist John Beloff claiming the book was little more than an attempt to explain away the evidence. Parapsychologist Gardner Murphy gave it a mixed-review but recommended the book "as valuable for the parapsychologist in pointing out ways in which he must tighten his research." Hansel's revised edition in 1989 contained further studies and an appendix with replies to his critics.

The psychologist David Marks in his book The Psychology of the Psychic (2000) noted that his discovery of an experimental error in parapsychological experiments confirmed the research of Hansel.

== Publications ==
- Experiments on Telepathy. The New Scientist. 1959. pp. 457–459.
- Hansel, C. E. M. (1959). "Experimental Evidence for Extra-Sensory-Perception". Nature. 184 (4697): 1515–1516. Bibcode:1959Natur.184.1515H. doi:10.1038/1841515a0. PMID 14399569. S2CID 4157409.
- "A Critical Review of the Experiments on Mr. Basil Shackleton and Mrs. Gloria Stewart as Sensitives". Proceedings of the Society for Psychical Research. 53 (190). 1960.
- "Experiments on Telepathy in Children: A Reply to Sir Cyril Burt". British Journal of Statistical Psychology. 13 (2). 1960. doi:10.1111/j.2044-8317.1960.tb00055.x.
- "A Critical Analysis of the Pearce-Pratt Experiment". The Journal of Parapsychology. 25 (2): 87. 1961.
- "A Critical Analysis of the Pratt-Woodruff Experiment". The Journal of Parapsychology. 25 (2): 99. 1961.
- ESP: A Scientific Evaluation. Scribner. 1966. ISBN 978-0684310503.
- "Psychical History". Nature (August 1968).
- Hansel, C. E. M. (1969). "ESP: Deficiencies of Experimental Method". Nature. 221 (5186): 1171–1172. Bibcode:1969Natur.221.1171H. doi:10.1038/2211171a0. PMID 4975289. S2CID 4187882.
- ESP and Parapsychology: A Critical Re-evaluation. Prometheus Books. 1980. ISBN 978-0879751203.
- "A Critical Analysis Of H. Schmidt's PK Experiments". Skeptical Inquirer. 5 (3): 26–33. 1981.
- Hansel, C.E.M. (1986). "Fact or fiction?". Nature. 322 (6079): 505–506. Bibcode:1986Natur.322..505H. doi:10.1038/322505b0. S2CID 39810143.
- The Search for Psychic Power: Esp & Parapsychology Revisited: ESP and Parapsychology Revisited. Prometheus Books. 1989. ISBN 978-0879755164.
