= Zener cards =

Cards used to test a subject's level of extra sensory perception

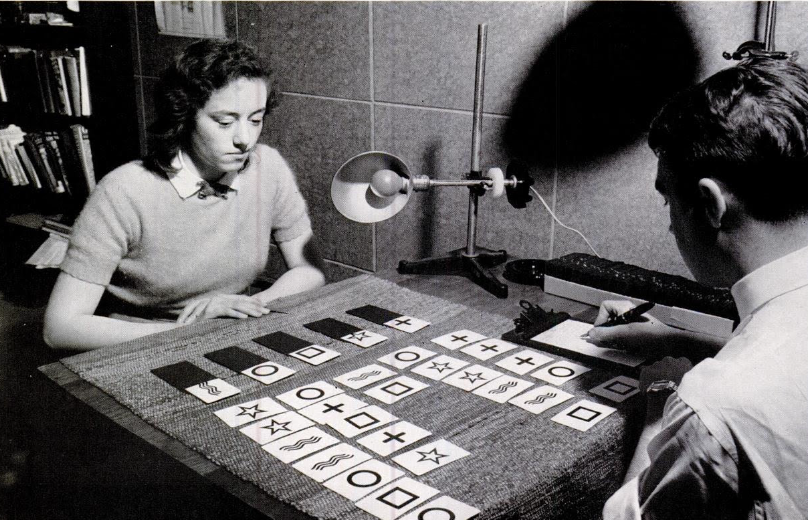
An ESP card experiment being conducted with Zener cards in 1940

Zener card designs

Zener cards are cards used to conduct experiments for extrasensory perception (ESP). Perceptual psychologist Karl Zener (1903–1964) designed the cards in the early 1930s for experiments conducted with his colleague, parapsychologist J. B. Rhine (1895–1980).

== Overview ==
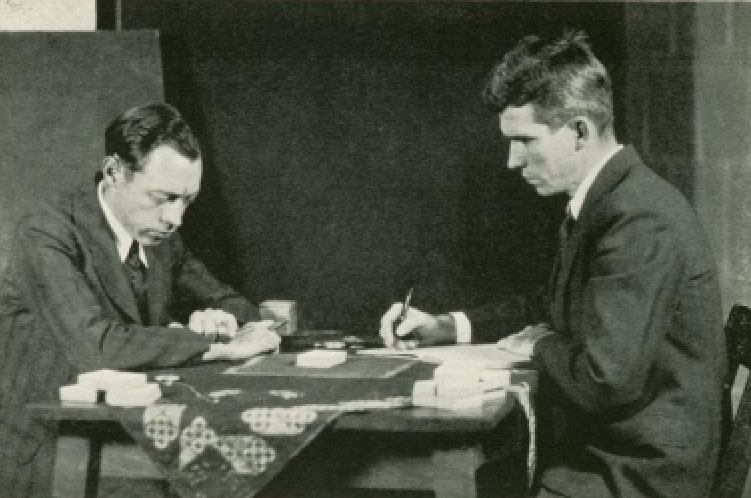
Hubert Pearce with Joseph Banks Rhine.

The Zener cards are a deck of 25 cards, five of each symbol. The five symbols are a hollow circle, a plus sign, three vertical wavy lines, a hollow square, and a hollow five-pointed star.

In a test for ESP, the experimenter picks up a card in a shuffled pack, observes the symbol, and records the answer of the person being tested, who would guess which of the five designs is on the card. The experimenter continues until all the cards in the pack are used.

Poor shuffling methods can make the order of cards in the deck easier to predict and the cards could have been inadvertently or intentionally marked and manipulated. In his experiments, J. B. Rhine first shuffled the cards by hand but later decided to use a machine for shuffling.

In his book, The New Apocrypha, John Sladek expressed incredulity at the tests, stating, "It's astonishing that playing cards should have been chosen for ESP research at all. They are, after all, the instruments of stage magicians and second-dealing gamblers; they can be marked and manipulated in many traditional ways. At the best of times, card-shuffling is a poor way of getting a random distribution of symbols."

Rhine's experiments with Zener cards were discredited due to either sensory leakage, cheating, or both. The latter included the subject being able to read the symbols from slight indentations on the backs of cards, and being able to both see and hear the experimenter, which allowed the subject to note facial expressions and breathing patterns.

Terence Hines has written of the original experiments:

The methods the Rhines used to prevent subjects from gaining hints and clues as to the design on the cards were far from adequate. In many experiments, the cards were displayed face up, but hidden behind a small wooden shield. Several ways of obtaining information about the design on the card remain even in the presence of the shield. For instance, the subject may be able sometimes to see the design on the face-up card reflected in the agent’s glasses. Even if the agent isn’t wearing glasses, it is possible to see the reflection in his cornea.

Once Rhine took precautions in response to criticisms of his methods, he was unable to find any high-scoring subjects.

James Alcock notes, "Despite Rhine’s confidence that he had established the reality of extrasensory perception, he had not done so. Methodological problems with his experiments eventually came to light, and as a result, parapsychologists no longer run card-guessing studies and rarely even refer to Rhine’s work."

The chemist Irving Langmuir called Rhine's experiments an example of pathological science–"the science of things that aren't so," as he described it–and criticized its practitioners not as dishonest people but as ones that have sufficiently fooled themselves.

During James Randi's TV special, Exploring Psychic Powers Live!, a psychic was tested on a deck of 250 Zener cards and was only able to predict 50 of them correctly, which is the expected result of random guessing the cards.

In 2016, Massimo Polidoro tested an Italian mother and daughter who were claiming a 90% and above success rate of psychic transmission using Zener cards. Upon restricting them from seeing each other's faces and the use of a silent writing method, their success rate dropped to no better than chance. The women were cognizant of the fact that they required visual contact to achieve transmission of the symbols, saying, "This kind of understanding is so natural to us, all this attention to us is also very surprising. There are no tricks, but surely we understand each other with looks. It always happens."

== Statistics ==
Standard deviation diagram

The results of many tests using Zener cards fit with a typical normal distribution.

Probability predicts these test results for a test of 25 questions with five possible answers if chance is operating:

- 79.3% of people will get between 3 and 7 correct.
- 10.9% will get 8 or more correct.
- One person in 73,700 will get 15 or more correct.
- One person in 5.16 billion will get 20 or more correct.
- One person in 298 quadrillion will get all 25 correct.

== See also ==
- Ganzfeld experiment
- Tattva vision
