= Joseph Banks Rhine =

American botanist and founder of parapsychology

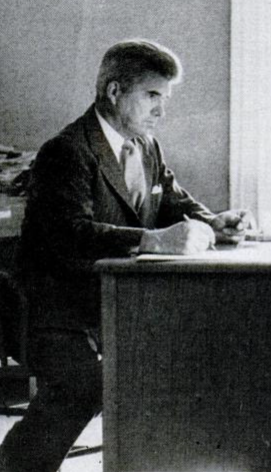
- Born: September 29, 1895
- Died: February 20, 1980 (aged 84)
- Occupations: Botanist, parapsychologist

Joseph Banks Rhine (September 29, 1895 – February 20, 1980), usually known as J. B. Rhine, was an American botanist who founded parapsychology as a branch of psychology, founding the parapsychology lab at Duke University, the Journal of Parapsychology, the Foundation for Research on the Nature of Man, and the Parapsychological Association. Rhine wrote the books Extrasensory Perception and Parapsychology: Frontier Science of the Mind.

== Early life and education ==
Rhine was the second of five children born to Samuel Ellis Rhine and Elizabeth Vaughan Rhine in Waterloo, Juniata County, Pennsylvania. Samuel Rhine had been educated in a Harrisburg business college, had taught school and later had been a farmer and merchant. The family moved to Marshallville, Ohio, when Joseph was in his early teens.

Rhine was educated at Ohio Northern University and the College of Wooster, after which he enlisted in the Marine Corps and was stationed in Santiago. Afterwards, he enrolled at the University of Chicago, where he received his master's degree in botany in 1923 and a PhD in botany in 1925. While there, he and his wife Louisa E. Rhine were impressed by a May 1922 lecture given by Arthur Conan Doyle exulting the scientific proof of communication with the dead. Rhine later wrote, "This mere possibility was the most exhilarating thought I had had in years." Rhine's interest in this topic was furthered after reading The Survival of Man, Oliver Lodge's book about mediumship and life after death.

Rhine taught for a year at Boyce Thompson Institute for Plant Research, in Yonkers, New York,. Afterwards, he enrolled in the psychology department at Harvard University to study for a year with Professor William McDougall. In 1927, he moved to Duke University in Durham, North Carolina to work under Professor McDougall. Rhine began the studies that helped develop parapsychology into a branch of science; he looked at parapsychology as a branch of "abnormal psychology."

== Observing fraudulent medium ==
Rhine lent an insight into the medium Mina Crandon's performances. He was able to observe some of her trickery in the dark when she used luminous objects. Rhine observed Crandon in fraud in a séance in 1926. According to Rhine, during the séance she was free from control and kicked a megaphone to give the impression it was levitating.

Rhine’s report that documented the fraud was refused by the American Society for Psychical Research, so he published it in the Journal of Abnormal Social Psychology. In response, defenders of Crandon attacked Rhine. Arthur Conan Doyle wrote a letter to the Boston Herald attacking Rhine's "colossal impertinence...stupidity and malignancy."

Rhine wondered why J. Malcolm Bird, with three years of experience, did not expose any of her tricks. Rhine suspected that Bird was a confederate of the medium.

== ESP research ==
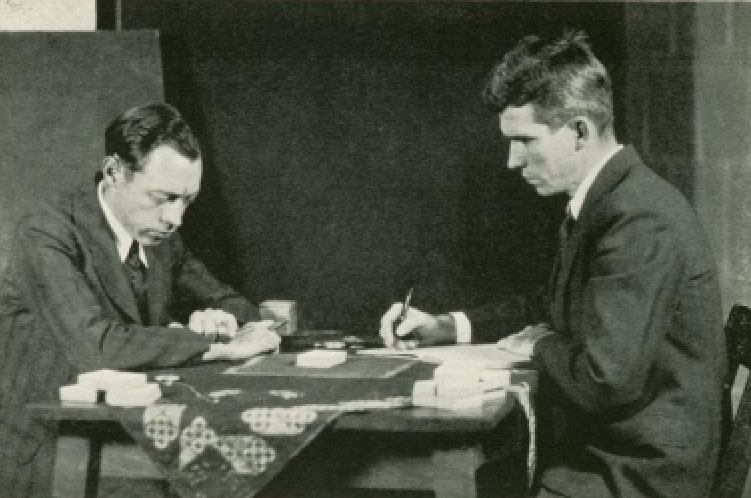
Hubert Pearce with Joseph Banks Rhine.

Rhine tested many students as volunteer subjects in his research project. His first exceptional subject in this Extrasensory Perception (ESP) research was Adam Linzmayer, an economics undergraduate at Duke. In 1931, Linzmayer scored very highly in preliminary Zener card tests that Rhine ran him through; initially, he scored 100% correct on two short (nine-card series) tests that Rhine gave him. Even in his first long test (a 300-card series), Linzmayer scored 39.6% correct scores, when chance would have been only 20%. He consecutively scored 36% each time on three 25-card series (chance being 20%). However, over time, Linzmayer's scores began to drop down much closer to (but still above) chance averages. Boredom, distraction, and competing obligations, on Linzmayer's part, were conjectured as possible factors bearing on the declining test results. Linzmayer's epic run of naming 21 out of 25 took place in Rhine's car.

The following year, Rhine tested another promising individual, Hubert Pearce, who managed to surpass Linzmayer's overall 1931 performance. (Pearce's average during the period he was tested in 1932 was 40%, whereas chance would have been 20%.) However, Pearce was actually allowed to handle the cards most of the time. He shuffled and cut them.

The most famous series of experiments from Rhine's laboratory is arguably the ESP tests involving Hubert Pearce and Joseph Gaither Pratt, a research assistant. Pearce was tested (using Zener cards) by Pratt, who shuffled and recorded the order of the cards in the parapsychology lab 100 yards from where Pearce was sitting in a campus library cubicle. The series comprised 37 25-trial runs, conducted between August 1933 and March 1934. From run to run, the number of matches between Pratt's cards and Pearce's guesses was highly variable, generally deviating significantly above chance but also falling dramatically below chance. These scores were obtained irrespective of the distance between Pratt and Pearce, which was arranged as either 100 or 250 yards.

In 1934, drawing upon several years of meticulous lab research and statistical analysis, Rhine published the first edition of a book titled Extra-Sensory Perception, which in various editions was widely read over the next decades. In the later 1930s, Rhine investigated "psychokinesis" – again reducing the subject to simple terms so that it could be tested, with controls, in a laboratory setting. Rhine relied on testing whether a subject could influence the outcome of tossed dice – initially with hand-thrown dice, later with dice thrown from a cup, and finally with machine-thrown dice.

In 1940 Rhine co-authored with Joseph Gaither Pratt and other associates at Duke Extra-Sensory Perception After Sixty Years, a review of all experimental studies of clairvoyance and telepathy. It has been recognized as the first meta-analysis in the history of science. During the war years, Rhine lost most of his male staff members to war work or the military. This caused something of a hiatus in new research, but the opportunity was taken to publish the large backlog of experiments conducted since the early 1930s on psychokinesis. After the war, he had occasion to study some dramatic cases outside the lab.

Rhine's wife, Louisa E. Rhine, pursued work that complemented her husband's in the later 1940s, gathering information on spontaneous ESP reports (experiences people had, outside of a laboratory setting). Yet Rhine believed that a good groundwork should be laid in the lab, so that the scientific community might take parapsychology seriously. In the early 1960s, Rhine left Duke and founded the Institute for Parapsychology, which later became the Foundation for Research on the Nature of Man.

== Legacy ==
Rhine, along with William McDougall, introduced the term "parapsychology" (translating a German term coined by Max Dessoir). It is sometimes said that Rhine almost single-handedly developed a methodology and concepts for parapsychology as a form of experimental psychology. But however great his contributions, some earlier work along similar — analytical and statistical — lines had been undertaken sporadically in Europe, notably the experimental work of Oliver Lodge.

Rhine founded the institutions necessary for parapsychology's continuing professionalization in the U.S. — including the establishment of the Journal of Parapsychology and the formation of the Parapsychological Association, and also the Foundation for Research on the Nature of Man (FRNM), a precursor to what is today known as the Rhine Research Center.

He also had a huge influence on science fiction after John W. Campbell became obsessed with his theories about psionic powers and ideas about future human evolution.

== Reception ==
Rhine's results have never been duplicated by the scientific community.

A number of psychological departments attempted to repeat Rhine's experiments but failed. W. S. Cox (1936) from Princeton University with 132 subjects produced 25,064 trials in a playing-card ESP experiment. Cox concluded "There is no evidence of extrasensory perception either in the 'average man' or of the group investigated or in any particular individual of that group. The discrepancy between these results and those obtained by Rhine is due either to uncontrollable factors in experimental procedure or to the difference in the subjects." Four other psychological departments failed to replicate Rhine's results.

The American psychologist James Charles Crumbaugh attempted to repeat Rhine's findings over a long period without success. Crumbaugh wrote:

At the time [1938] of performing the experiments involved I fully expected that they would yield easily all the final answers. I did not imagine that after 28 years I would still be in as much doubt as when I had begun. I repeated a number of the then current Duke techniques, but the results of 3,024 runs [one run consists of twenty-five guesses] of the ESP cards as much work as Rhine reported in his first book-were all negative. In 1940 I utilized further methods with high school students, again with negative results.

It was charged that Rhine's experiments into extrasensory perception (ESP) contained methodological flaws. The psychologists Leonard Zusne and Warren Jones have written that "the keeping of records in Rhine’s experiments was inadequate. Sometimes, the subject would help with the checking of his or her calls against the order of cards. In some long-distance telepathy experiments, the order of the cards passed through the hands of the percipient before it got from Rhine to the agent."

According to science writer Terence Hines:

The methods the Rhines used to prevent subjects from gaining hints and clues as to the design on the cards were far from adequate. In many experiments, the cards were displayed face up, but hidden behind a small wooden shield. Several ways of obtaining information about the design on the card remain even in the presence of the shield. For instance, the subject may be able sometimes to see the design on the face-up card reflected in the agent’s glasses. Even if the agent isn’t wearing glasses it is possible to see the reflection in his cornea.

In 1938, Harold Gulliksen wrote that Rhine did not describe his experimental methods clearly and used inappropriate mathematical procedures which overestimated the significance of his results. Rhine published Extra-Sensory Perception After Sixty Years in 1940 with a number of colleagues, to address the objections raised. In the book, Rhine and his colleagues described three experiments—the Pearce-Pratt experiment, the Pratt-Woodruff experiment and the Ownbey-Zirkle series—which they believed demonstrated ESP. The psychologist C. E. M. Hansel wrote "it is now known that each experiment contained serious flaws that escaped notice in the examination made by the authors of Extra-Sensory Perception After Sixty Years".

Rhine's experiments involving psychokinesis (PK) were not replicated by other scientists.

According to science fiction writer John Sladek:

His research used dice, with subjects 'willing' them to fall a certain way. Not only can dice be drilled, shaved, falsely numbered and manipulated, but even straight dice often show bias in the long run. Casinos for this reason retire dice often, but at Duke, subjects continued to try for the same effect on the same dice over long experimental runs. Not surprisingly, PK appeared at Duke and nowhere else.

The science writer Martin Gardner wrote that Rhine repeatedly tried to replicate his work, but produced only failures that he never reported. Gardner criticized Rhine for not disclosing the names of assistants he caught cheating:

His paper "Security Versus Deception in Parapsychology" published in his journal (vol. 38, 1974), runs to 23 pages... Rhine selects twelve sample cases of dishonest experimenters that came to his attention from 1940 to 1950, four of whom were caught 'red-handed'. Not a single name is mentioned. What papers did they publish, one wonders?

This has suggested to Gardner that Rhine practiced a "secrecy policy". Gardner mentioned inside information that files in Rhine's laboratory contain material suggesting fraud on the part of Hubert Pearce. Pearce was never able to obtain above-chance results when persons other than the experimenter were present during an experiment, making it more likely that he was cheating in some way. Rhine's other subjects were only able to obtain non-chance levels when they were able to shuffle the cards, which has suggested they used tricks to arrange the order of the Zener cards before the experiments started. Rhine's colleague Walter Levy was exposed as falsifying data for an animal ESP test, which harmed the reputation of Rhine and of parapsychology, regardless of whether Rhine was personally involved.

According to James Alcock, due to Rhine's errors, parapsychologists no longer utilize card-guessing studies.

Rhine has been described as credulous as he believed the horse "Lady Wonder" was telepathic but it was discovered the owner was using subtle signals to control the horse's behavior.

Historian Ruth Brandon has written that Rhine's research was not balanced or objective, instead "motivated by the most extreme ideology" of vitalism.

== Books ==
- Rhine, J. B. (1934). Extra-Sensory Perception. Boston, MA, US: Bruce Humphries.
- Rhine, J. B. (1937). New Frontiers of the Mind. New York, NY, US.
- Rhine, J. B., Pratt, J. G., Stuart, C. E., Smith, B. M., Greenwood, J. A. (1940). Extra-Sensory Perception After Sixty Years. New York, NY, US: Henry Holt.
- Rhine, J. B. (1947). The Reach of the Mind. New York, NY, US: William Sloane.
- Rhine, J. B. (1953). New World of the Mind. New York, NY, US: William Sloane.
- Rhine, J. B., & Pratt, J. G. (1957). Parapsychology: Frontier Science of the Mind. Springfield, IL, US Charles C. Thomas.
- Rhine, J. B., & Associates (Eds.). (1965). Parapsychology from Duke to FRNM. Durham, NC, US: Parapsychology Press.
- Rhine, J. B., & Brier, R. (Eds.). (1968). Parapsychology Today. New York, NY, US: Citadel.
- Rhine, J. B. (Ed.). (1971). Progress in Parapsychology. Durham, NC, US: Parapsychology Press.
