= Leonard Zusne =

American psychologist

Leonard Zusne (1924–2003) was an American psychologist.

He published articles and books on the history of psychology, magical thinking and visual perception. Zusne worked as a Professor of Psychology at the University of Tulsa. A critic of paranormal claims, he was influential in the field of anomalistic psychology.

== Publications ==
- Visual Perception of Form (1970)
- Biographical Dictionary of Psychology (1984)
- Magical Thinking and Parapsychology. In A Skeptic’s Handbook of Parapsychology. Edited by Paul Kurtz. Prometheus Books. pp. 685–700. ISBN 0-87975-300-5
- Eponyms in Psychology: A Dictionary and Biographical Sourcebook (1987)
- Anomalistic Psychology: A Study of Magical Thinking [with Warren H. Jones] (1989)
