= Louisa E. Rhine =

Botanist and parapsychologist

Louisa Ella Rhine
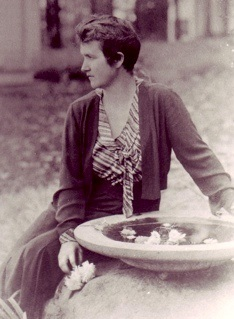
- Born: November 9, 1891; New York State
- Died: March 17, 1983 (aged 91)
- Citizenship: United States
- Education: University of Chicago
- Scientific career
- Fields: Parapsychology, Botany
- Workplaces: Duke University

Louisa Ella Rhine (née Weckesser November 9, 1891 – March 17, 1983) was an American doctor of botany and is known for her work in parapsychology. At the time of her death, she was recognized as the foremost researcher of spontaneous psychic experiences, and has been referred to as the "first lady of parapsychology."

== Life ==
Rhine was born Louisa Ella Weckesser on an island in the Niagara River, New York on November 9, 1891. Her parents were Christian Weckesser, a gardener, orchardist, and farmer, and Ella Weckesser. The oldest of nine children, Rhine grew up in northern Ohio.

In 1920, she married J. B. Rhine, a fellow graduate student in botany. In 1927, the Rhines relocated to Durham, North Carolina, where they raised four children together.

== Education ==
Influenced by her father's interest in plants, Rhine chose to study plant physiology. She attended the College of Wooster before obtaining her Bachelor of Science, Master of Science, and Ph.D., all in Botany, from the University of Chicago.

== Career ==
After serving as a research fellow in plant physiology at the Boyce Institute for Plant Research in Yonkers, New York, Rhine moved to Morgantown, West Virginia, where both she and her husband taught at West Virginia University. While there, she and her husband became interested in parapsychology, and left to train with Dr. Walter Franklin Prince of the Boston Society of Psychic Research from 1926 to 1927. The following year, they moved to Durham, North Carolina, where her husband had been recruited to the faculty to work under William McDougall at Duke University to help launch the university's parapsychology department.

In 1928, Rhine stopped working after she and her husband adopted a son, Robert.

Through the American Association of University Women, Rhine and Mary Octavine Thompson Cowper of Durham founded the Durham Nursery School, which was the first nursery school created for children of working women.

Additionally, Rhine worked with other Durham women to form the Durham Chapter of the League of Women Voters, and she pushed a bookmobile as a Gray Lady at Camp Butner during World War II. In 1948, Rhine returned to academia, and she began to work part-time at the parapsychology lab, where she took over a project of reading and responding to letters from people who had heard about the lab's work. This work led to her full-time focus on case studies of psychic experiences. She analyzed thousands of real-life experiences from the letters people sent to her, and she laid the groundwork for their classification.

== Selected works ==
- Rhine, Louisa E. (1961). Hidden Channels of the Mind. New York: W. Sloane Associates.
- Rhine, Louisa E. (1966). Manual for Introductory Experiments in Parapsychology. Durham, NC: Institute for Parapsychology.
- Louisa E. Rhine (1967), ESP in life and lab: Tracing Hidden Channels, New York Macmillan
- Rhine, Louisa E. (1970). Mind Over Matter: Psychokinesis. New York: Macmillan.
- Rhine, Louisa E. (1975). Psi, What is it?: The Story of ESP and PK (1st ed.). New York: Harper & Row. ISBN 9780060668266.
- Rhine, Louisa E. (1981). The Invisible Picture: A Study of Psychic Experiences. Jefferson, NC: McFarland. ISBN 9780899500157.
- Rhine, Louisa E. (1983). Something Hidden. Jefferson, N.C.: McFarland. ISBN 9780899500829.
