= Terence Hines =

American professor of neurology and science writer

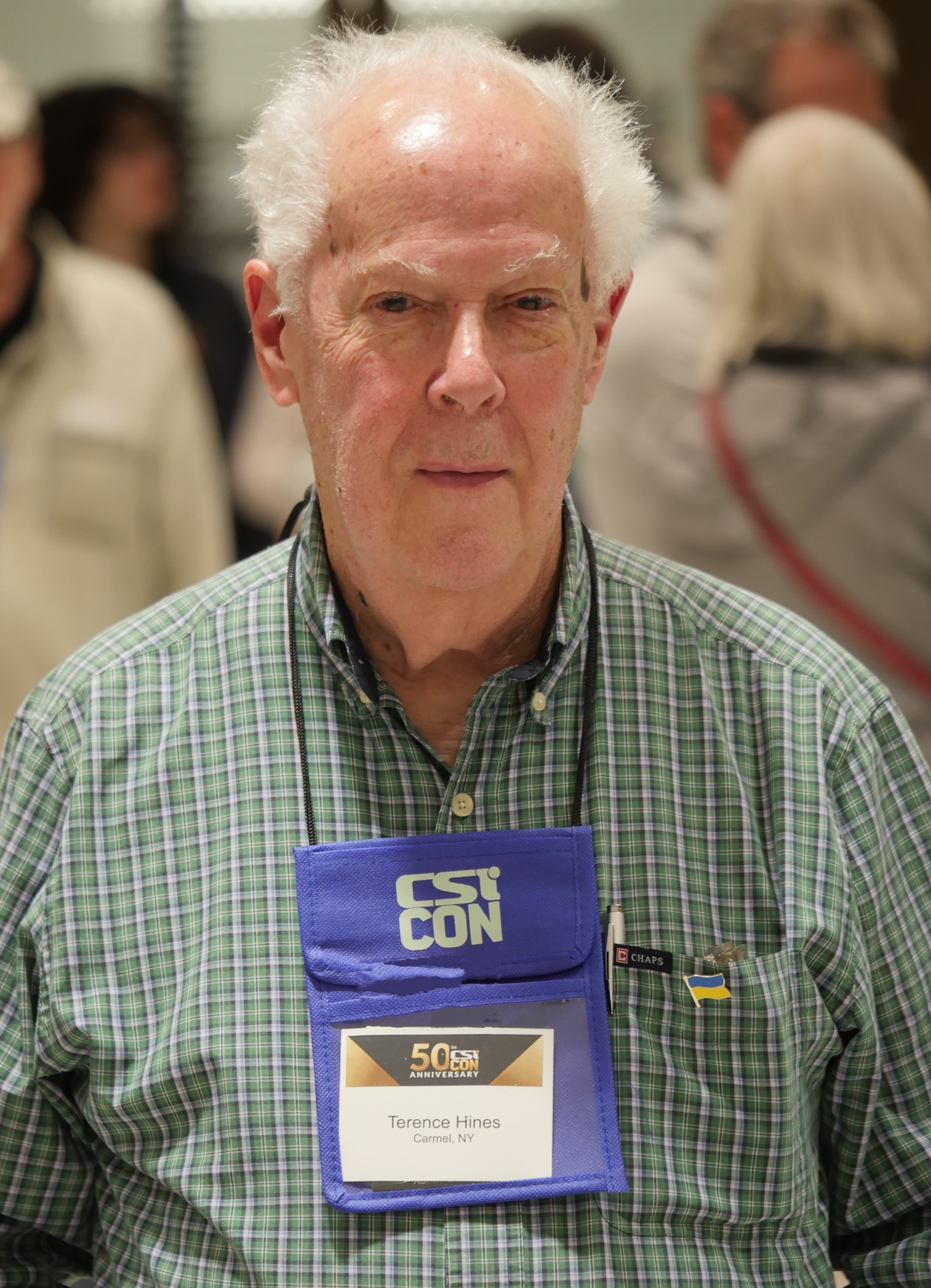
- Terence Hines at CSICon 2026
- Born: Terence Michael Hines; 22 March 1951 (age 75); Hanover, New Hampshire, United States
- Occupation: Professor of psychology
- Spouse: Sarah Johnson

Terence Michael Hines (born 22 March 1951) is an American academic and researcher. A fellow of the Committee for Skeptical Inquiry, Hines is the author of Pseudoscience and the Paranormal which focuses on the fields of pseudoscience and the paranormal in the United States. He has also, controversially, authored papers expressing doubts about the existence of the G-spot.

== Early life and education ==
Hines attended Hanover High School. He has a BA from Duke University where he studied cognitive psychology and neuroscience, and an MA and PhD from the University of Oregon. He was a post-doctoral research fellow at the Neurology Department at Cornell University Medical College.

== Career ==
Hines is a professor of psychology at Pace University, Pleasantville, New York, and adjunct professor of neurology at the New York Medical College; he is also a science writer with 42 publications.

== Pseudoscience and the Paranormal ==
Hines is the author of the book Pseudoscience and the Paranormal, which mostly focuses on pseudoscience and the paranormal in the United States. He distinguishes pseudoscience from science by describing it as a hypothesis inconsistent with the known laws of physics, and one which cannot be falsified. In his book, Hines argues that pseudoscience tends not to be updated in the face of newly obtained evidence, and he highlights the difficulty in clearly demarcating pseudoscience from the paranormal. He also postulates that if paranormal abilities such as clairvoyance or precognition were possible, then surely one would expect casino and lottery incomes to be affected, although no such effect is observed.

Hines is a fellow of the Committee for Skeptical Inquiry, whose mission is to promote scientific inquiry, critical investigation, and the use of reason in examining controversial and extraordinary claims.

== G-spot ==
In a 2001 comprehensive review article, Hines claimed that the evidence for the existence of the Gräfenberg spot ("G-spot"), a spot that 84% of women believe exists, was too weak, and that claims of its existence were based on small sample sizes and not supported by biochemistry or anatomy (particularly the lack of extra nerve endings in the region). Most of the studies at that time had been conducted by a single team. Hines asserted that if such a spot exists, it is not particular to the Skene's glands. He described the G-spot as a "sort of gynecologic UFO: much sought for, much discussed, but unverified by objective means". The initial review resulted in a large controversy with three publications quickly defending its existence. A more recent review concluded that the existence of the structure remains unproved.

== Works ==
- Pseudoscience and the Paranormal: A Critical Examination of the Evidence (1st ed.). Buffalo, N.Y.: Prometheus Books. 1988. ISBN 978-0-87975-419-8.
- Pseudoscience and the Paranormal (2nd ed.). Amherst, N.Y.: Prometheus Books. 2003. ISBN 978-1-57392-979-0.
