= Extrasensory perception =

Claims of perceiving information by a 6th sense, the mind

Extrasensory perception (ESP), also known as a sixth sense, or cryptaesthesia, is a claimed paranormal ability pertaining to reception of information not gained through the recognized physical senses, but sensed with the mind. The term was adopted by Duke University botanist J. B. Rhine to denote psychic abilities such as telepathy, psychometry, clairvoyance and their trans-temporal operation as precognition or retrocognition.

Second sight is an alleged form of extrasensory perception, whereby a person perceives information, in the form of a vision, about future events before they happen (precognition), or about things or events at remote locations (remote viewing). There is no good evidence that second sight exists. Reports of second sight are known only from anecdotes. Second sight and ESP are classified as pseudosciences.

== History ==
Zener cards were first used in the 1930s for experimental research into ESP.

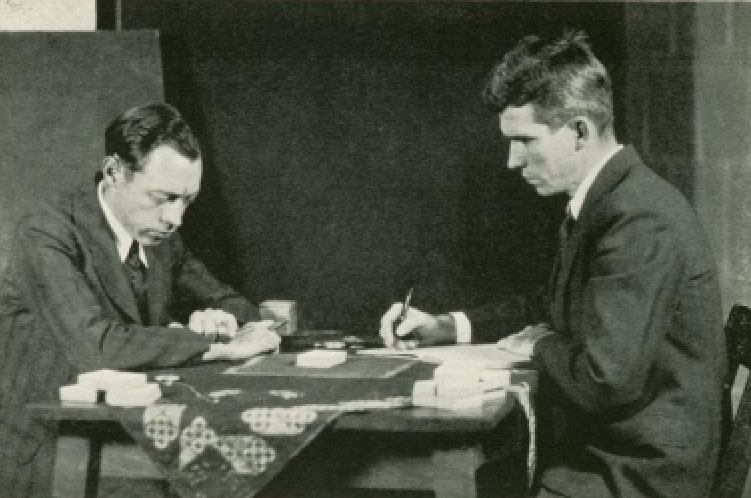
Hubert Pearce with J. B. Rhine

In the 1930s, at Duke University in North Carolina, J. B. Rhine and his wife Louisa E. Rhine conducted an investigation into extrasensory perception. While Louisa Rhine concentrated on collecting accounts of spontaneous cases, J. B. Rhine worked largely in the laboratory, carefully defining terms such as ESP and psi (parapsychology) and designing experiments to test them. A simple set of black and white cards was developed, originally called Zener cards – now called ESP cards. They bear the symbols circle, square, wavy lines, cross, and star. There are five of each type of card in a pack of 25.

In a telepathy experiment, the "sender" looks at a series of cards while the "receiver" guesses the symbols. To try to observe clairvoyance, the pack of cards is hidden from everyone while the receiver guesses. To try to observe precognition, the order of the cards is determined after the guesses are made. Later he used dice to test for psychokinesis.

The parapsychology experiments at Duke evoked criticism from academics and others who challenged the concepts and evidence of ESP. A number of psychological departments attempted, unsuccessfully, to repeat Rhine's experiments. W. S. Cox (1936) from Princeton University with 132 subjects produced 25,064 trials in a playing card ESP experiment. Cox concluded "There is no evidence of extrasensory perception either in the 'average man' or of the group investigated or in any particular individual of that group. The discrepancy between these results and those obtained by Rhine is due either to uncontrollable factors in experimental procedure or to the difference in the subjects." Four other psychological departments failed to replicate Rhine's results.

In 1938, the psychologist Joseph Jastrow wrote that much of the evidence for extrasensory perception collected by Rhine and other parapsychologists was anecdotal, biased, dubious and the result of "faulty observation and familiar human frailties". Rhine's experiments were discredited due to the discovery that sensory leakage or cheating could account for all his results such as the subject being able to read the symbols from the back of the cards and being able to see and hear the experimenter to note subtle clues.

In the 1960s, parapsychologists became increasingly interested in the cognitive components of ESP, the subjective experience involved in making ESP responses, and the role of ESP in psychological life. This called for experimental procedures that were not limited to Rhine's favored forced-choice methodology. Such procedures have included dream telepathy experiments, and the ganzfeld experiments (a mild sensory deprivation procedure).

Second sight may have originally been so called because normal vision was regarded as coming first, while supernormal vision is a secondary thing, confined to certain individuals. An dà shealladh or "the two sights", meaning "the sight of the seer", is the way Gaels refer to "second sight", the involuntary ability of seeing the future or distant events. There are many Gaelic words for the various aspects of second sight, but an dà shealladh is the one mostly recognized by non-Gaelic speakers, even though, strictly speaking, it does not really mean second sight, but rather "two sights". (Note: "The term da-shealladh (pronounced "dah-haloo"), often translated as "second sight", literally means "two sights". It refers to the ability to see apparitions of both the living and the dead. The taibshear (pronounced "tysher") is the seer who specializes in observing the energy double (taibhs). A dream or vision is a bruadar ("broo-e-tar"). The bruadaraiche ("broo-e-taracher") is more than a dreamer in the common sense; he or she is the kind of dreamer who can see into the past or the future.")

== Skepticism ==
Parapsychology is the study of paranormal psychic phenomena, including ESP. Parapsychology has been criticized for continuing investigation despite being unable to provide convincing evidence for the existence of any psychic phenomena after more than a century of research. The scientific community rejects ESP due to the absence of an evidence base, the lack of a theory which would explain ESP and the lack of positive experimental results; it considers ESP to be pseudoscience.

The scientific consensus does not view extrasensory perception as a scientific phenomenon. Skeptics have pointed out that there is no viable theory to explain the mechanism behind ESP, and that there are historical cases in which flaws have been discovered in the experimental design of parapsychological studies.

There are many criticisms pertaining to experiments involving extrasensory perception, particularly surrounding methodological flaws. These flaws are not unique to a single experimental design, and are effective in discrediting much of the positive research surrounding ESP. Many of the flaws seen in the Zener cards experiment are present in the Ganzfeld experiment as well. First is the stacking effect, an error that occurs in ESP research. Trial-by-trial feedback given in studies using a "closed" ESP target sequence (e.g., a deck of cards) violates the condition of independence used for most standard statistical tests. Multiple responses for a single target cannot be evaluated using statistical tests that assume independence of responses. This increases the likelihood of card counting and, in turn, increases the chances for the subject to guess correctly without using ESP. Another methodological flaw involves cues through sensory leakage, for example, when the subject receives a visual cue. This could be the reflection of a Zener card in the holder's glasses. In this case, the subject is able to guess the card correctly because they can see it in the reflection, not because of ESP. Finally, poor randomization of target stimuli could be happening. Poor shuffling methods can make the orders of the cards easier to predict, or the cards could have been marked and manipulated, again, making it easier to predict which cards come next. The results of a meta-analysis found that when these errors were corrected and accounted for, there was still no significant effect of ESP. Many of the studies only appeared to have significant occurrence of ESP, when in fact, this result was due to the many methodological errors in the research.

=== Dermo-optical perception ===
In the early 20th century, Joaquin María Argamasilla, known as the "Spaniard with X-ray Eyes", claimed to be able to read handwriting or numbers on dice through closed metal boxes. Argamasilla managed to fool Gustav Geley and Charles Richet into believing he had genuine psychic powers. In 1924, he was exposed by Harry Houdini as a fraud. Argamasilla peeked through his simple blindfold and lifted the edge of the box, so he could look inside it without others noticing.

Science writer Martin Gardner has written that the ignorance of blindfold deception methods has been widespread in investigations into objects at remote locations from persons who claim to possess second sight. Gardner documented various conjuring techniques psychics such as Rosa Kuleshova, Lina Anderson and Nina Kulagina have used to peek from their blindfolds to deceive investigators into believing they used second sight.

== See also ==
- Extrasensory Perception (book)
- Inner eye
- List of psychic abilities
- List of topics characterized as pseudoscience
- Magic
- Outline of parapsychology
- Superpower (ability)
- Stargate Project (U.S. Army unit)
