= Deathbed phenomena =

Range of experiences reported by dying people

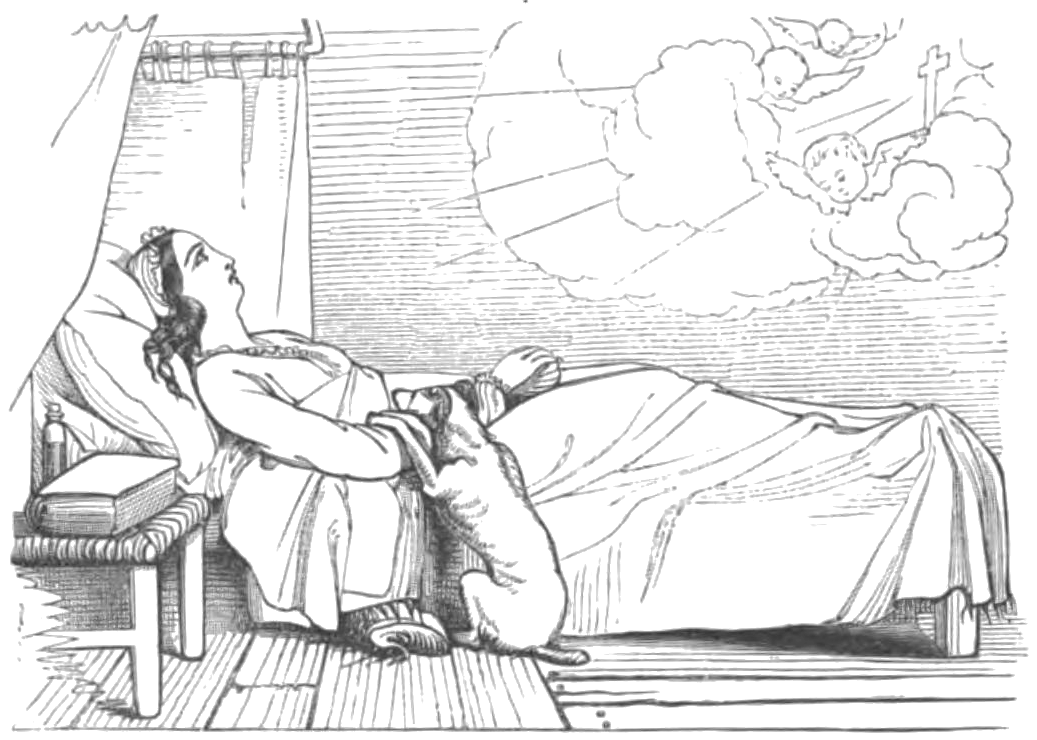
Illustration of a person seeing visions of "a bright world of angels, with the Redeemer in the midst" while lying ill in bed, from the 1844 short story A Forlorn Hope

Deathbed phenomena refers to a range of paranormal experiences claimed by people who are dying. There are many examples of deathbed phenomena in both non-fiction and fictional literature, which suggests that these occurrences have been noted by cultures around the world for centuries, although scientific study of them is relatively recent. In scientific literature such experiences have been referred to as death-related sensory experiences (DRSE). Dying patients have reported to staff working in hospices they have experienced comforting visions.

Modern scientists consider deathbed phenomena and visions to be hallucinations.

== Deathbed visions ==
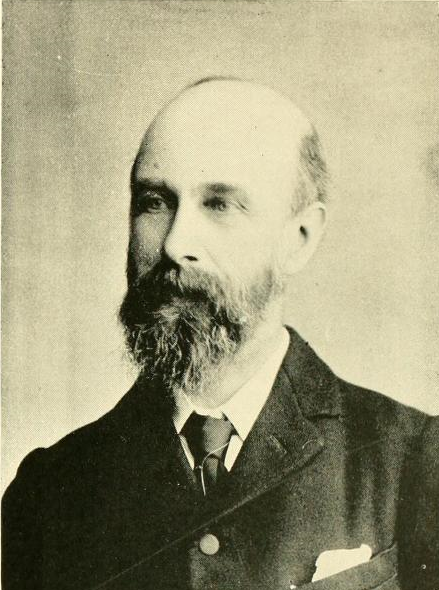
William F. Barrett, early deathbed phenomena researcher.

Deathbed visions have been described since ancient times, but the first systematic study was not conducted until the 20th century. They have also been referred to as "veridical hallucinations", "visions of the dying" and "predeath visions". The physician William F. Barrett, author of the book Death-Bed Visions (1926), collected anecdotes of people who had claimed to have experienced visions of deceased friends and relatives, the sound of music and other deathbed phenomena. Barrett was a Christian spiritualist and believed the visions were evidence for spirit communication.

In a study conducted between 1959 and 1973, parapsychologists Karlis Osis and Erlendur Haraldsson reported that 50% of the tens of thousands of individuals they studied in the United States and India had experienced deathbed visions. Osis, Haraldsson, and other parapsychologists, such as Raymond Moody, interpreted the reports as evidence for an afterlife.

The neurologist Terence Hines has written that the proponents of the afterlife interpretation grossly underestimate the variability among the reports. Hines also criticized their methodology of collecting the reports:

The way in which the reports are collected poses another serious problem for those who want to take them seriously as evidence of an afterlife. Osis and Haraldsson’s (1977) study was based on replies received from ten thousand questionnaires sent to doctors and nurses in the United States and India. Only 6.4 percent were returned. Since it was the doctors and nurses who were giving the reports, not the patients who had, presumably, actually had the experience, the reports were secondhand. This means they had passed through two highly fallible and constructive human memory systems (the doctor’s or nurse’s and the actual patient’s) before reaching Osis and Haraldsson. In other cases (i.e., Moody 1977) the reports were given by the patients themselves, months and years after the event. Such reports are hardly sufficient to argue for the reality of an afterlife.

The skeptical investigator Joe Nickell has written that deathbed visions (DBVs) are based on anecdotal accounts that are unreliable. Nickell discovered contradictions and inconsistencies in various DBVs reported by the paranormal author Carla Wills-Brandon.

Research in the hospice and palliative medicine field has examined the impact of deathbed phenomena on the dying, their families, and palliative care staff. In 2009, a questionnaire was distributed to 111 staff members in an Irish hospice program, asking whether they had encountered staff or patients who had experienced DBP. The majority of respondents reported that they had been informed of a deathbed vision by a patient or the patient's family. They reported that the content of these visions often seemed to be comforting to the patient and their family. Another study found that DBPs are commonly associated with peaceful death and are generally under-reported by patients and families due to fear of embarrassment and disbelief from medical staff.

In response to these qualitative data, there is a growing movement within the palliative care field that emphasizes "compassionate understanding and respect from those who provide end-of-life care" in regard to DBPs. Reports of deathbed visions frequently describe the figures perceived as deceased relatives or friends, and researchers have noted that apparitions of the dead predominate at the deathbed, in contrast to the apparitions of living people more commonly reported by people in good health. A subset of these cases is known as "Peak in Darien" experiences, named after an 1882 collection of essays with that title by the Irish writer Frances Power Cobbe. The term describes situations wherein a dying person seems to see a specific deceased individual whose death was, at the time, unknown to them. Writers sympathetic to a survivalist interpretation have argued that such reports are not readily explained as expectation-driven hallucinations, since the percipient did not know that the person had died. A 2010 paper by Bruce Greyson of the University of Virginia's Division of Perceptual Studies compiled and discussed several examples. Skeptics respond that the accounts are retrospective and anecdotal, that the timing of the unrecognised death is seldom independently documented, and that deceased relatives commonly feature in drug-induced and other hallucinations as well.

== Scientific evaluation ==
According to Ronald K. Siegel, noted American psychopharmacologist and researcher, there is a high degree of similarity between deathbed visions and drug-induced hallucinations. Hallucinations caused by drugs frequently contain images of otherworldly beings and deceased friends and relatives. Some scientists who have studied cases of deathbed phenomena have described the visual, auditory, and sensed presences of deceased relatives or angelic beings during the dying process as hallucinations. These hallucinations are theorized to occur due to a number of explanations including but not limited to cerebral hypoxia, confusion, delirium, body systems failures (e.g., renal, hepatic, pulmonary), and a mental reaction to stress.

When the body is injured, or if the heart stops, even if only for a short period, the brain is deprived of oxygen. A short period of cerebral hypoxia can result in the impairment of neuronal function. It is theorized that this neuronal impairment accounts for deathbed visions.

== See also ==
- Deathbed confession
- Deathbed conversion
