= Stephen E. Braude =

American philosopher and parapsychologist (1945–2026)

- Born: Stephen Edward Braude; April 17, 1945
- Died: January 3, 2026 (aged 80)
- Education: University of Massachusetts Amherst
- Occupations: Philosopher, parapsychologist

Stephen Edward Braude (April 17, 1945 – January 3, 2026) was an American philosopher and parapsychologist. He was a president of the Parapsychological Association, Editor-in-Chief of the Journal of Scientific Exploration, and a professor of philosophy at the University of Maryland, Baltimore County.

== Career ==
Braude received his Ph.D. in philosophy from the University of Massachusetts Amherst in 1971. After working as a lecturer in the philosophy department at the University of Massachusetts Amherst, he found a permanent home at the University of Maryland, Baltimore County, working successively as an assistant, associate, and full professor. He served as the Chair of the Philosophy department between 1998 and 2005. He received numerous fellowships, awards, and grants including the National Endowment for the Humanities Research Fellowship, numerous grants from the Parapsychology Foundation, and the Distinguished Achievement Award of the International Society for the Study of Dissociation. He also received several Faculty Research Grants from UMBC.

=== Parapsychology ===
Braude was a past president of the Parapsychological Association, and the Editor-in-Chief for the Journal of Scientific Exploration. Braude was a researcher in psychic phenomena; his work has therefore been called pseudoscience.

Philosophers Ronald Giere and Patrick Grim have praised Braude's work in philosophy but have written his parapsychological claims about psychokinesis being scientifically proven are based on assumption, not scientific evidence. The British philosopher Antony Flew criticized Braude's book The Limits of Influence: Psychokinesis and the Philosophy of Science for defending fraudulent mediums such as Eusapia Palladino and ignoring skeptical literature on the subject.

Wendy Grossman in New Scientist wrote that Braude's book The Limits of Influence: Psychokinesis and the Philosophy of Science (1986) relied on anecdotal evidence and eyewitness testimony of séances with physical mediums, in particular, Eusapia Palladino and Daniel Dunglas Home, to prove that psi exists. According to Grossman "[Braude] accuses sceptics of ignoring the evidence he believes is solid, but himself ignores evidence that does not suit him. If a medium was caught cheating on some occasions, he says, the rest of that medium's phenomena were still genuine." Grossman came to the conclusion that Braude did not do proper research on the subject and should study "the art of conjuring."

Braude claimed the medium Daniel Dunglas Home was never caught in fraud, however the psychologist Andrew Neher has written he was detected in fraud by at least four people on different occasions. Braude has also claimed Ted Serios had genuine psychic ability. This is in opposition to magicians and scientists who exposed sleight of hand tricks he used. In an article in New Scientist titled "The Chance of a Lifetime" (March 24, 2007), an interview appears with the noted mathematician and magician Persi Diaconis. During the interview Persi mentioned that Martin Gardner had paid him to watch Ted Serios perform, during which Persi caught Serios sneaking a small marble with a photograph on it into the little tube attached to the front of the camera he used. "It was," Persi said, "a trick."

Braude's latest book in defense of the paranormal is The Gold Leaf Lady and Other Parapsychological Investigations (2007). According to the British psychologist Chris French the book consists of anecdotes that fail to prove the existence of psi. French gave the book a negative review and wrote "I would be surprised if any reader with the slightest tendency towards critical thinking would find the evidence for psi presented in this slim volume to be anywhere near compelling."

Braude believed his wife, Gina, could produce astrological predictions.

In 2014, he was awarded the Myers Memorial Medal by the Society for Psychical Research for his "significant contributions to psychical research".

== Death ==
Braude died on January 3, 2026, at the age of 80.
