= Charles Bailey (medium) =

Australian apport medium

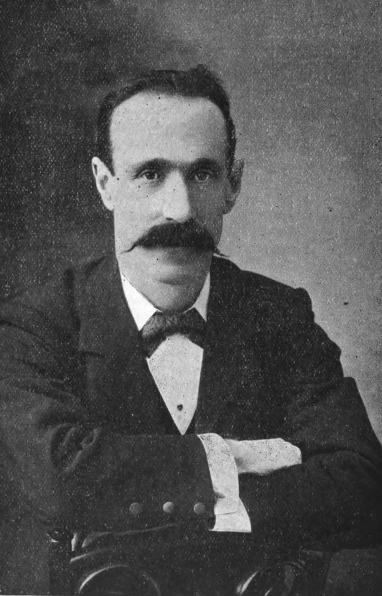
- Occupation: Spiritualist medium

Charles Bailey (1870–1947) was an Australian apport medium who was exposed as a fraud.

== Career ==
Bailey was born in Melbourne. He worked as a bootmaker and became a famous apport medium. He claimed with the help of his spirit guide "Abdul" that he could apport live items such as fish, crabs, turtles, coins, stones and antiques in the séance room.

In 1910, Bailey was exposed as a fraud in Grenoble, France. He produced two live birds but was unaware that the dealer who he had bought the birds from was present in the séance. According to Joseph McCabe before the séance he had hidden the birds in the "unpleasant end of his alimentary canal".

Bailey was endorsed by Thomas Welton Stanford a wealthy spiritualist who had help fund the psychical research programme at Stanford University. He was also supported by the spiritualist Arthur Conan Doyle. However, most psychical researchers dismissed Bailey as fraudulent. The psychologist John Edgar Coover held strong doubts about Bailey and noted he been exposed as a fraud several times, most notably by the Society for Psychical Research.

He was notable for producing apports of ancient tablets and other antiquities during his séances. Some of these were examined by the British Museum who concluded they were forgeries. Bailey was further exposed at a séance in 1914 in Sydney when a sitter pulled the drapery off a materialized "spirit".
