= Robert McConnell =

Robert McConnell may refer to:

- Sir Robert McConnell, 1st Baronet (1853–1927), Lord Mayor of Belfast, 1900–1901
- Robert McConnell (loyalist) (1944–1976), Northern Irish loyalist
- Robert W. McConnell (1806–1862), early settler in Illinois, namesake of McConnell, Illinois
- Rob McConnell (1935–2010), Canadian jazz valve trombonist and composer
- Brian McConnell, Baron McConnell (Robert William Brian McConnell, 1922–2000), Ulster Unionist MP in the Northern Ireland House of Commons
- Bertie McConnell (Robert Dodd McConnell, 1921–1994), Army officer and politician in Northern Ireland
- R. A. McConnell (1914–2006), American physicist and parapsychologist
- Bob McConnell (1925–2012), founding member of the Society for American Baseball Research
- Robert McConnell of the McConnell baronets
