= Robert G. Jahn =

American plasma physicist

- Born: Robert George Jahn; April 1, 1930; Kearny, New Jersey, U.S.
- Died: November 15, 2017 (aged 87)
- Education: Princeton University (BSE, MA, PhD)
- Scientific career
- Fields: Physics, Parapsychology
- Workplaces: Lehigh University; California Institute of Technology; Princeton University
- Thesis: The refraction of shock waves at a gaseous interface (1955)
- Notable students: Alec Gallimore

Robert George Jahn (April 1, 1930 – November 15, 2017) was an American plasma physicist, Professor of Aerospace Science, and Dean of Engineering at Princeton University. Jahn was also a founder of the Princeton Engineering Anomalies Research Lab (PEAR), a parapsychology research program which ran from 1979 to 2007.

== Career ==
Jahn held a B.S.E. degree in Engineering Physics (1951), a M.A. Degree in Physics (1953), and a Ph.D. degree in Physics (1955), all from Princeton University, and held faculty positions in Physics Department at Lehigh University, at the California Institute of Technology, and, since 1962, at Princeton. He also worked at the NASA Lewis Research Center.

During his career, Jahn worked on electrically powered spacecraft propulsion and directed several major research programs in advanced aerospace propulsion systems, in cooperation with NASA and the U.S. Air Force. In 1961, he founded the Electric Propulsion and Plasma Dynamics Laboratory at Princeton and directed it for more than three decades. He served as Dean of the School of Engineering and Applied Science at Princeton from 1971 - 1986.

Jahn was a fellow of the American Institute of Aeronautics and Astronautics and was chairman of its Electric Propulsion Technical Committee. He was a member of the NASA Space Science and Technology Advisory Committee and a member of the board of directors of Hercules Inc. from 1985 to 2001, where he served as chairman of its Technology Committee. He also served on the Emergency Committee, the Nominating Committee, and the Social Responsibility Committee. He resigned from the Hercules Inc. board in 2001 at the age of 70.

Jahn was the chairman of the Elwing company which manufactures propulsion systems for satellites until his death.

== Parapsychology Studies ==
Jahn also engaged in the study of psychokinesis ("PK") for many years. With Brenda Dunne, he established the Princeton Engineering Anomalies Research Lab (PEAR) in 1979 following an undergraduate project to study purported low-level psychokinetic effects on electronic random event generators. Over the years, Jahn and Dunne claim to have created a wealth of small-physical-scale, statistically significant results that they claim suggested direct causal relationships between subjects' intention and otherwise random results.

Experiments under Jahn's purview also explored remote viewing and other topics in parapsychology. In 1982, at the invitation of the editors of Proceedings of the IEEE, Jahn published a comprehensive review of psychic phenomena from an engineering perspective. A subsequent critique of this review by psychologist Ray Hyman, which was also invited by the journal's editors, discussed Jahn's work in the context of a long history of flawed psychic research. Psychologist James Alcock carried out an extensive review of Jahn's research and found there to be "serious methodological problems". Statistical flaws in Jahn's work have been proposed by physicist Stanley Jeffers. Jahn closed the PEAR lab in 2007.

== Honors and awards ==
Jahn was the vice President of the Society for Scientific Exploration until his death. Jahn received an Honorary Doctor of Science degree from Andhra University.

Jahn received the Stuhlinger Medal for "Outstanding Achievement in Electric Propulsion". In 2012 he received their AIAA Wyld Propulsion Award for outstanding achievement in the development or application of rocket propulsion systems.

He wrote the book Margins of Reality: The Role of Consciousness in the Physical World (with B. J. Dunne) and Physics of Electric Propulsion, as well as publications in various technical fields. Many of Jahn's papers on parapsychology appeared in the Journal of Scientific Exploration and similar publications that focus primarily upon fringe science.

His final honor was the 2017 IAC Scientific Award for Contribution to Consciousness Science - Lifetime Achievement, awarded at the 2017 International Congress on Consciousness in Miami.

== Reception ==
In 1984, the United States National Academy of Sciences, at the request of the US Army Research Institute, formed a scientific panel to assess the best evidence from 130 years of parapsychology. Part of its purpose was to investigate military applications of PK, for example to remotely jam or disrupt enemy weaponry. The panel heard from a variety of military staff who believed in PK and made visits to the PEAR laboratory and two other laboratories that had claimed positive results from micro-PK experiments. The panel criticized macro-PK experiments for being open to deception by conjurors, and said that virtually all micro-PK experiments "depart from good scientific practice in a variety of ways". Their conclusion, published in a 1987 report, was that there was no scientific evidence for the existence of psychokinesis.

Science writer Kendrick Frazier wrote that Jahn's experiments were faulted because of failing to randomize the sequence of group trials at each session, inadequate documentation on precautions against data tampering and possibilities of data selection. C. E. M. Hansel, who evaluated Jahn's early psychokinesis experiments at the PEAR laboratory, wrote that a satisfactory control series had not been employed, the experiments had not been independently replicated, and that the reports of the experiments were lacking in detail. Hansel noted that "very little information is provided about the design of the experiment, the subjects, or the procedure adopted. Details are not given about the subjects, the times they were tested, or the precise conditions under which they were tested."

The psychokinesis experiments conducted by Jahn involving "random machines" produced "a very small effect," not large enough to be observed over a brief experiment but, over a large number of trials, able to produce a tiny statistical deviation from chance. The physicist Robert L. Park concludes that it is doubtful that any of the machines used were in fact random since there are no truly random machines; therefore it is possible that the lack of randomness only began to show up after many trials.

Park questioned that if the human mind really could influence matter, then it would be easy for parapsychologists to measure such a phenomenon by using this alleged psychokinetic power to deflect a microbalance, which would not require any dubious statistics; "the reason (they don't), of course, is that the microbalance stubbornly refuses to budge." Park has suggested that the reason statistical studies such as Jahn's are so popular in parapsychology is because they introduce opportunities for uncertainty and error which are used to support the biases of the experimenter. Park wrote "no proof of psychic phenomena is ever found. In spite of all the tests devised by parapsychologists like Jahn and Radin, and huge amounts of data collected over a period of many years, the results are no more convincing today than when they began their experiments."

According to Massimo Pigliucci, the results from PEAR can be explained without invoking the paranormal because of two problems with the experiments: "the difficulty of designing machines capable of generating truly random events, and the fact that statistical "significance" is not at all a good measure of the importance or genuineness of a phenomenon." Pigluicci writes that the statistical analysis used by Jahn and the group at PEAR relied on a quantity called a "p-value," but the problem with p-values is that if the sample size (number of trials) is as large as the one obtained by PEAR, then one is guaranteed to find artificially low p-values, seemingly indicating a statistical "significant" result while nothing other than small biases in the experimental apparatus occurred.

Two German independent scientific groups have failed to replicate the PEAR results. Pigliucci has written this was "yet another indication that the simplest hypothesis is likely to be true: there was nothing to replicate." The physicist Milton Rothman wrote that most of the faculty at Princeton considered the work of PEAR an embarrassment. Robert L. Park said of PEAR, "It’s been an embarrassment to science, and I think an embarrassment for Princeton".

== Publications ==
- The Role of Consciousness in the Physical World (1981)
- “Electric Propulsion” In Encyclopedia of Physical Science and Technology, 3rd Edition. R.A. Myers, ed. San Diego: Academic Press, Vol. 5, pp. 125–141. (2002)
- Consciousness and the Source of Reality: The PEAR Odyssey (2011)
- Physics of Electric Propulsion (2012)
- Quirks of the Quantum Mind (2012)

== See also ==
- Global Consciousness Project
- Princeton Engineering Anomalies Research Lab
