= Global Consciousness Project =

Scientific project about existence of a global consciousness

The Global Consciousness Project (GCP, also called the EGG Project) is a parapsychology experiment begun in 1998 as an attempt to detect possible interactions of "global consciousness" with physical systems. The project monitors a geographically distributed network of hardware random number generators in a bid to identify anomalous outputs that correlate with widespread emotional responses to sets of world events, or periods of focused attention by large numbers of people. The GCP is privately funded through the Institute of Noetic Sciences and describes itself as an international collaboration of about 100 research scientists and engineers.

Skeptics such as Robert T. Carroll, Claus Larsen, and others have questioned the methodology of the Global Consciousness Project, particularly how the data are selected and interpreted, saying the data anomalies reported by the project are the result of "pattern matching" and selection bias which ultimately fail to support a belief in psi or global consciousness. May et al., while stating that the open access to the test data "is a testimony to the integrity and curiosity of those involved", have also concluded that the statistically significant result reported by the published GCP hypothesis in the data for 11 September 2001 was fortuitous, and found that as far as this particular event was concerned an alternative method of analysis gave only chance deviations throughout.

== Background ==
Roger D. Nelson developed the project as an extrapolation of two decades of experiments from the controversial Princeton Engineering Anomalies Research Lab (PEAR).

Nelson began using random event generator (REG) technology in the field to study effects of special states of group consciousness.

In an extension of the laboratory research utilizing hardware Random Event Generators (REG) called FieldREG, investigators examined the outputs of REGs in the field before, during and after highly focused or coherent group events. The group events studied included psychotherapy sessions, theater presentations, religious rituals, sports competitions such as the Football World Cup, and television broadcasts such as the Academy Awards.

FieldREG was extended to global dimensions in studies looking at data from 12 independent REGs in the US and Europe during a web-promoted "Gaiamind Meditation" in January 1997, and then again in September 1997 after the death of Diana, Princess of Wales. The project claimed the results suggested it would be worthwhile to build a permanent network of continuously-running REGs. This became the EGG project or Global Consciousness Project.

Comparing the GCP to PEAR, Nelson, referring to the "field" studies with REGs done by PEAR, said the GCP used "exactly the same procedure... applied on a broader scale."

== Methodology ==
The GCP's methodology is based on the hypothesis that events which elicit widespread emotion or draw the simultaneous attention of large numbers of people may affect the output of hardware random number generators in a statistically significant way. The GCP maintains a network of hardware random number generators which are interfaced to computers at 70 locations around the world. Custom software reads the output of the random number generators and records a trial (sum of 200 bits) once every second. The data are sent to a server in Princeton, creating a database of synchronized parallel sequences of random numbers. The GCP is run as a replication experiment, essentially combining the results of many distinct tests of the hypothesis. The hypothesis is tested by calculating the extent of data fluctuations at the time of events. The procedure is specified by a three-step experimental protocol. In the first step, the event duration and the calculation algorithm are pre-specified and entered into a formal registry. In the second step, the event data are extracted from the database and a Z score, which indicates the degree of deviation from the null hypothesis, is calculated from the pre-specified algorithm. In the third step, the event Z-score is combined with the Z-scores from previous events to yield an overall result for the experiment.

The remote devices have been dubbed Princeton Eggs, a reference to the coinage electrogaiagram (EGG), a portmanteau of electroencephalogram and Gaia. Supporters and skeptics have referred to the aim of the GCP as being analogous to detecting "a great disturbance in the Force."

== Claims and criticism of effects from the September 11 terrorist attacks ==
The GCP has suggested that changes in the level of randomness may have occurred during the September 11, 2001 attacks when the planes first impacted, as well as in the two days following the attacks.

Independent scientists Edwin May and James Spottiswoode conducted an analysis of the data around the September 11 attacks and concluded there was no statistically significant change in the randomness of the GCP data during the attacks and the apparent significant deviation reported by Nelson and Radin existed only in their chosen time window. Spikes and fluctuations are to be expected in any random distribution of data, and there is no set time frame for how close a spike has to be to a given event for the GCP to say they have found a correlation. Wolcotte Smith said "A couple of additional statistical adjustments would have to be made to determine if there really was a spike in the numbers," referencing the data related to September 11, 2001. Similarly, Jeffrey D. Scargle believes unless both Bayesian and classical p-value analysis agree and both show the same anomalous effects, the kind of result GCP proposes will not be generally accepted.

In 2003, a New York Times article concluded "All things considered at this point, the stock market seems a more reliable gauge of the national—if not the global—emotional resonance."

In 2007, The Age reported that "[Nelson] concedes the data, so far, is not solid enough for global consciousness to be said to exist at all. It is not possible, for example, to look at the data and predict with any accuracy what (if anything) the eggs may be responding to."

Robert Matthews said that while it was "the most sophisticated attempt yet" to prove psychokinesis existed, the unreliability of significant events to cause statistically significant spikes meant that "the only conclusion to emerge from the Global Consciousness Project so far is that data without a theory is as meaningless as words without a narrative".

In 2017, former project analyst Peter Bancel reviewed the data and found that the result did not support global consciousness, and was instead "consistent with goal-oriented psi," rather than methodological error.

== Roger D. Nelson ==
Roger D. Nelson is an American parapsychologist and researcher and the director of the GCP. From 1980 to 2002, he was Coordinator of Research at the Princeton Engineering Anomalies Research (PEAR) laboratory at Princeton University. His professional focus was the study of consciousness and intention and the role of the mind in the physical world. His work integrates science and spirituality, including research that is directly focused on numinous communal experiences.

Nelson's professional degrees are in experimental cognitive psychology. Until his retirement in 2002, he served as the coordinator of experimental work in the Princeton Engineering Anomalies Research Lab (PEAR), directed by Robert Jahn in the department of Mechanical and Aerospace Engineering, School of Engineering/Applied Science, Princeton University.

== See also ==
- Collective unconscious
- Simulation hypothesis
- Web Bot, a project to predict events using the 'collective unconsciousness' on the Internet.
