= John Edgar Coover =

American psychologist (1872–1938)

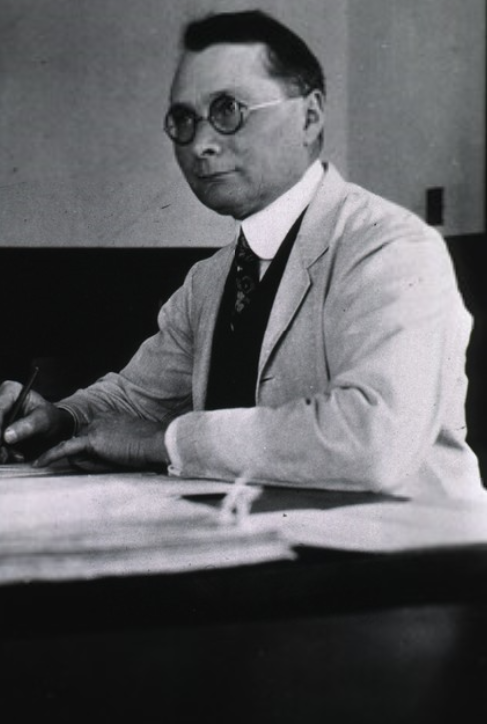
- Occupation(s): Psychologist, parapsychologist

John Edgar Coover (March 16, 1872 – February 19, 1938), also known as J. E. Coover was an American psychologist and parapsychologist known for his experiments into extrasensory perception.

== Career ==
Coover carried out a psychical research programme at Stanford University (1912-1917). He conducted approximately 10, 000 experiments with 100 subjects to test for extrasensory perception (ESP). He concluded after four years of research that "statistical treatments of the data fail to reveal any cause beyond chance". He also conducted 1,000 experiments with psychics and it was revealed that they had no advantage of any supposed psychic ability over normal subjects.

His book Experiments in Psychical Research (1917) was well received by the scientific community for its methodology, rigorous statistics and use of experimental controls. It was considered a debunking work of psychical research by the psychologist Edward B. Titchener.

Coover had criticized the "metapsychism" of parapsychologists as it did adhere to the scientific method. He was highly critical of mediumship which he considered the result of credulity and deception. This led to a dispute with Thomas Welton Stanford a wealthy spiritualist and brother of the university's founder, who had helped fund the psychical research programme at Stanford. Thomas Stanford had endorsed the fraudulent medium Charles Bailey as genuine and requested for Coover to test the medium. However, Coover held strong doubts about Bailey and noted he been exposed as a fraud several times, most notably by the Society for Psychical Research.

== Aftermath ==
Although Coover attributed his results to nothing beyond chance, other parapsychologists such as Robert H. Thouless claimed that when certain data from his experiment was lumped together, it revealed evidence of a small psychic effect. This was denied by Coover who suggested there may have been recording errors on the part of the experimenter.

== Publications ==
- Formal Discipline From the Standpoint of Experimental Psychology (1916)
- Experiments in Psychical Research at Leland Stanford Junior University (Stanford University Press, 1917).
