= Journal of Parapsychology =

- Discipline: Parapsychology
- Language: English
- Edited by: John G. Kruth

Publication details
- History: 1937–present
- Publisher: Rhine Research Center
- Frequency: Biannually

Standard abbreviations
- ISO 4: J. Parapsychol.

Indexing
- ISSN: 0022-3387
- LCCN: 40012649
- OCLC no.: 01588544

Links
- Journal homepage

The Journal of Parapsychology is a biannual peer-reviewed academic journal covering research on psi phenomena, including telepathy, clairvoyance, precognition, and psychokinesis, as well as human consciousness in general and anomalous experiences.

It was established in April 1937 by Joseph Banks Rhine while at Duke University. It is published by the Rhine Research Center, and the current editor-in-chief is Sally Ann Drucker of the same institution. The journal is abstracted and indexed in PsycINFO. It publishes research reports, theoretical discussions, book reviews, and correspondences, as well as the abstracts of papers presented at the Parapsychological Association's annual meeting.

According to Anomalistic Psychology, authored by Chris French and colleagues, it is "widely recognized as the highest quality journal within the field." However, parapsychology has been criticized as a pseudoscience, and most mainstream scientists reject it.

== See also ==
- Journal of the American Society for Psychical Research
- Journal of Near-Death Studies
- Journal of Consciousness Studies
- Journal of Scientific Exploration
- Parapsychology
