= Erlendur Haraldsson =

Icelandic parapsychologist

- Education: University of Iceland; University of Edinburgh; University of Freiburg
- Alma mater: LMU Munich
- Scientific career
- Fields: Psychology
- Workplaces: University of Iceland
- Doctoral advisor: Hans Bender

Erlendur Haraldsson (3 November 1931 – 22 November 2020) was a professor emeritus of psychology on the faculty of social science at the University of Iceland. He published in various psychology and psychiatry journals. In addition, he published parapsychology books and authored a number of papers for parapsychology journals.

== Education ==
Erlendur studied philosophy at the University of Iceland, the University of Edinburgh, and the University of Freiburg from 1954 to 1958 and supported himself as a writer and journalist from 1959 to 1963. He studied psychology at Freiburg and at LMU Munich, where he obtained a Dipl. Psych. degree in 1969. He was a research fellow at the Institute of Parapsychology in Durham, N. C., from 1969 to 1970, and did an internship in clinical psychology at the Department of Psychiatry, University of Virginia in Charlottesville, from 1970 to 1971. He received his Ph.D. in psychology from the University of Freiburg under parapsychologist Hans Bender in 1972.

== Teaching and research career ==
Erlendur worked as a research associate at the American Society for Psychical Research from 1972 to 1974. In 1973, he became a faculty member at the University of Iceland, where he advanced to professor of psychology in 1989. He retired from teaching in 1999. He conducted surveys of religious and folk beliefs; for example in a survey of randomly selected Icelanders conducted from 1974 until 1975, and published in 1977 and 1978, he established that an unusually high proportion believe in the paranormal, in particular in supernatural figures such as huldufólk and draugar, research built on in the 2000s by Terry Gunnell; in a 1978 survey he examined the prevalence of belief in Iceland in precognitive dreams; and in a study published in 1985 he found proportionally more reports of encounters with dead people from Iceland than any other European country. He has also contributed to the cross-cultural standardization of psychological testing instruments.

In addition, from 1982 to 83, he worked with Ian Stevenson at the University of Virginia on reincarnation research. He spent a year with J. B. Rhine in Durham, North Carolina. He has coauthored studies of the personality, abilities and psychological characteristics of children who claim memories of a previous life in Sri Lanka, comparing them with paired children who did not claim such memories.

Erlendur received the Outstanding Career Award from the Parapsychological Association and the Myers Memorial Award from the Society for Psychical Research. His 2005 book Látnir í heimi lifenda (English translation The Departed Among the Living, 2012) describes surveys and follow-up investigations he conducted into alleged apparitions and related phenomena in Iceland.

=== Deathbed phenomena ===
In 1971, Erlendur coauthored with Karlis Osis the book At the Hour of Death, describing research into deathbed visions in the United States and India that they interpreted as more consistent with the hypothesis of a transition experience than with the "extinction hypothesis". Their data collection methods drew criticism from the scientific community. According to Terence Hines:

Osis and Haraldsson's (1977) study was based on replies received from ten thousand questionnaires sent to doctors and nurses in the United States and India. Only 6.4 percent were returned. Since it was the doctors and nurses who were giving the reports, not the patients who had, presumably, actually had the experience, the reports were secondhand. This means they had passed through two highly fallible and constructive human memory systems (the doctor's or nurse's and the actual patient's) before reaching Osis and Haraldsson.

The psychologist James Alcock criticized the study as it was anecdotal and described their results as "unreliable and uninterpretable." Paul Kurtz also criticized the study, saying all the data was second-hand and influenced by cultural expectations.

=== Sathya Sai Baba ===
Erlendur with Karlis Osis investigated the alleged miracles and paranormal powers of Sathya Sai Baba in the 1980s. He wrote the book Miracles Are My Visiting Cards (1988), also published as Modern Miracles (1997) and republished in 2013 as Modern Miracles: The Story of Sathya Sai Baba: A Modern Day Prophet which documented his investigation and research. The book has been described as a "generally sympathetic treatment of Sai Baba".

In the late 1980s the philosopher of religion David C. Lane wrote that Erlendur's book Modern Miracles "approaches the alleged miracles of Sai Baba with a critical, but open outlook" and recommended it as "the most balanced book ever written" on the subject. Sathya Sai Baba refused to submit to testing in a controlled environment, so Erlendur instead interviewed witnesses. Nevertheless, he debunked some of his alleged miracles, such as the resurrection of Walter Cowan.

Philosopher Paul Edwards noted how Erlendur did not come to any definite conclusion about the authenticity of Baba's miracles but regarded fraud as unlikely. Psychologist Janak Pandey wrote that Erlendur was impressed by Baba but could not get him to produce any paranormal phenomena under controlled conditions.

The parapsychologist Martin Johnson claimed Erlendur had published some "remarkably naïve eyewitness-accounts of the Indian saint's feats" and was surprised Erlendur was taking the possibility that Baba was not a fraud. Daniel Bassuk, professor of religious studies at the University of South Florida wrote "Haraldsson and Osis conclude that they were unable to detect any evidence of fraud, and were led to regard Satya Sai Baba's materializations as 'possibly paranormal'."

The Indian skeptic Basava Premanand criticized the book as a collection of anecdotes rather than an objective scientific report, and the humanist Babu Gogineni found it credulous, saying Erlendur was "more predisposed to believe than to investigate", concluding: "The only lesson one can learn from Erlendur Haraldsson is how not to study the paranormal events."

== Retirement ==
Since his retirement, Erlendur continued to conduct research and publish articles. In 2007, he brought about the establishment of an endowment at the University of Iceland to support research "into paranormal phenomena and alleged psychic experiences in the spirit of the research [he] conducted during his career". In 2012 with Hafliði Helgason, he published a memoir, Á vit hins ókunna, in which he discussed the results of his interviews with children who believe they recall past lives. He was a frequent speaker at professional meetings, such as the convention of the American Psychological Association in Orlando, Florida, in 2012. Moreover, he gave several talks at the Institute for Frontier Areas of Psychology and Mental Health (IGPP), Freiburg i.Br., Germany, and -- over the years quite a number of them -- at the Austrian Society for Parapsychology and Frontier Areas of Science, Vienna.

== Books ==
- Með uppreisnarmönnum í Kúrdistan (in Icelandic). Hafnarfjörður: Skuggsjá. 1964. OCLC 63214083.
- Osis, Karlis; — (1977). At the Hour of Death. New York: Avon. ISBN 978-0-380-01802-4.
- "Miracles Are My visiting cards": An Investigative Report on the Psychic Phenomena Associated with Sathya Sai Baba. London: Century Books. 1987. ISBN 978-0-7126-1514-3.
- —; Grof, Stanislav; Fenwick, Peter; Grosso, Michael; Tart, T. Charles; Woolger, Roger (2003). Wir wissen mehr als unser Gehirn. Die Grenzen des Bewusstseins überschreiten [Thinking Beyond the Brain] (in German). Freiburg: Herder. ISBN 978-3-451-05284-2.
- Látnir í heimi lifenda: Niðurstöður Rannsóknar um reynslu íslendinga af látnu fólki (in Icelandic). Reykjavík: Háskólaútgáfan (University Press). 2005. ISBN 978-9979-54-662-7.
- The Departed Among the Living. An Investigative Study of Afterlife Encounters (Translated ed.). Guildford: White Crow Books. 2012. ISBN 978-1-908733-29-0.

== Further information ==
=== Documentaries ===
- Past Lives: Stories of Reincarnation. Storyhouse Productions, Washington D. C. Producer Andreas Gutzeit. Broadcast in the United States on April 1, 2003 on The Learning Channel (Discovery Communications). Aired on Discovery International on December 29, 2003.
- Reinkarnation – nur ein Mythos? Storyhouse Productions for Learning Channel and Spiegel TV. Spiegel TV in VOX and XXP, October 2002. (German version of Past Lives: Stories of Reincarnation.). A Tamil version was broadcast in Asia.
- Children's Past Lives. A Zenith North Production for Channel Four, UK. Producer Laura Granditer. October 2000.
- In Search of the Dead. BBC Wales in cooperation with PBS, WXXI-T Rochester, New York. Producer Jeffrey Ieverson. 1992.
- Með Kúrdum í Irak (With Kurds in Iraq). Icelandic State Television. January 1967.

=== Books ===
- Hafliði Helgason. Á vit hins ókunna: endurminningar Erlendar Haraldssonar. Reykjavík: Almenna bókafélagið, 2012. ISBN 978-9935-426-40-6. (in Icelandic)
- "Frá útrásarvíkingi í dulsálarfræði - 'Hrifinn af fólki sem heldur sínu striki' - Ný bók" (in Icelandic). Pressan.is. 6 October 2011. Archived from the original on 10 May 2015.
