= Alec Gallimore =

American aerospace engineer

Alec D. Gallimore

Provost of Duke University
- Incumbent
- Assumed office July 1, 2023
- Preceded by: Jennifer Francis

15th Dean of the College of Engineering of the University of Michigan
- In office 2016–2023

Personal details
- Education: Rensselaer Polytechnic Institute (BS); Princeton University (MA, PhD)
- Scientific career
- Fields: Aerospace materials Fluid dynamics
- Thesis: Anode power deposition in coaxial MPD thrusters (1992)
- Doctoral advisor: Robert G. Jahn

Alec Damian Gallimore is an American aerospace engineer, currently serving as provost of Duke University since July 2023. Previously at the University of Michigan College of Engineering, he served as the 15th dean of engineering from 2016 to 2023 and as a faculty member since 1992.

== Early life and education ==
Gallimore was born in Washington, D.C., to Jamaican immigrant parents Kathleen and Lascelles Gallimore. He was raised in Harrington Park, New Jersey, United States.

Gallimore received a Bachelor of Science with a major in aeronautical engineering from Rensselaer Polytechnic Institute in 1986. He received a Master of Arts in 1988 and a Doctor of Philosophy in 1992, both in aerospace engineering and from Princeton University. His doctoral dissertation was on aerospace materials and fluid dynamics, titled Anode power deposition in coaxial MPD thrusters (1992).

== Career ==
Following his undergraduate degree, Gallimore was one of forty engineering and science college students selected to participate in a summer program at the NASA Lewis Research Center. Following his PhD, Gallimore intended on pursuing a career with NASA but was informed he needed more experience. As a result, he chose to join the faculty at the University of Michigan College of Engineering to improve his public speaking. Upon joining the faculty, Gallimore founded the Plasmadynamics and Electric Propulsion Laboratory. He originally intended to return to NASA after five years of teaching but chose to pursue a career in academia instead. From 2005 to 2011, Gallimore served as an associate dean at the Horace H. Rackham School of Graduate Studies and from 2011 to 2013 he was the associate dean for research and graduate education.

As founding director of the Plasmadynamics and Electric Propulsion Laboratory (PEPL), Gallimore focused his research on electric propulsion, plasma diagnostics, space plasma simulation, electrode physics, nano-particle energetics, and hypersonic aerodynamics’ interaction with plasma. The PEPL was originally interested in improving and enhancing the Large Vacuum Test Facility (LVTF), a 20 by 30-foot vacuum chamber, and a small standalone vacuum antechamber. In 2015, the laboratory designed an X3 Nested-Channel Hall Thruster to be used in NASA's Next Space Technologies for Exploration Partnerships (NextSTEP).

Beyond his efforts in the PEPL, Gallimore served as director for the NASA Michigan Space Grant Consortium and for the Michigan/Air Force Center of Excellence in Electric Propulsion. In February 2016, Gallimore was named the next Robert J. Vlasic Dean of Engineering from July 1, 2016, through June 30, 2021. While serving in this role, he was elected to the National Academy of Engineering for "advanced spacecraft electric propulsion, especially Hall thruster technology." In 2020, Gallimore was presented with the American Institute of Aeronautics and Astronautics Wyld Propulsion Award for his "groundbreaking achievements and leadership in technology and workforce development that have contributed significantly to increased utilization of spacecraft electric propulsion systems."

On March 24, 2023, it was announced Gallimore would become Provost of Duke University. In his capacity of provost, Gallimore is ex officio chair of the Duke Kunshan University board of trustees.
