= Nostradamus Effect =

American television series

- Genre: Sensationalism; Apocalypticism; Religion; Paranormal
- Narrated by: Phil Crowley
- Theme music composer: Scott Cruz
- Country of origin: United States
- Original language: English
- No. of seasons: 1
- No. of episodes: 12

Production
- Running time: 45 minutes
- Production company: Workaholic Productions

Original release
- Network: History Channel
- Release: September 9 – December 16, 2009

Nostradamus Effect is an American television series that premiered on September 9, 2009, on the History Channel. The program detailed various historical apocalyptic prophecies, such as the 2012 phenomenon. The show was named after reputed French seer Michel de Nostredame, more commonly known as Nostradamus. The series ran for a single season.

It presented itself in a "documentary style" but it was not a documentary. The show's disclaimer stated that it does not take sides regarding the apocalyptic prophecies. In the introduction of each episode, the narrator states, "We will neither refute, nor endorse, these theories; merely, present the evidence." Despite this claim, prophecies are often exaggerated or presented incorrectly. For example, the show repeatedly claims that the Mayan Long Count calendar predicts the end of the world for December 21, 2012 while in reality it marks the first day of the 14th b'ak'tun era and not any belief in the end of the world.

The series was described as full of misleading suggestions supported by vague, unattributed weasel phrases such as "some think that", "many believe that", and "scholars suggest that", while in his book 2012: It's Not the End of the World Nostradamus specialist Peter Lemesurier describes its Nostradamian aspects as "largely fiction" and "lurid nonsense".

The series was also released on DVD in 2010.

== Episodes ==
No.	Title	Original release date
1	"The Third Anti-Christ?"	September 9, 2009
Examines prophecies from Nostradamus that reportedly predict three evil dictators that are referred to as anti-christs. The first is widely asserted (though not by reputable Nostradamus scholars such as those listed in Wikipedia's article on the seer) to be Napoleon, the second Hitler, and the third is unknown.
2	"Da Vinci's Armageddon"	September 16, 2009
Examines claims that the paintings, sketches, and writings of Leonardo da Vinci may predict a great apocalyptic flood, even though the sketches are of the biblical Flood and the writings are merely a humorous exercise in making everyday processes seem 'apocalyptic'.
3	"Extinction 2012"	September 23, 2009
Examines prophecies about December 21, 2012 allegedly based on doomsday scenarios from Mayan, Chinese, Hopi, and Hindu sources, in addition to Terence McKenna's Timewave Zero theory, and Web Bot predictions.
4	"Hitler's Blood Oath"	September 30, 2009
Links between Hitler and prophecies, including Nostradamus, Erik Jan Hanussen, and the roles the occult had in the creation of the Third Reich.
5	"The Apocalypse Code"	October 7, 2009
Isaac Newton's conclusions about the date of the end of the world, based on his personal analysis of the Bible's books of Daniel and Revelation.
6	"Son of Nostradamus"	October 14, 2009
Investigating reports that Nostradamus's son, Cesar, may be the actual author of what the History Channel calls a 'lost book' of prophecies discovered in 1994.
7	"Secrets of the Seven Seals"	October 21, 2009
The Book of Revelation from the New Testament, and the breaking of the Seven seals.
8	"Fatima's Lost Prophecy"	November 4, 2009
Investigating the Three Secrets of Fatima.
9	"Satan's Army"	November 11, 2009
Investigating John the Apostle's visions of Satan's final war.
10	"Doomsday Hieroglyphs"	December 2, 2009
Investigates the Giza Plateau of Egypt in connection with the eschaton, and in particular the Great Pyramid (notwithstanding the fact that, according to Lemesurier's The Great Pyramid Decoded (inter alia) it contains only one or two rough, painted, workmen's hieroglyphs in its topmost chamber, plus some carved hieroglyphs at its entrance that were carved by a 19th-century German expedition).
11	"Armageddon Battle Plan"	December 9, 2009
Asserts that the War Scroll discovered among the Dead Sea Scrolls contains prophecies that are being fulfilled today and that the War Scroll's prediction of an armageddon could be true.
12	"Rapture"	December 16, 2009
Considers the Christian doctrine, The Rapture, to be true and investigates what it considers to be signs and warnings of the truth and veracity of the Rapture doctrine, which seems to have first arisen in the 17th or 19th century.
