= Web Bot =

Computer program that is supposedly clairvoyant

Web Bot is an internet bot computer program whose developers claim is able to predict future events by tracking keywords entered on the internet. It was developed in 1997, originally to predict trends of companies' shares publicly listed. The creator of the Web Bot Project, Clif High, along with his associate George Ure, keep the technology and algorithms largely secret and sell the predictions via the website.

== Methodology ==
Internet bots monitor news articles, blogs, forums, and other forms of Internet chatter. Words in the lexicon are assigned numeric values for emotional quantifiers such as duration, impact, immediacy, intensity, and others. The lexicon is dynamic, and changes according to shifts in emotional tension, and how humans communicate those changes using the Internet. As of 2008, there were about 300,000 keywords in the lexicon, along with emotional context, which are fed into a computer-generated modelspace.

The operators of Web Bot interpret the bot's results and make a report called the "ALTA report" available on their website to paying subscribers. ALTA stands for "asymmetric language trend analysis". Many believe the predictions are pseudoscientific and too vague to be meaningful. Despite this, the creators have made many claims after the fact that their reports have predicted important events.

== Predictions ==
=== Claimed hits ===
- Northeast Blackout of 2003
- 2004 Indian Ocean earthquake
- Hurricane Katrina and its devastation

=== Misses ===
- The Web Bot gained most of its notoriety for contributing to the 2012 phenomenon by predicting a cataclysm that would devastate the planet on 21 December 2012, possibly a reversing of Earth's magnetic poles or a small series of nuclear attacks leading up to a major attack during the year. The prediction did not call for a complete end of the world.
- Web Bot predicted that a massive earthquake would occur in December 2008 in Vancouver, British Columbia, Canada and the Pacific Northwest, but no such event happened.
- A prediction that the US dollar would completely collapse in 2011, and that Israel would bomb Iran, with the administration of U.S. President Barack Obama being thrown into major chaos.

== Reception ==
The History Channel has discussed Web Bot in its special "Doomsday 2012: The End of Days" on season 3 of Decoding The Past and on other shows that feature predictions about the end of the world, such as the Nostradamus Effect. A The Globe and Mail journalist noted that:

What interests me more than the bot's accuracy (of which I'm skeptical), is the relentless negativity of its projections. According to the bot, the future is always bleak and steadily worsening.

Tom Chivers in the Daily Telegraph notes three criticisms of the project:

...the internet might plausibly reveal group knowledge about the stock market or, conceivably, terror attacks [but] it would be no more capable of predicting a natural disaster than would a Google search, ... the predictions are so vague as to be meaningless, [and] the prophecies become self-distorting.

== See also ==
- Global Consciousness Project
- Google Flu Trends
- Google Trends
- Predictive analytics
