= R. A. McConnell =

American physicist (1914–2006)

Robert A. McConnell (1914–2006) was an American physicist and parapsychologist.

McConnell was born in Pennsylvania in 1914, and studied at Carnegie Institute of Technology obtaining a B.S. in physics in 1935 and a Ph.D. from the University of Pittsburgh in 1947. He worked as a physicist at a U.S. Naval aircraft factory and at the Massachusetts Institute of Technology Radiation Laboratory. He also worked in radar moving target indication, iconoscope, and ultrasonic microwaves.

He earned a Doctor of Philosophy degree in engineering physics. McConnell was the first president of the Parapsychological Association and a Fellow of the American Psychological Society. He was Research Professor Emeritus of Biological Sciences at the University of Pittsburgh.

== Selected works ==
- Encounters with Parapsychology (1982, ISBN 0-9610232-1-X)
- Parapsychology and Self-Deception in Science (1983, ISBN 0-9610232-2-8)
- An Introduction to Parapsychology in the Context of Science (1983, ISBN 0-9610232-3-6)
- Parapsychology in Retrospect (1987, ISBN 0-9610232-4-4)
- Far Out in the New Age: The Subversion of Science by Cultural Communism (1995, ISBN 0-9610232-6-0)
- Joyride To Infinity: A Scientific Study of the Doomsday Literature (2000, ISBN 1-878465-35-X)
- God.org Are You There?: On the Deeper Meaning of ESP (2001, ISBN 0-9610232-8-7)
- Can We Win This War?: ISLAM (2002, ISBN 0-9610232-9-5)
