= Nonequilibrium Gas and Plasma Dynamics Laboratory =

The Nonequilibrium Gas and Plasma Dynamics Laboratory (NGPDL) at the Aerospace Engineering Department of the University of Colorado Boulder is headed by Professor Iain D. Boyd and performs research of nonequilibrium gases and plasmas involving the development of physical models for various gas systems of interest, numerical algorithms on the latest supercomputers, and the application of challenging flows for several exciting projects. The lab places a great deal of emphasis on comparison of simulation with external experimental and theoretical results, having ongoing collaborative studies with colleagues at the University of Michigan such as the Plasmadynamics and Electric Propulsion Laboratory, other universities, and government laboratories such as NASA, United States Air Force Research Laboratory, and the United States Department of Defense.

Current research areas of the NGPDL include electric propulsion, hypersonic aerothermodynamics, flows involving very small length scales (MEMS devices), and materials processing (jets used in deposition thin films for advanced materials). Due to nonequilibrium effects, these flows cannot always be computed accurately with the macroscopic equations of gas dynamics and plasma physics. Instead, the lab has adopted a microscopic approach in which the atoms/molecules in a gas and the ions/electrons in a plasma are simulated on computationally using a large number of model particles within sophisticated Monte Carlo methods. The lab has developed a general 2D/axi-symmetric/3D code, MONACO, for simulating nonequilibrium neutral flows that can run either on scalar workstations or in a parallel computing environment.

The lab also has developed a general 2D/axi-symmetric/3D code, LeMANS, to numerically solve the Navier-Stokes equations using computational fluid dynamics when the Knudsen number is sufficiently small. This allows lab members to explore flows that would otherwise be too computationally expensive with a particle method. Work is currently being done to combine the two codes into a hybrid that uses MONACO when the flow is in the collisional nonequilibrium regime and LeMANS when the flow can be considered continuous.

Current and past plasma and nonequilibrium flow projects include simulation of ion thrusters, Hall effect thrusters, and pulsed plasma thrusters) as well as numerous NASA contracts to study reentry aerothermodynamics for space vehicles, including the Crew Exploration Vehicle. Other plasma research includes modeling wall ablation from directed energy weapons and the plasma-propellant interaction in electrothermal chemical guns.

== Official website ==
https://www.colorado.edu/lab/ngpdl/
