= Plasmadynamics and Electric Propulsion Laboratory =

American space research laboratory

Plasmadynamics and Electric Propulsion Laboratory (PEPL) is a University of Michigan laboratory facility for electric propulsion and plasma application research. The primary goals of PEPL are to increase efficiency of electric propulsion systems, understand integration issues of plasma thrusters with spacecraft, and to identify non-propulsion applications of electric propulsion technology. It was founded by Professor Alec D. Gallimore and is currently directed by Professor Benjamin A. Jorns.

PEPL currently houses the Large Vacuum Test Facility (LVTF). The chamber was constructed in the 1960s by Bendix Corporation for testing of the Apollo Lunar Roving Vehicle and was later donated to the University of Michigan in 1982. The cylindrical 9 m long by 6 m diameter long stainless-steel clad tank is utilized for Hall effect thruster, electrostatic ion thruster, magnetoplasmadynamic thruster, and arcjet testing as well as space tether and plasma diagnostics research.

== See also ==
- Nonequilibrium Gas and Plasma Dynamics Group
