= Charles R. Tolbert =

American astronomer and astronomy educator (1936–2025)

Charles Ray Tolbert
- Born: Charles Ray Tolbert; November 14, 1936; Van, West Virginia, U.S.
- Died: December 4, 2025 (aged 89); Charlottesville, Virginia, U.S.
- Education: University of Richmond (B.S., 1958); Vanderbilt University (M.S., 1960; Ph.D., 1963)
- Known for: Undergraduate astronomy education; Society for Scientific Exploration (President); American Astronomical Society (Education Officer)
- Spouse: Carla Tolbert (m. 1965)
- Children: 3
- Awards: Richard H. Emmons Award (2013); Fellow of the AAAS; Raven Society; Phi Beta Kappa; Sigma Xi
- Scientific career
- Fields: Optical astronomy; Radio astronomy; Astronomy education
- Workplaces: University of Virginia; University of Groningen (postdoc)
- Thesis: (1963)

Charles Ray Tolbert (November 14, 1936 – December 4, 2025) was an American astronomer and Professor Emeritus at the University of Virginia, known for his contributions to optical astronomy and radio astronomy, his dedication to undergraduate astronomy education, and his leadership in professional scientific organizations.

== Life and education ==
Tolbert was born on November 14, 1936, in Van, West Virginia, and grew up in Richmond, Virginia. He attended Fox Elementary, Binford Junior High, and Thomas Jefferson High School in Richmond. He earned a Bachelor of Science in physics from the University of Richmond in 1958. His interest in astronomy began as an undergraduate when he attended an amateur astronomy meeting and saw Saturn through a telescope for the first time. He then attended Vanderbilt University, where he received a Master of Science in 1960 and a Ph.D. in physics-astronomy in 1963.

Following his doctorate, he completed a postdoctoral fellowship at the University of Groningen in the Netherlands, where he met his future wife, Carla. They were married for 59 years and had three daughters: Juliette, Nicolette, and Michelle. He died on December 4, 2025, in Charlottesville, Virginia.

== Career ==
Tolbert joined the faculty of the University of Virginia's Department of Astronomy in 1969, beginning with a small classes of about 25 students. He specialized in both optical and radio astronomy. Over a 40-year teaching career, he became widely recognized for his introductory astronomy courses "The Sky and Solar System" and "Stars and Galaxies", which he taught to an estimated 30,000 students. He retired in 2010 and was named Professor Emeritus.

For eight years, Tolbert served as the university's Director of the Office of Academic Space. From 2000 to 2009, he served as Grand Marshal of the university's graduation ceremony on the Lawn.

=== Professional service ===
Tolbert was active in numerous professional organizations. He served for six years as Education Officer of the American Astronomical Society (AAS). He also served as chair of the Committee on Physics Education for the American Institute of Physics, and as a member of the American Institute of Physics Programs Policy Committee. He was a member of the International Astronomical Union (IAU), serving on its Commission on Astronomy Education and Commission on the Exchange of Astronomers. He was elected a Fellow of the American Association for the Advancement of Science (AAAS) and was a member of Phi Beta Kappa, Sigma Xi, and the Raven Society.

Tolbert was a founding member of the Society for Scientific Exploration (SSE), having been recruited by Peter Sturrock in 1981.. He served as the society's treasurer for nine years and as its president for six years. He was quoted in a 2005 Time article on the SSE, and the society and his role in it were discussed in Virginia Magazine in 2006

In the 1980s, Tolbert served for eight years on the Albemarle County School Board, including two years as chair, and served six years with the Piedmont Regional Educational Program, including two years as chair.

== Views on science and pseudoscience ==
Tolbert was an outspoken critic of astrology, which he held in open contempt and regularly debunked in his lectures, drawing a sharp distinction between astronomy and pseudoscience for his students. However, at the same time, he maintained that anomalous or unconventional scientific claims deserved rigorous, open-minded investigation rather than dismissal. He attributed this outlook to what he called the "Jeffersonian ideal" of being willing to examine any idea so long as it remained open to refutation. As president of the SSE, he acknowledged that the society received submissions of varying quality, but argued that credentialed researchers applying scientific method to unexplained phenomena should have a legitimate venue in which to publish and be scrutinized. He emphasized that today's fringe inquiry could, through proper evaluation, yield future understanding, and that the role of the scientist was to test claims rather than foreclose on them.

== Awards ==
In 2013, Tolbert received the Richard H. Emmons Award for Excellence in College Astronomy Teaching from the Astronomical Society of the Pacific. He was nominated for the award by colleagues John Hawley and Roger Chevalier, and by his former teaching assistant Phil Plait, the astronomer and author of the "Bad Astronomy" blog.
