= Karlis Osis =

Latvian parapsychologist

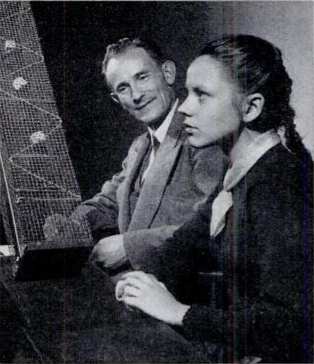
- Karlis Osis testing his stepdaughter in a psychokinesis experiment.
- Born: Kārlis Osis; December 26, 1917; Riga, Latvia, Russian Empire
- Died: December 26, 1997 (aged 80); Glen Ridge, New Jersey, U.S.
- Scientific career
- Fields: Parapsychology

Karlis Osis (Latvian: Kārlis Osis; 26 December 1917 – 26 December 1997) was a Latvian-born parapsychologist who specialised in exploring deathbed phenomena and life after death.

== Biography ==
Karlis' first research, conducted in the 1940s, was inspired by the work of English physicist and parapsychologist William F. Barrett, specifically his book, Death Bed Visions. In an attempt to build on Barrett's research, he and Erlendur Haraldsson conducted a four-year study whereby they sent out hundreds of questionnaires to doctors and nurses in both the US and northern India, asking them about their observations regarding dying patients.

Their research highlighted differences between cultural experiences near death. They found that a person's religion greatly influenced what was seen and that this was most apparent when observing the differences between Indian and American experience where Indian patients were far more likely to see a personification of death than Americans.

He repeated this experiment again in 1976, this time investigating the effects high fevers, painkillers and diseases which specifically affect the brain, had on a patient's reported experiences at the time of death. Despite the far smaller pool of data (the newer study involved just 877 doctors in the USA alone), Osis concluded to his satisfaction that what he called the "sick brain hypothesis" – that the decrease of brain activity was causally linked to near death experiences – did not stand up to scrutiny.

On being asked about the practical applications of his theories, Osis remarked that "One definite finding of the research is the diminishing fear of death".

In 1957, Osis became the director of the Parapsychology Foundation in New York, being elected as president in 1961. In 1962, he began working with the American Society for Psychical Research, work which continued for many years. In 1971, he and Haraldsson co-authored the book At the Hour of Death, describing the results of their research.

== Alex Tanous ==
In the 1970s Osis conducted many out-of-body experience (OBE) experiments with the psychic Alex Tanous. For a series of these experiments he was asked whilst in an OBE state to try to identify coloured targets that were placed in remote locations. Osis reported that in 197 trials there were 114 hits. However, the controls to the experiments have been criticized and according to Susan Blackmore the final result was not particularly significant, as 108 hits would be expected by chance. Blackmore noted that the results provide "no evidence for accurate perception in the OBE".

In 1980, Osis carried out another experiment with Tanous. He would attempt to leave his body to a shielded chamber to identify a target that contained strain gauges to detect mechanical activity. Osis reported that from the results Tanous had left his body and was present at the target location. This conclusion has been criticized. The baseline activity of the device was not measured and the overall hit rate was not reported by Osis. According to Blackmore when she calculated the hit rate from the data "overall the subject made no more hits than would be expected by chance. This implies that any hits made were likely to have been due to chance and not an OBE. Osis' conclusion therefore seems quite unjustified and the results do not unambiguously support the idea that Alex Tanous was able to influence the strain gauges with his OBE presence."

Osis also conducted experiments with volunteers in a soundproof chamber in an attempt to get them to move a pendulum from a distance. Magician Milbourne Christopher has written that none of Osis' "out-of-the-body experiments can be properly evaluated; complete data about them have never been published." Science writer Mary Roach suggested that Osis was a "deluded or sloppy researcher."

== Reception ==
The method Osis and Haraldsson used to collect data has drawn criticism from the skeptical community. According to Terence Hines:

Osis and Haraldsson's (1977) study was based on replies received from ten thousand questionnaires sent to doctors and nurses in the United States and India. Only 6.4 percent were returned. Since it was the doctors and nurses who were giving the reports, not the patients who had, presumably, actually had the experience, the reports were secondhand. This means they had passed through two highly fallible and constructive human memory systems (the doctor's or nurse's and the actual patient's) before reaching Osis and Haraldsson.

The psychologist James Alcock criticized the study, as it was anecdotal and described their results as "unreliable and unintepretable." Paul Kurtz also criticized the study, saying all of the data were second-hand and influenced by cultural expectations.

== Books ==
- Haraldsson, Erlendur; Osis, Karlis. (2006). At the Hour of Death. Hastings House / Daytrips Publishers; 3RD edition. ISBN 0-8038-9386-8
