= Society for Scientific Exploration =

American body to study fringe science

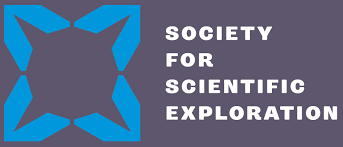
- SSE
- Abbreviation: SSE
- Founded: 1982; 44 years ago
- Founder: Peter A. Sturrock
- Type: Alternative medicine and fringe science publishing group
- Legal status: active
- Purpose: To provide a critical forum for sharing original research into conventional and unconventional topics
- Location(s): Society for Scientific Exploration 12 Candlewood Drive, Petaluma, California, US
- Website: www.scientificexploration.org

The Society for Scientific Exploration (SSE) is a group committed to studying fringe science. The opinions of the organization in regard to what are the proper limits of scientific exploration are often at odds with those of mainstream science. Critics argue that the SSE is devoted to disreputable ideas far outside the scientific mainstream.

== History ==
The society was founded in 1982. Its first meeting took place at the University of Maryland, College Park in 1982.

Of the SSE and its journal, Michael Lemonick said that "Pretty much anything that might have shown up on The X-Files or in the National Enquirer shows up first here. But what also shows up is a surprising attitude of skepticism."

== Activities ==
=== Journal ===
Journal of Scientific Exploration
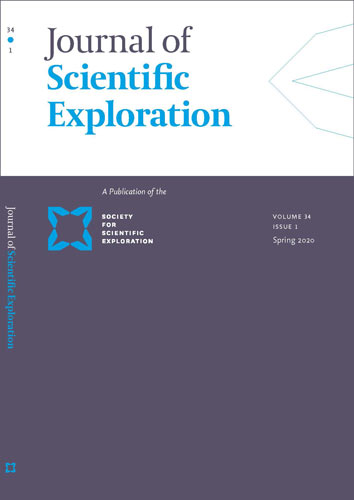
- Discipline: Interdisciplinary
- Language: English
- Edited by: Stephen E. Braude

Publication details
- History: 1987–present
- Publisher: Society for Scientific Exploration (United States)
- Frequency: Quarterly
- Open access: Yes

Standard abbreviations
- ISO 4: J. Sci. Explor.

Indexing
- ISSN: 0892-3310
- OCLC no.: 976504769

Links
- Journal homepage; Online access

The society's scientific journal, the Journal of Scientific Exploration, was established to provide a scientific forum for ufology, parapsychology, and cryptozoology, publishing research articles, essays, book reviews, and letters on those and many other topics that are largely ignored in mainstream journals.

The journal is peer-reviewed and was abstracted and indexed in Scopus.

The journal is edited by Stephen E. Braude.

The Spirituality and Psychiatry Special Interest Group of the Royal College of Psychiatrists says that the journal has reports about anomalies in science, particularly in the parapsychological and extraterrestrial fields. Some academics have noted that the journal publishes on anomalous issues, topics often on the fringe of science.

==== Criticism ====
Kendrick Frazier, editor of Skeptical Inquirer and Committee for Skeptical Inquiry fellow, has suggested that:

The JSE, while presented as neutral and objective, appears to hold a hidden agenda. They seem to be interested in promoting fringe topics as real mysteries and they tend to ignore most evidence to the contrary. They publish "scholarly" articles promoting the reality of dowsing, neo-astrology, ESP, and psychokinesis. Most of the prominent and active members are strong believers in the reality of such phenomena.

Seth Kalichman regards the journal as a publisher of pseudoscience, with the journal serving as a "major outlet for UFOology, paranormal activity, extrasensory powers, alien abductions etc".

Philosopher of science Noretta Koertge described the journal as an "attempt to institutionalize pseudoscience".

Skeptic Robert Sheaffer writes that the SSE journal has published articles implying that certain topics, like paranormal activities, dowsing and reincarnation, are true and have been verified scientifically. The articles, often written in impressive jargon by scientists with impressive academic credentials, try to convince other scientists that further research into those topics is warranted; but, Sheaffer argues, those articles failed to convince the mainstream scientific community.

=== Annual meeting ===
The SSE holds an annual meeting in the US every spring and periodic meetings in Europe. In the US meeting in 2005, around a hundred researchers came to hear talks on, as journalist Michael Lemonick writes, "among other things, consciousness physics, astrology and parapsychology ... [M]any of the scientists here are on the faculty at major universities, and were doing fine at conventional research. But sometimes that gets boring."

According to experimental psychologist Roger D. Nelson, head of the Global Consciousness Project, the SSE aims to "give everyone a respectful hearing. If we think a speaker is doing bad science, we consider it our duty to criticize it. We get our share of lunatics, but they don't hang around long."

=== 1998 UFO panel ===
On June 19, 1998 it was reported that "an international panel of scientists" was convened to conduct "the first independent review of UFO phenomena since 1966", according to the wording used by Associated Press. The Skeptical Inquirer published an article by Robert Sheaffer who wrote that the SSE was a non-mainstream organization that was biased towards uncritically believing UFO phenomena, that the panel included many scientists that were UFO advocates but no scientists that were skeptics of UFO claims, and that all the uphold cases were old cases that had failed to convince any skeptic of its accuracy or veracity. These included the Cash-Landrum incident, the Trans-en-Provence Case and the Aurora, Texas UFO Incident.

== Membership ==
As of 2005:

- the president was Charles Tolbert, an astronomer at the University of Virginia.
- the editor of SSE's journal was Henry Bauer, a dean emeritus at Virginia Tech.

As of 2008, the Leaders Emeritus were Peter A. Sturrock, from the Department of Physics & Department of Applied Physics of Stanford University and Larry Frederick and Charles Tolbert from the Department of Astronomy of University of Virginia.

== Indexing and abstracting ==
The Journal of Scientific Exploration is or has been indexed and abstracted in the following bibliographic databases:

- EBSCO Information Services
- Microsoft Academic
- Naver
- Norwegian Register for Scientific Journals, Series and Publishers, only up to 2008
- Publons
- Scimago
- Scopus, up to 2018 when they discontinued its coverage.
- WorldCat (OCLC)

The journal is also mentioned in the list of open-access journals maintained by DOAJ.
