= Princeton Engineering Anomalies Research Lab =

Research program at Princeton University that studied parapsychology

The Princeton Engineering Anomalies Research (PEAR) was a research program at Princeton University that studied parapsychology. Established in 1979 by then Dean of Engineering Robert G. Jahn, PEAR conducted formal studies on two primary subject areas, psychokinesis (PK) and remote viewing. Owing to the controversial nature of the subject matter, the program had a strained relationship with Princeton and was considered by the administration and some faculty to be an embarrassment to the university. Critics stated that it lacked scientific rigor, used poor methodology, and misused statistics, and characterized it as pseudoscience. PEAR closed in February 2007, being incorporated into the "International Consciousness Research Laboratories (ICRL).

== Parapsychological experiments with random event generators ==
PEAR employed electronic random event generators (REGs) to explore the ability of test subjects to use psychokinesis to influence the random output distribution of these devices to conform to their pre-recorded intentions to produce higher numbers, lower numbers, or nominal baselines. Most of these experiments utilized a microelectronic REG, but experiments were also conducted with "a giant, wall-mounted pachinko-like machine with a cascade of bouncing balls".

In 1986 associates of PEAR published data collected over the course of seven years from a group of subjects attempting to influence random number generators across millions of trials. In all cases, the observed effects were very small (between one and about 0.1%), and although the statistical significance of the results at the P<0.05 level is not generally disputed, detractors point to potential ethical violations and flaws in experiment procedures, as well as questioning the importance of large-sample studies that only marginally clear the p<0.05 significance threshold. The baseline for chance behavior used did not vary as statistically appropriate (baseline bind). Two PEAR researchers attributed this baseline bind to the motivation of the operators to achieve a good baseline and indicates that the random number generator used was not random. It has been noted that a single test subject (presumed to be a member of PEAR's staff) participated in 15% of PEAR's trials, and was responsible for half of the total observed effect.

James Alcock in a review mentioned various problems with the PEAR experiments such as poor controls and documentation with the possibility of fraud, data selection and optional stopping not being ruled out. Alcock concluded there was no reason to believe the results were from paranormal origin.

The psychologist C. E. M. Hansel, who evaluated Jahn's early psychokinesis experiments at the PEAR laboratory, wrote that a satisfactory control series had not been employed, that they had not been independently replicated, and that the reports lacked detail. Hansel noted that "very little information is provided about the design of the experiment, the subjects, or the procedure adopted. Details are not given about the subjects, the times they were tested, or the precise conditions under which they were tested." Physicist professor Milton Rothman has noted that Jahn's experiments at PEAR started from an idealistic assumption, ignored the laws of physics and had no basis in reality.

PEAR's results have been criticized for deficient reproducibility. In one instance two German organizations failed to reproduce PEAR's results, while PEAR similarly failed to reproduce their own results. An attempt by York University's Stan Jeffers also failed to replicate PEAR's results.
