= Parapsychological Association =

Professional society for parapsychologists

The Parapsychological Association (PA) was formed in 1957 as a professional society for parapsychologists following an initiative by Joseph B. Rhine. Its purpose has been "to advance parapsychology as a science, to disseminate knowledge of the field, and to integrate the findings with those of other branches of science." The work of the association is reported in the Journal of Parapsychology and the Journal of the American Society for Psychical Research.

The Parapsychological Association became affiliated with the American Association for the Advancement of Science in 1969, and it is still an affiliate as of 2019.

== History ==
The Association was created in Durham, North Carolina, on June 19, 1957. Its formation was proposed by Rhine, then the director of the Duke Parapsychology Laboratory at Duke University, at the Workshop in Parapsychology held there. Using the occasion afforded by the wide representation of the field, Rhine proposed that the group form itself into the nucleus of an international professional society in parapsychology.

Its first president was R. A. McConnell, then of the Biophysics Department at the University of Pittsburgh, and the first vice-president was Gertrude R. Schmeidler of the Department of Psychology of the City College of New York. Rhea White was named secretary-treasurer. Four others were elected to the council, bringing the total to seven: Margaret Anderson, Remi J. Cadoret, Karlis Osis, and W. G. Roll. One of the co-founding supporters of PA was anthropologist Margaret Mead.

In 1984, Richard Feynman spoke at the annual convention of the association.

== Activities ==
In 1969, the association became formally affiliated with the American Association for the Advancement of Science (AAAS). The work of the association is reported in the Journal of Parapsychology and the Journal of the American Society for Psychical Research. The Association confers the Outstanding Career Award to recognize members who have sustained 20 years of research or service contributions to advance the discipline.

The current president of the PA is American clinical psychologist James C. Carpenter.

== Criticism ==
The association has its critics, including physicist John Archibald Wheeler, who tried (without success) to convince the AAAS to expel the organization in 1979. During his presentation, Wheeler incorrectly stated that J. B. Rhine had committed fraud as a student. Wheeler retracted that statement in a letter to the journal Science.

== See also ==
- American Society for Psychical Research
- International Association for Near-Death Studies
- Society for Psychical Research
- List of parapsychology topics
