= Thomas Welton Stanford =

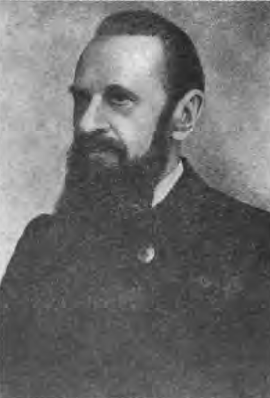
- Born: 1832; Albany, New York, US
- Died: 28 August 1918 (aged 85–86); Melbourne, Australia
- Occupation: businessperson
- Known for: businessperson; spiritualist; philanthropist

Thomas Welton Stanford (1832–1918), also known as Welton Stanford, was an American-born Australian businessman, spiritualist and philanthropist, most notably toward Stanford University, which was founded by his older brother Leland Stanford. Although living most of his adult life in Australia, he kept his American citizenship and served intermittently as honorary American vice consul-general in Melbourne.

== Biography ==
Thomas Welton Stanford was born in 1832 in Albany, New York, the youngest of six sons of Josiah Stanford, a public works contractor, and his wife Elizabeth, née Phillips. He was educated at Troy Conference Academy in Vermont. In 1852, he left for California, attracted by the California Gold Rush as were all of his brothers. They ran a store in the gold fields for a few years; by 1858 the brothers were running the largest oil company in the West. In December 1859, Thomas and his brother DeWitt Stanford moved to Melbourne.

In Australia, he became a distributor for Singer sewing machines and achieved record sales, using innovative sales techniques such as time payment. By the time Singer stopped using independent distributors in the 1880s, Stanford was a wealthy man. He became increasingly reclusive after DeWitt's death in 1862 and developed a strong interest in spiritualism. He founded the Victorian Association of Progressive Spiritualists, together with W. H. Terry and J. B. Motherwell, and sponsored many séances, becoming known as the "father of spiritualism in Australia".

He served on the board of trustees of Stanford University, which had been founded in 1891 as a memorial to Leland and Jane Stanford's only son Leland Stanford Jr., almost from its inception until his death. He was also a generous and frequent benefactor to the university. When he received a legacy from his brother Leland's will, he donated half of it ($300,000) to Stanford. He donated his books on Australia and his art collection to the university, and underwrote the construction of a library to house them. The Thomas Welton Stanford Library, built in 1900, was the university's main library until the completion of a new main library (now the Green Library) in 1919. His art collection formed the nucleus of the university's art department, and his contributions built the Thomas Welton Stanford Art Gallery on the campus, which was completed in 1917 and is still the art department's main gallery. The first Director of the Gallery was Pedro Joseph de Lemos, the former head of the San Francisco Art Institute, who staged during his tenure from 1917 to 1945 a near continuous series of exhibitions focused on important contemporary artists as well as crafts. Many of T. W. Stanford's donations to the university were earmarked for "psychical research", resulting in the publication of a 640-page volume called Experiments in Psychical Research at Leland Stanford Junior University, published in 1917. At the insistence of university lawyers, his later donations were earmarked for "psychical research and related phenomena", which was interpreted to mean the entire psychology department; for several years his grants supplied almost the entire budget for the department.

He died 28 August 1918, at his home in East Melbourne, and left the bulk of his estate to Stanford University. His papers are housed in the university archives.
