= Parapsychology =

Study of paranormal and psychic phenomena

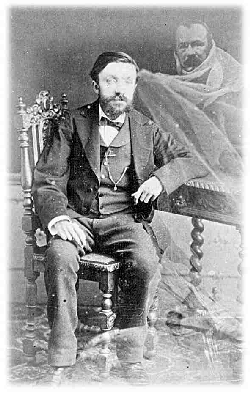
Photographs that purportedly depicted ghosts or spirits were popular during the 19th century.

Parapsychology is the study of alleged psychic phenomena (extrasensory perception, telepathy, teleportation, precognition, clairvoyance, telekinesis, and psychometry) and other paranormal claims, for example, those related to near-death experiences, synchronicity, apparitional experiences, etc. Criticized as being a pseudoscience, the majority of mainstream scientists reject it. Parapsychology has been criticized for continuing investigation despite being unable to provide reproducible evidence for the existence of any psychic phenomena after more than a century of research.

Parapsychology research rarely appears in mainstream scientific journals; a few niche journals publish most papers about parapsychology.

== Terminology ==
The term parapsychology was coined in 1889 by philosopher Max Dessoir as the German parapsychologie. It was adopted by J. B. Rhine in the 1930s as a replacement for the term psychical research to indicate a significant shift toward experimental methodology and academic discipline. The term originates from the Greek: παρά para meaning "alongside", and psychology.

In parapsychology, psi is the unknown factor in extrasensory perception and psychokinesis experiences that is not explained by known physical or biological mechanisms. The term is derived from ψ psi, the 23rd letter of the Greek alphabet and the initial letter of the Greek: ψυχή psyche, "mind, soul". The term was coined by biologist Bertold Wiesner, and first used by psychologist Robert Thouless in a 1942 article published in the British Journal of Psychology.

The Parapsychological Association divides psi into two main categories: psi-gamma for extrasensory perception and psi-kappa for psychokinesis. In popular culture, "psi" has become more and more synonymous with extraordinary psychic, mental, and "psionic" abilities and powers.

== History ==
=== Early psychical research ===
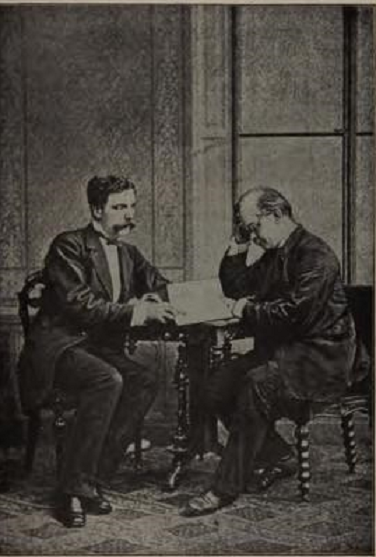
Henry Slade with Johann Karl Friedrich Zöllner

In 1853, chemist Robert Hare conducted experiments with mediums and reported positive results. Other researchers such as Frank Podmore highlighted flaws in his experiments, such as lack of controls to prevent trickery. Agenor de Gasparin conducted early experiments into table-tipping. For five months in 1853, he declared the experiments a success, being the result of an "ectenic force". Critics noted that the conditions were insufficient to prevent trickery. For example, the sitters may have moved the table with their knees, and no experimenter was simultaneously watching above and below the table.

The German astrophysicist Johann Karl Friedrich Zöllner tested the medium Henry Slade in 1877. According to Zöllner, some of the experiments were successful. However, flaws in the experiments were discovered, and critics have suggested that Slade was a fraud who performed trickery in the experiments.

The Society for Psychical Research (SPR) was founded in London in 1882. Its formation was the first systematic effort to organize scientists and scholars to investigate paranormal phenomena. Early membership included philosophers, scholars, scientists, educators and politicians, such as Henry Sidgwick, Arthur Balfour, William Crookes, Rufus Osgood Mason, and Nobel Laureate Charles Richet. Presidents of the Society included, in addition to Richet, Eleanor Sidgwick and William James, and subsequently Nobel Laureates Henri Bergson and Lord Rayleigh, and philosopher C. D. Broad.

Areas of study included telepathy, hypnotism, Reichenbach's phenomena, apparitions, hauntings, and the physical aspects of Spiritualism such as table-tilting, materialization, and apportation. In the 1880s, the Society investigated apparitional experiences and hallucinations in the sane. Among the first important works was the two-volume publication in 1886, Phantasms of the Living, which was largely criticized by scholars. In 1894, the Census of Hallucinations was published which sampled 17,000 people. Out of these, 1,684 persons admitted to having experienced a hallucination of an apparition. The SPR became the model for similar societies in other European countries and the United States during the late 19th century.

Early clairvoyance experiments were reported in 1884 by Charles Richet. Playing cards were enclosed in envelopes, and a subject was put under hypnosis to identify them. The subject was reported to have succeeded in a series of 133 trials, but the results dropped to the chance level when performed before a group of scientists in Cambridge. J. M. Peirce and E. C. Pickering reported a similar experiment in which they tested 36 subjects over 23,384 trials, which did not obtain above-chance scores.

In 1881, Eleanor Sidgwick revealed the fraudulent methods that spirit photographers such as Édouard Isidore Buguet, Frederic Hudson, and William H. Mumler had utilized. During the late nineteenth century, many fraudulent mediums were exposed by SPR investigators.

Largely due to the support of psychologist William James, the American Society for Psychical Research (ASPR) opened its doors in Boston in 1885, moving to New York City in 1905 under the leadership of James H. Hyslop. Notable cases investigated by Walter Franklin Prince of the ASPR in the early 20th century included Pierre L. O. A. Keeler, the Great Amherst Mystery and Patience Worth.

=== Rhine era ===
In 1911, Stanford University became the first academic institution in the United States to study extrasensory perception (ESP) and psychokinesis (PK) in a laboratory setting. The effort was headed by psychologist John Edgar Coover and funded by Thomas Welton Stanford, brother of the university's founder. After conducting approximately 10,000 experiments, Coover concluded that "statistical treatments of the data fail to reveal any cause beyond chance."

In 1930, Duke University became the second major U.S. academic institution to engage in the critical study of ESP and psychokinesis in the laboratory. Under the guidance of psychologist William McDougall, and with the help of others in the department—including psychologists Karl Zener, Joseph B. Rhine, and Louisa E. Rhine—laboratory ESP experiments using volunteer subjects from the undergraduate student body began. As opposed to the approaches of psychical research, which generally sought qualitative evidence for paranormal phenomena, the experiments at Duke University proffered a quantitative, statistical approach using cards and dice. As a consequence of the ESP experiments at Duke, standard laboratory procedures for the testing of ESP were developed and adopted by interested researchers worldwide.

George Estabrooks conducted an ESP experiment using cards in 1927. Harvard students were used as the subjects. Estabrooks acted as the sender, with the guesser in an adjoining room. Estabrooks conducted a total of 2,300 trials. When Estabrooks sent the subjects to a distant room with insulation, the scores dropped to chance level. Attempts to repeat the experiment also failed.

The publication of J. B. Rhine's book, New Frontiers of the Mind (1937), brought the laboratory's findings to the general public. In his book, Rhine popularized the word "parapsychology", coined by psychologist Max Dessoir over 40 years earlier, to describe the research conducted at Duke. Rhine also founded an autonomous Parapsychology Laboratory within Duke and started the Journal of Parapsychology, which he co-edited with McDougall.

Early parapsychological research employed the use of Zener cards in experiments designed to test for the existence of telepathic communication, or clairvoyant or precognitive perception.

Rhine, along with associate Karl Zener, had developed a statistical system of testing for ESP that involved subjects guessing what symbol, out of five possible symbols, would appear when going through a special deck of cards designed for this purpose. A percentage of correct guesses (or hits) significantly above 20% was perceived as higher than chance and indicative of psychic ability. Rhine stated in his first book, Extrasensory Perception (1934), that after 90,000 trials, he felt ESP is "an actual and demonstrable occurrence".

Irish medium and parapsychologist Eileen J. Garrett was tested by Rhine at Duke University in 1933 with Zener cards. Rhine placed certain symbols on the cards, sealed them in an envelope, and asked Garrett to guess their contents. She performed poorly and later criticized the tests by claiming the cards lacked a psychic energy called "energy stimulus" and that she could not perform clairvoyance to order. The parapsychologist Samuel Soal and his colleagues tested Garrett in May 1937. Soal conducted most experiments in the Psychological Laboratory at University College London. Soal recorded over 12,000 guesses, but Garrett failed to produce above chance level. In his report Soal wrote "In the case of Mrs. Eileen Garrett we fail to find the slightest confirmation of J. B. Rhine's remarkable claims relating to her alleged powers of extra-sensory perception. Not only did she fail when I took charge of the experiments, but she failed equally when four other carefully trained experimenters took my place."

The parapsychology experiments at Duke evoked much criticism from academics and others who challenged the concepts and evidence of ESP. Many psychological departments attempted to repeat Rhine's experiments with failure. W. S. Cox (1936) from Princeton University, with 132 subjects, produced 25,064 trials in a playing card ESP experiment. Cox concluded, "There is no evidence of extrasensory perception either in the 'average man' or of the group investigated or in any particular individual of that group. The discrepancy between these results and those obtained by Rhine is due either to uncontrollable factors in experimental procedure or to the difference in the subjects." Four other psychological departments failed to replicate Rhine's results. After thousands of card runs, James Charles Crumbaugh failed to duplicate the results of Rhine.

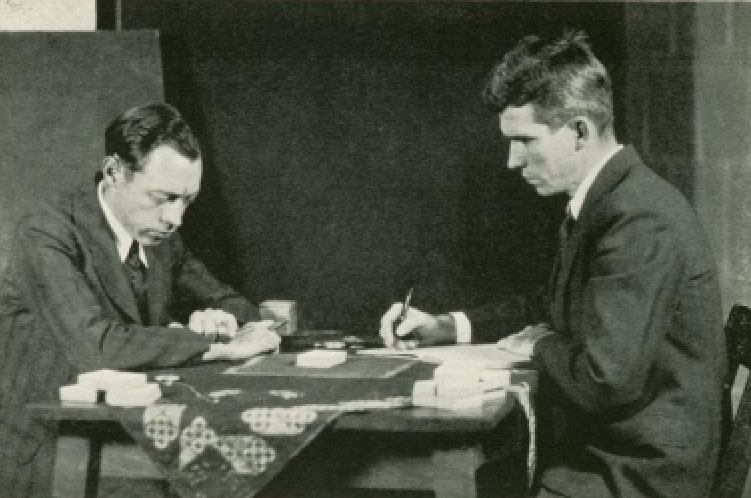
Hubert Pearce with J. B. Rhine

In 1938, the psychologist Joseph Jastrow wrote that much of the evidence for extrasensory perception collected by Rhine and other parapsychologists was anecdotal, biased, dubious and the result of "faulty observation and familiar human frailties". Rhine's experiments were discredited due to the discovery that sensory leakage or cheating could account for all his results, such as the subject being able to read the symbols from the back of the cards and being able to see and hear the experimenter to note subtle clues.

Illusionist Milbourne Christopher wrote years later that he felt "there are at least a dozen ways a subject who wished to cheat under the conditions Rhine described could deceive the investigator". When Rhine took precautions in response to criticisms of his methods, he failed to find any high-scoring subjects. Another criticism, made by chemist Irving Langmuir, among others, was one of selective reporting. Langmuir stated that Rhine did not report scores of subjects that he suspected were intentionally guessing wrong and that this, he felt, biased the statistical results higher than they should have been.

Rhine and his colleagues attempted to address these criticisms through new experiments described in the book Extrasensory Perception After Sixty Years (1940). Rhine described three experiments: the Pearce-Pratt experiment, the Pratt-Woodruff experiment, and the Ownbey-Zirkle series, which he believed demonstrated ESP. However, C. E. M. Hansel wrote, "It is now known that each experiment contained serious flaws that escaped notice in the examination made by the authors of Extra-Sensory Perception After Sixty Years". Joseph Gaither Pratt was the co-experimenter in the Pearce-Pratt and Pratt-Woodruff experiments at the Duke campus. Hansel visited the campus where the experiments took place and discovered the results could have originated through a trick, so they could not supply evidence for ESP.

In 1957, Rhine and Joseph Gaither Pratt wrote Parapsychology: Frontier Science of the Mind. Because of the methodological problems, parapsychologists no longer utilize card-guessing studies. Rhine's experiments into psychokinesis (PK) were also criticized. John Sladek wrote:

His research used dice, with subjects 'willing' them to fall a certain way. Not only can dice be drilled, shaved, falsely numbered and manipulated, but even straight dice often show bias in the long run. Casinos for this reason retire dice often, but at Duke, subjects continued to try for the same effect on the same dice over long experimental runs. Not surprisingly, PK appeared at Duke and nowhere else.

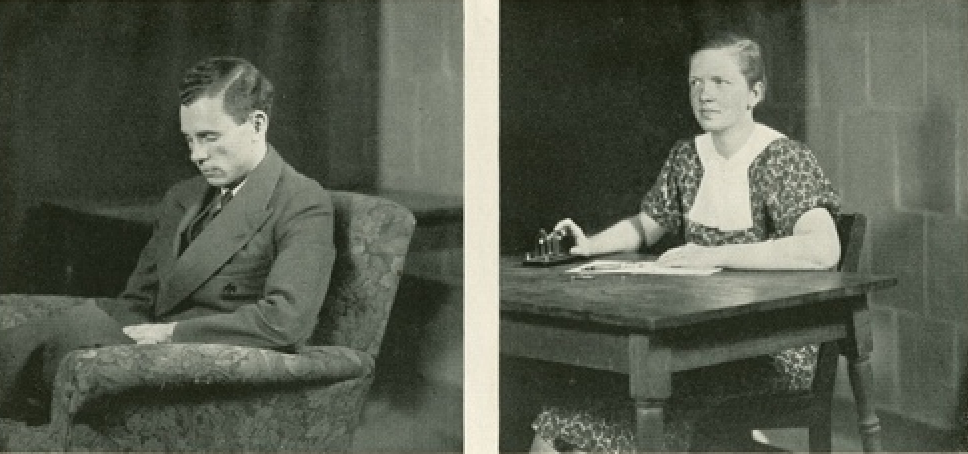
Mr. Zirkle and Miss Ownbey

Parapsychologists and skeptics criticized the Ownbey-Zirkle ESP experiment at Duke. Ownbey would attempt to send ESP symbols to Zirkle, who would guess what they were. The pair were placed in adjacent rooms, unable to see each other, and an electric fan was used to prevent the pair from communicating by sensory cues. Ownbey tapped a telegraph key to Zirkle to inform him when she was trying to send him a symbol. The door separating the two rooms was open during the experiment, and after each guess, Zirkle would call out his guess to Ownbey, who recorded his choice. Critics pointed out the experiment was flawed as Ownbey acted as both the sender and the experimenter; nobody controlled the experiment, so Ownbey could have cheated by communicating with Zirkle or made recording mistakes.

The Turner-Ownbey long-distance telepathy experiment was also flawed. May Frances Turner positioned herself in the Duke Parapsychology Laboratory, while Sara Ownbey claimed to receive transmissions 250 miles away. For the experiment, Turner would think of a symbol and write it down, while Ownbey would write her guesses. The scores were highly successful and both records were supposed to be sent to J. B. Rhine, however, Ownbey sent them to Turner. Critics pointed out this invalidated the results as she could have simply written her own record to agree with the other. When the experiment was repeated and the records were sent to Rhine, the scores dropped to average.

Lucien Warner and Mildred Raible performed a famous ESP experiment at Duke University. Warner and Raible locked a subject in a room with a switch controlling a signal light elsewhere, which she could signal to guess the card. Ten runs with ESP packs of cards were used, and she achieved 93 hits (43 more than chance). Weaknesses with the experiment were later discovered. The duration of the light signal could be varied so that the subject could call for specific symbols. Certain symbols in the experiment appeared far more often than others, indicating poor shuffling or card manipulation. The experiment was not repeated.

Duke's administration grew less sympathetic to parapsychology, and after Rhine's retirement in 1965, parapsychological links with the university were broken. Rhine later established the Foundation for Research on the Nature of Man (FRNM) and the Institute for Parapsychology as a successor to the Duke laboratory. In 1995, the centenary of Rhine's birth, the FRNM was renamed the Rhine Research Center. Today, the Rhine Research Center is a parapsychology research unit, stating that it "aims to improve the human condition by creating a scientific understanding of those abilities and sensitivities that appear to transcend the ordinary limits of space and time".

=== Establishment of the Parapsychological Association ===
The Parapsychological Association (PA) was created in Durham, North Carolina, on June 19, 1957. J. B. Rhine proposed its formation at a parapsychology workshop held at the Parapsychology Laboratory of Duke University. Rhine proposed that the group form itself into the nucleus of an international professional society in parapsychology. The aim of the organization, as stated in its Constitution, became "to advance parapsychology as a science, to disseminate knowledge of the field, and to integrate the findings with those of other branches of science".

In 1969, under the direction of anthropologist Margaret Mead, the Parapsychological Association became affiliated with the American Association for the Advancement of Science (AAAS), the largest general scientific society in the world. In 1979, physicist John A. Wheeler said that parapsychology is pseudoscientific and that the affiliation of the PA to the AAAS needed to be reconsidered.

His challenge to parapsychology's AAAS affiliation was unsuccessful. Today, the PA consists of about three hundred full, associate, and affiliated members worldwide.

=== Stargate Project ===
Beginning in the early 1950s, the CIA started extensive research into behavioral engineering. The findings from these experiments led to the formation of the Stargate Project, which handled ESP research for the U.S. federal government.

The Stargate Project was terminated in 1995 with the conclusion that it was never useful in any intelligence operation. The information was vague and included a lot of irrelevant and erroneous data. There was also reason to suspect that the research managers had adjusted their project reports to fit the known background cues.

=== 1970s and 1980s ===
The affiliation of the Parapsychological Association (PA) with the American Association for the Advancement of Science, along with a general openness to psychic and occult phenomena in the 1970s, led to a decade of increased parapsychological research. During this period, other related organizations were also formed, including the Academy of Parapsychology and Medicine (1970), the Institute of Parascience (1971), the Academy of Religion and Psychical Research, the Institute of Noetic Sciences (1973), the International Kirlian Research Association (1975), and the Princeton Engineering Anomalies Research Laboratory (1979). Parapsychological work was also conducted at the Stanford Research Institute (SRI) during this time.

The scope of parapsychology expanded during these years. Psychiatrist Ian Stevenson conducted much of his research into reincarnation during the 1970s, and the second edition of his Twenty Cases Suggestive of Reincarnation was published in 1974. Psychologist Thelma Moss studied Kirlian photography at UCLA's parapsychology laboratory. The influx of spiritual teachers from Asia and their claims of abilities produced by meditation led to research on altered states of consciousness. American Society for Psychical Research Director of Research, Karlis Osis, conducted experiments in out of body experiences. Physicist Russell Targ coined the term remote viewing for use in some of his work at SRI in 1974.

The surge in paranormal research continued into the 1980s: the Parapsychological Association reported members working in more than 30 countries. For example, research was carried out and regular conferences held in Eastern Europe and the former Soviet Union although the word parapsychology was discarded in favor of the term psychotronics. While Soviet Psychotronics included many fantastical and ineffectual methods, much like Parapsychology, it enjoyed more comprehensive state backing and explored a wide variety of both scientific and pseudo-scientific means for influencing consciousness.

The main promoter of psychotronics was Czech scientist Zdeněk Rejdák, who described it as a physical science, organizing conferences and presiding over the International Association for Psychotronic Research. In 1985, the Department of Psychology at the University of Edinburgh established a Chair of Parapsychology, awarding it to Robert Morris, an experimental parapsychologist from the United States. Morris and his research associates and PhD students pursued research on topics related to parapsychology.

=== Modern era ===
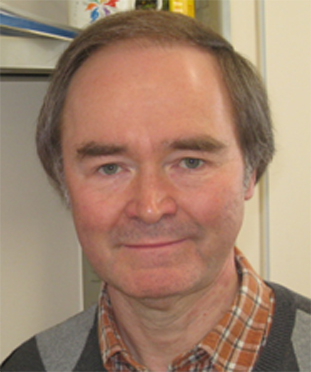
Bernard Carr (astronomer), one-time president of the Society for Psychical Research

Since the 1980s, contemporary parapsychological research has waned considerably in the United States. Early research was considered inconclusive, and parapsychologists faced strong skepticism from their academic colleagues. Some effects thought to be paranormal, for example, the effects of Kirlian photography (thought by some to represent a human aura), disappeared under more stringent controls, leaving those avenues of research at dead-ends. Most parapsychology research in the US is now confined to private institutions funded by private sources. After 28 years of research, Princeton Engineering Anomalies Research Laboratory (PEAR), which studied psychokinesis, closed in 2007.

Two universities in the United States have academic parapsychology laboratories. The Division of Perceptual Studies, a unit at the University of Virginia's Department of Psychiatric Medicine, studies the possibility of survival of consciousness after bodily death, near-death experiences, and out-of-body experiences. Gary Schwartz at the University of Arizona's Veritas Laboratory conducted laboratory investigations of mediums, criticized by scientific skeptics. Several private institutions, including the Institute of Noetic Sciences, conduct and promote parapsychological research.

Over the last two decades, some new sources of funding for parapsychology in Europe have seen a "substantial increase in European parapsychological research so that the center of gravity for the field has swung from the United States to Europe". The United Kingdom has the largest number of active parapsychologists of all nations. In the UK, researchers work in conventional psychology departments and do studies in mainstream psychology to "boost their credibility and show that their methods are sound". It is thought that this approach could account for the relative strength of parapsychology in Britain.

As of 2007, parapsychology was researched in some 30 countries, and some universities worldwide continue academic parapsychology programs. Among these are the Koestler Parapsychology Unit at the University of Edinburgh; the Parapsychology Research Group at Liverpool Hope University (this closed in April 2011); the SOPHIA Project at the University of Arizona; the Consciousness and Transpersonal Psychology Research Unit of Liverpool John Moores University; the Center for the Study of Anomalous Psychological Processes at the University of Northampton; and the Anomalistic Psychology Research Unit at Goldsmiths, University of London.

Research and professional organizations include the Parapsychological Association; the Society for Psychical Research, publisher of the Journal of the Society for Psychical Research and Psi Encyclopedia; the American Society for Psychical Research, publisher of the Journal of the American Society for Psychical Research (last published in 2004); the Rhine Research Center and Institute for Parapsychology, publisher of the Journal of Parapsychology; the Parapsychology Foundation, which published the International Journal of Parapsychology (between 1959 and 1968 and 2000–2001) and the Australian Institute of Parapsychological Research, publisher of the Australian Journal of Parapsychology. The European Journal of Parapsychology ceased publishing in 2010.

Parapsychological research has also included other sub-disciplines of psychology. These related fields include transpersonal psychology, which studies transcendent or spiritual aspects of the human mind, and anomalistic psychology, which examines paranormal beliefs and subjective anomalous experiences in traditional psychological terms.

== Research ==
=== Scope ===
Parapsychologists study some ostensible paranormal phenomena, including but not limited to:

- Telepathy: Transfer of information of thoughts or feelings between individuals by means other than the five classical senses.
- Precognition: Perception of information about future places or events before they occur.
- Clairvoyance: Obtaining information about places or events at remote locations by means unknown to current science.
- Psychokinesis: The ability of the mind to influence matter, time, space, or energy by means unknown to current science.
- Near-death experiences: An experience reported by a person who nearly died or who experienced clinical death and then revived.
- Reincarnation: The rebirth of a soul or other non-physical aspect of human consciousness in a new physical body after death.
- Apparitional experiences: Phenomena often attributed to ghosts and encountered in places a deceased individual is thought to have frequented or in association with the person's former belongings.

The definitions for the terms above may not reflect their mainstream usage nor the opinions of all parapsychologists and their critics.

According to the Parapsychological Association, parapsychologists do not study all paranormal phenomena, nor are they concerned with astrology, UFOs, cryptozoology, paganism, vampires, alchemy, or witchcraft.

Journals dealing with parapsychology include the Journal of Parapsychology, Journal of Near-Death Studies, Journal of Consciousness Studies, Journal of the Society for Psychical Research, and Journal of Scientific Exploration.

=== Experimental research ===
==== Ganzfeld ====
The Ganzfeld (German for "whole field") is a technique used to test individuals for telepathy. The technique—a form of moderate sensory deprivation—was developed to quickly quiet mental "noise" by providing mild, unpatterned stimuli to the visual and auditory senses. The visual sense is usually isolated by creating a soft red glow which is diffused through half ping-pong balls placed over the recipient's eyes. The auditory sense is usually blocked by playing white noise, static, or similar sounds to the recipient. The subject is also seated in a reclined, comfortable position to minimize the sense of touch.

In the typical Ganzfeld experiment, a "sender" and a "receiver" are isolated. The receiver is put into the Ganzfeld state, or Ganzfeld effect and the sender is shown a video clip or still picture and asked to send that image to the receiver mentally. While in the Ganzfeld, experimenters ask the receiver to continuously speak aloud all mental processes, including images, thoughts, and feelings. At the end of the sending period, typically about 20 to 40 minutes, the receiver is taken out of the Ganzfeld state and shown four images or videos, one of which is the actual target and three non-target decoys. The receiver attempts to select the target, using perceptions experienced during the Ganzfeld state as clues to what the mentally "sent" image might have been.

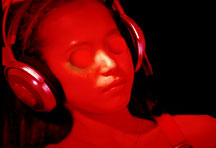
Participant of a Ganzfeld experiment. Proponents say such experiments have shown evidence of telepathy, while critics like Ray Hyman have pointed out that they have not been independently replicated.

The Ganzfeld experiment studies that were examined by Ray Hyman and Charles Honorton had methodological problems that were well documented. Honorton reported only 36% of the studies used duplicate target sets of pictures to avoid handling cues. Hyman discovered flaws in all of the 42 Ganzfeld experiments, and to assess each experiment, he devised a set of 12 categories of flaws. Six of these concerned statistical defects, and the other six covered procedural flaws such as inadequate documentation, randomization, security, and possibilities of sensory leakage. Over half of the studies failed to safeguard against sensory leakage, and all of the studies contained at least one of the 12 flaws. Because of the flaws, Honorton agreed with Hyman the 42 Ganzfeld studies could not support the claim for the existence of psi.

Possibilities of sensory leakage in the Ganzfeld experiments included the receivers hearing what was going on in the sender's room next door as the rooms were not soundproof and the sender's fingerprints to be visible on the target object for the receiver to see. Hyman reviewed the autoganzfeld experiments and discovered a pattern in the data that implied a visual cue may have taken place. Hyman wrote the autoganzfeld experiments were flawed because they did not preclude the possibility of sensory leakage.

In 2010, Lance Storm, Patrizio Tressoldi, and Lorenzo Di Risio analyzed 29 Ganzfeld studies from 1997 to 2008. Of the 1,498 trials, 483 produced hits, corresponding to a hit rate of 32.2%. This hit rate is statistically significant with p < .001. Participants selected for personality traits and personal characteristics thought to be psi-conducive were found to perform significantly better than unselected participants in the Ganzfeld condition. Hyman (2010) published a rebuttal to Storm et al. According to Hyman, "Reliance on meta-analysis as the sole basis for justifying the claim that an anomaly exists and that the evidence for it is consistent and replicable is fallacious. It distorts what scientists mean by confirmatory evidence." Hyman wrote that the Ganzfeld studies were not independently replicated and failed to produce evidence for psi. Storm et al. published a response to Hyman stating that the Ganzfeld experimental design has proved to be consistent and reliable, that parapsychology is a struggling discipline that has not received much attention, and that therefore further research on the subject is necessary. Rouder et al. 2013 wrote that critical evaluation of Storm et al.'s meta-analysis reveals no evidence for psi, no plausible mechanism and omitted replication failures.

==== Remote viewing ====
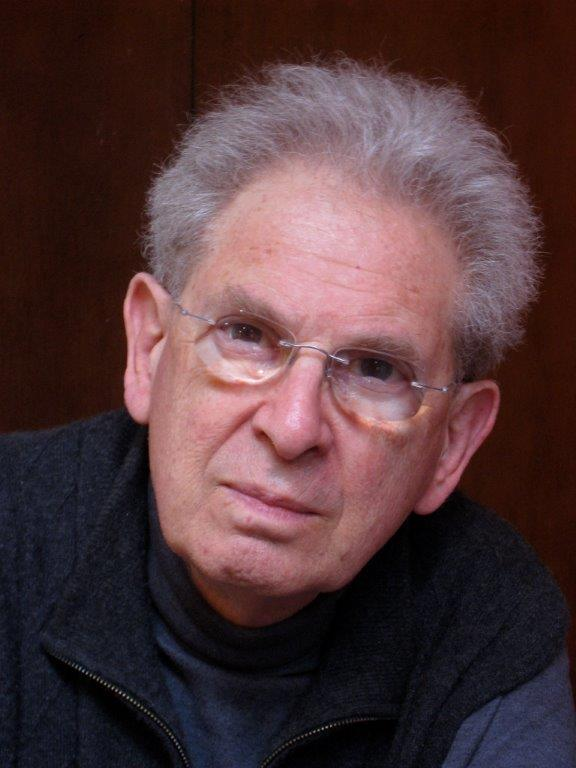
Russell Targ, co-founder of the Stargate Project

Remote viewing is the practice of seeking impressions about a distant or unseen target using subjective means, in particular, extrasensory perception. A remote viewer is typically expected to give information about an object, event, person, or location hidden from physical view and separated at some distance. Several hundred such trials have been conducted by investigators over the past 25 years, including those by the Princeton Engineering Anomalies Research Laboratory (PEAR) and by scientists at SRI International and Science Applications International Corporation. Many of these were under contract by the U.S. government as part of the espionage program Stargate Project, which terminated in 1995 having failed to document any practical intelligence value.

The psychologists David Marks and Richard Kammann attempted to replicate Russell Targ and Harold Puthoff's remote viewing experiments that were carried out in the 1970s at SRI International. In a series of 35 studies, they could not replicate the results, motivating them to investigate the procedure of the original experiments. Marks and Kammann discovered that the notes given to the judges in Targ and Puthoff's experiments contained clues as to the order in which they were carried out, such as referring to yesterday's two targets or having the session date written at the top of the page. They concluded that these clues were the reason for the experiment's high hit rates. Marks was able to achieve 100 percent accuracy without visiting any of the sites himself but by using cues. James Randi wrote controlled tests in collaboration with several other researchers, eliminating several sources of cueing and extraneous evidence present in the original tests; Randi's controlled tests produced negative results. Students could also solve Puthoff and Targ's locations from the cues included in the transcripts.

In 1980, Charles Tart claimed that rejudging the transcripts from one of Targ and Puthoff's experiments revealed an above-chance result. Targ and Puthoff again refused to provide copies of the transcripts and it was not until July 1985 that they were made available for study, when it was discovered they still contained sensory cues. Marks and Christopher Scott (1986) wrote, "Considering the importance for the remote viewing hypothesis of adequate cue removal, Tart's failure to perform this basic task seems beyond comprehension. As previously concluded, remote viewing has not been demonstrated in the experiments conducted by Puthoff and Targ, only the repeated failure of the investigators to remove sensory cues."

PEAR closed its doors at the end of February 2007. Its founder, Robert G. Jahn, said of it, "For 28 years, we've done what we wanted to do, and there's no reason to stay and generate more of the same data." Statistical flaws in his work have been proposed by others in the parapsychological and general scientific communities. The physicist Robert L. Park said of PEAR, "It's been an embarrassment to science, and I think an embarrassment for Princeton".

==== Psychokinesis on random number generators ====
The advent of powerful and inexpensive electronic and computer technologies has allowed the development of fully automated experiments studying possible interactions between mind and matter. In the most common experiment of this type, a random number generator (RNG), based on electronic or radioactive noise, produces a data stream that is recorded and analyzed by computer software. A subject attempts to mentally alter the distribution of the random numbers, usually in an experimental design that is functionally equivalent to getting more "heads" than "tails" while flipping a coin. In the RNG experiment, design flexibility can be combined with rigorous controls while collecting a large amount of data quickly. This technique has been used both to test individuals for psychokinesis and to test the possible influence on RNGs of large groups of people.

Major meta-analyses of the RNG database have been published every few years since appearing in the journal Foundations of Physics in 1986. PEAR founder Robert G. Jahn and his colleague Brenda Dunne say that the experiments produced "a very small effect" not significant enough to be observed over a brief experiment but over a large number of trials resulted in a tiny statistical deviation from chance. According to Massimo Pigliucci, the results from PEAR can be explained without invoking the paranormal because of two problems with the experiment: "the difficulty of designing machines capable of generating truly random events and the fact that statistical "significance" is not at all a good measure of the importance or genuineness of a phenomenon." Pigluicci has written that the statistical analysis used by the Jahn and the PEAR group relied on a quantity called a "p-value", but a problem with p-values is that if the sample size (number of trials) is very large, like the PEAR tests, then one is guaranteed to find artificially low p-values indicating a statistically significant result even though nothing was occurring other than small biases in the experimental apparatus.

Two German independent scientific groups have failed to replicate the PEAR results. Pigliucci has written this was "yet another indication that the simplest hypothesis is likely to be true: there was nothing to replicate." The most recent meta-analysis on psychokinesis was published in Psychological Bulletin, along with several critical commentaries. It analyzed the results of 380 studies; the authors reported an overall positive effect size that was statistically significant but very small relative to the sample size and could, in principle, be explained by publication bias.

==== Direct mental interactions with living systems ====
Formerly called bio-PK, "direct mental interactions with living systems" (DMILS) studies the effects of one person's intentions on a distant person's psychophysiological state. One type of DMILS experiment looks at the commonly reported "feeling of being stared at". The "starer" and the "staree" are isolated in different locations, and the starer is periodically asked to simply gaze at the staree via closed-circuit video links. Meanwhile, the staree's nervous system activity is automatically and continuously monitored.

Parapsychologists have interpreted the cumulative data on this and similar DMILS experiments to suggest that one person's attention directed towards a remote, isolated person can significantly activate or calm that person's nervous system. In a meta-analysis of these experiments published in the British Journal of Psychology in 2004, researchers found a small but significant overall DMILS effect. However, the study also found that the effect size was insignificant when a small number of the highest-quality studies from one laboratory were analyzed. The authors concluded that although the existence of some anomaly related to distant intentions cannot be ruled out, there was also a shortage of independent replications and theoretical concepts.

=== Dream telepathy ===
Parapsychological studies into dream telepathy were carried out at the Maimonides Medical Center in Brooklyn, New York led by Stanley Krippner and Montague Ullman. They concluded the results from some of their experiments supported dream telepathy. However, the results have not been independently replicated.

The picture target experiments that Krippner and Ullman conducted were criticized by C. E. M. Hansel. According to Hansel, there were weaknesses in the design of the experiments in the way in which the agents became aware of their target picture. Only the agent should have known the target, and no other person should have known until the targets were judged; however, an experimenter was with the agent when the target envelope was opened. Hansel also wrote that the experiment had poor controls as the main experimenter could communicate with the subject. In 2002, Krippner denied Hansel's accusations, claiming the agent did not communicate with the experimenter.

Edward Belvedere and David Foulkes attempted to replicate the picture-target experiments. The finding was that neither the subject nor the judges matched the targets with dreams above chance level. Results from other experiments by Belvedere and Foulkes were also negative.

In 2003, Simon Sherwood and Chris Roe wrote a review that claimed support for dream telepathy at Maimonides. However, James Alcock noted that their review was based on "extreme messiness" of data. Alcock concluded the dream telepathy experiments at Maimonides have failed to provide evidence for telepathy and "lack of replication is rampant".

=== Near-death experiences ===
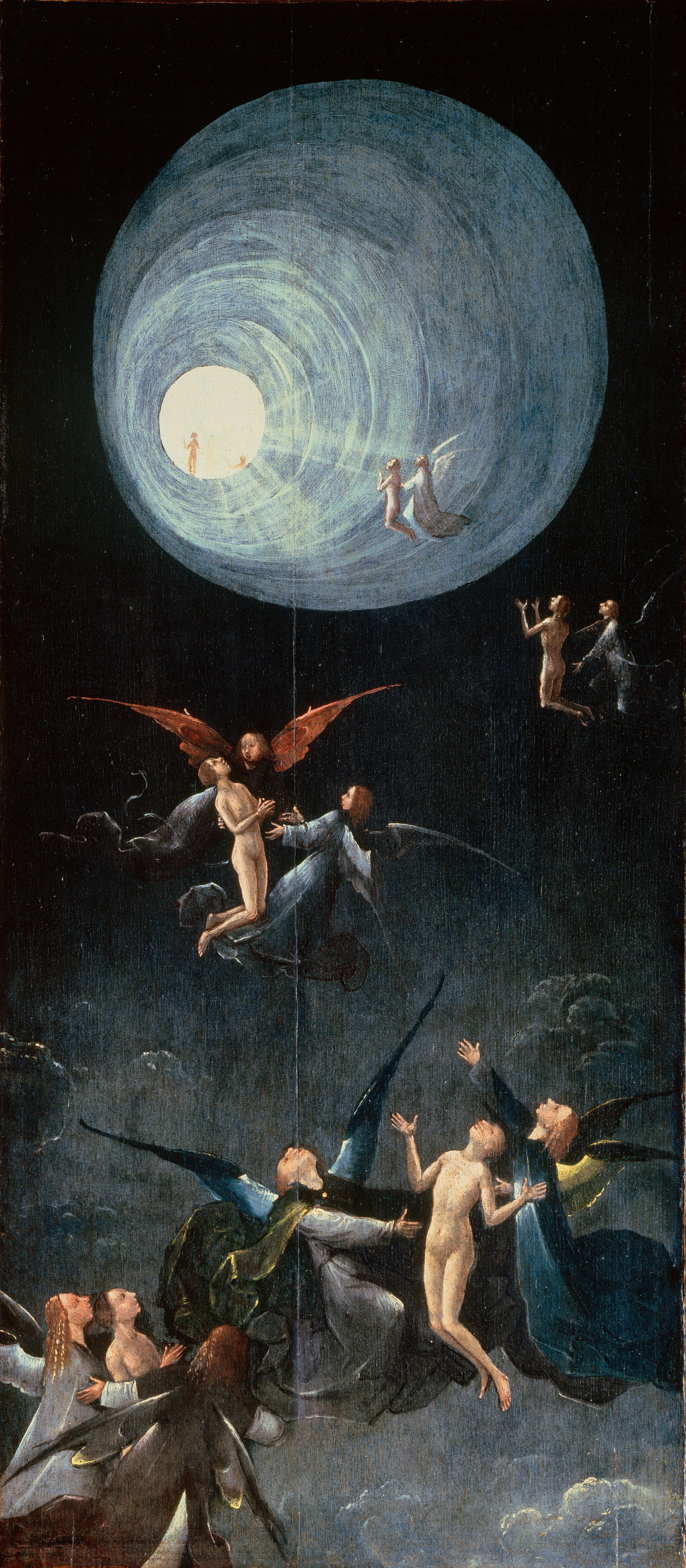
Ascent of the Blessed by Hieronymus Bosch (after 1490) depicts a tunnel of light and spiritual figures similar to those reported by near-death experiencers.

A near-death experience (NDE) is an experience reported by a person who nearly died, or who experienced clinical death and then revived. NDEs include one or more of the following experiences: a sense of being dead; an out-of-body experience; a sensation of floating above one's body and seeing the surrounding area; a sense of overwhelming love and peace; a sensation of moving upwards through a tunnel or narrow passageway; meeting deceased relatives or spiritual figures; encountering a being of light, or a light; experiencing a life review; reaching a border or boundary; and a feeling of being returned to the body, often accompanied by reluctance.

Interest in the NDE was spurred initially by the research of psychiatrists Elisabeth Kübler-Ross, George G. Ritchie, and Raymond Moody. In 1975, Moody wrote the best-selling book Life After Life and in 1977, he wrote a second book, Reflections on Life After Life. In 1998, Moody was appointed chair in "consciousness studies" at the University of Nevada, Las Vegas. The International Association for Near-death Studies (IANDS) was founded in 1978 to meet the needs of early researchers and experiencers within this field of research. Later researchers, such as psychiatrist Bruce Greyson, psychologist Kenneth Ring, and cardiologist Michael Sabom, introduced the study of near-death experiences to the academic setting.

=== Reincarnation research ===
Psychiatrist Ian Stevenson, from the University of Virginia, conducted more than 2,500 case studies over 40 years and published twelve books. He wrote that childhood memories ostensibly related to reincarnation normally occurred between the ages of three and seven years and then faded shortly afterward. He compared the memories with reports of people known to the deceased, attempting to do so before any contact between the child and the deceased's family had occurred, and searched for disconfirming evidence that could provide alternative explanations for the reports aside from reincarnation.

Some 35 percent of the subjects examined by Stevenson had birthmarks or congenital disabilities. Stevenson believed that the existence of birthmarks and deformities on children, when they occurred at the location of fatal wounds in the deceased, provided the best evidence for reincarnation. However, Stevenson has never claimed that he had proved the existence of reincarnation, and cautiously referred to his cases as being "of the reincarnation type" or "suggestive of reincarnation". Researchers who believe in the evidence for reincarnation have been unsuccessful in getting the scientific community to consider it a serious possibility.

Ian Wilson argued that a large number of Stevenson's cases consisted of poor children remembering wealthy lives or belonging to a higher caste. He speculated that such cases may represent a scheme to obtain money from the family of the alleged former incarnation. Philosopher Keith Augustine has written, "The vast majority of Stevenson's cases come from countries where a religious belief in reincarnation is strong, and rarely elsewhere, seems to indicate that cultural conditioning (rather than reincarnation) generates claims of spontaneous past-life memories." Philosopher Paul Edwards wrote that reincarnation invokes logically dubious assumptions and is inconsistent with modern science.

== Scientific reception ==
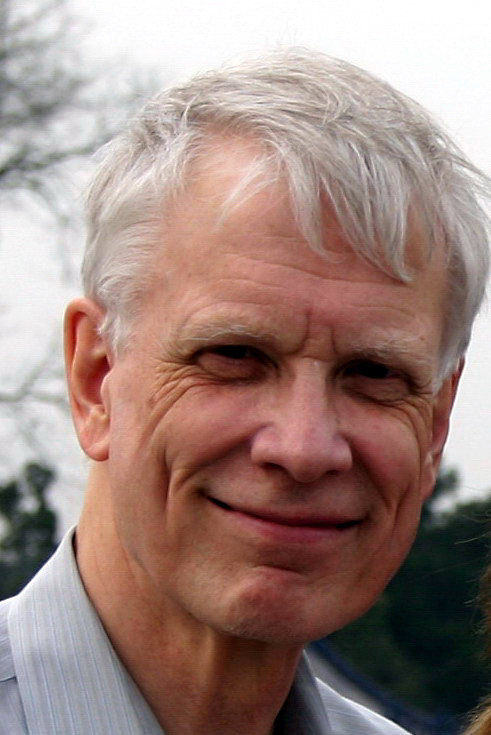
James Alcock is a notable critic of parapsychology.

=== Evaluation ===
The scientific consensus is that there is insufficient evidence to support the existence of psi phenomena.

Scientists critical of parapsychology state that its extraordinary claims require extraordinary evidence if they are to be taken seriously. Scientists who have evaluated parapsychology have written the entire body of evidence is of poor quality and not adequately controlled. In support of this view, critics cite instances of fraud, flawed studies, and cognitive biases (such as clustering illusion, availability error, confirmation bias, illusion of control, magical thinking, and the bias blind spot) as ways to explain parapsychological results. Research has also shown that people's desire to believe in paranormal phenomena causes them to discount strong evidence that it does not exist.

The psychologists Donovan Rawcliffe (1952), C. E. M. Hansel (1980), Ray Hyman (1989), and Andrew Neher (2011) have studied the history of psi experiments from the late 19th century up until the 1980s. Flaws and weaknesses were discovered in every experiment investigated, so the possibility of sensory leakage and trickery were not ruled out. The data from the Creery sister and the Soal-Goldney experiments were proven to be fraudulent, one of the subjects from the Smith-Blackburn experiments confessed to fraud, the Brugmans experiment, the experiments by John Edgar Coover and those conducted by Joseph Gaither Pratt and Helmut Schmidt had flaws in the design of the experiments, did not rule out the possibility of sensory cues or trickery and have not been replicated.

According to critics, psi is negatively defined as any effect that cannot be currently explained in terms of chance or normal causes, and this is a fallacy as it encourages parapsychologists to use any peculiarity in the data as a characteristic of psi. Parapsychologists have admitted it is impossible to eliminate the possibility of non-paranormal causes in their experiments. There is no independent method to indicate the presence or absence of psi. Persi Diaconis has written that the controls in parapsychological experiments are often loose with possibilities of subject cheating and unconscious sensory cues.

In 1998, physics professor Michael W. Friedlander noted that parapsychology has "failed to produce any clear evidence for the existence of anomalous effects that require us to go beyond the known region of science." Philosopher and skeptic Robert Todd Carroll has written research in parapsychology has been characterized by "deception, fraud, and incompetence in setting up properly controlled experiments and evaluating statistical data." The psychologist Ray Hyman has pointed out that some parapsychologists such as Dick Bierman, Walter Lucadou, J. E. Kennedy, and Robert Jahn have admitted the evidence for psi is "inconsistent, irreproducible, and fails to meet acceptable scientific standards." Richard Wiseman has criticized the parapsychological community for widespread errors in research methods including cherry-picking new procedures which may produce preferred results, explaining away unsuccessful attempted replications with claims of an "experimenter effect", data mining, and retrospective data selection.

Independent evaluators and researchers dispute the existence of parapsychological phenomena and the scientific validity of parapsychological research. In 1988, the U.S. National Academy of Sciences published a report on the subject that concluded that "no scientific justification from research conducted over a period of 130 years for the existence of parapsychological phenomena." No accepted theory of parapsychology currently exists, and many competing and often conflicting models have been advocated by different parapsychologists in an attempt to explain reported paranormal phenomena. Terence Hines in his book Pseudoscience and the Paranormal (2003), wrote, "Many theories have been proposed by parapsychologists to explain how psi takes place. To skeptics, such theory building seems premature, as the phenomena to be explained by the theories have yet to be demonstrated convincingly." Skeptics such as Antony Flew have cited the lack of such a theory as their reason for rejecting parapsychology.

In a review of parapsychological reports, Hyman wrote, "randomization is often inadequate, multiple statistical testing without adjustment for significance levels is prevalent, possibilities for sensory leakage are not uniformly prevented, errors in use of statistical tests are much too common, and documentation is typically inadequate". Parapsychology has been criticized for making no precise predictions.

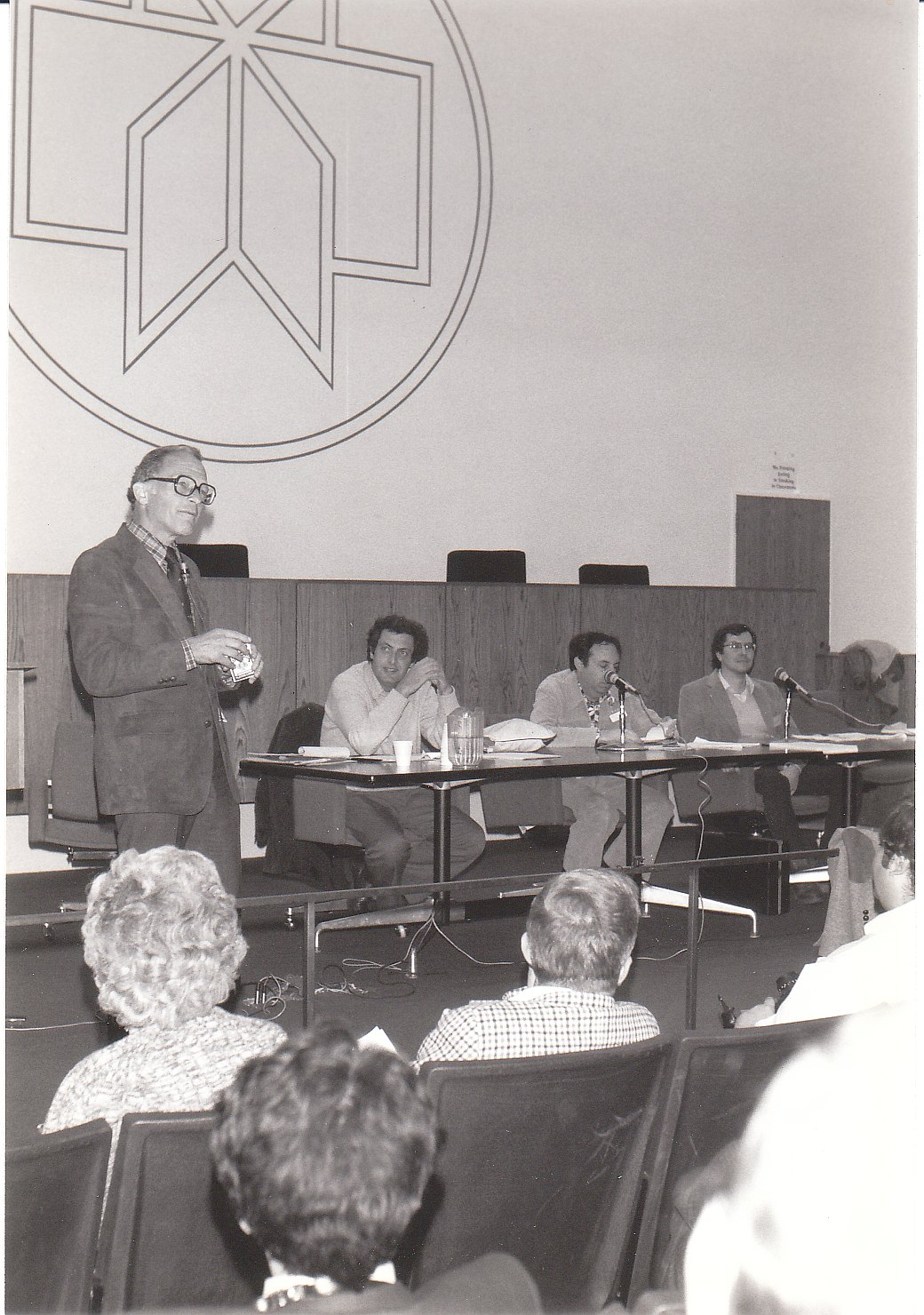
Ray Hyman (standing), Lee Ross, Daryl Bem and Victor Benassi at the 1983 CSICOP Conference in Buffalo, New York

In 2003, James Alcock Professor of Psychology at York University published Give the Null Hypothesis a Chance: Reasons to Remain Doubtful about the Existence of Psi, where he claimed that parapsychologists never seem to take seriously the possibility that psi does not exist. Because of that, they interpret null results as indicating only that they were unable to observe psi in a particular experiment rather than taking it as support for the possibility that there is no psi. The failure to take the null hypothesis as a serious alternative to their psi hypotheses leads them to rely upon many arbitrary "effects" to excuse failures to find predicted effects, excuse the lack of consistency in outcomes, and excuse failures to replicate.

Fundamental endemic problems in parapsychological research include, amongst others: insufficient definition of the subject matter, total reliance on negative definitions of their phenomena (e.g., psi is said to occur only when all known normal influences are ruled out); failure to produce a single phenomenon that neutral researchers can independently replicate; the invention of "effects" such as the psi-experimenter effect to explain away inconsistencies in the data and failures to achieve predicted outcomes; unfalsifiability of claims; the unpredictability of effects; lack of progress in over a century of formal research; methodological weaknesses; reliance on statistical procedures to determine when psi has supposedly occurred, even though statistical analysis does not in itself justify a claim that psi has occurred; and failure to jibe with other areas of science. Overall, he argues that there is nothing in parapsychological research that would ever lead parapsychologists to conclude that psi does not exist. So, even if it does not, the search will likely continue for a long time. "I continue to believe that parapsychology is, at bottom, motivated by belief in search of data, rather than data in search of explanation."

Alcock and cognitive psychologist Arthur S. Reber have criticized parapsychology broadly, writing that if psi effects were true, they would negate fundamental principles of science such as causality, time's arrow, thermodynamics, and the inverse square law. According to Alcock and Reber, "parapsychology cannot be true unless the rest of science isn't. Moreover, if psi effects were real, they would have already fatally disrupted the rest of the body of science".

Richard Land has written that from what is known about human biology, it is implausible that evolution has provided humans with ESP as research has shown the recognized five senses are adequate for the evolution and survival of the species. Michael Shermer, in the article "Psychic Drift: Why most scientists do not believe in ESP and psi phenomena" for Scientific American, wrote "the reason for skepticism is that we need replicable data and a viable theory, both of which are missing in psi research."

In January 2008, the results of a study using neuroimaging were published. To provide what are purported to be the most favorable experimental conditions, the study included appropriate emotional stimuli and had biologically or emotionally related participants, such as twins. The experiment was designed to produce positive results if telepathy, clairvoyance or precognition occurred. Still, despite this, no distinguishable neuronal responses were found between psychic and non-psychic stimuli, while variations in the same stimuli showed anticipated effects on brain activation patterns. The researchers concluded, "These findings are the strongest evidence yet obtained against the existence of paranormal mental phenomena." Other studies have attempted to test the psi hypothesis by using functional neuroimaging. A neuroscience review of the studies (Acunzo et al. 2013) discovered methodological weaknesses that could account for the reported psi effects.

A 2014 study discovered that schizophrenic patients have more belief in psi than healthy adults.

Some researchers have become skeptical of parapsychology, such as Susan Blackmore and John Taylor, after years of study and no progress in demonstrating the existence of psi by the scientific method.

=== Physics ===
The ideas of psi (precognition, psychokinesis and telepathy) violate well-established laws of physics. Psychokinesis violates the inverse-square law, the second law of thermodynamics, and the conservation of momentum. There is no known mechanism for psi.

On the subject of psychokinesis, the physicist Sean M. Carroll has written that both human brains and the spoons they try to bend are made, like all matter, of quarks and leptons; everything else they do emerges as properties of the behavior of quarks and leptons. The quarks and leptons interact through the four forces: strong, weak, electromagnetic, and gravitational. Thus, either it is one of the four known forces, or it is a new force, and any new force with a range over 1 millimeter must be at most a billionth the strength of gravity, or it will have been captured in experiments already done. This leaves no physical force that could account for psychokinesis.

Physicist John G. Taylor, who investigated parapsychological claims, wrote that an unknown fifth force causing psychokinesis would have to transmit a great deal of energy. The energy would have to overcome the electromagnetic forces binding the atoms together. The atoms would need to respond more strongly to the fifth force while it is operative than to electric forces. Therefore, such an additional force between atoms should exist all the time and not only during alleged paranormal occurrences. Taylor wrote there is no scientific trace of such a force in physics, down to many orders of magnitude; thus, if a scientific viewpoint is to be preserved, the idea of any fifth force must be discarded. Taylor concluded there is no possible physical mechanism for psychokinesis, and it is in complete contradiction to established science.

Felix Planer, a professor of electrical engineering, has written that if psychokinesis were real, then it would be easy to demonstrate by getting subjects to depress a scale on a sensitive balance, raise the temperature of a water bath which could be measured with an accuracy of a hundredth of a degree Celsius or affect an element in an electrical circuit such as a resistor which could be monitored to better than a millionth of an ampere. Planer writes that such experiments are extremely sensitive and easy to monitor but are not utilized by parapsychologists as they "do not hold out the remotest hope of demonstrating even a minute trace of PK" because the alleged phenomenon is non-existent. Planer has written that parapsychologists fall back on studies that involve only unrepeatable statistics, owing their results to poor experimental methods, recording mistakes, and faulty statistical mathematics.

According to Planer, "all research in medicine and other sciences would become illusionary, if the existence of PK had to be taken seriously; for no experiment could be relied upon to furnish objective results, since all measurements would become falsified to a greater or lesser degree, according to his PK ability, by the experimenter's wishes." Planer concluded the concept of psychokinesis is absurd and has no scientific basis.

Philosopher and physicist Mario Bunge has written that "psychokinesis, or PK, violates the principle that mind cannot act directly on matter. (If it did, no experimenter could trust his readings of measuring instruments.) It also violates the principles of conservation of energy and momentum. The claim that quantum mechanics allows for the possibility of mental power influencing randomizers—an alleged case of micro-PK—is ludicrous since that theory respects the said conservation principles, and it deals exclusively with physical things."

The physicist Robert L. Park questioned if the mind really could influence matter, then it would be easy for parapsychologists to measure such a phenomenon by using the alleged psychokinetic power to deflect a microbalance which would not require any dubious statistics but "the reason, of course, is that the microbalance stubbornly refuses to budge." Park has suggested the reason statistical studies are so popular in parapsychology is because they introduce opportunities for uncertainty and error, which are used to support the biases of the experimenter. Park wrote, "No proof of psychic phenomena is ever found. In spite of all the tests devised by parapsychologists like Jahn and Radin, and huge amounts of data collected over a period of many years, the results are no more convincing today than when they began their experiments."

=== Pseudoscience ===
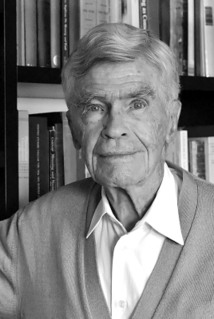
Mario Bunge has described parapsychology as a "pseudoscience paragon".

Parapsychological theories are viewed as pseudoscientific by the scientific community as incompatible with well-established laws of science. As there is no repeatable evidence for psi, the field is often regarded as a pseudoscience.

The philosopher Raimo Tuomela summarized why the majority of scientists consider parapsychology to be a pseudoscience in his essay "Science, Protoscience, and Pseudoscience".

- Parapsychology relies on an ill-defined ontology and typically shuns exact thinking.
- The hypotheses and theories of parapsychology have not been proven and are in bad shape.
- Extremely little progress has taken place in parapsychology on the whole and parapsychology conflicts with established science.
- Parapsychology has poor research problems, being concerned with establishing the existence of its subject matter and having practically no theories to create proper research problems.
- While in parts of parapsychology there are attempts to use the methods of science there are also unscientific areas; and in any case parapsychological research can at best qualify as prescientific because of its poor theoretical foundation.
- Parapsychology is a largely isolated research area.

The methods of parapsychologists are regarded by critics, including those who wrote the science standards for the California State Board of Education, to be pseudoscientific. Some of the more specific criticisms state that parapsychology does not have a clearly defined subject matter, an easily repeatable experiment that can demonstrate a psi effect on demand, nor an underlying theory to explain the paranormal transfer of information. James Alcock has stated that few of parapsychology's experimental results have prompted interdisciplinary research with more mainstream sciences such as physics or biology and that parapsychology remains an isolated science to such an extent that its very legitimacy is questionable, and as a whole is not justified in being labeled "scientific". Alcock wrote, "Parapsychology is indistinguishable from pseudo-science, and its ideas are essentially those of magic... There is no evidence that would lead the cautious observer to believe that parapsychologists and paraphysicists are on the track of a real phenomenon, a real energy or power that has so far escaped the attention of those people engaged in "normal" science."

The scientific community considers parapsychology a pseudoscience because it continues to explore the hypothesis that psychic abilities exist despite a century of experimental results that fail to demonstrate that hypothesis conclusively. A panel commissioned by the United States National Research Council to study paranormal claims concluded that "despite a 130-year record of scientific research on such matters, our committee could find no scientific justification for the existence of phenomena such as extrasensory perception, mental telepathy or 'mind over matter' exercises... Evaluation of a large body of the best available evidence simply does not support the contention that these phenomena exist."

There is also an issue of non-falsifiability associated with psi. On this subject Terence Hines has written:

The most common rationale offered by parapsychologists to explain the lack of a repeatable demonstration of ESP or other psi phenomena is to say that ESP in particular and psi phenomena in general are elusive or jealous phenomena. This means the phenomena go away when a skeptic is present or when skeptical "vibrations" are present. This argument seems nicely to explain away some of the major problems facing parapsychology until it is realized that it is nothing more than a classic nonfalsifiable hypothesis... The use of the nonfalsifiable hypothesis is permitted in parapsychology to a degree unheard of in any scientific discipline. To the extent that investigators accept this type of hypothesis, they will be immune to having their belief in psi disproved. No matter how many experiments fail to provide evidence for psi and no matter how good those experiments are, the nonfalsifiable hypothesis will always protect the belief.

Mario Bunge has written that research in parapsychology for over a hundred years has produced no firm findings or testable predictions. All parapsychologists can do is claim alleged data is anomalous and beyond the reach of ordinary science. The aim of parapsychologists "is not that of finding laws and systematizing them into theories in order to understand and forecast" but to "buttress ancient spiritualist myths or to serve as a surrogate for lost religions."

The psychologist David Marks has written that parapsychologists have failed to produce a single repeatable demonstration of the paranormal and described psychical research as a pseudoscience, an "incoherent collection of belief systems steeped in fantasy, illusion and error." However, Chris French, who is not convinced that parapsychology has demonstrated evidence for psi, has argued that parapsychological experiments still adhere to the scientific method and should not be completely dismissed as pseudoscience. "Sceptics like myself will often point out that there's been systematic research in parapsychology for well over a century, and so far the wider scientific community is not convinced." French has noted his position is "the minority view among critics of parapsychology".

Philosopher Bradley Dowden characterized parapsychology as a pseudoscience because parapsychologists have no valid theories to test or reproducible data from their experiments.

=== Fraud ===
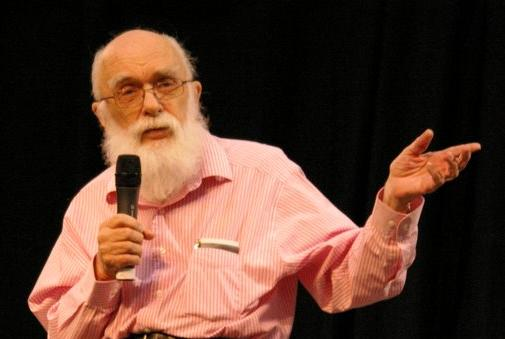
Stage magician and skeptic James Randi has demonstrated that magic tricks can simulate or duplicate some supposedly psychic phenomena.

There have been instances of fraud in the history of parapsychology research. In the late 19th century, the Creery Sisters (Mary, Alice, Maud, Kathleen, and Emily) were tested by the Society for Psychical Research and believed them to have genuine psychic ability; however, during a later experiment they were caught utilizing signal codes and they confessed to fraud. George Albert Smith and Douglas Blackburn were claimed to be genuine psychics by the Society for Psychical Research, but Blackburn confessed to fraud:

For nearly thirty years the telepathic experiments conducted by Mr. G. A. Smith and myself have been accepted and cited as the basic evidence of the truth of thought transference... ...the whole of those alleged experiments were bogus, and originated in the honest desire of two youths to show how easily men of scientific mind and training could be deceived when seeking for evidence in support of a theory they were wishful to establish.

The experiments of Samuel Soal and K. M. Goldney of 1941–1943 (suggesting the precognitive ability of a single participant) were long regarded as some of the best in the field because they relied upon independent checking and witnesses to prevent fraud. However, many years later, statistical evidence, uncovered and published by other parapsychologists in the field, suggested that Soal had cheated by altering some of the raw data.

In 1974, many experiments by Walter J. Levy, J. B. Rhine's successor as director of the Institute for Parapsychology, were exposed as fraudulent. Levy had reported on a series of successful ESP experiments involving computer-controlled manipulation of non-human subjects, including rats. His experiments showed very high positive results. However, Levy's fellow researchers became suspicious about his methods. They found that Levy interfered with data-recording equipment, manually creating fraudulent strings of positive results. Levy confessed to the fraud and resigned.

In 1974, Rhine published the paper Security versus Deception in Parapsychology in the Journal of Parapsychology, which documented 12 cases of fraud that he had detected from 1940 to 1950 but refused to give the names of the participants in the studies. Massimo Pigliucci has written:

Most damning of all, Rhine admitted publicly that he had uncovered at least twelve instances of dishonesty among his researchers in a single decade, from 1940 to 1950. However, he flaunted standard academic protocol by refusing to divulge the names of the fraudsters, which means that there is unknown number of published papers in the literature that claim paranormal effects while in fact they were the result of conscious deception.

Martin Gardner claimed to have inside information that files in Rhine's laboratory contain material suggesting fraud on the part of Hubert Pearce. Pearce was never able to obtain above-chance results when persons other than the experimenter were present during an experiment, making it more likely that he was cheating in some way. Rhine's other subjects could only obtain non-chance levels when they could shuffle the cards, which suggested they used tricks to arrange the order of the Zener cards before the experiments started.

A researcher from Tarkio College in Missouri, James D. MacFarland, was suspected of falsifying data to achieve positive psi results. Before the fraud was discovered, MacFarland published two articles in the Journal of Parapsychology (1937 & 1938) supporting the existence of ESP. Presumably speaking about MacFarland, Louisa Rhine wrote that in reviewing the data submitted to the lab in 1938, the researchers at the Duke Parapsychology Lab recognized the fraud. "...before long they were all certain that Jim had consistently falsified his records... To produce extra hits, Jim had to resort to erasures and transpositions in the records of his call series." MacFarland never published another article in the Journal of Parapsychology after the fraud was discovered.

Some instances of fraud amongst spiritualist mediums were exposed by early psychical researchers such as Richard Hodgson and Harry Price. In the 1920s, magician and escapologist Harry Houdini said that researchers and observers had not created experimental procedures that preclude fraud.

=== Criticism of experimental results ===
Critical analysts, including some parapsychologists, are unsatisfied with experimental parapsychology studies. Some reviewers, such as psychologist Ray Hyman, contend that apparently successful experimental results in psi research are more likely due to sloppy procedures, poorly trained researchers, or methodological flaws rather than to genuine psi effects. Fellow psychologist Stuart Vyse hearkens back to a time of data manipulation, now recognized as "p-hacking", as part of the issue. Within parapsychology there are disagreements over the results and methodology as well. For example, the experiments at the PEAR laboratory were criticized in a paper published by the Journal of Parapsychology in which parapsychologists independent from the PEAR laboratory concluded that these experiments "depart[ed] from criteria usually expected in formal scientific experimentation" due to "problems with regard to randomization, statistical baselines, application of statistical models, agent coding of descriptor lists, feedback to percipients, sensory cues, and precautions against cheating." They felt that the originally stated significance values were "meaningless".

In 1979, magician and debunker James Randi engineered a hoax, now referred to as Project Alpha to encourage a tightening of standards within the parapsychology community. Randi recruited two young magicians and sent them undercover to Washington University's McDonnell Laboratory, where they "fooled researchers ... into believing they had paranormal powers." The aim was to expose poor experimental methods and the credulity thought to be common in parapsychology. Randi has stated that both of his recruits deceived experimenters for three years with demonstrations of supposedly psychic abilities: blowing electric fuses sealed in a box, causing a lightweight paper rotor perched atop a needle to turn inside a bell jar, bending metal spoons sealed in a glass bottle, etc. The hoax by Randi raised ethical concerns in the scientific and parapsychology communities, eliciting criticism even among skeptical communities such as the Committee for the Scientific Investigation of Claims of the Paranormal (CSICOP), which he helped found, but also positive responses from the President of the Parapsychological Association Stanley Krippner. Psychologist Ray Hyman, a CSICOP member, called the results "counterproductive".

=== The psi assumption ===
A typical measure of psi phenomena is a statistical deviation from chance expectation. However, critics point out that statistical deviation is, strictly speaking, only evidence of a statistical anomaly, and the cause of the deviation is not known. Hyman contends that even if psi experiments that regularly reproduce similar deviations from chance could be designed, they would not necessarily prove psychic functioning. Critics have coined the term The psi assumption to describe "the assumption that any significant departure from the laws of chance in a test of psychic ability is evidence that something anomalous or paranormal has occurred...[in other words] assuming what they should be proving." These critics hold that concluding the existence of psychic phenomena based on chance deviation in inadequately designed experiments is affirming the consequent or begging the question.

=== Selection bias and meta-analysis ===
Selective reporting has been offered by critics as an explanation for the positive results reported by parapsychologists. Selective reporting is sometimes called a "file drawer" problem, which arises when only positive study results are made public, while studies with negative or null results are not made public. Selective reporting has a compounded effect on meta-analysis, which is a statistical technique that aggregates the results of many studies to generate sufficient statistical power to demonstrate a result that the individual studies themselves could not demonstrate at a statistically significant level. For example, a recent meta-analysis combined 380 studies on psychokinesis, including data from the PEAR lab. It concluded that, although there is a statistically significant overall effect, it is inconsistent, and relatively few negative studies would cancel it out. Consequently, biased publication of positive results could be the cause.

Numerous researchers have criticized the popularity of meta-analysis in parapsychology, and is often seen as troublesome even within parapsychology. Critics have said that parapsychologists misuse meta-analysis to create the incorrect impression that statistically significant results have been obtained that indicate the existence of psi phenomena. Physicist Robert Park states that parapsychology's reported positive results are problematic because most such findings are invariably at the margin of statistical significance and that might be explained by a number of confounding effects; Park states that such marginal results are a typical symptom of pathological science as described by Irving Langmuir.

Researcher J. E. Kennedy has said that concerns over meta-analysis in science and medicine also apply to problems present in parapsychological meta-analysis. As a post-hoc analysis, critics emphasize the opportunity the method presents to produce biased outcomes via selecting cases chosen for study, methods employed, and other key criteria. Critics say that analogous problems with meta-analysis have been documented in medicine, where it has been shown different investigators performing meta-analyses of the same set of studies have reached contradictory conclusions.

=== Anomalistic psychology ===
In anomalistic psychology, paranormal phenomena have naturalistic explanations resulting from psychological and physical factors, which have sometimes given the impression of paranormal activity to some people when, in fact, there have been none. According to the psychologist Chris French:

The difference between anomalistic psychology and parapsychology is in terms of the aims of what each discipline is about. Parapsychologists typically are actually searching for evidence to prove the reality of paranormal forces, to prove they really do exist. So the starting assumption is that paranormal things do happen, whereas anomalistic psychologists tend to start from the position that paranormal forces probably don't exist and that therefore we should be looking for other kinds of explanations, in particular the psychological explanations for those experiences that people typically label as paranormal.

While parapsychology has declined, anomalistic psychology has risen. It is now offered as an option in some psychology degree programs. It is also an option on the A2 psychology syllabus in the UK.

=== Skeptic organizations ===
Organizations that encourage a critical examination of parapsychology and parapsychological research include the Committee for Skeptical Inquiry, publisher of the Skeptical Inquirer; the James Randi Educational Foundation, founded by illusionist and skeptic James Randi, and the Occult Investigative Committee of the Society of American Magicians a society for professional magicians/illusionists that seeks "the promotion of harmony among magicians, and the opposition of the unnecessary public exposure of magical effects."

== See also ==
- Outline of parapsychology
- List of topics characterized as pseudoscience
