= Perrott-Warrick Fund =

A research fund for parapsychology.

The Perrott–Warrick Fund is administered by Trinity College, Cambridge, and awards grants for research in parapsychology. According to Susan Blackmore, it is the second largest source of grants for psychical research in the UK, after the University of Edinburgh's Koestler Parapsychology Unit. Caroline Watt of the University of Edinburgh has been Perrott–Warrick Senior Researcher since 2010. The position was previously held by Rupert Sheldrake, Richard Wiseman and Nicholas Humphrey.

== Background ==
The fund derives from a bequest to Trinity College by Frank Duerdin Perrott in 1937, made in memory of F. W. H. Myers (1843–1901), a fellow of Trinity and founder of the Society for Psychical Research. Another bequest was made to it in 1956 by Frederic Walmsley Warrick. C.D. Broad (1887–1971), Knightbridge Professor of Philosophy and a fellow of Trinity, was interested in parapsychology and until his death chaired the fund's committee of electors. The fund aims to study "mental or physical phenomena which seem prima facie to suggest (a) the existence of supernormal powers of cognition or action in human beings in their present life, or (b) the persistence of the human mind after bodily death."

Grant recipients have included Whately Carington (1892–1947), S.G. Soal (1889–1975), Anita Gregory (1925–1984), Stephen I. Abrams (1938–2012), G. Spencer-Brown, Trevor Hall, George Zorab, Alan Gauld, James Webb, Carl Sargent, Richard Broughton, Christopher J. Stephenson, Adrian Parker, Susan Blackmore, Wendy E. Cousins, Chris Roe, Melvyn J. Willin, and Gregory Shushan.
