= Uncanny (franchise) =

Supernatural investigation radio and television series

- The show's host Danny Robins (centre) and experts Ciaran O'Keeffe (left) and Evelyn Hollow
- Genre: Paranormal documentary
- Presented by: Danny Robins
- Country of origin: England
- Original language: English

Production
- Production companies: Bafflegab Productions & Uncanny Media (radio); BBC Studios (TV version)

Original release
- Network: BBC Radio 4, BBC Two
- Release: 23 October 2021

Uncanny is a BBC radio and television series created by Danny Robins featuring explorations of the paranormal and supernatural phenomena, first broadcast in 2021. The radio series is broadcast on BBC Radio 4 and as a podcast on BBC Sounds. A television version for BBC Two was first broadcast on 13 October 2023. The format has also been adapted as a touring stage show and since 2025 the television series has been accompanied by a visual podcast discussion called Uncanny: Post Mortem broadcast in both TV and podcast formats.

Each episode, Robins interviews a witness who has had an uncanny experience; topics include poltergeists and other ghosts, UFO sightings and cryptids. The story is punctuated by contributions from two experts who attempt to explain the experience; one expert is usually sceptical and will look to a rational psychological or natural explanation, the other will look for parallels with other similar cases. This is characterised in the series as "Team Sceptic" and "Team Believer". Experts include Caroline Watt, Chris French, Ciarán O'Keeffe and Evelyn Hollow. The theme tune "Don't Have Nightmares" is by indie band Lanterns on the Lake.

Uncanny has run for five series on radio, plus a number of Uncanny Live specials recorded in front of a live audience and various Christmas and Halloween specials. Special episodes have featured guests such as Mark Gatiss, Laura Whitmore, Laurence Rickard and David Baddiel. The fourth series, Uncanny USA, featured cases exclusively from the United States and was broadcast from April 2024. A series examining famous supernatural cases from the past, Uncanny: Cold Cases was broadcast in 2026.

== Radio episodes ==
=== Series 1 ===
No overall	No.	Title	First broadcast	Notes
1	1	The Evil in Room 611	23 October 2021	A professor recounts a haunting he experienced as a student at Alanbrooke Hall, a demolished Queen's University Belfast hall of residence in the 1970s. Alanbrooke Hall formed the subject of several subsequent episodes as further witnesses contacted the programme.
2	2	The Hanging Room	30 October 2021	A teenager and her family move to an old farm house in the countryside in search of a new start.
3	3	The Todmorden UFO	6 November 2021	Policeman Alan Godfrey has a close encounter - could it be connected to an unsolved murder in the area?
4	4	My Best Friend's Ghost	13 November 2021	A young woman is visited by the ghost of her closest friend.
5	5	Return to Room 611	20 November 2021	Another witness to the goings on at Alanbrooke Hall tells their story.
6	6	The Brooklyn Poltergeist	27 November 2021	A British model is made to feel unwelcome by her American flatmates...and the resident poltergeist.
7	7	The Angel in the Bathroom	4 December 2021	A suicidal man is saved by divine intervention.
8	8	The UFO in the Playground	11 December 2021	Follows up on the Todmorden UFO case, and features stories of two childhood UFO sightings in Wales and Africa.
9	9	I Will Kill You All	18 December 2021	Journalist Hannah Betts recounts how her family were terrorised by the legacy of a Victorian murder.
10	10	Don't Sleep in this House	25 December 2021	A climber spends a terrifying night at an abandoned cottage in the Scottish Highlands.
11	11	The Curse of Luibeilt	1 January 2022	Continuation of previous episode. The climber returns to the cottage to confront the presence.
12	12	Fatal Collision	8 January 2022	A delivery driver is involved in a life-changing accident.
13	13	The Return of Elizabeth Dacre	15 January 2022	Moving to a large house at the seaside, a young family are haunted by visions of the house's former occupant.
14	14	The Haunting of Tanfield House	22 January 2022	An art student is haunted by a poltergeist.
15	15	Bloody Hell Ken	29 January 2022	Updates on the cases featured in the series - including Alanbrooke Hall.
16	Special	Summer Special Part 1: Canadian Horror Story	25 June 2022	Something seems very wrong during a family holiday to a fishing village in Newfoundland.
17	Special	Summer Special Part 2: The Room Next Door	2 July 2022	Further evidence in the Canadian case from another witness.
18	Special	Summer Special Part 3: Uncanny Live	29 July 2022	Recorded at the Hay Festival
19	Special	Uncanny Meets Ghosts	27 September 2022	Danny Robins discusses ghosts with special guest Laurence Rickard, co-creator of the sitcom Ghosts.
20	Special	Christmas Special	23 December 2022	A terrifying encounter for a mother and son in a Scottish council house.
21	Special	Uncanny Live with Mark Gatiss	30 December 2022	With special guest Mark Gatiss

=== Series 2 ===
No overall	No.	Title	First broadcast	Notes
22	1	The Boy in Room 3	8 April 2023	A young woman takes a job as a cook at Ampleforth Abbey and finds herself alone in her accommodation - except for the sound of a crying child.
23	2	My Family's Poltergeist	15 April 2023	A malevolent poltergeist plagues a family.
24	3	Leave the Lights On	22 April 2023	Continuation of the previous episode.
25	4	Inside Room 611	29 April 2023	More evidence from the haunting at Alanbrooke Hall.
26	5	Uncanny Live at UncannyCon	6 May 2023	With special guest Laura Whitmore. A group of women find themselves with identical bruises after visiting Greyfriars Kirkyard in Edinburgh.
27	6	An Angel Called Bernie	13 May 2023	A soldier's life is saved by the ghost of his grandmother.
28	7	The Rendlesham UFO	20 May 2023	Retired USAF officer Lieutenant Colonel Charles Halt recounts his experience in the famous Rendlesham Forest incident of December 1980.
29	8	The Guest Book	27 May 2023	A young couple discover why the previous occupant of their Victorian shop never went upstairs.
30	9	The Beast of Langeais	3 June 2023	Two backpackers visit the Château de Langeais in France and have a terrifying encounter after dark.
31	10	Harry Called	20 June 2023	A student participates in a Ouija board session, and receives a message from "Harry". He is soon plagued by telephone calls and visitations.
32	11	Uncanny Live at Hay	17 June 2023	With special guest David Baddiel at the Hay Festival. A London Underground guard sees the ghost of a lost girl at Russell Square station.
33	12	The Ghost That Followed Us Home	24 June 2023	A ghostly girl spotted on family holiday to France appears again closer to home.

=== Series 3 ===
No overall	No.	Title	First broadcast	Notes
34	Special	Season 2 Case Update	20 September 2023	Looking back on some of the cases from the second series with further evidence.
35	1	The Blue Man	30 September 2023	The apparition of a blue figure in a bedroom in Wales is witnessed by multiple people over many years.
36	2	Uncle Jack	7 October 2023	A couple move into a dilapidated cottage - could the footsteps from the floor above be the ghost of a late relative?
37	Special	Miss Howard, The Bearpark Poltergeist and The Oxford Exorcism - Case Update	31 October 2023	Updates on the three cases in the television adaptation.
38	3	The Ghost Who Hated Parties	8 November 2023	Three students in Waterford, Ireland find their revelries disturbing a resident spirit.
39	4	Elton's Phone	15 November 2023	A child's toy telephone starts ringing in the night, heralding a sequence of increasingly disturbing incidents.
40	5	Double Trouble	22 November 2023	Two doppelgänger cases are examined - a family from Newcastle witness themselves driving the other way in their classic car, and a disabled woman's suicidal thoughts are ended after seeing a vision of herself as an older woman.
41	6	Good Evening	29 November 2023	A nurse moves into a regular suburban house with her husband and newborn baby, but keeps hearing the voice of a well-spoken man in her ear.
42	Special	Christmas Special: The Haunting of Daisy May Cooper	25 December 2023	Danny Robins joins writer and actor Daisy May Cooper to investigate whether her house is haunted.
43	Special	S3 Case Update	14 February 2024	Updates on the cases from series 3.

Three repeated 'Classic Cases' with new introductions by Laurence Rickard, Daisy May Cooper and Reece Shearsmith were broadcast on 14, 21 and 28 October while the television adaptation was on air.

=== Series 4: Uncanny USA ===
No overall	No.	Title	First broadcast	Notes
44	1	The Flood	30 April 2024	A man's Voodoo-practicing aunt dies in Hurricane Katrina. After inheriting her Ouija board, he soon regrets attempting to contact her.
45	2	Dad's Phone	7 May 2024	A controlling former spy promises to contact his daughter after his death if he can find a way. After his death from cancer, his old phone starts ringing.
46	3	The Platte County Poltergeist	14 May 2024	A family build their dream house in rural Missouri - but are soon troubled by poltergeist activity and visions of a man in an upstairs bedroom. Can a new house be haunted?
47	4	The Hairy Man	21 May 2024	Three relatives prospecting for gold in the Alaskan wilderness encounter a tribe of humanoid creatures outside their cabin in the forest. Could it be the legendary Bigfoot?
48	5	The Mystery of Willow Creek	28 May 2024	Danny visits Willow Creek in Humboldt County, California, the "Bigfoot capital of the world" and hears what happened next in the case from the previous week.
49	6	Series 4 Case Update	4 June 2024	Updates on some of the cases from series 4.
50	7	The Burnt Man	11 June 2024	A man is troubled by visions of a charred figure he saw as a child while living in the Mojave Desert.
51	8	What Lies Beyond	18 June 2024	Double bill. An 911 emergency responder in Maine receives a call warning about a fire that doesn't yet exist. A funeral home in Kansas is troubled by one of its occupants.
52	9	The Labor Day UFO	25 June 2024	Interviews with multiple witnesses and unwilling participants in the 1969 Labor Day UFO incident in Berkshire County, Massachusetts.
53	10	Arthur's House	2 July 2024	After buying a cottage in the upmarket California town of Montecito a woman finds herself made less than welcome by the ghost of its previous owner.

=== Halloween: Trilogy of Terror ===
No overall	No.	Title	First broadcast	Notes
54	Special	Halloween Special with Stewart Lee	29 October 2024	Danny is joined by comedian Stewart Lee to examine some spooky cases; a man tells the story of a child being physically moved by a ghost near Loch Ness, a man recalls sharing a dream with Rick Astley, a man's father is terrorised by Black Shuck in The Fens and a woman experiences a time slip back to a World War II pub.
55	Special	Halloween Special: Meadow Cottage Part 1	5 November 2024	A family are terrorised in their 200-year-old house in the Lake District.
56	Special	Halloween Special: Meadow Cottage Part 2	12 November 2024	The story of Meadow Cottage continued.

==== Halloween Countdown ====
A series of short cases from listeners' emails released daily on BBC Sounds in the run-up to Halloween 2024, beginning on 1 October 2024.

=== Uncanny Christmas ===
No overall	No.	Title	First broadcast	Notes
57	Special	Return to Luibeilt	25 December 2024	In series one, Phil recounted a terrifying night spent in a haunted climber's bothy at Luibeilt in the Scottish Highlands. Fifty years later, Danny and his producer join Phil on a hike to spend the night at the ruined bothy and record their experiences.
58	Special	Uncanny Live with Reece Shearsmith	3 January 2025	Actor and writer Reece Shearsmith joins Danny for an episode recorded at UncannyCon at the Royal Festival Hall.

=== Uncanny Summer Specials 2025 ===
No overall	No.	Title	First broadcast	Notes
58	Special	The Torrelaguna House Part 1	10 June 2025	A former soldier staying at a medieval mansion in Torrelaguna, Spain sees a terrifying creature on his bed.
59	Special	The Torrelaguna House Part 2	17 June 2025	Further witnesses attest to the strange goings on at the house.
60	Special	Uncanny Live at the Hay Festival 2025	24 June 2025	Danny is joined by Ciaran O'Keeffe and Evelyn Hollow for a recording made at the Hay Festival 2025.

==== Halloween Countdown ====
New short cases from listeners every day during October 2025.

=== Series 5 ===
No overall	No.	Title	First broadcast	Notes
61	1	The Haunted Street – Halloween Special	31 October 2025	A woman moves into a Georgian terrace in Bath and starts experiencing strange phenomenon - enquiries to her neighbours find she is not alone.
62	2	Old Jim	4 November 2025	A teenage girl and her mother enter a battle of nerves with a former resident of a remote Yorkshire farmhouse.
63	3	The Devil's Den UFO	11 November 2025	A camping trip to Arkansas ends with an out of this world encounter.
64	4	Road Ghosts	18 November 2025	Two police officers encounter a terrifying roadside apparition in Kent.
65	5	The Goth Poltergeist	25 November 2025	A student house in Fenham, Newcastle upon Tyne, becomes the centre of supernatural activity.
66	6	Impossible Encounters	2 December 2025	The pick of the creepiest stories told by audience members of the Uncanny Live tour.
67	7	The Magnet	9 December	A young solicitor moves to London, but immediately regrets her decision.
68	8	Revenants and Revelations	16 December 2025	Updates on some of the earlier cases in the series.
69	9	Christmas Casebook with Diane Morgan	23 December 2025	Comedian and actor Diane Morgan reveals her own supernatural encounters.
70	10	The Priest Hole	30 December 2025	Renovations on an Elizabethan house reveal a priest hole and increasingly disturbing apparitions.

=== Uncanny: Cold Cases ===
In Uncanny: Cold Cases, some famous supernatural cases from the past are re-examined. As well as broadcasts on BBC Sounds and Radio 4, Cold Cases launched a dedicated Uncanny YouTube channel. The theme song "Secrets Still Remain" was written and performed by folk singer Katherine Priddy.

No overall	No.	Title	First broadcast	Notes
71	1	The Black Monk of Pontefract	7 April 2026	Re-examining the notorious 1960s poltergeist case in Pontefract, West Yorkshire.
72	2	Return to East Drive	14 April 2026	Part 2 of the Pontefract poltergeist case - events take a violent turn.
73	3	The White Mountain UFO	21 April 2026	Examines the 1961 case of Barney and Betty Hill who claimed to have been abducted by extraterrestrials in the White Mountain National Forest, New Hampshire.
74	4	The Cock Lane Poltergeist	28 April 2026	A famous London poltergeist case from 1762 - a ghost accuses a man of murder.
75	5	The Sandown Clown	5 May 2026	In the 1970s, two children encounter a strange clown-like figure near, Sandown on the Isle of Wight.
76	6	The Haunting of HMS Asp	12 May 2026	A 19th century naval vessel is reputed to be haunted.
77	7	Spring-heeled Jack	19 May 2026	Was Spring-heeled Jack, who terrorised 19th century London a vicious prankster or a demon?.
78	8	The South Shields Poltergeist Part 1	26 May 2026	A young family's terrace house in South Shields become a focus of abnormal activity in 2005.
79	9	The South Shields Poltergeist Part 2	2 Jun 2026	Further examination of the noughties poltergeist case.
80	10	The Great Amherst Mystery	9 Jun 2026	Looking at the evidence of the Great Amherst Mystery, a 19th-century spiritualism case in Canada.
81	11	Borley Rectory Part 1	15 Jun 2026	The team turn their attention to the most famous haunted house case in England - Borley Rectory in Essex.
82	12	Borley Rectory Part 2	23 Jun 2026	Further examination of the haunting at Borley Rectory as Harry Price begins his investigation.
83	13	Case Update	30 Jun 2026	Retrospective of the cold cases, with questions and theories from listeners.

=== Uncanny Summer Specials 2026 ===
No overall	No.	Title	First broadcast	Notes
84	Special	Live from Hay Festival 2026	7 July 2026	An office worker is troubled by repeated supernatural occurrences in the workplace - including witnesses to a strange apparition on a video call.
85	Special	Cold Cases Live: The Enfield Poltergeist	14 July 2026	Examines the Enfield poltergeist case, the famous poltergeist case from the 1970s.
86	Special	Little Biter	21 July 2026	A family in Ramsgate, Kent, is troubled by visions of the ghost of a little girl who seems to bite people; but that's only the first disturbance.

=== Halloween Special 2026 ===
No overall	No.	Title	First broadcast	Notes
87	Special	Halloween Special 2026	31 October 2026	A Beefeater at the Tower of London recounts a terrifying experience after moving into his rooms.

==== Halloween Countdown ====
Daily short cases from listeners' emails released on BBC Sounds and YouTube in the run-up to Halloween 2026.

=== Series 6 ===
No overall	No.	Title	First broadcast	Notes
88	1	The Cliffsend Haunting	10 October 2026	A new build house on the Isle of Thanet in Kent should be ghost free - but everybody in the family sees a strange black figure.
89	2	Project Ghost	17 October 2026	A renovation project in South Wales is stalled when the builders abandon the site in terror.
90	3	The Sunbury Avenue Poltergeist	24 October 2026	A student house in West Jesmond, Newcastle upon Tyne has an additional resident.

== Television version ==
A television series for BBC Two was broadcast from Friday 13 October 2023 for three episodes, and renewed for a second series of four episodes broadcast from 31 January 2025. Each episode is one hour long and features experts from the radio series. From the second series these are followed by a visualised podcast, Uncanny: Post Mortem broadcast on BBC Two and BBC Sounds.

=== Series 1 ===
No overall	No.	Title	First broadcast	Notes
1	1	Miss Howard	13 October 2023	Two separate families are troubled by repeated appearances of an Edwardian spectre in a house in Melbourn, Cambridgeshire.
2	2	The Bearpark Poltergeist	20 October 2023	A boy living in a house in Bearpark, County Durham witnesses poltergeist activity.
3	3	The Oxford Exorcism	27 October 2023	Three students find their student house in Oxford plagued by an evil spirit.

=== Series 2 ===
No overall	No.	Title	First broadcast	Notes
4	1	The Haunting of Hollymount Farm	31 January 2025	Danny meets Liam, whose account of poltergeist activity at Hollymount Farm near Tottington, Greater Manchester turns out to have been experienced by three generations of his family and his closest friends. Could it be linked to the former Holly Mount Orphanage which once owned the land?
5	2	The Charity Shop Poltergeist	7 February 2025	Sybil recounts a terrifying experience that happened when working as manager of a charity shop. Is "George" the ghost of a man-about-town draper?
6	3	Shadow Man	14 February 2025	Following the death of his father, Julian begins to be stalked by a tall shadowy figure, a phenomenon witnessed by multiple friends. After another bereavement, his encounters take a turn for the worse.
7	4	Emily's Room	21 February 2025	At their newly renovated house in Southport, a mother and daughter are terrorised by the ghosts of a girl and a sinister man.

== Stage show ==
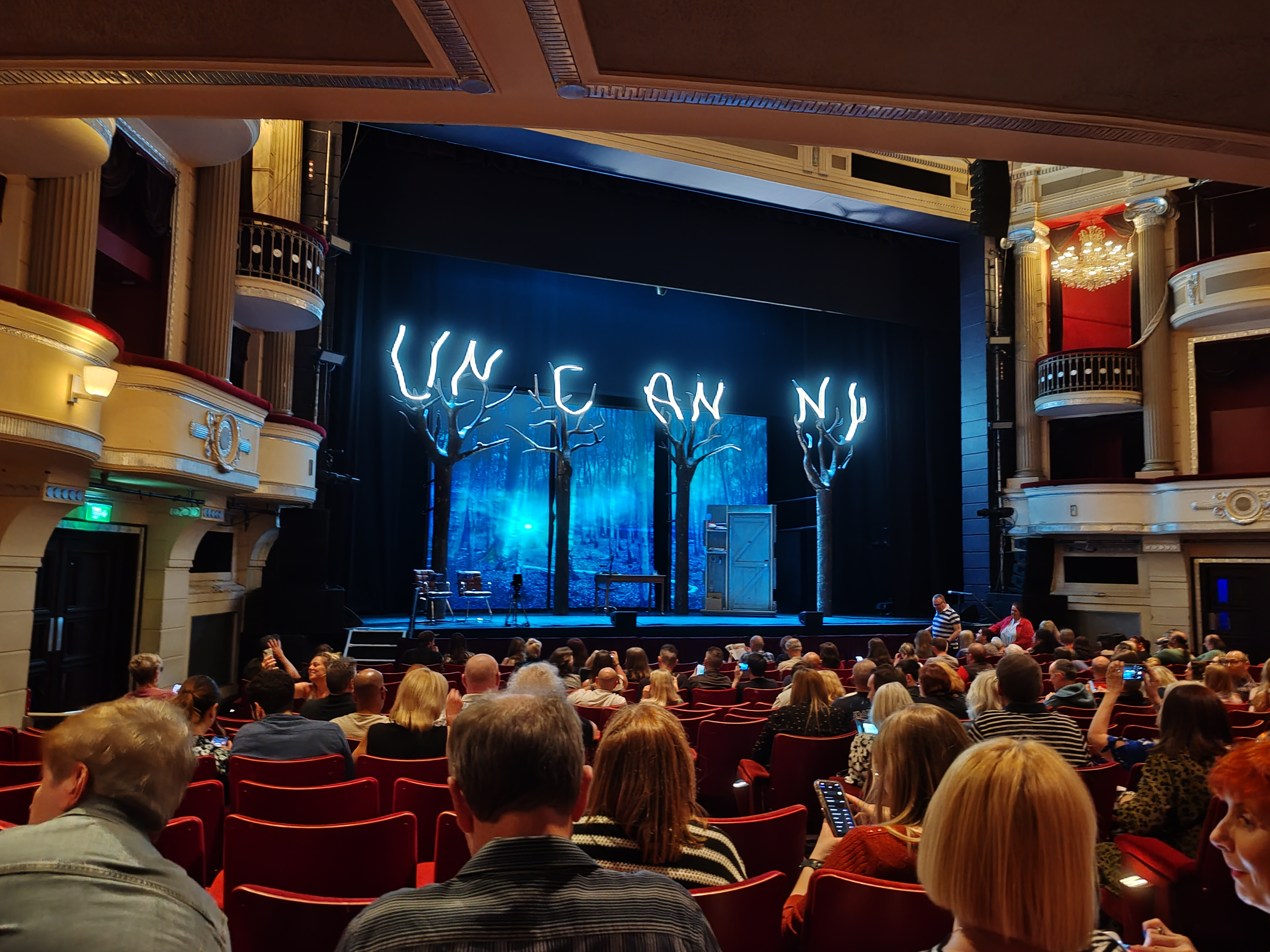
The stage set for an Uncanny live show in 2024

The programme has been adapted into a touring stage show, Uncanny Live: I Know What I Saw which toured the UK in 2024, hosted by Danny Robins with appearances from experts such as Ciarán O'Keeffe and Evelyn Hollow, followed by Uncanny: Fear of the Dark in 2025-6. An arena tour, Uncanny: The Haunted Arena Tour is scheduled for 2027.
