= Ciarán O'Keeffe =

English paranormal investigator

- O'Keeffe in 2024
- Born: Norwich, England, UK
- Citizenship: United Kingdom, Switzerland
- Known for: Paranormal investigator on Most Haunted; sceptic contributor on Uncanny

Ciarán O'Keeffe is a British–Swiss chartered psychologist specialising in parapsychology and forensic psychology. Ciarán attended John Hampden Grammar School in High Wycombe, Buckinghamshire. He is currently employed at Buckingham New University. He has held research associate position at the University of Toulouse II – Le Mirail and the University of Paris, as well as an online tutor position at Derby University. Previously employed at Liverpool Hope University, lecturing in psychology with a parapsychology component, O'Keeffe is a member of the Society for Psychical Research and an advisor to The Ghost Club. According to his own website, he completed his PhD at the University of Hertfordshire under the supervision of Richard Wiseman and Julia Buckroyd.

== Early life ==
O'Keeffe was born in Norwich to a Swiss mother and an Irish father, and he grew up in Norfolk, Somerset and High Wycombe.

His interest in parapsychology began when he started reading ghost and horror stories while growing up. He cites Edgar Allan Poe and H. P. Lovecraft among his favourite authors. He was also inspired by the British television series Arthur C. Clarke's Mysterious World and the Ghostbusters films.

== Television career ==
O'Keeffe became known in the United Kingdom following his appearances on Living TV's paranormal television series Most Haunted Ghost Adventures Hellfire episode and Jane Goldman Investigates, where he performs the role of parapsychologist and paranormal investigator. He also featured in National Geographic Channel's 2005 series Paranormal?. Recently he has often appeared as a sceptic on 'Uncanny', a BBC Sounds podcast and BBC 2 TV show in the UK hosted by Danny Robins. O'Keeffe is an open-minded sceptic on most paranormal phenomena.

== Other information ==
O'Keeffe attended Washington College in Chestertown, Maryland, where he double majored in music and psychology. He then completed a MSc in investigative psychology at the University of Liverpool before studying for his PhD at University of Hertfordshire. He is currently the Associate Dean of Education for the College of Health and Society Buckinghamshire New University.

Following his bachelor's degree at Washington College, O'Keeffe worked in psychiatric nursing at various locations in South East England, then briefly working for Dian Fossey Gorilla Fund before moving to Spain and teaching English as a foreign language in Spain, before following an academic career in psychology.

O'Keeffe is married to Anna.
