= Paranormality (book) =

2011 book by Richard Wiseman

Paranormality: Why we see what isn't there
- Author: Richard Wiseman
- Language: English, German
- Subject: Paranormal phenomena
- Publisher: Macmillan
- Publication date: 17 August 2011
- Publication place: United Kingdom
- Media type: Print
- Pages: 189
- Awards: Center for Inquiry's Robert P. Balles award – 2011
- ISBN: 978-0956875655
- Preceded by: 59 Seconds: Change Your Life in Under a Minute
- Followed by: Rip it up: The Radically new Approach to Changing your Life

Paranormality: Why we see what isn't there is a 2011 book about the paranormal by psychologist and magician Richard Wiseman. Wiseman argues that paranormal phenomena such as psychics, telepathy, ghosts, out-of-body experiences, prophesy and more do not exist, and explores why people continue to believe, and what that tells us about human behavior and the way the brain functions. Wiseman uses QR codes throughout the book, which link to YouTube videos as examples and as experiments the reader can participate in to further explain the phenomena. Because of a cautious American publishing market, it was only available in America through Kindle. Paranormality was awarded the Center for Inquiry's Robert P. Balles award for 2011.

== Contents ==
Interviewed by Swoopy for the Skepticality podcast, Wiseman stated the book has a high impact on readers because it is interactive. Surveying paranormal books before writing Paranormality, Wiseman asked himself what about these books engages the readers. "It's all about you, it's about your brain, it's about your behavior, it's about your beliefs". ... "getting people involved and finding out yourself". One reason the title of the book does not instantly reveal if it is supportive or skeptical of the paranormal is that they wanted it to appeal to people interested in the paranormal. The goal was to be clear that believers are not stupid, that anyone can fall for this kind of stuff, and "Hey here are some fun things you can try". Wiseman felt there was no single volume of work that could be handed to someone who wanted to learn about skepticism so he wrote Paranormality.

Interviewer Kylie Sturgess asked Wiseman if the book was something he had been meaning to write for some time, as there is "so much in it". Wiseman replied that it was something that he pitched over fifteen years prior but he could not find "the right angle on it". Finally, he decided that he could write it in a way that it was not a debunking book. He told Sturgess that researching the paranormal tells us a lot about the brain and how we can be deceived. For example, he talks about people who claim they are being attacked by a ghost or an entity when they are starting to wake up; this information tells us a lot about sleep. Suggestibility, he says, also plays an important role when studying the paranormal. The book has many tests the reader can take to discover how suggestible they are. The "underlying theme of the book" is how easily people are fooled when they don't have "the scientific method at your fingertips." Wiseman says that the chapter in the book where he explains psychic tricks is the most controversial; psychics "don’t want people to know that stuff." He stresses that it "would be a huge shift" if people contacted consumer affairs organizations asking for the evidence of these paranormal claims.

== Reception ==
Astronomer and friend of Wiseman, Phil Plait reviewed the book on his Discover Magazine blog, and encouraged anyone interested in the paranormal to get the book. He found it entertaining and fun to read with many "flashes of dry British wit". Plait was not surprised by anything in the book regarding the methods and explanations of the paranormal, "but the sections where Richard discusses our brain were somewhat new to me and honestly fascinating. He (Wisemam) discusses how our senses inform our brain, and how these methods sometimes fail to represent reality faithfully."

The Daily Texan writes that the book covers many different topics, but somehow "the book comes across as a coherent whole rather than as a scattershot overview", though at times the reviewer feels that Wiseman comes across as "a little too cutesy for his own good". The Journal of Parapsychology reviewed the book stating that "Wiseman is a good writer. His latest and several of his previous books also reveal that he possesses a sense of humor." The reviewer takes issue with Wiseman's statement that magicians are rarely believers in the paranormal, and faults Wiseman for not mentioning Rupert Sheldrake's experiments with a "psychic dog." The reviewer also questions giving credit to James Randi as being the expert on psychic research and not to people the reviewer feels are also experts.

According to Barry Karr from the Center for Inquiry, Wiseman has not written a typical skeptic book wherein he seeks information in order to debunk paranormal phenomena. Wiseman feels that we can learn a lot about "'brains, behavior and beliefs'" from why people believe in the paranormal.

The part of the book that interviewer Swoopy from the Skepticality podcast enjoyed most was the chapter that explained the history behind the spiritualist movement. She thinks that it is important to remind people that psychics today are using the same tricks from the mid-1850s when spiritualism was invented. She found the history of Michael Faraday's methods that he used during table-turning to see if people were consciously or unconsciously moving the table, or if something paranormal was happening, "fascinating". Her next favorite chapter was Gef the talking mongoose. Wiseman added that there were people who did not want him to include the story of Gef in the book as it was not a paranormal story. Wiseman used the story as a "fun intermission between the meatier chapters".

Not all in the book is about the fun of the paranormal, according to Swoopy, as the chapter on cults was quite depressing. Wiseman responded that the chapter on mind control was one he had been wanting to write about for a long time. Finally, in this book, he was able to discuss how it is used in our daily lives, and that cult leaders like Jim Jones used these tricks to exploit his followers. It wasn't that his followers were stupid, Wiseman states, but that Jones used the "foot-in-the-door" technique where you ask for something very small, and when they agree you then keep asking for something bigger until you have asked for the follower to give up all their assets. And in the case of Jones, eventually their lives. The book emphasizes the need to make "people into informed consumers, to understand some of the tricks these people use".

Asked what kind of reception he receives from the believers, Wiseman responded on the Point of Inquiry podcast that, based on reviews from believers on Amazon, "they hate it... bookstores mostly tell you that the paranormal is true". He expands by saying that he did not write the book for believers, he does not think he will convince anyone that truly believes. This book was written for skeptics to have fun with and to show their friends, but mainly for those people who have not yet made up their minds... "Why should they be subjected to only one side of the argument?" It is difficult to change minds that are already convinced, you have to give them something to replace it, "the message has to have an emotional appeal."

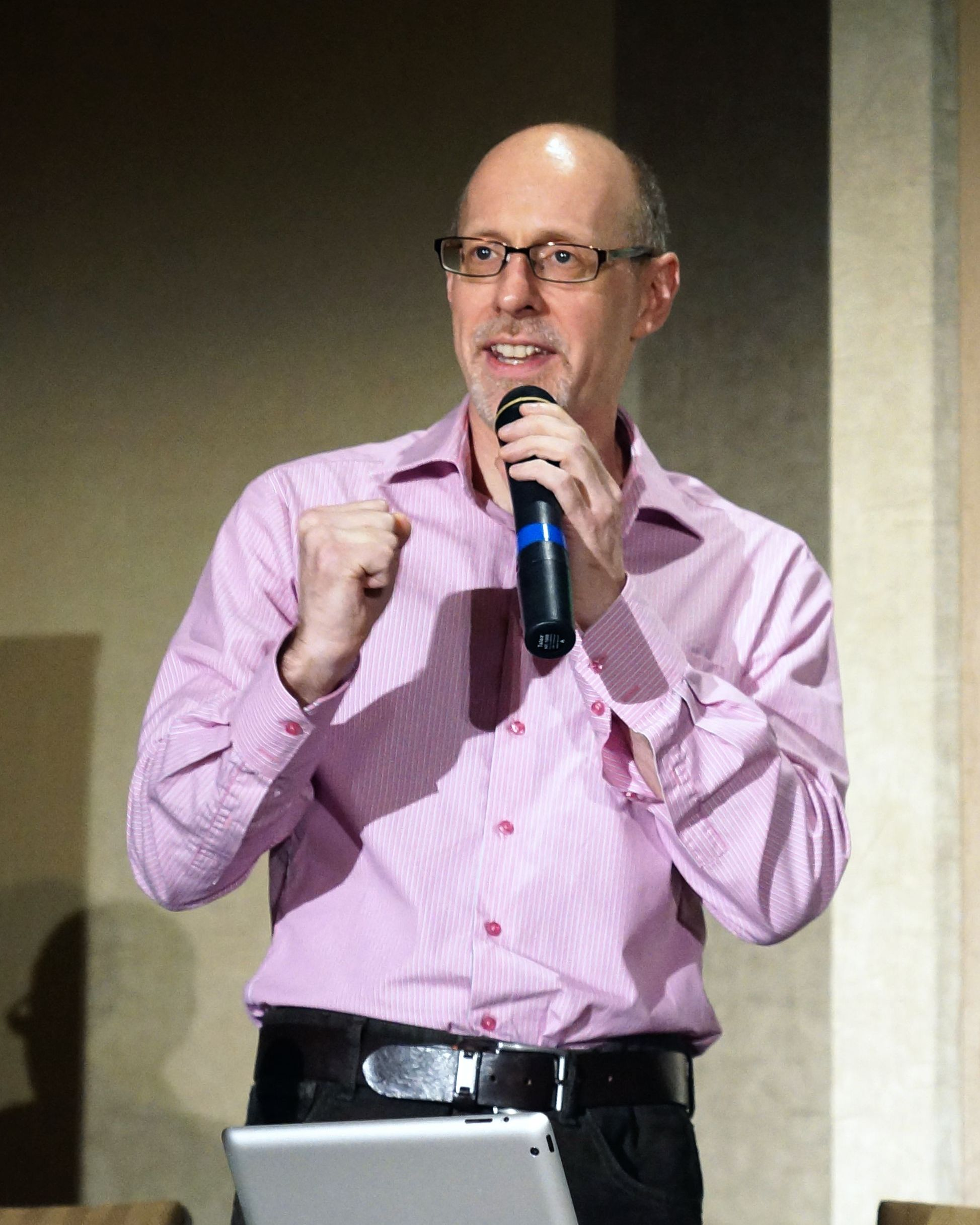
Wiseman opening CSICon 2012

== Publishing history ==
Paranormality was published in the United Kingdom in 2011 by Macmillan and in 2012 by S. Fischer Verlag (German). Wiseman was unable to find a publisher in the United States so readers had the option of downloading it as a Kindle book or getting it shipped by the publisher from the UK. According to Wiseman, he was unable to find a U.S. publisher because it wasn't considered "marketable" to the American reader. Because of competition in the e-book market, "It's a difficult time for publishers... they want a sure thing. The paranormal books that are selling well are the ones that say it's all true." Paranormality is "not sciency enough to be a hardcore science book... I think they are just very very nervous."

== Other ==
During the Fall 2011 semester, Paranormality was required reading for Michael Shermer's Chapman University class, "Skepticism 101: How to Think Like a Scientist (Without Being a Geek)". Students taking the course were asked to create a video using the information gained in the book. One such video, "How to be the Best Psychic in the World" was featured on the Skeptic Society's website as a curriculum resource.

Each year the Center for Inquiry selects a published work "that best exemplifies healthy skepticism, logical analysis, or empirical science" for the Robert P. Balles Annual Prize in Critical Thinking. In 2011, CSI awarded Wiseman $1,500 at the Nashville CSICon event in October 2012.
