= William Roy (disambiguation) =

William Roy (1726–1790) was a Scottish military engineer, surveyor, and antiquarian.

William Roy may also refer to:

- William Roy (medium) (1911–1977), notorious fraud medium in the history of British spiritualism
- William Roy (pole vaulter) (born 1914), American pole vaulter, 3rd at the 1935 USA Outdoor Track and Field Championships
- William R. Roy (1926–2014), United States representative from Kansas
- Bill Roy Jr. (born 1954), American member of the Kansas state legislature and son of William R. Roy
- William Burton Roy (born 1958), retired USAF officer and Olympian sport shooter
