= Great Amherst Mystery =

1870s poltergeist story

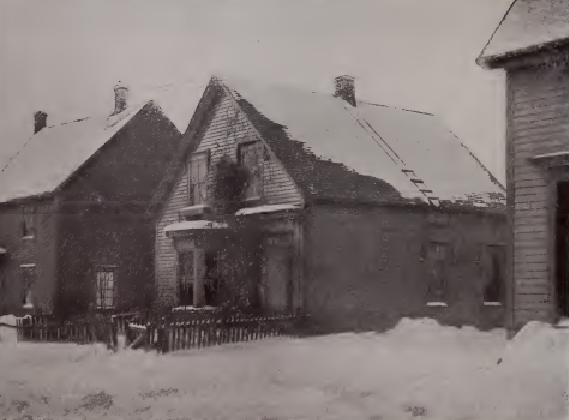
The house

The Great Amherst Mystery was a notorious case of reported poltergeist activity in Amherst, Nova Scotia, Canada between 1878 and 1879. It was the subject of an investigation by Walter Hubbell, an actor with an interest in psychic phenomena, who kept what he claimed was a diary of events in the house, later expanded into a popular book. The case was dismissed as a hoax by skeptical investigators.

== Events ==
The Amherst Mystery centred on Esther Cox, who lived in a house with her married sister Olive Teed, Olive's husband Daniel and their two young children. A brother and sister of Esther and Olive also lived in the house, as did Daniel's brother John Teed.

According to Hubbell's account, events began at the end of August 1878, after Esther Cox, then aged 18, was subjected to an attempted sexual assault by a male friend at gunpoint. This left her in great distress, and shortly after this the physical phenomena began. There were knockings, bangings and rustlings in the night, and Esther herself began to suffer seizures in which her body visibly swelled and she was feverish and chilled by turns. Then objects in the house took flight.

The frightened family called in a doctor. During his visit, bedclothes moved, scratching noises were heard and the words "Esther Cox, you are mine to kill" appeared on the wall by the head of Esther's bed. The following day the doctor administered sedatives to Esther to calm her and help her sleep, whereupon more noises and flying objects manifested themselves. Attempts to communicate with the "spirit" resulted in tapped responses to questions.

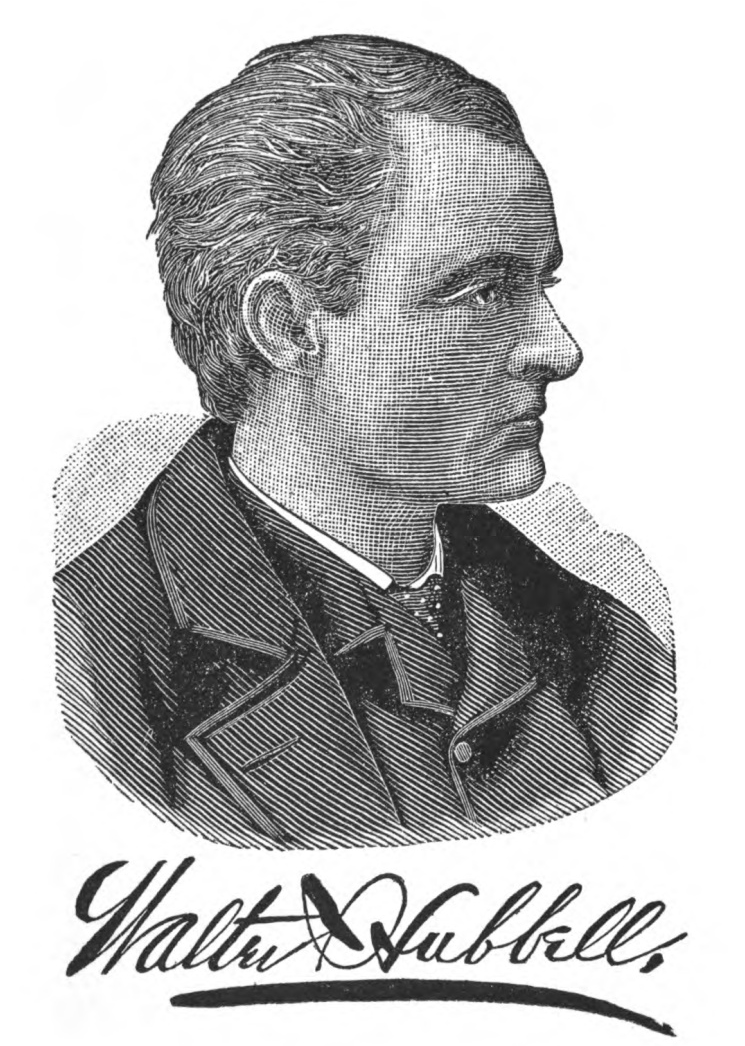
Walter Hubbell

The phenomena continued for some months, and became well known locally. Visitors to the cottage, including clergymen, heard banging and knocking and witnessed moving objects, often when Esther herself was under close observation. In December Esther fell ill with diphtheria. No phenomena were observed during the two weeks she spent in bed, nor during the time she spent recuperating afterwards at the home of a married sister in Sackville, New Brunswick. However, when she returned to Amherst the mysterious events began again, this time involving the outbreak of fires in various places in the house. Esther herself now claimed to see the "ghost", which threatened to burn the house down unless she left.

In January 1879 Esther moved in with another local family, but the manifestations around her continued and were witnessed by many people, some of whom conversed with the "ghost" by questioning and rapped answers. Some were curious and sympathetic; others believed Esther herself to be responsible for the phenomena, and she met with some hostility locally. Esther was frequently slapped, pricked and scratched by the "ghost", and on one occasion was stabbed in the back with a clasp knife. Interest in the case grew as the news spread, and in late March Esther spent some time in Saint John, New Brunswick, where she was investigated by some local gentlemen with an interest in science. By now, several distinct "spirits" were apparently associated with Esther and communicating with onlookers via knocks and rappings. "Bob Nickle", the original "ghost", claimed to have been a shoemaker in life, and others identified themselves as "Peter Cox", a relative of Esther's, and "Maggie Fisher". After the visit to Saint John, Esther spent some time with the Van Amberghs, friends with a peaceful farm near Amherst and then returned to the Teeds' cottage in the summer of 1879, whereupon the phenomena broke out again. It was at this point that Walter Hubbell arrived, attracted by the publicity surrounding the case, and moved into the Teed cottage as a lodger to investigate the phenomena.

Hubbell spent some weeks with Esther and her family, and reported having personally witnessed moving objects, fires and items appearing from nowhere and claimed that he saw phenomena occur even when Esther herself was in full view and obviously unconnected with them. He also claimed to have witnessed attacks on Esther with pins and other sharp objects, and to have seen her in several of her fits of extreme swelling and pain. He communicated with the various named "spirits" by rapping, and listed three others: "Mary Fisher", "Jane Nickle" and "Eliza McNeal", who were also manifesting themselves as part of events.

With Hubbell's professional help, Esther Cox embarked on a speaking tour, attracting audiences who paid to see her and hear her story. However, she met with some hostile reactions and, after she was heckled one night and a disturbance broke out, the attempt was abandoned. She returned to Amherst once more, working for a man named Arthur Davison, but after his barn burned down he accused her of arson and she was convicted and sentenced to four months in prison, although she was released after only one. After this, the phenomena ceased for good. Esther Cox subsequently married twice, having a son by each of her husbands. She moved to Brockton, Massachusetts with her second husband and died on 8 November 1912, aged 52.

== Aftermath ==
Hubbell's book was published in 1879 and proved popular, selling at least 55,000 copies. The Amherst case was also investigated by the British paranormal researcher Hereward Carrington, who took statements from surviving witnesses of the events in 1907 and published them, along with a detailed account of the case, in 1913. Other researchers looked at the case more critically than Hubbell: in particular, Dr. Walter F. Prince in the Proceedings of the American Society for Psychical Research (Vol XIII, 1919) made a detailed case for trickery by Esther Cox while in a dissociative state.

Prince noted that Esther's male friend who had attempted to rape her was Bob McNeal and the alleged poltergeist activities of "Bob Nickle" only began a week after the assault. Egon Larsen who summarized the evidence examined by Dr. Prince commented:

All the evidence collected by Dr. Prince seems to indicate that Esther was more than just unstable: that she was a psychopath suffering from symptoms of a split personality: that she herself, or rather part of her, played 'poltergeist': furthermore, that most so-called eyewitness accounts were of little scientific value; and that there was only one beneficiary of the whole fraud: Walter Hubbell... The most unreliable witness, naturally, is Hubbell himself; for what use would his book have been if it had not told of amazing occurrences? There is no corroboration by others of the incidents he claims to have observed, only his own sworn affidavit (reproduced on the cover of the 1888 edition) that he actually 'saw and heard the phenomena as stated'.

Larson also wrote that Hubbell's first edition of his book asserted that his story had been fully corroborated by the inhabitants of Amherst and from strangers from distant towns but there was no evidence for this because not a single statement was verified by any witness mentioned by name. Hubbell quoted from some newspapers but upon investigation these turned out to trace to Hubbell himself. Larson stated that Hubbell had embellished facts to make his book sell more copies and the book served as excellent publicity for his acting career. Larson also quoted a letter from Arthur Davison who admitted that Hubbell "painted the facts up to make the book sell".

== In popular culture ==
A play based on the story, Guilty! The Story of the Great Amherst Mystery, was written by Charlie Rhindress and premiered at Live Bait Theatre in Sackville, New Brunswick in 1991.

In 2012, former Cumberland County Museum Curator Laurie Glenn Norris authored a book further investigating the mystery entitled Haunted Girl: Esther Cox and the Great Amherst Mystery. In 2015, the book's publisher announced that it had sold the film rights for the book to a project led by director Larysa Kondracki.

In June 2026, the BBC podcast Uncanny: Cold Cases devoted an episode to The Great Amherst Mystery, including opinions and analysis by paranormal experts Evelyn Hollow and Dr Ciaran O'Keeffe.
