= Robert L. Morris =

American parapsychologist

Robert Morris
- Born: Robert Lyle Morris; July 9, 1942; Canonsburg, Pennsylvania
- Died: August 12, 2004 (aged 62); Edinburgh, Scotland
- Education: Duke University
- Scientific career
- Fields: Psychology; Parapsychology
- Workplaces: University of Edinburgh
- Doctoral students: Richard Wiseman; Caroline Watt

Robert Lyle Morris (July 9, 1942, in Canonsburg, Pennsylvania – August 12, 2004, in Edinburgh, Scotland) was an American psychologist, parapsychologist and professor at the University of Edinburgh, where he was the first holder of the Koestler Chair of Parapsychology at the Koestler Parapsychology Unit.

== Education ==
Morris received his doctorate from Duke University.

== Career and research ==
Morris was Koestler Professor of Parapsychology from December 1985 until his death in August 2004.

Morris was also known to have cooperated with the skeptic group Committee for Skeptical Inquiry. Morris co-wrote the book Guidelines for Testing Psychic Claimants (1995) with Wiseman, published by Prometheus Books.

Morris once commented in the New Scientist that "parapsychology is still a collection of half-baked explanations in search of phenomena to explain."

Richard Wiseman completed his PhD in psychology under the supervision of Morris in 1992.

=== Publications ===
- Some New Techniques in Animal Psi Research. Journal of Parapsychology 31 (December 1967).
- Obtaining Non-Random Entry Points: A Complex Psi Process. In Parapsychology Today. Edited by J. B. Rhine and R. Brier. New York: Citadel Press, 1968.
- The Psychobiology of Psi. In Psychic Exploration. Edited by E. D. Mitchell. New York: G. P. Putnam's Sons, 1974.
- Biology and Psychical Research. Edited by Gertrude R. Schmeidler. In Parapsychology: Its Relation to Physics, Biology Psychology, and Psychiatry. N.P. 1976.
- Parapsychology: A Biological Perspective. Edited by Benjamin Wolman. In Handbook of Parapsychology. New York: Van Nostrand Reinhold, 1977.
- Guidelines for Testing Psychic Claimants [with Richard Wiseman]. Amherst, N.Y.: Prometheus Books, 1995.
