= William Roy (medium) =

British fraud medium (1911–1977)

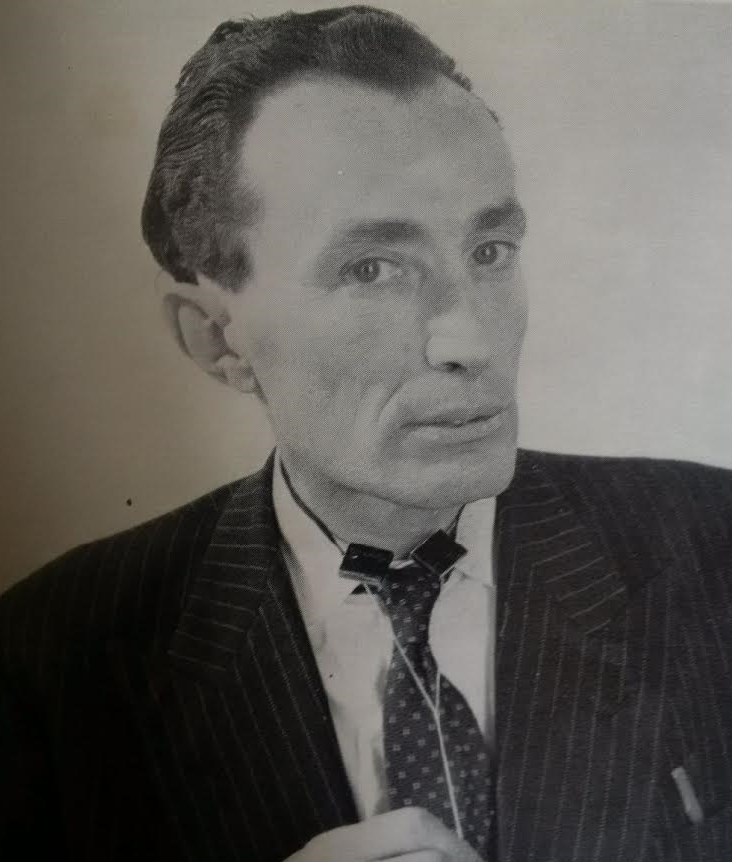
- Born: 1911
- Died: 1977 (aged 65–66)
- Occupation: Spiritualist medium

William Roy (1911-1977) was the pseudonym of William George Holroyd Plowright, a notorious fraudulent medium in the history of British spiritualism.

== Biography ==
Roy was born in Cobham, Surrey. He married Mary Castle, a nightclub owner, in London when he was seventeen years old. During the 1930s, his wife died and he remarried. He set up in business as a spiritualist medium. Roy's second wife, Dorothy, committed suicide. Three weeks after her death, Roy married Mary Rose Halligan. Roy had rich clients and lived in expensive style. He separated from his third wife in 1956.

Several small biographies have been written about Roy; these appear in Egon Larsen (1966), Simeon Edmunds (1966) and Melvin Harris (2003).

== Fraud ==
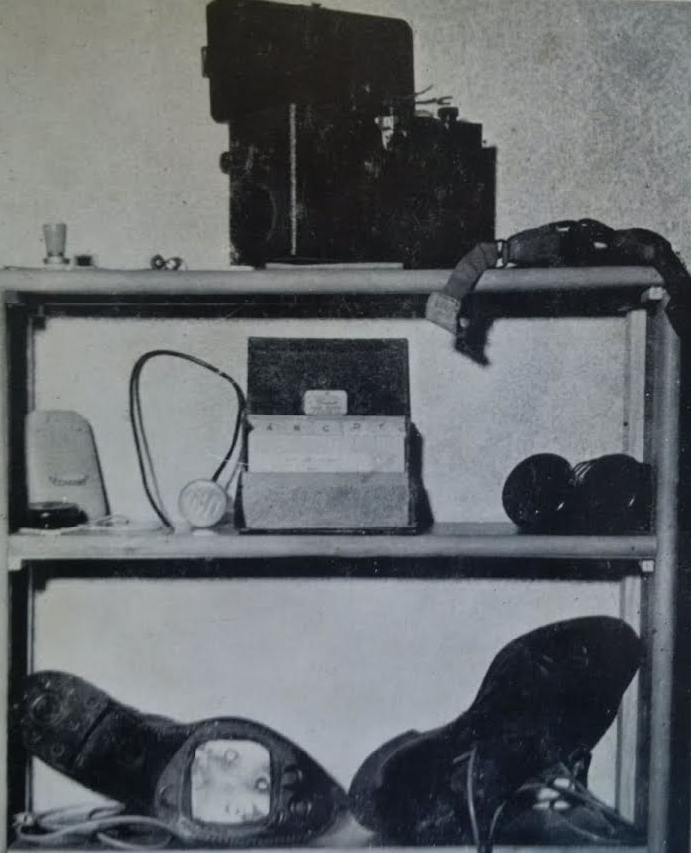
Fraudulent devices and electrical equipment that Roy utilized.

Roy used technical devices for his fraudulent mediumship and employed hidden accomplices. He concealed a microphone and recorded the conversations of the sitters before his séances. Roy was exposed as a fraud in 1955. According to Lewis Spence:

When people wrote to ask if they could attend his séances, Roy researched at the registry of births, deaths, and marriages in order to obtain detailed information about their relatives. When they visited his house for a sitting, they would be asked to leave their bags and coats outside the séance room. These were searched by a confederate for letters, tickets, bills, or other scraps of personal information. All the facts concerning sitters were recorded in a detailed card index system, and cleverly worked into Roy's "psychic" messages during séances.

His "direct voice" mediumship was a clever microphone relaying technique. The "spirit" voices were made in an adjoining room by his accomplice who spoke into a microphone or played tape recordings. The wires from the microphone ran through the wall and under the carpet of the séance room and attached to a hearing aid on Roy's wrist. The hearing aid had been adapted into a miniature speaker.

In 1958, Roy published his confessions on how he had tricked his séance sitters and issued photographs of the trick-apparatus that he had used in the Sunday Pictorial newspaper. These appeared in five installments, titled "A Shocking Confession of How William Roy Cheated His Way to Fame as a Spiritualist Medium".

He admitted that he had earned over £50,000 from his séance sitters. Despite his confessions Roy continued to operate as a fake medium under the name "Bill Silver" until his death.

Roy's apparatus for his fraudulent mediumship is now contained at Scotland Yard, in a museum at the Metropolitan Police Detective Training School.
