= Psychic staring effect =

Supposed phenomenon

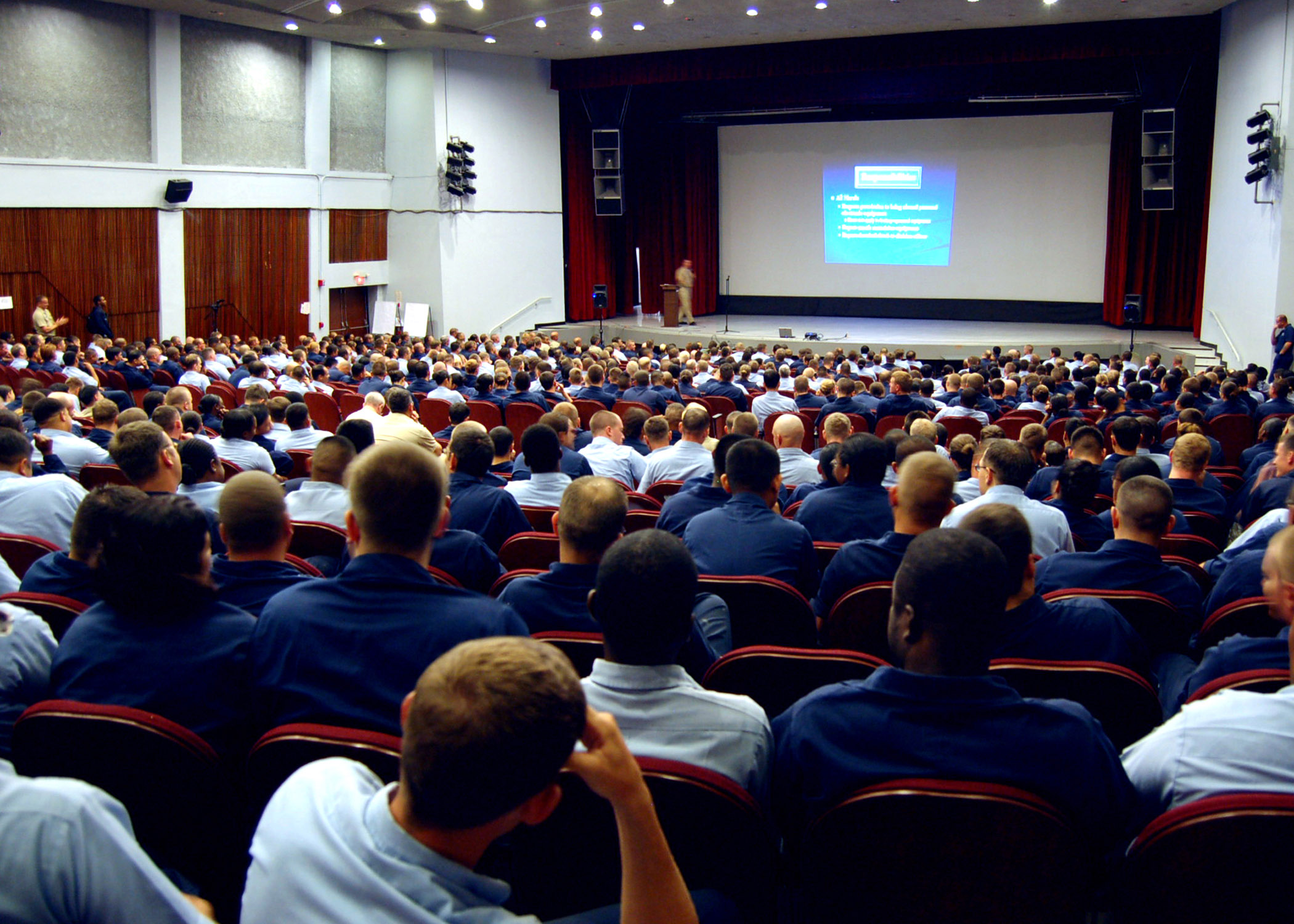
The "psychic staring effect" has been reported in crowded classrooms and lectures

The psychic staring effect (sometimes called scopaesthesia) is the claimed extrasensory ability of a person to detect being stared at. The idea was first explored by psychologist Edward B. Titchener in 1898 after students in his junior classes reported being able to "feel" when somebody was looking at them, even though they could not see this person. Titchener performed a series of laboratory experiments that found only negative results. The effect has been the subject of contemporary attention from parapsychologists and other researchers from the 1980s onwards, most notably Rupert Sheldrake.

The feeling is a common one, being reported by over two thirds of the students questioned in a 1913 study.

== Origin ==
Psychologist Edward B. Titchener reported in 1898 that some students in his junior classes believed that they could "feel" when they were being stared at from behind, and a smaller proportion believed that by staring at the back of a person's neck they could force them to turn around. Both phenomena were said to occur in public places such as classrooms and public halls. His students described the feeling as "a state of unpleasant tingling, which gathers in volume and intensity until a movement which shall relieve it becomes inevitable".

Titchener rejected the telepathic explanation. He instead suggested that when a subject experienced the feeling that they were being watched and turned to check, a second person who already had the subject in their field of vision might notice the subject starting to turn their head, and shift their gaze to the subject. From the subject's perspective, they have turned their head and can now see a person looking directly at them, from which they may incorrectly assume that the person had been staring at them all along. Titchener attributed the "tingling" effect to the subject focusing their attention on their own neck and the thought that somebody might be staring at it, observing that a person concentrating their attention on their own knee or foot will make that part of the body feel more sensitive. He conducted laboratory experiments with people who claimed to be able to sense the stares of others and those who claimed to be capable of "making people turn round", finding in both cases that the results were "invariably" negative.

== Later studies ==
A 1913 study by John E. Coover asked ten subjects to state whether or not they could sense an experimenter looking at them, over a period of 100 possible staring periods. The subjects' answers were correct 50.2% of the time, a result that Coover called an "astonishing approximation" of pure chance. Coover concluded that although the feeling of being stared at was common, experimentation showed it to be "groundless". He suggested that the "tingling" sensation described by Titchener was an example of motor automatism.

A 1983 experiment using closed-circuit television cameras to watch the subjects reported a 74% success rate, although later research suggested that the randomness of the sequences had not been controlled for. An attempt to recreate this study in 2009 used closed-circuit cameras and skin conductance monitoring to detect a reaction from the subjects, and required starers to play attention-demanding computer games when not staring at the subjects, in order to suppress any effects of thinking about the subjects while not looking at them. Subjects were required to indicate whenever they felt that they were being watched. The experiment "failed to demonstrate a clear-cut effect".

Parapsychologist Rupert Sheldrake carried out a number of experiments on the effect in the 2000s, and reported subjects exhibiting a weak sense of being stared at, but no sense of not being stared at. Sheldrake summarized his case in the Journal of Consciousness Studies, saying that he found a hit rate of 53.1%, with two subjects "nearly always right, scoring way above chance levels". Sheldrake's experiments were criticised for using sequences with "relatively few long runs and many alternations" instead of truly randomised patterns, which would have mirrored the natural patterns that people who guess and gamble would tend to follow and may have allowed subjects to learn the patterns implicitly. In 2005, Michael Shermer expressed concern over confirmation bias and experimenter bias in the tests, and concluded that Sheldrake's claim was unfalsifiable.

Writing after another skin conductance test in 2004 showed a negative result, Lobach & Bierman concluded that "the staring paradigm is not the easily replicable paradigm that it is claimed to be".

== Gaze detection ==
Various studies have explored the reliability with which humans can visually detect gazes from other individuals. It is theorized that the ability to precisely detect the target of a starer's gaze has conferred an evolutionary advantage by improving threat detection capabilities, as well as facilitating nonverbal communication. Compared to the eyes of other animals, the uniquely visible and well-defined sclera and iris of human eyes provides further evidence of its evolutionary importance for the species, and are thought to have developed as humans became more reliant upon complex communication for survival and reproductive success.

These mental processes occur subconsciously and utilize information from peripheral vision; this may contribute to the sensation that a "sixth sense" alerted the person being gazed upon.

== See also ==
- Evil eye
- Eye tracking
- Situation awareness
