= A Glorious Accident =

Documentary series (1993)

Een schitterend ongeluk (translated "A Glorious Accident" in English) was a 1993 documentary series featuring six prominent scientists and philosophers. Hosted by Wim Kayzer, a Dutch television producer, and filmed in seven parts, A Glorious Accident included interviews with Daniel Dennett, Freeman Dyson, Stephen Jay Gould, Oliver Sacks, Rupert Sheldrake, and Stephen Toulmin.

During six individual interviews with each guest and a final round table, the attendees discussed their vision of their work and the world with the central themes introduced by Kayzer: "How far did you come in your understanding of our thoughts and actions? What did science really bring us at the end of the 20th century: knowledge or also understanding?" "What is consciousness?" "What is memory?"

The roundtable discussion was filmed in the Netherlands. The film was released by VPRO and produced by Nellie Kamer and Wim Kayzer. The film broke viewing records in the Netherlands in 1993.

In the United States, A Glorious Accident was broadcast twice in June 1994 on PBS member station WNET. In September 1996, PBS member station KCET in Los Angeles also broadcast the series. The film was over 15 hours in length. The title phrase "glorious accident" is attributed to Stephen Jay Gould who referred to the asteroid-induced extinction of the dinosaurs which preceded the development of humanity.

== Book ==
Together with the series, a book with the same title containing the text from the interviews was also published in the Netherlands in 1993. It was a number one bestseller in the Netherlands for several months. The publisher summary reads:

Transcripts of six interviews and a group discussion [...] with six leading contemporary scientists from various disciplines on the possibilities and limitations of (scientific) intelligence.

In 1997, a book titled A Glorious Accident: Understanding Our Place in the Cosmic Puzzle was also published in English.
