= Rupert Sheldrake =

English author and parapsychological researcher (born 1942)

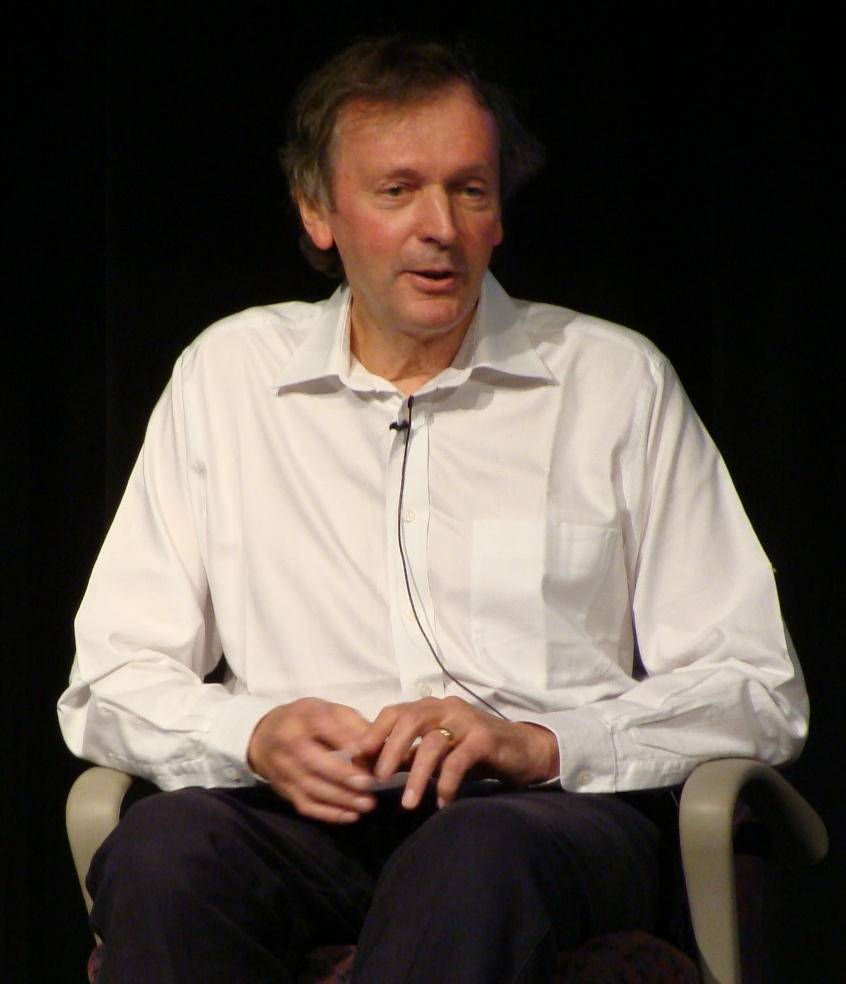
- Sheldrake in 2008
- Born: 28 June 1942 (age 84); Newark-on-Trent, Nottinghamshire, England
- Education: Clare College, Cambridge (MA); Harvard University; University of Cambridge (PhD)
- Occupations: Researcher, author, critic
- Employer: The Perrott-Warrick Fund (2005–2010)
- Spouse: Jill Purce
- Children: Cosmo Sheldrake; Merlin Sheldrake
- Website: sheldrake.org

Alfred Rupert Sheldrake (born 28 June 1942) is an English author and parapsychology researcher. He proposed the concept of morphic resonance, a conjecture that lacks mainstream acceptance and has been widely criticized as pseudoscience. He has worked as a biochemist at Cambridge University, a Harvard scholar, a researcher at the Royal Society, and a plant physiologist for ICRISAT in India.

Other work by Sheldrake encompasses paranormal subjects such as precognition, empirical research into telepathy, and the psychic staring effect. He has been described as a New Age author.

Sheldrake's morphic resonance posits that "memory is inherent in nature" and that "natural systems ... inherit a collective memory from all previous things of their kind." Sheldrake proposes that it is also responsible for "telepathy-type interconnections between organisms." His advocacy of the idea offers idiosyncratic explanations of standard subjects in biology such as development, inheritance, and memory.

Critics cite a lack of evidence for morphic resonance and inconsistencies between its tenets and data from genetics, embryology, neuroscience, and biochemistry. They also express concern that popular attention paid to Sheldrake's books and public appearances undermines the public's understanding of science. (Note: Sources: pseudoscience; lack of evidence; inconsistency with data from genetics and embryology; inconsistency with consensus in neuroscience and biochemistry; undermines the public's understanding of science)

== Early life and education ==
Sheldrake was born on 28 June 1942, in Newark-on-Trent, Nottinghamshire, to Reginald Sheldrake and Doris (née Tebbutt). His father was a University of Nottingham-educated pharmacist who ran a chemist's shop down the street from where Rupert's grandparents had a wallpaper shop. Sheldrake credits his father (an amateur naturalist and microscopist) with supporting his interests in zoology and botany.

Although his parents were Methodists, they sent him to Worksop College, an Anglican boarding school. Sheldrake has said:

I went through the standard scientific atheist phase when I was about 14 ... I bought into that package deal of science equals atheism. I was the only boy at my high Anglican boarding school who refused to get confirmed.

In the nine-month period before starting college, Sheldrake worked at the Parke-Davis pharmacology research lab in London, an experience he described as formative due to the required destruction of lab animals, which he found deeply unsettling. At Clare College, Cambridge, Sheldrake studied biology and biochemistry. In 1964, he was awarded a fellowship to study the philosophy and history of science at Harvard University. After a year at Harvard, he returned to Cambridge, where he earned a PhD in biochemistry in 1968 for his work in plant development and plant hormones.

== Career ==
After obtaining his PhD, Sheldrake became a fellow of Clare College, working in biochemistry and cell biology with funding from the Royal Society Rosenheim Research Fellowship. He investigated auxins, a class of plant hormone that plays a role in plant vascular cell differentiation. Sheldrake and Philip Rubery developed the chemiosmotic model of polar auxin transport.

Sheldrake has said that he ended this line of research when he concluded:

The system is circular. It does not explain how [differentiation is] established to start with. After nine years of intensive study, it became clear to me that biochemistry would not solve the problem of why things have the basic shape they do.

From 1968 to 1969, Sheldrake worked at the University of Malaya.

Having an interest in Indian philosophy, Hinduism and transcendental meditation, Sheldrake resigned his position at Clare and went to work on the physiology of tropical crops in Hyderabad, India, as principal plant physiologist at the International Crops Research Institute for the Semi-Arid Tropics (ICRISAT) from 1974 to 1978. There he published on crop physiology and co-authored a book on the anatomy of the pigeonpea.

Sheldrake left ICRISAT to focus on writing A New Science of Life, during which time he spent a year and a half in the Saccidananda Ashram of Bede Griffiths, a Benedictine monk active in interfaith dialogue with Hinduism. Published in 1981, the book outlines his concept of morphic resonance, of which he has said:

The idea came to me in a moment of insight and was extremely exciting. It interested some of my colleagues at Clare College—philosophers, linguists, and classicists were quite open-minded. But the idea of mysterious telepathy-type interconnections between organisms and of collective memories within species didn't go down too well with my colleagues in the science labs. Not that they were aggressively hostile; they just made fun of it.

After writing A New Science of Life, he continued at ICRISAT as a part-time consultant physiologist until 1985.

Sheldrake published his second book, The Presence of the Past, in 1988. In the 1990s and 2000s, he continued to publish books, which included several joint discussions with Ralph Abraham, a mathematician, and Terence McKenna, an ethnobotanist and philosopher. Sheldrake also collaborated with Matthew Fox, a priest and theologian, on two books in 1996.

Sheldrake was one of six subjects, along with Oliver Sacks, Daniel Dennett, Stephen Jay Gould, Freeman Dyson, Stephen Toulmin, who were covered in 1993 by the Dutch filmmaker Wim Kayzer in A Glorious Accident, a documentary series that posed a series of questions about consciousness and culminated in a roundtable discussion between the participants. The film was shown on Dutch public broadcasting system VPRO in 1993, followed by United States PBS member station WNET in 1994. The book A Glorious Accident: Understanding Our Place in the Cosmic Puzzle was produced from the transcripts of the program and published in both Dutch and English.

Since 2004, Sheldrake has been a visiting professor at the Graduate Institute in Bethany, Connecticut, where he was also academic director of the Holistic Learning and Thinking Program until 2012. From September 2005 until 2010, Sheldrake was director of the Perrott–Warrick Project for psychical research for research on unexplained human and animal abilities, funded from Trinity College, Cambridge. As of 2014, he was a fellow of the Institute of Noetic Sciences in California and a fellow of Schumacher College in Devon, England. Since 2014, he has been a fellow of the Temenos Academy, London.

In 2017, Sheldrake published a dialog with science writer and skeptic Michael Shermer titled Arguing Science: A Dialogue on the Future of Science and Spirit. In 2023, at the How The Light Gets In festival of philosophy in Hay-on-Wye, UK, Sheldrake debated Shermer. In 2023, Sheldrake debated the existence of consciousness outside of brains at the University Aula in Bergen, Norway, alongside anthropologist Tanya Luhrmann and neuroscientist Anil Seth.

Sheldrake has outlined his spiritual practices in two books: Science and Spiritual Practices (2017) and Ways to Go Beyond and Why They Work (2019).

== Selected books ==
Reviews of Sheldrake's books have at times been extremely negative about their scientific content, but some have been positive. In 2009, Adam Rutherford, geneticist and deputy editor of Nature, criticised Sheldrake's books for containing research that was not subjected to the peer-review process expected for science, and suggested that his books were best "ignored."

=== A New Science of Life (1981) ===
Sheldrake's A New Science of Life: The Hypothesis of Morphic Resonance (1981) proposes that through morphic resonance, various perceived phenomena, particularly biological ones, become more probable the more often they occur, and that biological growth and behaviour thus become guided into patterns laid down by previous similar events. As a result, he suggests, newly acquired behaviours can be passed down to future generations—a biological proposition akin to the Lamarckian inheritance theory. He generalises this approach to assert that it explains many aspects of science, from evolution to the laws of nature, which, in Sheldrake's formulation, are merely mutable habits that have been evolving and changing since the Big Bang.

John Davy wrote in The Observer that the implications of A New Science of Life were "fascinating and far-reaching, and would turn upside down a lot of orthodox science," and that they would "merit attention if some of its predictions are supported by experiment."

In subsequent books, Sheldrake continued to promote morphic resonance.

The morphic resonance hypothesis is rejected by numerous critics on many grounds, and has been labelled pseudoscience and magical thinking. These grounds include the lack of evidence for it and its inconsistency with established scientific theories. The idea of morphic resonance is also seen as lacking scientific credibility because it is overly vague and unfalsifiable. Sheldrake's experimental methods have been criticised for being poorly designed and subject to experimenter bias. His analyses of results have also drawn criticism. (Note: Sources: pseudoscience; magical thinking; lack of evidence; inconsistency with established scientific theories; overly vague; unfalsifiable; experimental methods poorly designed and subject to experimenter bias; analyses of results have also drawn criticism)

Alex Gomez-Marin denies that Sheldrake's basic idea is unfalsifiable, but no conclusive experiments have been performed since mainstream scientists do not wish to get involved in such experiments.

=== The Presence of the Past (1988) ===
In The Presence of the Past: Morphic Resonance and the Habits of Nature (1988), Sheldrake expands on his morphic resonance hypothesis and marshals experimental evidence that he says supports it. The book was reviewed favourably in New Scientist by historian Theodore Roszak, who called it "engaging, provocative" and "a tour de force." When it was reissued in 2011 with those quotes on the front cover, New Scientist remarked, "Back then, Roszak gave Sheldrake the benefit of the doubt. Today, attitudes have hardened and Sheldrake is seen as standing firmly on the wilder shores of science," adding that if New Scientist were to review the reissue, the book's publisher "wouldn't be mining it for promotional purposes."

In a 1988 review of the book in The Times, David E. H. Jones criticised the hypothesis as magical thinking and pseudoscience, saying that morphic resonance "is so vast and formless that it could easily be made to explain anything, or to dodge round any opposing argument ... Sheldrake has sadly aligned himself with those fantasists who, from the depths of their armchairs, dream up whole new grandiose theories of space and time to revolutionize all science, drape their woolly generalizations over every phenomenon they can think of, and then start looking round for whatever scraps of evidence that seem to them to be in their favour." Jones argued that without confirmatory experimental evidence, "the whole unwieldy and redundant structure of [Sheldrake's] theory falls to Occam's Razor."

=== The Rebirth of Nature (1991) ===
Published in 1991, Sheldrake's The Rebirth of Nature: The Greening of Science and God addresses the subject of New Age consciousness and related topics. A column in The Guardian said that the book "seeks to restore the pre-Enlightenment notion that nature is 'alive'," quoting Sheldrake as saying that "indeterminism, spontaneity and creativity have re-emerged throughout the natural world" and that "mystic, animistic and religious ways of thinking can no longer be kept at bay". The book was reviewed by James Lovelock in Nature, who argued that "the theory of formative causation makes testable predictions," noting that "nothing has yet been reported which would divert the mainstream of science. ... Even if it is nonsense ... recognizing the need for fruitful errors, I do not regard the book as dangerous."

=== Seven Experiments That Could Change the World (1994) ===
In 1994, Sheldrake proposed a list of Seven Experiments That Could Change the World, subtitled "A do-it-yourself guide to revolutionary science." He encouraged laypeople to conduct research and argued that experiments similar to his own could be conducted with limited expense.

The Sunday Times music critic Mark Edwards reviewed the book favourably, writing that Sheldrake "challenges the complacent certainty of scientists" and that his ideas "sounded ridiculous ... as long as your thinking is constrained by the current scientific orthodoxy".

In The Lancet, David Sharp wrote that the experiments testing paranormal phenomena carried the "risk of positive publication bias" and that the scientific community "would have to think again if some of these suggestions were convincingly confirmed". He encouraged medical professionals to "at least read Sheldrake, even try one of his experiments—but pay very close attention to your methods section". Sharp doubted whether "a bunch of enthusiastic amateurs [was] going to persuade sceptics", adding, "orthodox science will need a lot of convincing".

In The Times, Science journalist Nigel Hawkes wrote that Sheldrake was "trying to bridge the gap between phenomenalism and science" and suggested that dogs could appear to have psychic abilities when they were actually relying on more conventional senses. He concluded: "whether scientists will be willing to take [Sheldrake] seriously is ... [a question] that need not concern most readers. While I do not think this book will change the world, it will cause plenty of harmless fun."

=== Dogs That Know When Their Owners Are Coming Home (1999) ===
Sheldrake's Dogs That Know When Their Owners Are Coming Home covers his research into proposed telepathy between humans and animals, particularly dogs. Sheldrake suggests that such interspecies telepathy is real and that morphic fields are responsible for it.

The book is in three sections, on telepathy, on sense of direction, including animal migration and the homing of pigeons, and on animal precognition, including premonitions of earthquakes and tsunamis. Sheldrake examined more than 1,000 case histories of dogs and cats that seemed to anticipate their owners' return by waiting at a door or window, sometimes for half an hour or more ahead of their return. He did a long series of experiments with a dog called Jaytee, in which the dog was filmed continuously during its owner's absence. In 100 filmed tests, on average Jaytee spent far more time at the window when its owner was on her way home than when she was not. During the main period of her absence, before she started her return journey, Jaytee was at the window for an average of 24 seconds per 10-minute period (4% of the time), whereas when she was on her way home, during the first ten minutes of her homeward journey, from more than five miles away, Jaytee was at the window for an average of five minutes 30 seconds (55% of the time). Sheldrake interpreted the result as highly significant statistically. He performed 12 more tests, in which Jaytee's owner travelled home in a taxi or other unfamiliar vehicle at randomly selected times communicated to her by telephone, to rule out the possibility that the dog was reacting to familiar car sounds or routines. He also carried out similar experiments with another dog, Kane, describing the results as similarly positive and significant.

Before the publication of Dogs That Know When Their Owners Are Coming Home, Sheldrake invited Richard Wiseman, Matthew Smith, and Julie Milton to conduct an independent experimental study with Jaytee. They concluded that their evidence did not support telepathy as an explanation for the dog's behaviour, and proposed possible alternative explanations for Sheldrake's conclusions, involving artefacts, bias resulting from experimental design, and post hoc analysis of unpublished data. The group said that Sheldrake's observed patterns could easily arise if a dog were simply to do very little for a while before visiting a window with increasing frequency the longer its owner was absent. Such behaviour makes sense for a dog awaiting its owner's return, and the final measurement period, ending with the owner's return, would always contain the most time at the window. Sheldrake argued that the actual data in his own and in Wiseman's tests did not bear this out, and that Jaytee went to wait at the window sooner when his owner was returning from a short absence, and later after a long absence, with no tendency to go to the window early in the way he did for shorter absences.

Reviewing the book, Susan Blackmore criticised Sheldrake for comparing the 12 tests of random duration—which were all less than an hour long—to the initial tests where the dog may have been responding to patterns in the owner's journeys. Blackmore interpreted the results of the randomised tests as starting with a period where the dog "settles down and does not bother to go to the window" and then showing that the longer the owner was away, the more the dog went to look.

=== The Sense of Being Stared At (2003) ===
Sheldrake's The Sense of Being Stared At explores telepathy, precognition, and the "psychic staring effect". It describes an experiment Sheldrake conducted where blindfolded subjects guessed whether persons were staring at them or at another target. He reported subjects exhibiting a weak sense of being stared at, but no sense of not being stared at, and attributed the results to morphic resonance. He reported a hit rate of 53.1%, describing two subjects as "nearly always right, scoring way above chance levels".

Several independent experimenters were unable to find evidence beyond statistical randomness that people could tell they were being stared at, with some saying that Sheldrake's experiments had design flaws, such as using test sequences with "relatively few long runs and many alternations" instead of truly randomised patterns. In 2005, Michael Shermer expressed concern over confirmation bias and experimenter bias in the tests, and concluded that Sheldrake's claim was unfalsifiable.

David Jay Brown, who conducted some of the experiments for Sheldrake, said that one of the subjects who was reported to have the highest hit rates was under the influence of the drug MDMA (Ecstasy) during the trials.

=== The Science Delusion (Science Set Free) (2012) ===
The Science Delusion, published in the US as Science Set Free: 10 Paths to New Discovery, summarises much of Sheldrake's previous work and encapsulates it into a broader critique of philosophical materialism, with the title apparently mimicking that of The God Delusion by one of his critics, Richard Dawkins.

In the book, Sheldrake asks a number of questions to elaborate on his central premise that science is predicated on the belief that the nature of reality is fully understood, with only minor details needing to be filled in. This "delusion" is what Sheldrake argues has turned science into a series of dogmas grounded in philosophical materialism rather than an open-minded approach to investigating phenomena. He argues that many powerful taboos circumscribe what scientists may study. The mainstream view of modern science is that it proceeds by methodological naturalism and does not require philosophical materialism.

Sheldrake questions conservation of energy, calling it "standard scientific dogma"; says that perpetual motion devices and inedia should be investigated as possible phenomena; and says "the evidence for energy conservation in living organisms is weak". He argues in favour of alternative medicine and psychic phenomena, saying that a "scientific priesthood" with an "authoritarian mentality" has impeded their recognition as legitimate. Citing his earlier "psychic staring effect" experiments and other reasons, he says that minds are not confined to brains and that "liberating minds from confinement in heads is like being released from prison". He suggests that DNA is insufficient to explain heredity and that inheritance of form and behaviour is mediated through morphic resonance. He also promotes morphic resonance more broadly to explain other phenomena, such as memory.

Reviews were mixed. In The Guardian, anti-reductionist philosopher Mary Midgley welcomed the book as "a new mind-body paradigm" to address what she called "the unlucky fact that our current form of mechanistic materialism rests on muddled, outdated notions of matter." In The Times Higher Education Supplement, Philosopher Martin Cohen, a critic of esotericism in science, wrote, "There is a lot to be said for debunking orthodox science's pretensions to be on the verge of fitting the last grain of information into its towering edifice of universal knowledge" but that Sheldrake "goes a bit too far here and there, as in promoting his morphic resonance theory".

In The Sunday Times, Bryan Appleyard wrote that Sheldrake is "at his most incisive" when making a "broad critique of contemporary science" and "scientism" but that "morphic resonance is widely derided and narrowly supported. Most of the experimental evidence is contested, though Sheldrake argues there are 'statistically significant' results." Appleyard called it "highly speculative" and was unsure "whether it makes sense".

Other reviews were less favourable. New Scientist's deputy editor Graham Lawton called Science Set Free "woolly credulousness" and chided Sheldrake for "uncritically embracing all kinds of fringe ideas". A review in Philosophy Now called the book "disturbingly eccentric", combining "a disorderly collage of scientific fact and opinion with an intrusive yet disjunctive metaphysical programme".

=== Science and Spiritual Practices (2017) ===
Reviews of Science and Spiritual Practices were mostly positive. Kirkus Reviews called it a "grounded and inspiring approach to appreciating the benefits of both science and religion". In the Church Times, Adam Ford called it a "useful and very clear introduction to the practice of meditation" combined with a how-to guide on the "healing and happiness-creating power of gratitude".

Publishers Weekly wrote that the book has "accessible suggestions" and "clear arguments" and that "a few fuzzy moments, including reliance on many...overly speculative accounts" do not prevent it from being "otherwise convincing" and "a good case for reincorporating bygone spiritual habits".

=== Ways to Go Beyond and Why They Work (2019) ===
Reviews of Ways to Go Beyond and Why They Work were mixed. In The Daily Telegraph, journalist Steven Poole called Sheldrake's writing "very engaging" and said his defense of prayer worked "sometimes, but not always" and was "not really good enough". In Literary Review, veterinary surgeon and barrister Charles A. Foster called the book "a very mixed bag" but also "funny, wise, [and] full of whimsical weirdness".

In the Times Literary Supplement, anthropologist Jonathan Benthall called the book "an affable, erudite manual to show how life need not be boring" and Sheldrake's arguments "soft at the edges, sometimes presenting his hypotheses as facts".

== Public reception ==
Sheldrake's ideas have been discussed in academic journals and books. His work has also received popular coverage through newspapers, radio, television, and speaking engagements. The attention he receives has raised concern that it adversely affects the public understanding of science. Some have accused Sheldrake of self-promotion, with Steven Rose commenting, "for the inventors of such hypotheses the rewards include a degree of instant fame which is harder to achieve by the humdrum pursuit of more conventional science."

=== Academic debate ===
A variety of responses to Sheldrake's ideas have appeared in prominent scientific publications.

In 1982, Sheldrake and theoretical physicist David Bohm published a dialogue in which they compared Sheldrake's ideas to Bohm's implicate order. In 1997, physicist Hans-Peter Dürr speculated about Sheldrake's work in relation to modern physics.

After the publication of A New Science of Life, New Scientist sponsored a competition to devise empirical tests for morphic resonance. The winning idea involved learning Turkish nursery rhymes, with psychologist and broadcaster Sue Blackmore's entry involving babies' behaviour coming second. Blackmore found the results did not support morphic resonance.

In 2005, the Journal of Consciousness Studies devoted a special issue to Sheldrake's work on the sense of being stared at. In the issue, the editor could not follow the journal's standard peer-review process because "making successful blind peer review a condition of publication would in this case have killed the project at the outset". The issue thus featured several articles by Sheldrake, followed by the open peer review, to which Sheldrake then responded. Michael Shermer rated the peer commentaries in Scientific American and said the more supportive reviews came from those who had affiliations with less mainstream institutions.

Sheldrake denies that DNA contains a recipe for morphological development. He and developmental biologist Lewis Wolpert have made a scientific wager about the importance of DNA in the developing organism. Wolpert bet Sheldrake "a case of fine port" that "By 1 May 2029, given the genome of a fertilised egg of an animal or plant, we will be able to predict in at least one case all the details of the organism that develops from it, including any abnormalities." The Royal Society will be asked to determine the winner if the result is not obvious.

==== "A book for burning?" ====
In September 1981, Nature's senior editor, John Maddox, published an editorial about A New Science of Life titled "A book for burning?" It commented:

Sheldrake's book is a splendid illustration of the widespread public misconception of what science is about. In reality, Sheldrake's argument is in no sense a scientific argument but is an exercise in pseudo-science ... Many readers will be left with the impression that Sheldrake has succeeded in finding a place for magic within scientific discussion—and this, indeed, may have been a part of the objective of writing such a book.

Maddox argued that Sheldrake's hypothesis was not testable or "falsifiable in Popper's sense", referring to the philosopher Karl Popper. He said Sheldrake's proposals for testing his hypothesis were "time-consuming, inconclusive in the sense that it will always be possible to account for another morphogenetic field and impractical." Maddox rejected the suggestion that the book should be burned, but his piece's title garnered widespread publicity. Nature later published several letters disapproving of the editorial, including one from physicist Brian Josephson, who criticised Maddox for "a failure to admit even the possibility that genuine physical facts may exist which lie outside the scope of current scientific descriptions".

In 1983, an editorial in The Guardian compared the "petulance of wrath of the scientific establishment" aimed against Sheldrake with the Galileo affair and Lysenkoism. Responding in the same paper, Brian Charlesworth defended the scientific establishment, affirming that "the ultimate test of a scientific theory is its conformity with the observations and experiments" and that "vitalistic and Lamarckian ideas which [The Guardian] seem to regard so highly have repeatedly failed this test."

In a letter to The Guardian in 1988, a scientist from Glasgow University referred to the title "A book for burning?" as "posing the question to attract attention" and criticised the "perpetuation of the myth that Maddox ever advocated the burning of Sheldrake's book." In 1999, Maddox characterised his 1981 editorial as "injudicious," saying that even though it concluded that Sheldrake's book

should not be burned ... but put firmly in its place among the literature of intellectual aberration. ... The publicists for Sheldrake's publishers were nevertheless delighted with the piece, using it to suggest that the Establishment (Nature) was again up to its old trick of suppressing uncomfortable truths.

An editor for Nature said in 2009 that Maddox's reference to book burning backfired.

In 2012, Sheldrake described his time after Maddox's review as being "exactly like a papal excommunication. From that moment on, I became a very dangerous person to know for scientists."

==== Sheldrake and Steven Rose ====
During 1987 and 1988 Sheldrake contributed several pieces to The Guardian's "Body and Soul" column. In one of these, he wrote that the idea that "memories were stored in our brains" was "only a theory" and "despite decades of research, the phenomenon of memory remains mysterious." This provoked a response by Steven Rose, a neuroscientist from the Open University, who criticised Sheldrake for being "a researcher trained in another discipline" (botany) for not "respect[ing] the data collected by neuroscientists before begin[ning] to offer us alternative explanations," and accused Sheldrake of "ignoring or denying" "massive evidence," and arguing that "neuroscience over the past two decades has shown that memories are stored in specific changes in brain cells." Giving an example of experiments on chicks, Rose asserted "egregious errors that Sheldrake makes to bolster his case that demands a new vague but all-embracing theory to resolve."

Sheldrake responded to Rose's article, stating that there was experimental evidence that showed that "memories can survive the destruction of the putative memory traces." Rose responded, asking Sheldrake to "get his facts straight," explaining the research and concluding that "there is no way that this straightforward and impressive body of evidence can be taken to imply that memories are not in the brain, still less that the brain is tuning into some indeterminate, undefined, resonating and extra-corporeal field."

In his next column, Sheldrake again attacked Rose for following "materialism," and argued that quantum physics had "overturned" materialism, and suggested that "memories may turn out to depend on morphic resonance rather than memory traces." Philosopher Alan Malachowski of the University of East Anglia, responding to what he called Sheldrake's "latest muddled diatribe," defended materialism, argued that Sheldrake dismissed Rose's explanation with an "absurd rhetorical comparison," asserted that quantum physics was compatible with materialism, and argued that "being roughly right about great many things has given [materialists] the confidence to be far more open minded than he is prepared to give them credit for."

In 1990, Sheldrake and Rose agreed to and arranged a test of the morphic resonance hypothesis using chicks. They were unable to agree on the intended joint research paper reporting their results, instead publishing separate and conflicting interpretations. Sheldrake published a paper stating that the results matched his prediction that day-old chicks would be influenced by the experiences of previous batches of day-old chicks—"From the point of view of the hypothesis of formative causation, the results of this experiment are encouraging"—and called for further research. Rose wrote that morphic resonance was a "hypothesis disconfirmed." He also made further criticisms of morphic resonance, and stated that "the experience of this collaboration has convinced me in practice, Sheldrake is so committed to his hypothesis that it is very hard to envisage the circumstances in which he would accept its disconfirmation." Rose asked Patrick Bateson to analyse the data, and Bateson offered his opinion that Sheldrake's interpretation of the data was "misleading" and attributable to experimenter effects.

Sheldrake responded to Rose's paper by describing it as "polemic" and "aggressive tone and extravagant rhetoric" and concluding: "The results of this experiment do not disconfirm the hypothesis of formative causation, as Rose claims. They are consistent with it."

=== On television ===
Sheldrake was the subject of an episode of Heretics of Science, a six-part documentary series broadcast on BBC2 in 1994. In this episode, John Maddox discussed "A book for burning?," his 1981 Nature editorial review of Sheldrake's book, A New Science of Life: The Hypothesis of Morphic Resonance. Maddox said that morphic resonance "is not a scientific theory. Sheldrake is putting forward magic instead of science, and that can be condemned with exactly the language that the popes used to condemn Galileo, and for the same reasons: it is heresy." The broadcast repeatedly displayed footage of book burning, sometimes accompanied by audio of a crowd chanting "heretic." Biologist Steven Rose criticised the broadcast for focusing on Maddox's rhetoric as if it was "all that mattered." "There wasn't much sense of the scientific or metascientific issues at stake," Rose said.

An experiment involving measuring the time for subjects to recognise hidden images, with morphic resonance being posited to aid in recognition, was conducted in 1984 by the BBC popular science programme Tomorrow's World. In the outcome of the experiment, one set of data yielded positive results and another set yielded negative results.

=== Public debates and lectures ===
Sheldrake debated with biologist Lewis Wolpert on the existence of telepathy in 2004 at the Royal Society of Arts in London. Sheldrake argued for telepathy while Wolpert argued that telepathy fits Irving Langmuir's definition of pathological science and that the evidence for telepathy has not been persuasive. Reporting on the event, New Scientist said "it was clear the audience saw Wolpert as no more than a killjoy. (...) There are sound reasons for doubting Sheldrake's data. One is that some parapsychology experimenters have an uncanny knack of finding the effect they are looking for. There is no suggestion of fraud, but something is going on, and science demands that it must be understood before conclusions can be drawn about the results."

In 2006, Sheldrake spoke at a meeting of the British Association for the Advancement of Science about experimental results on telepathy replicated by "a 1980s girl band," drawing criticism from Peter Atkins, Lord Winston, and Richard Wiseman. The Royal Society also reacted to the event, saying, "Modern science is based on a rigorous evidence-based process involving experiment and observation. The results and interpretations should always be exposed to robust peer review."

In April 2008, Sheldrake was stabbed by a man during a lecture in Santa Fe, New Mexico. The man told a reporter that he thought Sheldrake had been using him as a "guinea pig" in telepathic mind control experiments for over five years. Sheldrake suffered a wound to the leg and has recovered, while his assailant was found "guilty but mentally ill."

In January 2013, Sheldrake gave a TEDx lecture at TEDxWhitechapel in East London roughly summarising ideas from his book, The Science Delusion. In his talk, he said that modern science rests on ten dogmas that "fall apart" upon examination and promoted his hypothesis of morphic resonance. According to a statement by TED staff, TED's scientific advisors "questioned whether his list is a fair description of scientific assumptions" and believed that "there is little evidence for some of Sheldrake's more radical claims, such as his theory of morphic resonance." The advisors recommended that the talk "not be distributed without being framed with caution." The video of the talk was moved from the TEDx YouTube channel to the TED blog accompanied by the framing language called for by the advisors. The move and framing prompted accusations of censorship, to which TED responded by saying the accusations were "simply not true" and that Sheldrake's talk was "up on our website."

In November 2013, Sheldrake gave a lecture at the Oxford Union outlining his claims, made in The Science Delusion, that modern science has become constrained by dogma, particularly in physics.

=== In popular culture ===
Between 1989 and 1999, Sheldrake, ethnobotanist Terence McKenna and mathematician Ralph Abraham recorded a series of discussions exploring diverse topics relating to the "world soul" and evolution. These resulted in a number of books based on the discussions: Trialogues at the Edge of the West: Chaos, Creativity and the Resacralization of the World (1992), The Evolutionary Mind: Trialogues at the Edge of the Unthinkable (1998), and The Evolutionary Mind: Conversations on Science, Imagination & Spirit (2005). In an interview for the book Conversations on the Edge of the Apocalypse, Sheldrake says he believes the use of psychedelic drugs "can reveal a world of consciousness and interconnection", which he says he has experienced. Alternative medicine advocate Deepak Chopra is a supporter of Sheldrake's work.

Sheldrake's work was amongst those cited in a faux research paper written by Alan Sokal and submitted to Social Text. In 1996, the journal published the paper as if it represented real scientific research, an event that has come to be known as the Sokal affair. Sokal later said that he had suggested in the hoax paper that 'morphogenetic fields' constituted a cutting-edge theory of quantum gravity, adding that "This connection [was] pure invention; even Sheldrake makes no such claim."

Sheldrake has been described as a New Age author, but does not endorse certain New Age interpretations of his ideas.

The 2009 Zero Escape video game Nine Hours, Nine Persons, Nine Doors was inspired by Sheldrake's morphogenetic field theories.

== Origin and philosophy of morphic resonance ==
Among his early influences Sheldrake cites The Structure of Scientific Revolutions (1962) by Thomas Kuhn. He has said the book led him to view contemporary scientific understanding of life as simply a paradigm, which he called "the mechanistic theory of life." Reading Kuhn's work, Sheldrake says, focused his mind on how scientific paradigms can change.

Sheldrake says that although there are similarities between morphic resonance and Hinduism's akashic records, he first conceived of the idea while at Cambridge, before his travel to India, where he later developed it. He attributes the origin of his idea to two influences: his studies of the holistic tradition in biology, and French philosopher Henri Bergson's 1896 book Matter and Memory. He says he took Bergson's concept of memories not being materially embedded in the brain and generalised it to morphic resonance, where memories are not only immaterial but also under the influence of the collective memories of similar organisms. While his colleagues at Cambridge were not receptive to the idea, Sheldrake found the opposite to be true in India. He recounts his Indian colleagues saying, "There's nothing new in this, it was all known millennia ago to the ancient rishis." Sheldrake thus characterises morphic resonance as a convergence between Western and Eastern thought, yet found by himself first in Western philosophy.

Sheldrake has also noted similarities between morphic resonance and Carl Jung's collective unconscious, with regard to collective memories being shared across individuals and the coalescing of particular behaviours through repetition, which Jung called archetypes. But whereas Jung assumed that archetypal forms were transmitted through physical inheritance, Sheldrake attributes collective memories to morphic resonance, and rejects any explanation of them involving what he terms "mechanistic biology."

Lewis Wolpert, one of Sheldrake's critics, has described morphic resonance as an updated Drieschian vitalism.

== Personal life ==
Sheldrake is married to therapist, voice teacher and author Jill Purce. They have two sons, biologist Merlin Sheldrake and musician Cosmo Sheldrake. Merlin Sheldrake is a mycologist and author of Entangled Life: How fungi make our worlds, change our minds and shape our futures.

Sheldrake is a practising Anglican. He has said that he studied with a Sufi teacher and practised Sufism while he was in India. Sheldrake reported "being drawn back to a Christian path" during his time in India.

== Bibliography ==
- A New Science of Life: the hypothesis of formative causation, Los Angeles: J.P. Tarcher, 1981 (second edition 1985, third edition 2009). ISBN 978-1-84831-042-1.
- The Presence of the Past: morphic resonance and the habits of nature, New York: Times Books, 1988. ISBN 0-8129-1666-2.
- The Rebirth of Nature: The greening of science and God, New York: Bantam Books, 1991. ISBN 0-553-07105-X.
- Seven Experiments That Could Change the World: a do-it-yourself guide to revolutionary science, New York: Riverhead Books, 1995. ISBN 1-57322-014-0.
- Dogs that Know When Their Owners are Coming Home: and other unexplained powers of animals, New York: Crown, 1999 (second edition 2011). ISBN 978-0-307-88596-8.
- The Sense of Being Stared At: and other aspects of the extended mind, New York: Crown Publishers, 2003. ISBN 0-609-60807-X.
- The Science Delusion: Freeing the spirit of enquiry, London: Coronet, 2012. ISBN 978-1-4447-2795-1 (U. S. Title: Science Set Free: 10 Paths to New Discovery).
- Science and Spiritual Practices, London: Coronet, 2017. ISBN 978-1-444-72792-0
- Ways To Go Beyond, And Why They Work: Seven Spiritual Practices in a Scientific Age, London: Coronet, 2019. ISBN 978-1-473-63007-9.

With Ralph Abraham and Terence McKenna:

- Trialogues at the Edge of the West: chaos, creativity, and the resacralisation of the world, Santa Fe, NM: Bear & Co. Pub., 1992. ISBN 0-939680-97-1.
- The Evolutionary Mind: trialogues at the edge of the unthinkable, Santa Cruz, CA: Dakota Books, 1997. ISBN 0-9632861-1-0.
- Chaos, Creativity and Cosmic Consciousness, Rochester, VT: Park Street Press, 2001. ISBN 0-89281-977-4.
- The Evolutionary Mind: Conversations on Science, Imagination & Spirit, Rhinebeck, NY: Monkfish Book Pub. Co., 2005. ISBN 0-9749359-7-2.

With Matthew Fox:

- Natural Grace: dialogues on creation, darkness, and the soul in spirituality and science, New York: Doubleday, 1996. ISBN 0-385-48356-2.
- The Physics of Angels: exploring the realm where science and spirit meet, San Francisco, CA: HarperSanFrancisco, 1996. ISBN 0-06-062864-2.

With Kate Banks:

- Boy's Best Friend, New York: Farrar, Straus and Giroux, 2015. ISBN 9780374380083.

With Michael Shermer:

- Arguing Science: A Dialogue on the Future of Science and Spirit, Rhinebeck, NY: Farrar, Monkfish Books, 2016. ISBN 978-1-939681-57-7.

== See also ==
- Fritjof Capra
- Ganying
- Groupthink
- Hundredth monkey effect
- Noosphere
- Philosophy of science
- Synchronicity
- Lyall Watson
- Water memory – Refuted theory behind homeopathic remedies
