= Caroline Watt =

Scottish parapsychologist

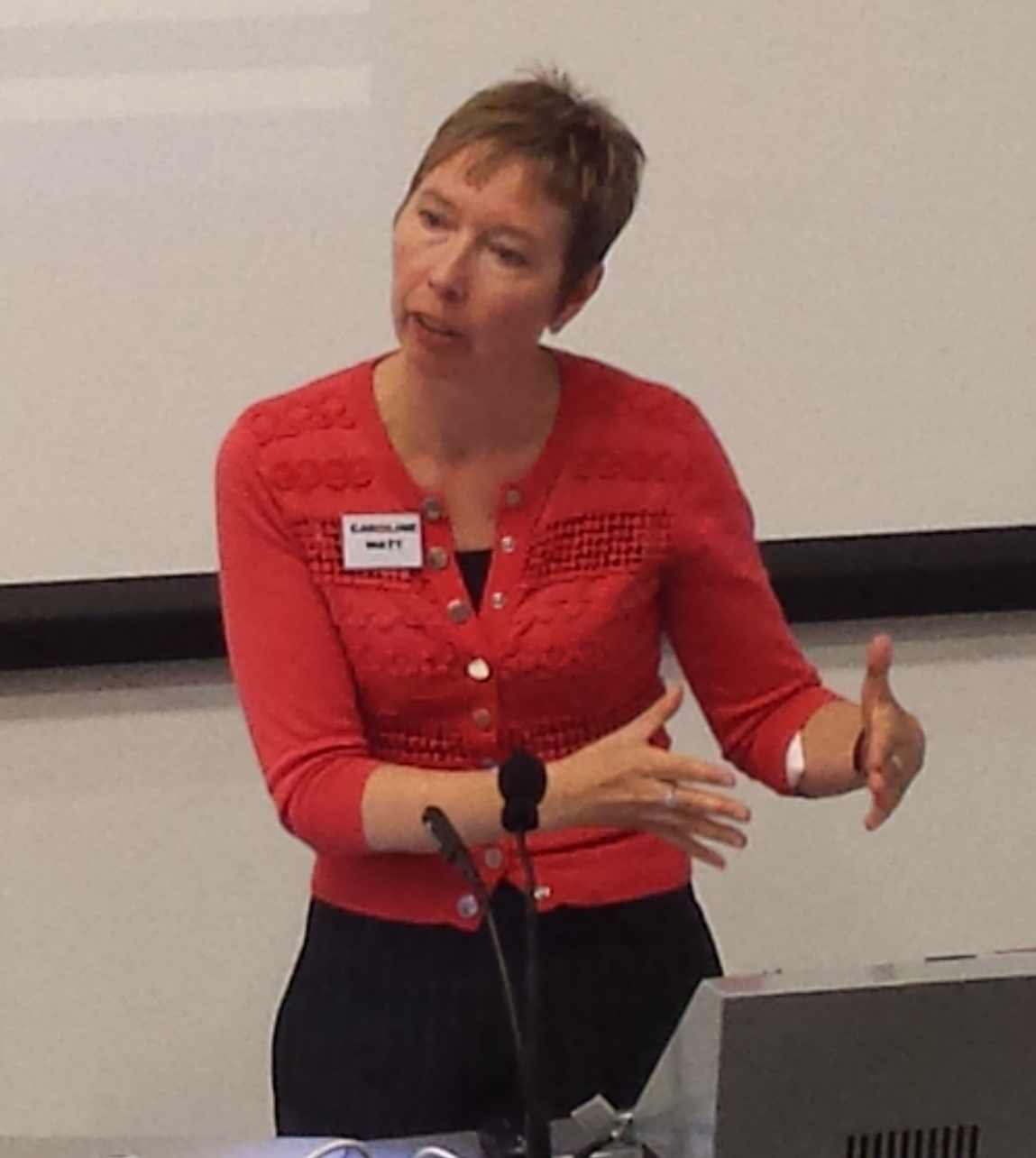
- Watt lecturing at the European Skeptics Congress 2015
- Born: Caroline Watt; 1962 (age 63–64); Perthshire, Scotland
- Education: University of St Andrews (MA); University of Edinburgh (PhD)
- Scientific career
- Workplaces: University of Edinburgh
- Thesis: The relationship between performance on a prototype measure of perceptual defence/vigilance and psi performance (1993)
- Doctoral advisor: Robert L. Morris

Caroline Watt's voice
Recorded October 2016

Caroline Watt (born 1962) is a Scottish psychologist and professor of parapsychology. She is the holder of the Koestler Chair of Parapsychology at the University of Edinburgh. She is a past president of the Parapsychological Association. She is an author of several papers and books on parapsychology and runs an online course that helps educate the public about what parapsychology is and to think critically about paranormal claims.

== Biography ==
Watt was born in Perthshire, Scotland in 1962. She graduated with a MA in psychology from the University of St Andrews in 1984, and is a founding member of the University of Edinburgh's Koestler Parapsychology Unit, for which she was recruited as a research assistant in 1986. She obtained a PhD in psychology in 1993, supervised by the parapsychologist Robert L. Morris.

Watt continued working at the Koestler Parapsychology unit as a research fellow until 2006, when she was appointed as senior lecturer in psychology at the University of Edinburgh. She has also been Perrot-Warrick Senior Researcher since 2010, and in 2016 she took up the new position as second Koestler Chair of Parapsychology at the university.

Watt coauthored the fifth edition of “An Introduction to Parapsychology”, published in 2007, which as of 2010 was the most frequently adopted text by those presenting academic courses on parapsychology and anomalistic psychology.

In 2016, Watt authored "Parapsychology: A Beginner's Guide".

== Near-death studies ==
With neuroscientist Dean Mobbs, in 2011, Watt published a paper on the near-death experience in the journal Trends in Cognitive Sciences. The paper explains how many common attributes of a near-death experience (an awareness of being dead, out-of-body experiences, seeing a tunnel of light, meeting dead people and a feeling of well-being) have medical or scientific explanations. An awareness of being dead is known as Cotard delusion and is attributed to a brain malfunction with possible causes such as brain tumour, depression or migraine headaches. The paper suggests "that out of-body experiences result from a failure to integrate multi-sensory information from one’s body, which results in the disruption of the phenomenological elements of self-representation." Seeing a tunnel of light can be caused by a degradation of peripheral vision brought on by extreme fear or hypoxia of the eye. The experience of meeting dead people can be brought on by a number of conditions, such as dopamine malfunction or a macular degeneration such as Charles Bonnet syndrome. A feeling of well-being could be caused by a response from the body's dopamine or endogenous opioid systems. The paper also cites a survey where it was found that approximately half of people reporting a near-death experience were not in danger of dying.

In regards to Sam Parnia's near-death research, which had an objective test that involved pictures or figures hidden on shelves where a patient could not see them when lying down, but would be able to see them if having an out-of-body experience, Watt stated, "The one ‘verifiable period of conscious awareness’ that Parnia was able to report did not relate to this objective test. Rather, it was a patient giving a supposedly accurate report of events during his resuscitation. He didn't identify the pictures, he described the defibrillator machine noise. But that's not very impressive since many people know what goes on in an emergency room setting from seeing recreations on television."

== Eye movement and lying ==
In 2011, Watt was part of a group, along with Richard Wiseman, that published research into the connection between eye movements and telling lies. The research, which was widely reported in the media, found no evidence that eye movements can be used to determine if someone is lying. Reading eye movements is part of neuro-linguistic programming (NLP), as according to NLP, people move their eyes in different directions when recalling information compared to when constructing information, i.e., lying.

Watt said, "A large percentage of the public believes that certain eye movements are a sign of lying, and this idea is even taught in organisational training courses. Our research provides no support for the idea and so suggests that it is time to abandon this approach to detecting deceit."

== Publication bias ==
The field of Parapsychology has been known for issues with study replication. Pre-registration of all studies seems to result in less publication bias. In 2012, she and Jim Kennedy founded a study register for their field and in 2019, she produced a scientific paper reporting on the success of such a technique.

== Selected publications ==
- Pluviano, S, Watt, C, Della Sala, S. (2017). 'Misinformation lingers in memory: Failure of three pro-vaccination strategies' PLoS One, 12(7): e0181640.
- Watt C. (2016). 'Parapsychology: A Beginner's Guide (Oneworld Beginner's Guides)'. ISBN 978-1780748870.
- Wiseman, R, Watt, C, ten Brinke, L, Porter, S, Couper, S-L & Rankin, C. (2012). "The Eyes Don’t Have It: Lie Detection and Neuro-Linguistic Programming" PLoS One, vol. 7, no. 7, e40259.
- Mobbs, D. & Watt, C. (2011). "There is nothing paranormal about near-death experiences: How neuroscience can explain seeing bright lights, meeting the dead, or being convinced you are one of them". Trends in Cognitive Sciences, 15, 447–506.
- Easter, A. & Watt, C. (2011). "It's good to know: How treatment knowledge and belief affect the outcome of distance healing intentionality for arthritis sufferers". Journal of Psychosomatic Research, 71, 86–89.
- Wiseman, R. & Watt, C. (2010). "'Twitter' as a new research tool: Proof of principle with a mass-participation test of remote viewing." European Journal of Parapsychology, 25, 89–100.
- Rabeyron, T. & Watt, C. (2010). "Paranormal experiences, mental health and mental boundaries, and psi". Personality and Individual Differences, 48:4, 487–492.
- Irwin, Harvey J. and Watt, Caroline A. (2007) An Introduction to Parapsychology, 5th edition. ISBN 978-0786430598.
- Watt, C., Watson, S., & Wilson, L. (2007). "Cognitive and psychological mediators of anxiety: Evidence from a study of paranormal belief and perceived childhood control". Personality and Individual Differences, 42:2, 335–343.
- Watt, C. (2006). "Research assistants or budding scientists? A Review of 96 undergraduate student projects at the Koestler Parapsychology Unit". Journal of Parapsychology, 70, 335–356.
- Wiseman, R. & Watt, C. (2006). "Belief in psychic ability and the misattribution hypothesis: A qualitative review". British Journal of Psychology, 97, 323–338.
- Wiseman, R., Watt, C., Stevens, P., Greening, E., & O’Keeffe, C. (2003). "An investigation into alleged ‘hauntings’". British Journal of Psychology, 94, 195–211.
- Watt, C. & Wiseman, R. (2002). "Experimenter differences in cognitive correlates of paranormal belief and in psi". Journal of Parapsychology, 66, 371–408.
