= Koestler Parapsychology Unit =

University of Edinburgh research group

Coordinates: 55°56′43″N 3°11′16″W

The Koestler Parapsychology Unit is a research group established in 1985 at the University of Edinburgh, in Scotland, to teach and conduct research concerning various aspects of parapsychology. It hosts the only endowed chair of parapsychology in the UK, established by a bequest following the suicide in 1983 of internationally acclaimed intellectual, writer and journalist Arthur Koestler. The first person to hold the chair, beginning in 1985, was Robert L. Morris. John Beloff and Joshua Snyder were instrumental in setting it up. The chair is currently held by Professor Caroline Watt.

The unit interprets parapsychology events to include in its remit "what’s not psychic but looks like it" and makes no judgement about the mechanisms underlying apparent paranormal events. Its focus is primarily on understanding why people believe they have psi experiences, and on how to improve the scientific rigour of studies.

The unit includes the Koestler Parapsychology Library.
