= Egon Larsen =

Egon Larsen (13 July 1904 - 17 October 1990) was a German science journalist and writer.

Larsen, born in Munich, authored numerous books. Facing persecution under Nazism, he relocated to Prague and later to London in 1938.

== Publications ==
- Men Who Changed The World Stories of Invention and Discovery (1952)
- Men Under the Sea (1955)
- You'll See: Report from the Future (1957)
- Atomic Energy: A Layman's Guide to the Nuclear Age (1958)
- Ideas and Invention (1960)
- The Cavendish Laboratory: Nursery of Genius (1962)
- Atoms and Atomic Energy (1963)
- Men Who Fought for Freedom (1963)
- Inventors (1965)
- The Deceivers: Lives of the Great Imposters (1966)
- Great Humorous Stories of the World (1967)
- First with the Truth: Newspapermen in Action (1968)
- A History of Inventions (1969)
- Great Ideas in Engineering (1970)
- Strange Sects and Cults: A Study of Their Origins and Influence (1972)
- Weimar Eyewitness (1976)
- New Sources of Energy and Power (1976)
- Telecommunications: A History (1977)
- A Flame in Barbed Wire: The Story of Amnesty International (1978)
- Wit as a Weapon: The Political Joke in History (1980)
