= Richard Wiseman =

British psychologist (born 1966)

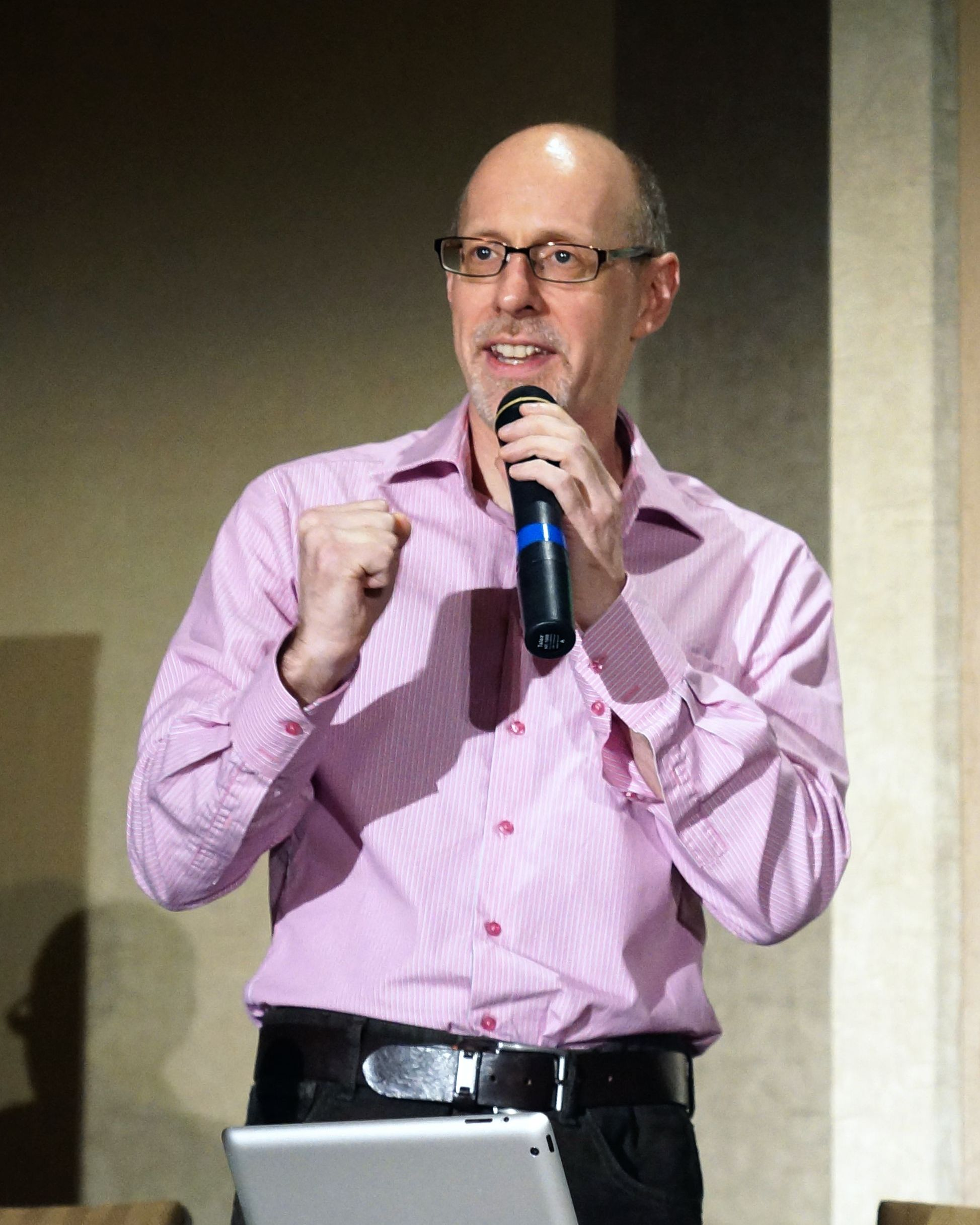
- Wiseman at CSICon 2012.
- Born: Richard John Wiseman; 16 September 1966 (age 60); Luton, England
- Education: University College London (BSc); University of Edinburgh (PhD)
- Scientific career
- Workplaces: University of Hertfordshire
- Thesis: The assessment of psychic claimants : an application of schema theory to the evaluation of strong psychic claims (1992)
- Doctoral advisor: Robert L. Morris

YouTube information
- Channels: Quirkology; In59seconds
- Subscribers: 2.43 million (Quirkology); 1.75 million (In59seconds)
- Richard Wiseman's voice Recorded October 2016
- Website: richardwiseman.wordpress.com

Richard John Wiseman (born 16 September 1966) is a professor of the public understanding of psychology at the University of Hertfordshire in the United Kingdom. He has written several psychology books. He has given keynote addresses to the Royal Society, the Swiss Economic Forum, Google and Amazon. He is a fellow for the Committee for Skeptical Inquiry and a patron of Humanists UK. Wiseman is also the creator of the YouTube channels Quirkology and In59Seconds.

== Early life and education ==
Wiseman was born and raised in Luton. His mother a seamstress and his father an engineer, he learned his trade as a teenage magician working the crowds in Covent Garden.

At 18, he continued as a street performer and went to University College London to study psychology, partly because it "was right around the corner". He shared accommodation as a student with Adrian Owen, later also to become a psychologist. In his years as a street performer he learned how to adapt or get out of what you are doing because "Sometimes you would start your act and after five minutes there was no audience." He moved to Edinburgh where he obtained his PhD in Psychology from the University of Edinburgh for research supervised by Robert L. Morris.

== Career and research ==
After completing his PhD, he became Britain's first professor in the public understanding of psychology at the University of Hertfordshire.

In his early years at the University of Hertfordshire, Wiseman partnered with Simon Singh on a BBC segment about lying for the National Science Week. The segment spanned TV, radio and print and featured a "politician making a statement, and letting the public vote on whether they thought this figure was telling the truth in each medium." It was the first time that Wiseman and Singh met. From the beginning, the two got along well and on Singh's idea, ended up creating a show together called Theatre of Science. The show aimed to deliver science to the audience in an entertaining manner. Wiseman describes how one stunt involved standing in a cage between two Tesla coils while lightning struck the cage. Wiseman ended up writing The Luck Factor in part due to Singh as well. With the success of Singh's book, Fermat's Last Theorem, Singh introduced Wiseman to his agent and encouraged him to write a similar book in the psychology arena, which led to The Luck Factor.

=== Psychological research ===
Wiseman critically examines and frequently debunks unusual phenomena, including reports of paranormal phenomena. He is a fellow of the Committee for Skeptical Inquiry (CSI). His research has been published in numerous academic journals, reported at various conferences, and featured on television.

Wiseman has studied the principles of good and bad luck, publishing the results in the self-help book The Luck Factor. He showed that both good and bad luck result from measurable habits; for example, lucky people, by expecting good luck, might expend more effort in their endeavours, resulting in more success, reinforcing their belief in good luck. Lucky people are outgoing and observant and therefore have many more chance encounters than unlucky people, each of which could bring a lucky opportunity. Moreover, lucky people are more likely to look on the bright side of 'bad' encounters. In a mental exercise describing being shot during a bank robbery, lucky people considered themselves lucky not to have been killed while unlucky people considered themselves unlucky to have been shot.

=== Public engagement ===
Wiseman prefers to make discuss, research and think about the implications of his work; instead of talking directly about eyewitness testimony in law, he would set something up that looked like it, such as his colour-changing card trick. In this mindset, he has presented keynote addresses to organisations around the world and in well known forums and congresses like the Swiss Economic Forum and ESOMAR Congress.

In 2001, Wiseman led LaughLab, an international experiment to find the world's funniest joke. The winning joke described a caller to emergency services who shoots his friend who has collapsed to comply with the instruction "First, let's make sure he's dead". The experiment also explored regional and cultural variations in humour. These public psychology experiments – such as enlisting people to name, and rate, their favourite gags in the search for the world's funniest jokes – have drawn hundreds of thousands of participants and plenty of press.

In 2011, Wiseman wrote the first section of a collaborative story at Libboo in an attempt to produce a full-length novel in two months. The final result of this experiment, was a novel called, Paradox: The Curious Life, and Mysterious Death, of Mr Joseph Wheeler.

In 2013 Richard Wiseman became the first guest curator at Edinburgh's International Science Festival. He participated in the festival with "Richard Wiseman's Beginners Guide to... Climate Change". In 2014 he does a repeat of his 'Beginners Guide to' but this time with 3 different talks:

- "Richard Wiseman's Beginners Guide to... Fermat's Last Theorem" with writer and broadcaster Simon Singh.
- "Richard Wiseman's Beginners Guide to... Astrobiology" with Imperial College's Dr Zita Martins.
- "Richard Wiseman's Beginners Guide to... the Earth" with earth scientist and broadcaster Hermione Cockburn (BBC).

Wiseman has also become a content creator on YouTube after uploading a video of the colour changing card trick in 2007 that has 6. 5 million views as of April 2020. He is best known for his "Bets You Will Always Win" series, which has amassed over 60 million views throughout 10 videos. On 7 January 2014, Wiseman uploaded a video to a new channel called "59 Seconds" in promotion of his book of the same name.

Wiseman is a patron of Humanists UK and appeared in the Nine Lessons and Carols for Godless People Christmas stage show organised by the New Humanist. He is also a Distinguished Supporter of Humanist Society Scotland.

In 2017 Wiseman interviewed Richard Dawkins at CSIcon Las Vegas 2017 covering topics on evolution, extra terrestrials and god.

=== Edinburgh Secret Society ===
The Edinburgh Secret Society organises events for those of a curious disposition. These include verbal, theatrical and experimental presentations intended to inform, entertain and bewilder. This group, as the name states, tends to be low key and has appeared in very few news outlets. The Society motto is 'The king cannot be saved, the king cannot make custard', which is one of many things the group won't openly say the meaning of. It is run by Peter Lamont, friend and colleague, and Richard Wiseman having events involving The Filmhouse, the British Science Association, Edinburgh's World of Illusions, and The Edinburgh International Science Festival. Through the Edinburgh Secret Society Wiseman has found a new following, hosting evenings of irreverent talks and entertainment on topics including self-help and dying. In February 2011 they staged 'An Evening of Death' in A Victorian Anatomy Theatre at the University of Edinburgh, an event that sold out its 250 tickets within minutes.

=== Teaching ===
Wiseman is a professor in "public psychology" at the University of Hertfordshire who divides his time between London and Edinburgh. He is a sceptic who does not believe in extrasensory perception or prayer and who, as a former magician, rejects the purported supernatural experiences reported in séances conducted in darkened rooms where every kind of trickery is available.

=== Media appearances ===
Wiseman's research has been featured on over 150 television programmes, including Horizon, Equinox and World in Action. He is regularly heard on BBC Radio 4, including appearances on Start the Week, Midweek and the Today programme. Wiseman also makes numerous appearances on some British television shows; in The Real Hustle he explains the psychology behind many of the scams and confidence tricks; in Mind Games he's a regular team captain of a panel game of puzzles, anagrams and conundrums; and in People Watchers, a hidden-camera show examining human behaviour. Besides being interviewed in several of these television programmes, he was a creative consultant in an episode of Your Bleeped Up Brain and a researcher of the documentary Unlawful Killing.

Feature articles about his work have regularly appeared in The Times, The Daily Telegraph and The Guardian.

Wiseman's 2011 book, Paranormality: Why We See What Isn't There was electronically self-published in the United States, as Wiseman was told by American publishers there was no interest in scepticism.

In 2011, the first section of a collaborative story at Libboo in an attempt to produce a full-length novel in two months. The final result of this experiment, was a novel called, Paradox: The Curious Life, and Mysterious Death, of Mr Joseph Wheeler.

=== Focus on the paranormal ===
Wiseman is known for his critical examination and frequent debunking of unusual phenomena, including reports of paranormal phenomena. He is a fellow of the Committee for Skeptical Inquiry (CSI). His research has been published in numerous academic journals, reported at various conferences, and featured on television.

In 2004, he took part in a preliminary test of Natasha Demkina, a young Russian woman who claims to have a special vision that allows her to see inside of people's bodies and diagnose illnesses. The test, whose validity has been disputed by Demkina's supporters, was featured in the Discovery Channel documentary, The Girl with X-Ray Eyes.

Wiseman has published studies on anomalistic psychology and the psychology of paranormal belief. He is the author of the book titled Paranormality: Why We See What Isn't There (2011) which takes a psychological approach to paranormal phenomena. The book offers its readers tools to investigate paranormal claims using QR Codes, which Wiseman saw as "exciting use of new media" to allow people to see footage and make up their minds themselves.

In 2020, Wiseman, illustrator Jordan Collver and writer Rik Worth created Hocus Pocus, an interactive comic-book series that "promotes skepticism and critical thinking". The first issue focuses on Victorian performer and mind reader Washington Irving Bishop and pioneer of parapsychology Joseph Banks Rhine. The second issue features the Fox sisters and séances. In 2022 the series was nominated for "Best Limited Series" at the Eisner Awards. The series was collected into a single volume and published by Vanishing Inc in January 2023.

=== Dream: ON The App ===
Wiseman launched the Dream: ON App at the Edinburgh International Science Festival 2012. It was developed and maintained by YUZA, a mobile experience team based in London. The app was powered by an engine which constantly monitored and adjusted the behaviour of Dream: ON; optimising the experience for the user. When the user entered the rapid eye movement (REM) stage of sleep where dreaming is most common, the app delivered unique audio soundscapes which the subconscious is shown to respond to.

"We have created a new way of carrying out mass participation experiments. We still know relatively little about the science of dreaming and this app may provide a real breakthrough in changing how we dream, and record and track those dreams." – Professor Richard Wiseman

The app was also a social experiment: in the morning it presented users with a graph of their movement during the night, allows users to tag any friends who appeared in their dreams via Facebook and invites them to post a short description of their dreams to an experimental "Dream Bank", creating the world's largest dream experiment.

=== The Good Magic Awards ===
In collaboration with the Good Thinking Society, Wiseman set up The Good Magic Awards. These awards recognise and reward performers that use magic tricks to improve the lives of people in disadvantaged groups, charities, community groups, hospital patients, and others struggling with physical and psychological challenges.

The awards were announced on 17 March 2020, and were awarded for the first time on 5 May 2020.

=== Awards ===
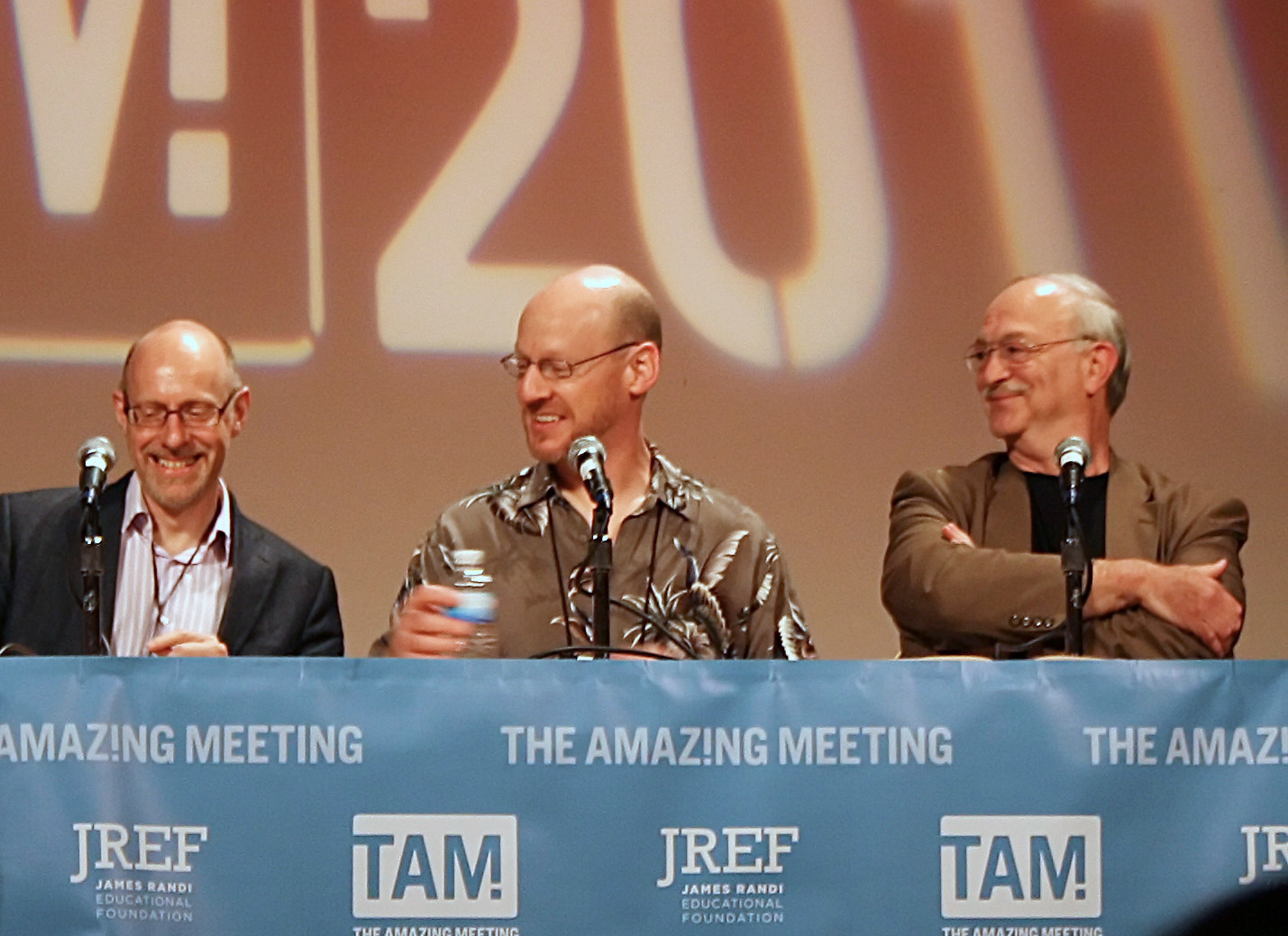
Richard Wiseman (left) during TAM9 in 2011, with Phil Plait and Joe Nickell

- CSICOP Public Education in Science Award, 2000
- British Science Association Joseph Lister Award, 2002
- NESTA Fellowship for his innovative work in science communication, 2004
- In 2011 the Committee for Skeptical Inquiry (CSICOP) presented Wiseman the Robert B. Balles Prize for Critical Thinking for his book Paranormality. "Wiseman is not simply interested in looking at a claim... He is interested in showing us how easy it is for us to be deceived and how easily we can be fooled and fool others."
- In 2016 he was awarded an Honorary Doctorate of Science by Abertay University in Dundee.
- In 2019, he was awarded the Humanist Media Award by the American Humanist Association.
- The Masters Of Magic have announced that Wiseman will be awarded the Golden Grolla award for his work in psychology and illusion at their 2020 convention
- Royal Society David Attenborough Award and Lecture 2023.

=== Books ===
Richard Wiseman talks about 59 Seconds on Bookbits radio.

- Wiseman, R. & Morris, R. L. (1995). Guidelines for Testing Psychic Claimants. Hatfield: University of Hertfordshire Press (US edition: Amherst: Prometheus Press).
- Milton, J. & Wiseman, R. (1997). Guidelines for Extrasensory Perception Research. Hatfield: University of Hertfordshire Press.
- Wiseman, R. (1997). Deception and self-deception: Investigating Psychics. Amherst: Prometheus Press
- Lamont, P. & Wiseman, R. (1999). Magic in Theory: an introduction to the theoretical and psychological elements of conjuring. Hatfield: University of Hertfordshire Press (US edition: Hermetic Press).
- Wiseman, R. (2002). Laughlab: The Scientific Search For The World's Funniest Joke. London: Random House
- Wiseman, R. (2003). The Luck Factor. London: Random House
- Wiseman, R. (2004). Did you spot the gorilla? How to recognise hidden opportunities in your life. London: Random House
- Wiseman, R. & Watt, C. (2005). Parapsychology. London: Ashgate International Library of Psychology. Series Editor, Prof. David Canter
- Wiseman, R. (2007). Quirkology. London: Pan Macmillan
- Wiseman, R. (2009). 59 Seconds: Think a Little, Change a Lot. London: Pan Macmillan
- Wiseman, R. (2011). Paranormality: Why we see what isn't there. London: Pan Macmillan
- Wiseman, R. (2012). Rip it up: The radically new approach to changing your life. London: Macmillan
- Wiseman, R. (2014). Night School: Wake up to the power of sleep . London: Macmillan
- Wiseman, R. (2018). How to remember things. London: Macmillan
- Wiseman, R. (2019). Shoot for the Moon. London: Quercus Editions Ltd
- Worth, R., Collver, J. & Wiseman, R. (2020). Hocus Pocus: Science, Magic and Mystery. (Issues 1-5) Self-published
- Copperfield, D., Wiseman, R. & Britland, D. (2021). David Copperfield's History of Magic. Simon & Schuster
- Worth, R., Collver, J. & Wiseman, R. (2023). Hocus Pocus: The Complete Collection. Vanishing Inc.
- Wiseman, R. (2023). "Magic". UK: University of Hertfordshire. Emerald Publishing Limited.
