= Society for Consciousness Studies =

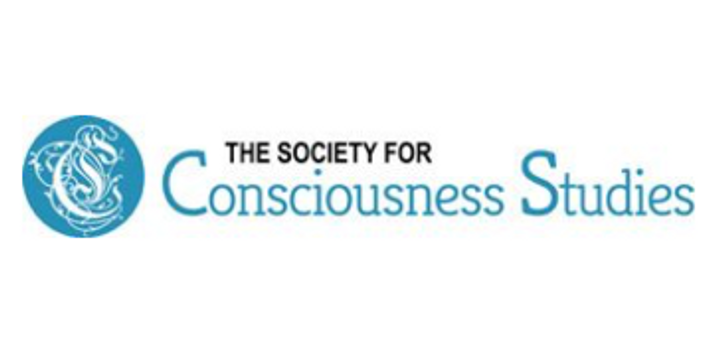

The Society for Consciousness Studies (SCS) is a professional scholarly organization founded in San Francisco. The Society aims to promote a multidisciplinary approach to human and animal consciousness studies. Allan Combs is the founder and president, and founding members of SCS include Combs, Imants Barušs, Julie Mossbridge, Constance Scharff, Jeffrey A. Martin, Ben Goertzel, Stephen A. Schwartz, Chris Fields, Laurel McCormick, Stanley Krippner, Carolyn Cooke, Frank Echenhofer, Jayne Gackenbach, Eugene Taylor, Etzel Cardeña, Zoran Josipovic, James Clement van Pelt, and Kate Noble.

== History ==
The SCS began in 2012 as a collaboration among a group of scholars in the nascent field of consciousness studies who were seeking a professionally rigorous but philosophically open forum for communication with each other and for collaborating on research and scholarly projects.

During its first year, the SCS held several informal meetings in the San Francisco area to discuss the teaching of consciousness studies. It held its first full conference in June 2014 in San Francisco at the California Institute of Integral Studies. Fifty talks and were presented at this conference. During subsequent years the ISCS has held yearly conferences alternating between the West Coast in San Francisco and the East Coast at Yale University. Presenters have represented a wide range of research and scholarship, including the original founders of the Society and world-renowned speakers in the field such as Deepak Chopra, Nancy Ellen Abrams, Bernard Baars, and Ervin Laszlo.

The 2019 Conference, "Consciousness and Spirit II", was held at the Graduate Institute (Bethany, Connecticut) and at the []Yale Divinity School]\ (New Haven) May 31-June 2, 2018. The first "Consciousness and Spirit" conference was presented at Yale in 2008 by the Society for the Anthropology of Consciousness.

== Membership and Publications ==
Over the past three years, membership in the Society for Consciousness Studies has grown to nearly 200 present members, including doctoral students and scholars from Europe, North and South America, Africa, and Asia.

As of 2018, notable members on the Society's board of directors include Combs, Imants Barušs, Deepak Chopra, Ben Goertzel, and Stanley Krippner.

The Society has a two-tiered membership that includes "incidental short reports" on research, scholarship, and application fields that are influenced by consciousness studies.

The Society also is available to publish and review programs and courses on consciousness studies in North America and elsewhere, as well as publishing incidental reviews of important publications.
