= Matuschka =

American artist & author

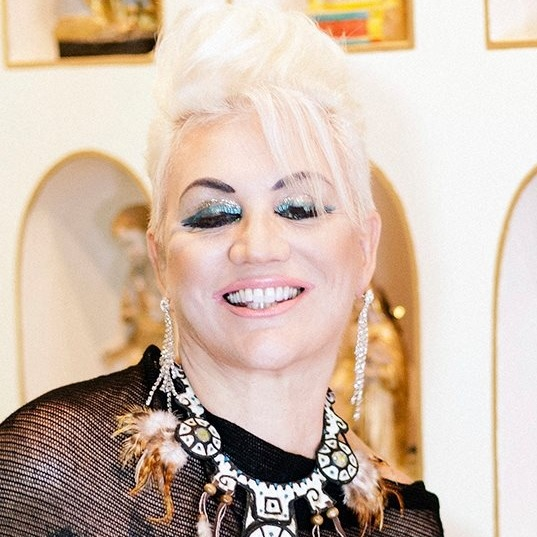
- Matuschka in 2017, photo by Jesus Jimenez
- Born: Joanne Motichka; New Jersey
- Other names: Jersey Jo, Maxi
- Education: School of Visual Arts, Prescott College
- Occupations: Artist, photographer, model, singer, writer
- Years active: 1972–present
- Awards: Pulitzer Prize nomination, Feature Photography (1994); ABC Person of the Week (1993); Rachel Carson Award (1994); Gold: World Press Foundation (Headline News 1994); Photo District News Nikon Award (1997); Gilda Radner Award (1995); Graphis Best Environmental Award (1996) Life Books Special Edition: 100 Photographs that Changed the World (2003 and 2011); Bunte Magazine Tribute, Women of the Nineties Who Changed the World (1998); etc.
- Website: www.matuschkathemodelofthefuture.com, www.matuschka.net, www.beautyoutofdamage.com

Joanne Motichka (born 19 March 1954), known professionally as Matuschka, is an American photographer, artist, author, activist, and model. Her self-portrait on the Sunday cover of New York Times magazine in 1993 was chosen by LIFE for a special edition entitled 100 Photographs that Changed the World published in 2003 and again in 2011. The artist has been nominated for many awards, including a Pulitzer Prize, and has received dozens of citations, honors, and distinctions for her photographic works, and activism since the early 1990s. In 2012 Matuschka appeared in Rose Hartman's book Incomparable Women of Style, and in 2011 John Loengard included her in his monograph: The Age of Silver: Encounters with Great Photographers.

== Early life ==
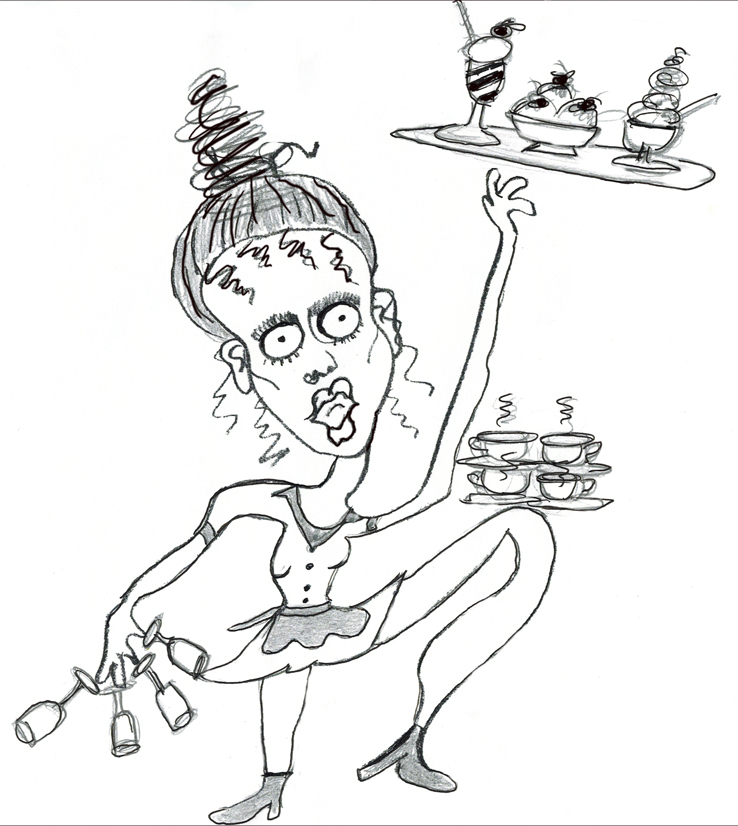
A sketch by Matuschka from her early days waitressing

Matuschka was born in Newton, New Jersey to a policeman at the George Washington Bridge and a mother, who was a farm hand from Allamuchy, New Jersey. In 1968, when Matuschka was 13, her mother died of breast cancer.

Six months after her Mother's death, Matuschka ran away from home, changed her name to “Lisa Cross” and began working as a cocktail waitress in Far Rockaway, New York. A year later "Lisa Cross" returned to New Jersey, became a ward of the State of New Jersey and was placed in foster care.

In 1970, Matuschka, 15, was adopted by the Marco family of Paramus, New Jersey. Anton Marco was an opera singer who toured Europe with Marlene Dietrich during the World War II, appeared in Woody Allen's film Zelig. and later gave Matuschka singing lessons in his music salon. His wife, Mourine Marco—a Special Ed teacher—recognized Matuschka's raw talent and enrolled her in art classes, provided books from the local library, and suggested she become a life-sketching model. Mrs. Marco also urged her to visit museums and galleries in New York City, encouraged her to keep a journal, write poetry, document her dreams, and scribe her memoirs.

That same summer, Matuschka and her foster sister went skinny dipping in Mahwah, New Jersey where they had a chance encounter with a photographer. An unexpected shoot followed and the pictures taken that day of Matuschka, began her modeling and photography career simultaneously at age 16.

Although Mrs. Marco and Matuschka would share a special relationship until the elder's death in 2005, Matuschka would go on to live in three more foster homes before the Bureau of Children's Services made a decision to send her to Windsor Mountain School, a boarding school located in Lenox Massachusetts in 1971.

== Education ==
=== Windsor Mountain Prep School ===
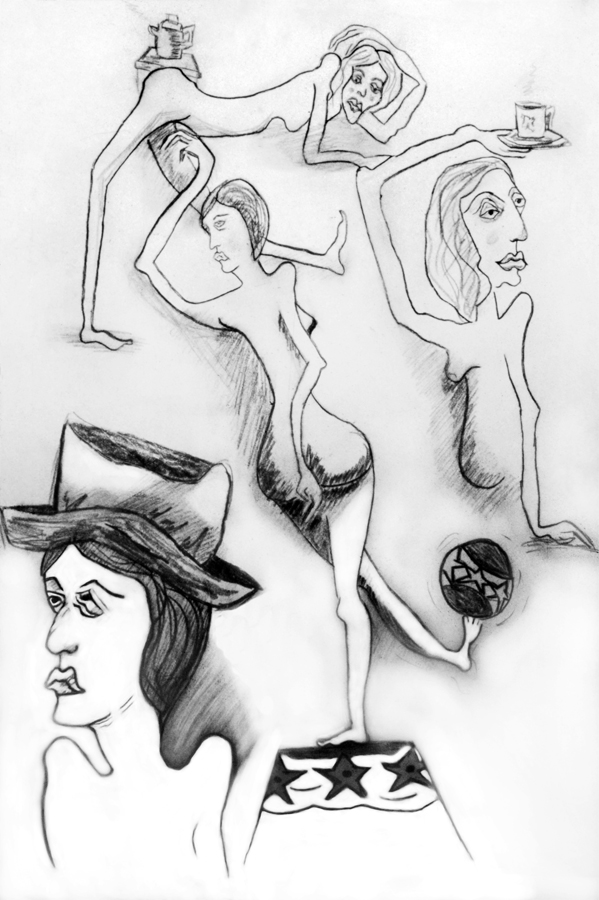
Matuschka's rendition of herself as a life-sketching model 1972

Windsor Mountain School was a private Prep School in the Berkshires and was known for its progressive, experiential learning, and multi-cultural student body. It is at Windsor Mountain School that Jan Wiener, a European History teacher, gave the aspiring artist and model the nickname "Matuschka"—a version of Motichka—which sounded much like her idol, the model "Veruschka".

At Windsor Mountain Matuschka excelled in the arts, winning the Art Prize at graduation and showed interest in photography as an art form. In 1973 she had her first solo art exhibition of figurative works at the Lenox Library, which was reviewed in The Berkshire Eagle.

As a teenager, Matuschka worked as a waitress, maid, house painter, wood splitter, electrician, fully attired Go-Go dancer, nude model, art assistant, and photo retoucher.

=== The Berkshires ===
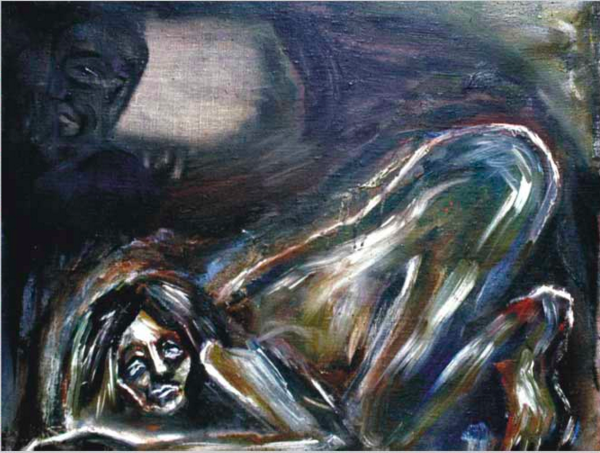
The Two of Us 1973; Oil on Canvas 30" x 18"

Matuschka lived in Lenox next to Tanglewood and close to Alice's Restaurant where she met Ray and Alice Brock, attending several of their classic Thanksgiving dinners, and was introduced to photographers Gerard Malanga and Don Snyder. Don Snyder would go on to become Matuschka's mentor as she became his muse and mentee for the next 30 years.

During the two years she lived in the Berkshires, Matuschka worked as a photography/gallery assistant and apprentice to photojournalist Clemens Kalischer of The Image Gallery in Stockbridge, Massachusetts. She also posed for life sketching classes, regional artists, and taught life sketching classes at Windsor Mountain. Matuschka's work as both a model and photographic assistant was essential to her development both behind the camera and in front of one. In the mid 70s Snyder introduced her to William Silano in NYC and working alongside these two photographers, she learned the art of chemically toning and manipulating prints in the darkroom. It is during this time that Matuschka began photographing herself in black and white on 35mm film.

=== College ===
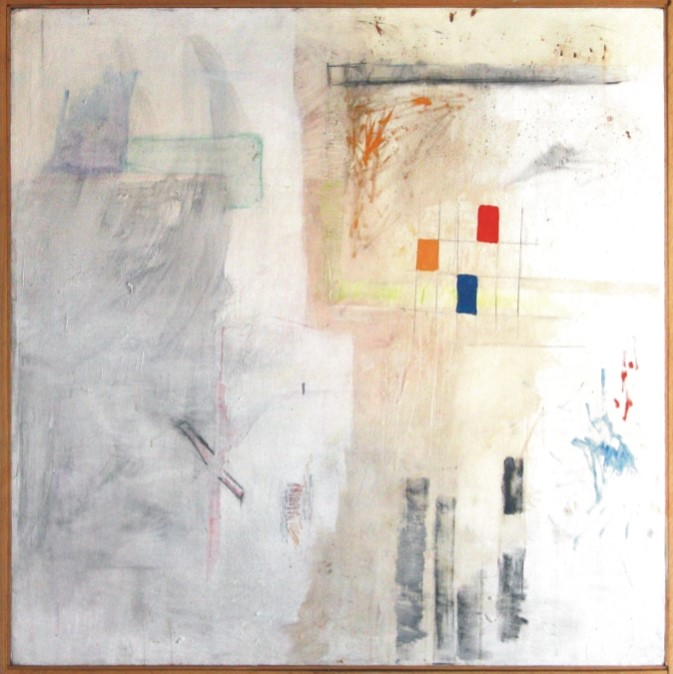
Abstract—Best White (1975) acrylic on canvas 48"x48"

Matuschka was enrolled for the 1973 fall semester at Washington University in St. Louis, Missouri, but at the last minute decided to matriculate at Prescott College—a small, private, liberal, school in Arizona founded by the Ford Foundation. At Prescott, she designed an independent curriculum with a variety of regional artists specializing in architecture. Her field studies brought her to the works and sites of Paolo Soleri, Frank Lloyd Wright, and Antoni Gaudi. Matuschka frequented Native American ruins in addition to Arcosanti, Cosanti, and Taliesin West—all a short distance from campus.

After taking the course of George Bruce at Prescott, she was invited by Bruce to publish her poetry in a Scottish Anthology called Arkos, which he edited. He selected a suite of Matuschka's poems entitled Visions from a Locked Ward for the 1974 edition.

Matuschka had her second solo show entitled The Tragedy of a Space Condemned at the Bofus Gallery at Prescott College which was reviewed in the Prescott Courier in 1974. This was the beginning of the artist's interest in combining text and imagery.

Prescott College went bankrupt at that time, and Matuschka transferred to the School of Visual Arts (SVA) in New York City the following year.

At SVA, Matuschka studied with painters Jennifer Bartlett and Frank Roth. At night she drove for an illegal taxi operation, becoming one of the first and most likely youngest females—or individuals—to drive for a commercial taxi fleet at night. She was hired by Chase Maintenance Cab Company on West 47th Street during New York's most turbulent crime ridden years.

== Career ==
=== The New York years: 1974–1987 ===
==== Modeling ====
In 1975, while driving a cab in NYC, a fare suggested Matuschka try fashion modeling and introduced her to his friend Wilhelmina of the Wilhelmina Modeling Agency. Wilhelmina set her up with agents in Milan and Paris to expand her portfolio. At 21, Matuschka quit both college and taxi driving to pursue a fashion career abroad. While traveling, Matuschka often took out her make-up and magic markers and made caricatures and cartoons of the people she met, often photographing them first with her SX-70 Polaroid camera.

In the 1970s she modeled for Fabrizio Gianni in Italy, Christian Dior in France and Scott Barrie in NYC among others. In the late 1970s, Matuschka was the house model for The House of Julio. In 1978, the courtier designer Charles James proclaimed Matuschka to be "The Model of the Future". Videographer Anton Perich frequently filmed Matuschka, and broadcasts featuring her interviews at Bonwit Teller, catwalks and fittings at the Chelsea Hotel (with Couri Hay and Charles James) and a 'couch cutting creation out of styrofoam' with John Chamberlain (for the artist John R. Hersey) at the Dakota have been aired on Cable TV, Channel J, since the 1970s. Extensive video and still footage of Matuschka working with Charles James (by Anton Perich) was exhibited at the National Arts Club (NYC) in a show entitled Beneath the Dress in 2014.

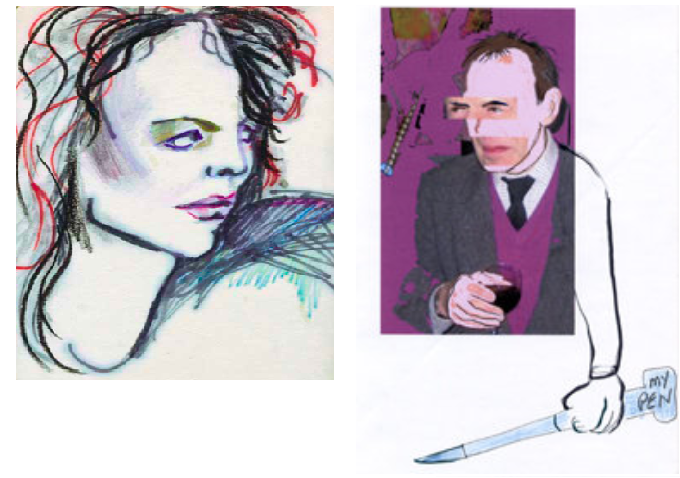
Sketches of herself (1984) and Anthony Haden-Guest (2006)

In print, Matuschka has worked with some of the world's renowned photographers including Nick Knight for Dazed and Confused, Robert Maxwell for More Magazine and Nadav Kander for his book, Beauty's Nothing. She posed for Gerard Malanga (of Warhol's factory), Don Snyder, Push Pin Studios, Bill Cunningham (The New York Times), Jeff Dunas for Oui Magazine and was featured in Mr. Dunas' book, Mademoiselle, Mademoiselle! in 1983. In the 70s and 80s she apprenticed with Town & Country / Harper's Bazaar photographer Bill Silano, perfecting her printing skills in the darkroom.

==== Authorship ====
In the mid-1970s, Matuschka began pursuing a writing career and spent many nights at Elaine's, the Carlyle Hotel, the St. Regis and P.J. Clarke's where she met and worked with a variety of writers and artists including: Salvador Dalí, Norman Wexler (who wrote Saturday Night Fever in an apartment across the hall from her flat), gonzo journalist Anthony Haden-Guest, writer, sports publisher and socialite George Plimpton, Michael O'Donoghue (Saturday Night Live), producer Bertrand Castelli, socialites Ted Otis and the Van de Bovenkamps and bestselling author Joseph DiMona. Joe DiMona introduced her to Pine Associates Literary Agency in 1978 and the father/son duo represented her intellectual properties for a brief time. Excerpts of her unpublished memoir were reprinted in three issues of OUI Magazine, a subsidiary of Playboy Magazine, in 1981. One feature included an introduction by Anthony Haden-Guest and a pictorial spread by Jeff Dunas. She received a PEN Writing grant during this time. Since the 1980s Matuschka's writings and poetry have appeared in dozens of publications and books worldwide from Glamour magazine, to Oxford anthologies and academic journals on a wide range of subjects.

==== Music ====
In the 1980s, Matuschka began combining her poetry and prose with music she wrote. As a performer she became known as "Jersey Jo Matuschka".

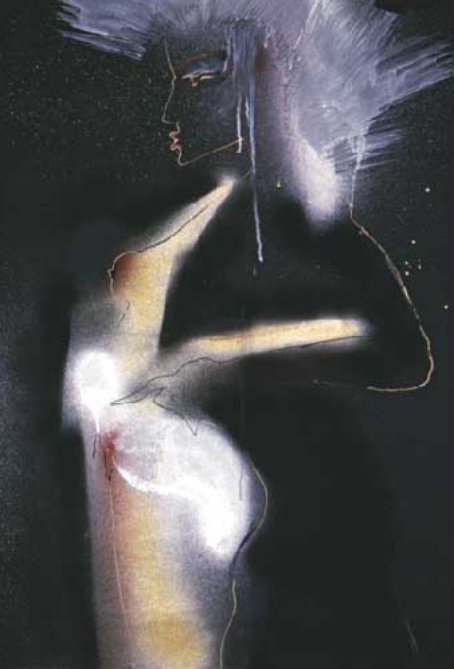
Black Beauty from the Whores Galore series, Paint on Paper 36" x 22" (1986)

Producer Jay Rifkin (Rain Man, The Lion King) first of Miracle Express and later Clinton Studios in NYC and Media Ventures in Los Angeles recorded, produced and worked with "Jersey Jo" and her band in the mid-to-late 80s. "Jersey Jo" performed at Trax, The Bitter End, Kenny's Castaways, The Pyramid Club and Danceteria. In 1987, she won first place in the "rock off" contest in the Dominican Republic, playing with Hilly Michaels, former drummer of Sparks. During this period Matuschka created a series of works on paper entitled Whores Galore based on the red-light district. The collection was sold out.

==== Photography ====
===== The Ruins – Matuschka =====
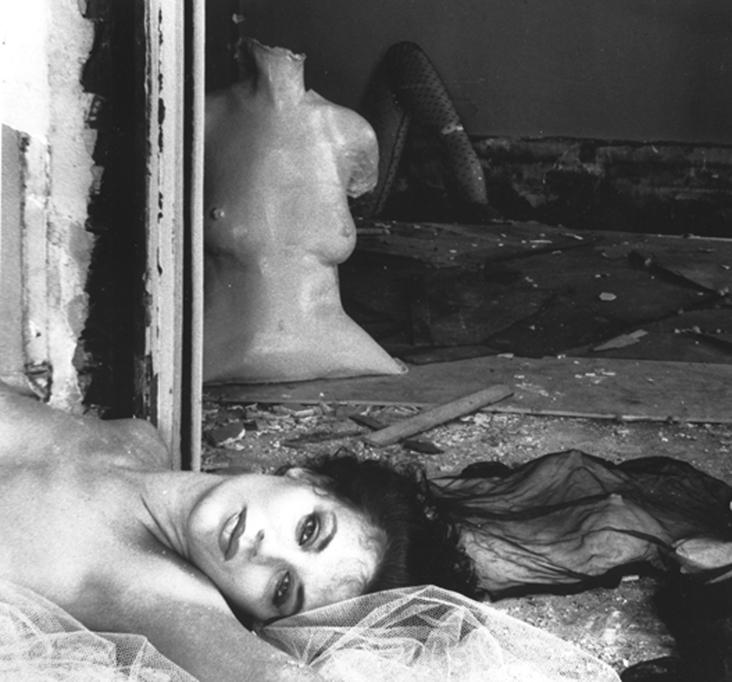
Beheaded 1987

And when it's over before noon
before the coffee and the spoon
when one thing leads to another
and we don't know what to do with the ruins

"The Ruins" – Matuschka

In 1987, Matuschka's Record Company asked her to design the cover for her album jacket. Although the company went bankrupt, Matuschka proceeded making images to illustrate her music. In the late 1980s she chose photography as her main medium after taking pictures of herself in abandoned buildings based on a song she wrote called "The Ruins".

Matuschka always works in series, typically photographing herself in a wide range of locations, different contexts and various guises. To create her photographs, Matuschka assumes numerous roles as she explores the shapes formulated by her body, the various aspects of her persona, the connection between beauty and damage, and the history of photography itself.

The Ruins series was published in many fine art magazines internationally, including the cover of P/F (Professional Photography) while exhibits were mounted at the Center for Photography at Woodstock and the Photographic Museum of Helsinki. The Ruins, based on Matuschka posing alongside plaster casts of her body in abandoned buildings, is considered her first major work known to the public.

" Known for her chameleon-like performance before her own lens, Matuschka could also be considered a modern-day anthropologist as she scrutinizes society and raises questions about identity, power, and sexuality in an image driven society. In her androgyny works, she capitalizes on an ability to perform various roles of gender – trading on stereotypes, she's quite convincing, so by the time we have figured out the masquerade, we also realize we have been taken by it." Joanne Leonard .

"Matuschka has been known to bring a critical eye, considered thought, contrivance, artifice, and farce into what have previously been exclusively within the domain of personal expression and is savvy enough to add humor and irony to the substance of her shots. The casual eroticism is at odds with the political content . Matuschka's work includes a nod to modern art: There is as much of Andy Warhol as there is of Dick Avedon in her photographs."- Rick Cusick,

Whether working with others, alone, or with an assistant, Matuschka is the author, director, make-up artist, hairstylist, wardrobe stylist, and master printer of the pictures she creates. Covering decades of figurative, photographic, and abstract expressionism rich in iconic imagery, her conceptual photographs are self-portraits, sometimes chemically toned or skillfully manipulated. Her works are in the collections of the Cooper Hewitt, Smithsonian Design Museum, New York; Cincinnati Art Museum, Ohio; and the Musee de I'Elyee Lausanne, Switzerland among many others.

==== Grassroots ====
In 1991, while undergoing chemotherapy, Matuschka discovered her mastectomy was unnecessary, that the doctor misread her pathology report and the lumpectomy he already performed was all the surgery required. She immediately turned her dismay with the medical profession into a unique form of activism. She began making posters and taking pictures of herself in a variety of 'styles' to bring greater attention to what was then called "The Silent Epidemic". Matuschka is credited with helping launch the breast cancer movement with her iconic self-portraits which attracted global attention beginning in 1991.

Matuschka joined many breast cancer groups including SHARE cancer support, 1 in 9, National Organization for Women (N.O.W)., National Alliance of Breast Cancer Organizations (NABCO) and Women's Health Action and Mobilization (W.H.A.M.!). Her alliance with W.H.A.M.! proved to be the most significant.

==== W.H.A.M.! ====
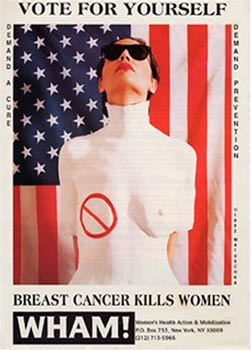
Vote for Yourself Poster 1992

Established in 1989, Women's Health Action and Mobilization (W.H.A.M.!) was an American activist organization based in New York City that employed direct actions to protest 'anti abortion sentiment', and endorsed pro-choice healthcare for both men and women. The group worked closely with the AIDS Coalition to Unleash Power (ACT UP) during the AIDS crisis. W.H.A.M.! become most famous in 1991 for draping the Statue of Liberty with a "pro-choice banner" (with the help of a loaned helicopter) the same year Matuschka joined the group. Matuschka spearheaded the Breast Cancer Action Movement (B.A.M.!) at W.H.A.M.!, and worked closely with Dr. Susan Shaw in designing a series of breast cancer awareness posters that would be distributed and wheat pasted on buildings, trucks and barricades in the greater New York Area.

Matuschka's first poster for the group was an illustration of the Statue of Liberty with the 'no' symbol painted over Lady Liberty's right breast. In 1992, W.H.A.M.! sponsored Matuschka's image Vote for Yourself as a glossy, eye-catching mass media poster. WHAMMERS, as they were known, wheat pasted this political poster at dozens of breast cancer rallies and demonstrations throughout the greater New York region. Fox Five News was the first mainstream media platform to air W.H.A.M.!'s breast cancer actions—using artwork created by Matuschka over a three-year period before pink ribbons became the symbol for the disease. A year later Vote for Yourself caught the attention of The New York Times photo editors.

=== The New York demonstrations: 1991–1994 ===
In 1991, the artist attended many rallies and demonstrations throughout the New York Area including: 1) The first Central Park Walk sponsored by SHARE (1991), 2) Central Park Run Sponsored by "Race for the Cure" (Susan G. Komen Foundation) (1991), 3) Central Park Demonstration sponsored by various grassroots groups (1992), 4) Riverside Rally sponsored by SHARE (1992) and 5) the Long Island Breast Cancer Coalition sponsored by 1 in 9 (1992) Great Neck Court House.

In 1992, Matuschka, along with W.H.A.M! were extensively filmed for a move entitled Part Time God by Dutch documentary film maker Paul Cohen. Part Time God is a visual essay about the seeming paradox between chance and free will in human life. The film, featuring Matuschka opened at the Dutch Documentary Film Festival in the Netherlands in 1992.

In May 1993, W.H.A.M.! sent Matuschka with a suitcase of political posters to the National Breast Cancer Coalition conference held in Washington D.C. to represent the group. Susan Ferrara, a writer from The New York Times, was covering the three-day event. On the last day of the convention, she spotted Matuschka wearing the Vote for Yourself on her body much like a sandwich board at a strike. Ms. Ferrara interviewed the artist for the article she would title: "The Politics of Breast Cancer".

That August, The New York Times decided to run Ms. Ferrara's article as a feature in their Sunday Times Magazine and needed an illustration for their cover. Art director Janet Froelich selected Matuschka's photo, Beauty out of Damage, showing her mastectomy and face—a decision that turned out to be controversial—and sparked debate about the treatment, awareness and depiction of breast cancer throughout the world.

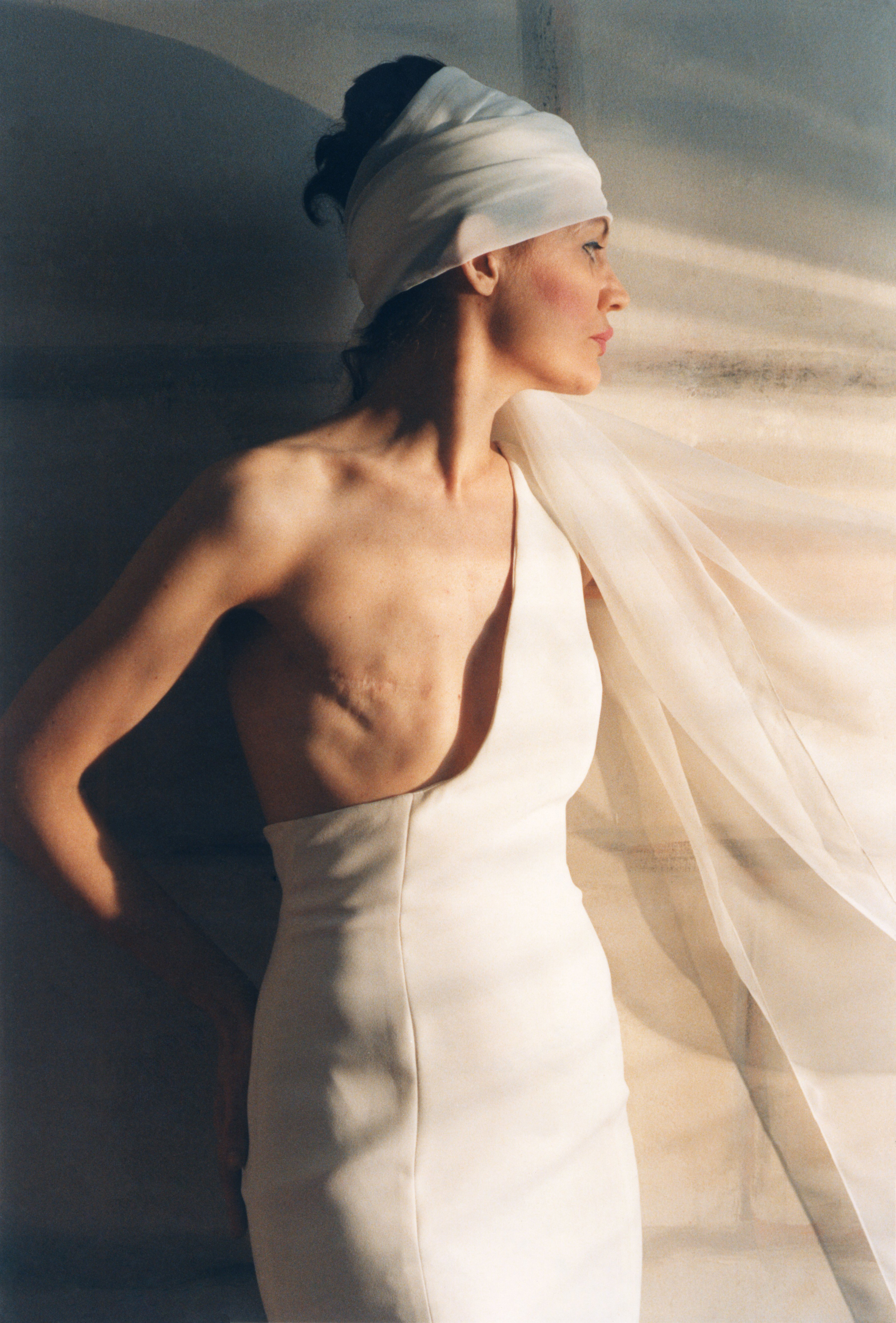
Beauty Out of Damage; Cover of the New York Times Sunday Magazine, August 1993

"Activists like Matuschka—a tall, striking artist in New York—set out to shock. As a member of a small group called W.H.A.M! (Women's Health Action and Mobilization), Matuschka makes art of her mastectomy with poster-size, one breasted self-portraits that force people to see what cancer does. Though some of her mainstream sisters are discomforted by the graphic images, they admire her determination. As she says, 'You can't look away anymore." — Susan Ferrara

This historical publishing decision made headline news for showing a "topless" cover girl on a mainstream magazine, and was viewed by many as ending the silence, shame and concealment for millions of women regarding their bodies and how they are portrayed by the media. Breast Cancer advocates and activists were here to stay, and the breast cancer movement had been officially launched.

After The New York Times Sunday Magazine was published, Matuschka participated in many demonstrations throughout the country, including one sponsored by The Harley Davidson Motorcycle Club of Manhattan in conjunction with the American Cancer Society, and another one organized by GreenPeace on the Rainbow Warrior Ship in 1995.

"It wasn't just her damaged chest but her resilient dignity which was so powerful." — Sandra Day O'Connor, Supreme Court Justice, Breast Cancer Survivor "Her cover did more for Breast Cancer than anyone else in the last 25 years." — Carol Spiro, President Breast Cancer Action, Ottawa Ontario, Canada

==== Greenpeace ====
In 1995, Greenpeace commissioned Matuschka to create a poster directed at Time Life to cease using chlorinated paper. Matuschka designed a poster similar to Vote For Yourself, which incorporated a cast of the artist's torso. The artist replaced her missing breast with a clock on the plaster cast, labeled the image Time For Prevention and created a facsimile of Time Magazine for the poster.

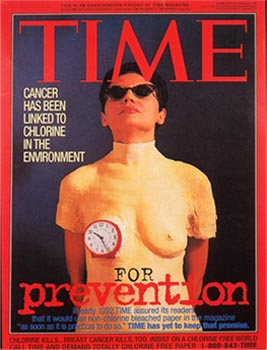
Matuschka's political poster addressing the use of chlorinated paper in printing. Faux magazine cover

Greenpeace sent Matuschka to the Great Lakes Region, where the Rainbow Warrior ship was docked to speak with civilians, to hand out these informative political posters. Greenpeace's effort to bring greater awareness to the link between chlorinated paper, dioxin and cancer was a huge success. Their crusade ended in NYC when members of Greenpeace scaled the Time Life building and were arrested. Massive media coverage included Matuschka's iconic poster, and the artist received numerous awards and citations. Additionally, these posters were wheat pasted throughout the country and used extensively in the "Chlorine Free" campaign initiated in the Great Lakes area. Time For Prevention is in the permanent collection of the Cooper Hewitt, Smithsonian Design Museum located in New York City, and won best environmental poster of 1996 by Graphis Inc.

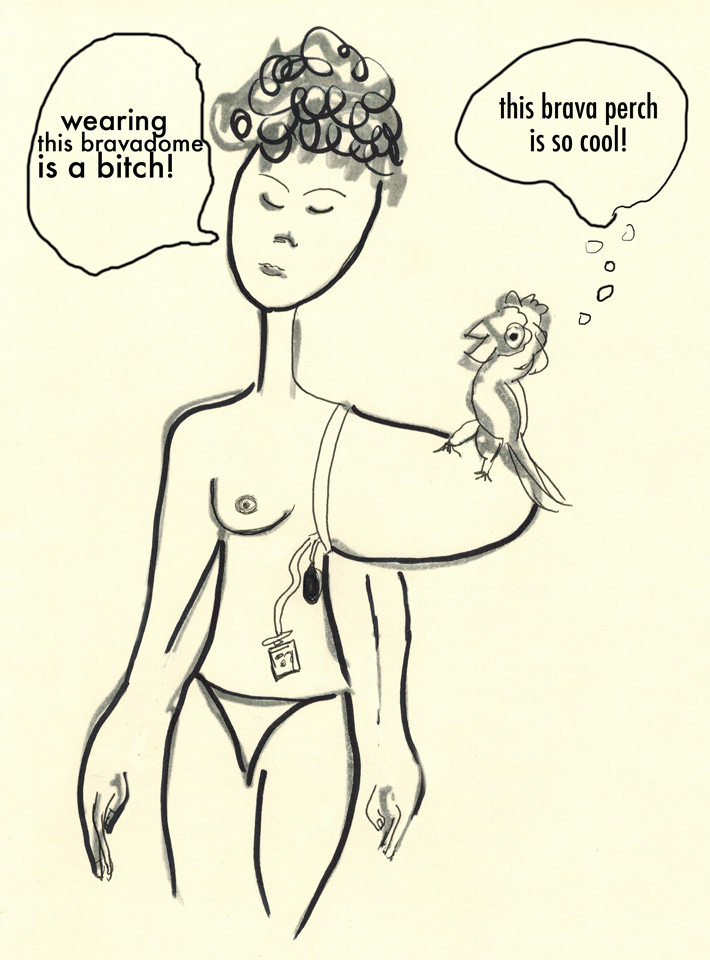
Parrot Perch, magic marker on 8" x 11" paper (2014)

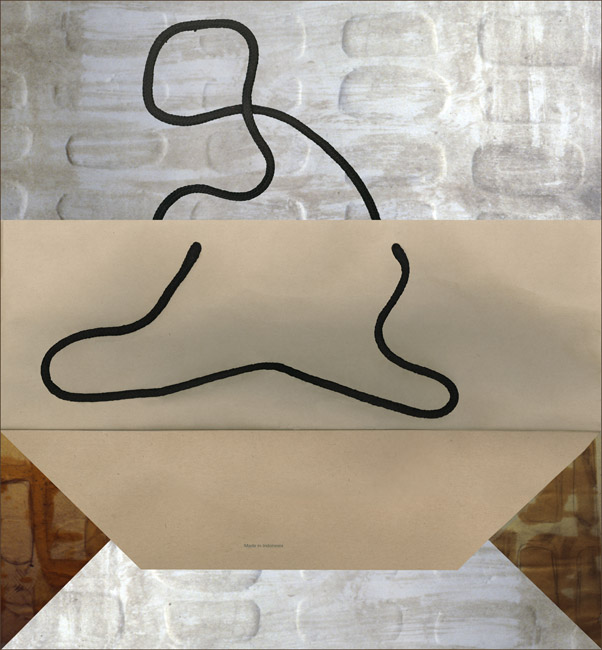
A work from the book Bagit! using a shopping bag and abstract art (1975 and 2006)

Following Matuschka's breast reconstruction, CBS News Sunday Morning (with Martha Teichner) aired a special program with her on September 23, 2013, titled The Model and the Mastectomy.

=== Painting (1970–2023) ===
Although known mostly as a photographer, model, and activist, Matuschka's abstract works on paper and large canvas remain a constant and essential element of her art. Since the turn of the century, she has returned to abstraction, her primary art form.

==== Bagit! ====
A book entitled Bagit!, with an introduction by Anthony Haden-Guest and published by Hard Press Editions, was released in 2009. The abstract art in this book pertains to shopping bags in which the artist has removed all branding, and replaced logos and labels with fine art. The sex appeal of luxury products and brand name obsession is based on the gospel of consumerism: "I am what I buy", or as Matuschka puts it: "you are what you bag."

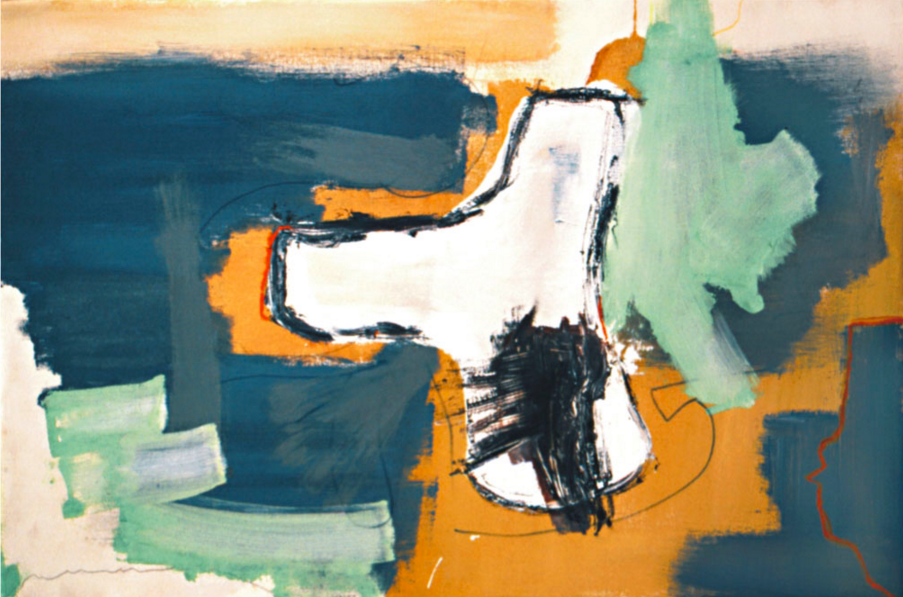
The Thing Before the Thing acrylic on canvas 28" x 18" (2001)

"In revisiting the world of abstraction and color she has also revisited her old stomping grounds, the Berkshires. And despite the fact that everybody knows her, it is incorrect to say they know her work, at least her current work." -Ed Bride, The Artful Mind 2006

She credits the artist Jennifer Bartlett, who taught her to be responsible for every square inch of the surface one's working on. When she began studying at SVA, she switched from figurative work to abstract painting. "I wouldn't have discovered my main infatuation, or jazz, if not for Jennifer", the artist once wrote.

“The very unalike images you see here are however alike in one highly specific way, which is that they connect directly to Matuschka's art-making beginnings, including her very earliest. The animate blobs, shapes and quasi-figural bits and pieces that populate her abstractions, for instance, owe a debt to a childhood fixation on the TV star, Soupy Sales, who would doodle haphazardly on a chalkboard as in a classroom, then ask his audience to seek out potential images of creatures or whatever lurking in his scribble-scrabble and complete them."- Anthony Haden Guest

== Health and activism ==
At the age of 37, she was diagnosed with breast cancer, undergoing a mastectomy and 6 months of chemotherapy. In 1991 Matuschka enrolled in the Kushi Institute, Beckett, Mass. and studied macrobiotics with Michio Kushi and Denny Waxman for 10 years.

In 1993 Matuschka successfully sued her breast cancer surgeon for malpractice for performing an unnecessary mastectomy. She claimed and proved that the doctor had given her incorrect information regarding her diagnosis. As the artist put it, "I lost a breast and the world gained an activist." She made case history, set a precedent and subsequent mastectomy malpractice lawsuits referred to Matuschka's case when settling breast cancer lawsuits.

In 2013, Matuschka underwent breast reconstruction surgery which was completed in 2016. This procedure required 6 hospitalizations and the use of the external Brava apparatus with extensive Fat Grafting over a three – year period.

== Lectures and workshops ==
Matuschka exhibits and gives workshops at Universities and Photo Festivals throughout the world. She has spoken at Harvard, Columbia, Yale, Museum of Art Fort Lauderdale, Florida and The Art Cultural Center (Malaga, Spain), among others.

== Permanent collections ==
- The Museum of the City of New York; NYC, NY
- The Cincinnati Museum for Art; Cincinnati, Ohio
- Musée de l'Élysée; Lausanne, Switzerland
- Cooper Hewitt, Smithsonian Design Museum; NYC, NY
- National Museum of Women in the Arts; Washington, DC
- Photographic Museum of Helsinki; Finland
- Hällisch-Fränkischen Museum; Schwäbisch Hall, Germany
- World Press Photo Foundation; The Netherlands
- Miniature Museum; Amsterdam
- Fleming Museum of Art; Burlington, Vermont
- Center for Photography at Woodstock; NY
- Center for the Study of Political Graphics; Los Angeles, CA
- Northwestern University; Evanston, IL
- Henry Buhl Foundation; NYC, NY
- Broadway Video Enterprises; NYC, NY
- Concord Hospital; Concord, New Hampshire

== Awards and honors ==
=== Special citations, honors and tributes ===
- Pulitzer Prize nomination, Feature Photography (1994)
- ABC Person of the Week, Worldwide News with Peter Jennings (1993)
- The Photographs (30 years of the New York Times most important photos published in the Sunday Magazine) edited by Kathy Ryan; Published by Aperture Foundation (NYC) (2011)
- Life Books Special Edition: 100 Photographs that Changed the World; Life Inc. (2003 and 2011)
- Edición de Aniversario SEMANA Magazine 30th Anniversary 30 Anos Imagines; Colombia, South America (2012)
- Bunte Magazine Tribute (Germany); "Women of the Nineties Who Changed the World" (1998)

=== Awards ===
- PEN Writers Grant(1978)
- Salmagundi Fellowship(1989)
- 1994
- Gold, People in the News; World Press Photo Foundation, the Netherlands
- Front Page Award; Newswomen's Club of New York
- Judges Special Recognition, Magazine Cover; Society of Newspaper Design
- Gold, Photojournalism Feature; Society of Newspaper Design
- Gold, Society Production Designers
- Silver, Art Director's Club
- Judge's Special Recognition, Cover; Society of Newspaper Design
- American Photography Top Ten
- Editorial Awards; Communication Arts Photography Annual
- Rachel Carson Award; Rachel Carson Institute, Chatham College, PA

1995

- Catalogue Grant; NYFA:New York Foundation for the Arts
- Design Merit; Potlatch Corporation
- Juror's Merit Award; Laguna Gloria Art Museum, TX

1996

- Gold, Photographs Only; The Visual Club, NYC
- Best Environmental Poster of the Year; Graphis Inc. Poster Annual
- NYC Fellowship; Art Matters Inc.
- Advertising and Design Club of Canada Honors
- Photographer's Fellowship; Center for Photography at Woodstock

1997

- How Design Annual Merits; Business Collateral
- PDN/Nikon Self Promotion Award; Photo District News
- Y2K Books: Certificate of Excellence; University of California Press (1998)

2000

- Javelina Award (Lifetime Achievement Award); Prescott College(2000)

2020

- Lucie Awards Finalist The Abstract Portrait Project Competition(2020)

=== Humanitarian Awards ===
- Citation; Borough of Manhattan President(1993)

1994

- Humanitarian Award; Mt. Sinai Hospital Service Club
- Mayoral Proclamation; City of Cincinnati
- Jonquils Award; Duke University, NC (Note: In 1994 Gene Wilder and Matuschka were notified they would be receiving the Jonquils Award from Duke University: due to prior commitments, neither were able to attend and the award was given to another.)

1995

- Gilda Radner Award; Wellness Community, Boston, MA
- Certificate of Recognition; California State Senator

1996

- Award for Activism; Joanne Rathgeb Memorial
- Certificate of Recognition; Kennedy Center Very Special Arts

=== Catalogues ===
- 1994: YWCA of Cincinnati (Award)
- 1996: Matuschka; New York Foundation for the Arts, NYFA (Award)
- 2011: ¿Heroínas o Víctimas?, Matuschka Fotografías 1991–2003; Fotomanias (Malaga Spain)

== Legacy ==
=== Exhibitions ===
Matuschka's work has been included in 93 international exhibitions, both solo and group, since 1972 including the New York Historical Society, Musée de l'Élysée, the Fratelli Alinari Museum of the History of Photography, The National Museum of Women in the Arts, Culturgest, The Frauen Museum, The New Art Center, The Salt Lake City Art Center, The World Press Photo Exhibition, The Montreal Museum of Fine Arts, The G. Ray Hawkins Gallery, the Jean Albano Gallery, the Hallisch-Frankischen Museum, Anthology Film Archives, Kulturkreis Höxter-Corvey Schloss GmbH, the Cooper Hewitt, Smithsonian Design Museum, the Center for Photography at Woodstock, The American Institute of Graphic Arts, The Parrish Art Museum, The Fleming Museum of Art, The Glenbow Museum, and the Cincinnati Art Museum.

Universities and colleges that have exhibited her work include The University of Michigan, Texas A&M University, University of the Arts (Philadelphia), Fordham University, University of Colorado Boulder, Southwest University of Visual Arts (formerly known as the Art Center Design College), Lyndon State College, Tulane University, University of Maryland, Baltimore County, Miami Dade College among others.

=== Covers ===
Matuschka's work has been featured on the cover of 26 magazines between 1988 and 2010. including The New York Times Sunday Magazine, Maclean's, P/F (Professional Photography), Foto Magazine, EMMA, News (Austria), Max (German), and Bad Girls and Sick Boys (published by UC Press).
