= Allan Combs =

American consciousness theorist

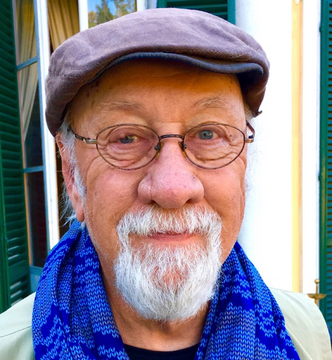

Allan Combs (6 November 1942 – 5 April 2025) is an American psychologist and parapsychologist who attempts to combine his ideas of consciousness and systems theory.

== Education and academic career ==
Combs attended Ohio University in the early 1960s, first studying physics and then switching to psychology. During these studies, he overcame impediments due to dyslexia, something he later noted would influence his thinking about psychology.

He then restarted his graduate education in clinical psychology at the University of Georgia, and at the same time started taking courses and doing research on single-cell recordings of neurons, and mathematically modeled their activity on early versions of the computer. Through this time he was reading Carl Jung, European phenomenology, Eastern spirituality Abraham Maslow, Carl Rogers, and John C. Lilly; he also participated in gestalt therapy and human potentials workshops.

After graduating he taught biology and psychology for a year at Earlham College in Indiana, then for about a decade at a small college in Missouri. While he was there he read Charles Tart and was inspired by his application of systems theory to psychology. In the early 1980s he moved to a college in North Carolina. In the mid-1990s he started corresponding and then collaborating with David Loye, who invited Combs to join a group formed around the ideas of Ervin László. Reading László furthered his interests in systems and consciousness and he was soon invited to join László's General Evolutionary Research Group. In 1989 Combs learned of the work of Frederick Abraham, who was beginning to meld chaos theory and psychology, and worked with him to found The Society for Chaos Theory in Psychology and the Life Sciences.

As of 2020 Combs held appointments at California Institute of Integral Studies, where he built the program in consciousness studies in 2015, and The Graduate Institute in Connecticut. He also was Professor Emeritus at the University of North Carolina-Asheville.

As of 2020 he had authored over 200 articles, chapters, and books on consciousness and the brain. Much of his work has been accomplished in collaboration with colleagues Ervin Laszlo and Stanley Krippner. He is also known for his collaboration with Ken Wilber.

He is the founder, Academic Advisor, and President Emeritus of The Society for Consciousness Studies, co-founder of The Laszlo Institute of New Paradigm Research and a member of the one-hundred member Club of Budapest. He is the Senior Editor of Consciousness: Ideas and Research for the Twenty First Century, co-editor of the Journal of Conscious Evolution, Associate Editor of Dynamical Psychology.

Combs won the National Teaching Award of the Association of Graduate Liberal Studies Programs for 2002/2003 and in the same year held the UNCA Honorary Ruth and Leon Feldman Professorship.
