= Jule Eisenbud =

American psychiatrist

- Born: November 20, 1908; Flatbush, New York
- Died: March 10, 1999 (aged 90); Denver, Colorado
- Education: Columbia College; Columbia Medical School
- Occupation: Psychiatrist
- Known for: Research into parapsychology
- Medical career
- Institutions: University of Colorado School of Medicine

Jule Eisenbud (November 20, 1908 – March 10, 1999) was an American psychiatrist, author and researcher known for his research into parapsychology.

He was born in Flatbush, New York on November 20, 1908. He received his B.A. from Columbia College, M.D. in 1934 from the Columbia College of Physicians and Surgeons, and his D.Med.Sc. in 1939 from Columbia University.

Eisenbud began private practice in psychiatry and psychoanalysis in 1938. In 1950, he and his family moved to Denver, where he was appointed Associate Clinical Professor of Psychiatry at the University of Colorado School of Medicine. He was also the first psychoanalyst to establish a private practice in Denver.

Although Eisenbud researched psychiatry, psychoanalysis, anthropology and hypnosis throughout his career, he was best known for pioneering investigations and theoretical writings in extra-sensory perceptions (ESP). He came to prominence through his book, The World of Ted Serios (1967), where he documented a series of experiments with Ted Serios, who claimed to produce dream-like images of his thoughts, on film. Although his work was met with criticism, his academic reputation shielded him from most criticism.

Eisenbud was a fellow of the American Psychiatric Association, a member of the American Psychoanalytic Association, and a charter member of the Parapsychological Association. He also founded the medical section of the American Society for Psychical Research with Drs. Jan Ehrenwald and Montague Ullman.

He died on March 10, 1999, in Denver.
