= Don Snyder =

American photographer and multimedia artist (1934-2010)

- Born: June 14, 1934; Brooklyn, New York
- Died: August 29, 2010 (aged 76); New York City, New York
- Occupation: Artist

Donald Roger Snyder (June 14, 1934 – August 29, 2010) was an American photographer and multimedia artist. Immersed in the social upheaval of the 1960s, he is best known for his iconic photographs of the counterculture, collected in his 1979 book Aquarian Odyssey: A Photographic Trip into the Sixties.

== Early life ==
Don Snyder was raised on Coney Island, which left an imprint on his art and creativity. He acquired a camera at an early age and spent his teenage years photographing families clustered on rock jetties or cavorting among the crowded lawn chairs, beach blankets, sun umbrellas, and sand castles. The gaudy race-track horses of Steeplechase and the red billowing cloud of the Parachute Jump also captured his photographic imagination, as did the multiple freak shows and sideshow facades on which he was paid to paint mermaids and monsters.

Still underage, Snyder began working in a narrow, cramped darkroom behind one of Coney Island’s “5 for a dollar” photo stalls, where he learned to rapidly process and print photos while customers waited impatiently in the alley for their prints. From 1948 to 1962, he combed the beach and shot more than 24,000 black and white photos with out-of-date World War II military film that he bought from a Coney Island hawker for pennies on the dollar. These photos comprised his first photographic opus, which he called Coney Island Inferno. Ralph Ginzburg’s art magazine, Eros, featured Coney Island Inferno images in its second issue. Photographs from the Inferno series were exhibited at the Municipal Art Society of New York in 1987.

Snyder attended Syracuse University where he met and was influenced by the radical ideas of artist Aldo Tambellini, who was then a graduate student teaching in the art department. His creative alliance with Tambellini continued after Snyder left Syracuse to study painting and photography at Cooper Union and enroll in Alexey Brodovitch’s Design Laboratory at The New School. When Tambellini moved to Manhattan, Snyder joined his emerging Group Center, an artists’ collective intent on challenging the hegemony of the art establishment

== Photography ==
In the late 1950s, Snyder began working for the fashion and advertising photographer Allan Arbus, developing and printing commercial photographs in Arbus’s darkroom. There he met and formed a friendship with Diane Arbus. Although she had already quit working at the studio, she often stopped by with photos she had just made on the streets of New York, and Snyder developed the film and made prints for her in his spare time. They traded photographs, and he continued to make occasional prints for her after he left Alan Arbus’s employ. They remained friends until her death in 1971.

During this early period, Snyder worked as a high-fashion photographer, and multiple examples of his creative fashion photography were published in his first book, Don Snyder’s World of Photography, which illustrated his innovations in lighting and special effects. He sold photographs as record jackets and book covers and they appeared in periodicals such as The Village Voice, the East Village Other, The New York Times, McCalls, Rolling Stone, Print Magazine, and Modern Photography, among others. He began receiving assignments from the prestigious hardcover quarterly Horizon and was sent to San Francisco in 1967 to photograph the emerging scene in Haight-Ashbury. A portfolio of Snyder’s portraits of flower children during the Summer of Love appeared in Horizon in 1968. Other Horizon portfolios followed, such as his portraits of prominent parapsychologists, including Montague Ullman and members of the Maimonides Dream telepathy Laboratory.

When documenting the social turmoil of the 1960s and 1970s, Snyder made portraits of many countercultural figures––among them Abbie Hoffman, Timothy Leary, Ram Dass, Lenore Kandel, Bobby Beausoleil, Allen Ginsberg, Yayoi Kusama, Arthur Kleps, Angus Maclise, Gerard Malanga, The Grateful Dead, and Janis Joplin. He captured the underground art scenes flourishing on both the East and West Coasts, and documented life in well-known countercultural communities. As one reviewer put it, "Look back on this era and you recall Woodstock, San Francisco’s Haight Ashbury, rock festivals, flower children, and the communes. In 1964, Snyder began an odyssey from coast to coast, capturing the mood in spectacular color. With camera in hand, he is just as much an artist as the man with the brush."

City life, with its club scenes and radical avant-garde art also drew Snyder’s attention. Using only available light, he made a series of photographs of The Living Theatre’s “Paradise Now,” and Angus MacLise’s opera “Orfeo.” He spent many all-night stints in Ira Cohen’s Mylar Chamber, photographing countercultural figures such as William Burroughs and Jack Smith and teaching Cohen the art of photography. Photographs from these sessions appear in Aquarian Odyssey, which The New York Times called: “a penetrating trip into the turbulent sixties in psychedelic color. This fascinating book is a basic primer for the street photographer interested in documenting life around him, and on what can be accomplished with a minimum of equipment and a maximum of imagination. It is a masterful treatise on shooting color in available light, revealing street candids, and a side-trip to fantasy land.”

== Multimedia ==
Meanwhile, Snyder was experimenting with multimedia art forms. In the early 1960s, he made a series of sepia, black and white, and brilliantly colored 2 1/4 x 2 1/4 in. slide-glass paintings with aniline dyes that were projected on a screen or on various three-dimensional surfaces. Jonas Mekas wrote about them in The Village Voice: “It is Don Snyder who is the Master of Slide Art. His slide photography merges completely with the medium of cinema, a kinesthetic experience of color and motion that should be judged not by the design of a single slide (frame) but by the patterns of visual impulses.” Snyder created elaborate multimedia shows in which his hand-painted slides were combined with dancers and experimental films. Howard Junker wrote in The Nation: “Don Snyder's psychedelic film-plus-slide show which beamed sometimes hallucinogenic, sometimes 'optical' images onto a translucent net screen in front of a screen wall made of whitewashed cardboard boxes which black vinyl clad dancers built and dismantled, sometimes waving the boxes to catch and disperse images. All this was in front of a shredded or venetian-blind screen. Many levels; very beautiful . . . the best of the festival.” In a multimedia collaboration with Angus MacLise, Snyder projected his slides on slowly spinning translucent disks of various sizes that were hung from the rafters of St. Peter’s Episcopal Church. He created Spectro-Mach I for the expanded cinema festival at The Film-Makers' Cooperative, and staged multimedia shows at other public venues such as The Millennium Film Workshop and The Electric Circus.

Snyder’s slides projected onto nudes were printed on an array of perforated stamps and included in issue No. 9 of the multimedia magazine, Aspen. His slide images formed the solar centers of Angus MacLise’s New World Solar Calendar (Fluxus Codex page 398). He was commissioned by Jean Houston and Bob Masters to create an altered-states multimedia chamber at their Foundation for Mind Research. The high-end fabric designer Jack Lenor Larsen reproduced a series of Snyder’s slides on innovative new fabrics, and Larsen presented the fabric line to fellow designers and members of the fashion industry in a multimedia light show created by Snyder. Slides chosen for the fabrics were projected on white-clad modern dancers as they undulated down the runway in the novel textures.

== Filmmaking ==
In 1966, Snyder spearheaded a professional company of 5 artists called The Adventures of Multimedia. The group soon garnered media spreads in newspapers and prominent magazines, and it was featured in primetime TV shows on WNBC and WNET. The group received a commission from Paraphernalia to make a film promoting its trendy new clothing line. Directed by Snyder, the film featured high-fashion models in mini-skirts skiing down Vermont slopes at night in a phantasmagorical display of Snyder’s slides, special effects, and fireworks. The Grove Press Film Collection described the film as “a Joycean delirium of colors and sounds. . . . This film produces an eerie and strikingly contemporary glimpse of Pop culture; a virtuoso blending of videos with audio.” The film was exhibited at the Museum of Modern Art in 1967.

During the 1960s and 1970s, Snyder made experimental films and collaborated with artists such as Shirley Clarke, who edited his kinescope video CHROMA, and Yayoi Kusama, filming her artistic orgies and other erotic “happenings.” He shot The Living Theatre; and collected hours of documentary footage at Timothy Leary’s Castalia Foundation in Millbrook. He was commissioned to make a feature-length film of experimental erotica for Maurice Girodias, which he shot in the Berkshires. His last known film was a documentary of Jack Smith starring in his original play, “Song for Rent.” The film was shown at the Museum of Modern Art in 2011 and is in the museum’s permanent collection.

== Sculpture ==
Sculpture was a medium Snyder also liked to work in. His works of sculpture were first exhibited at the LENA sculpture shows at St. Mark’s Church in-the-Bowery. His huge triplicate panels of the Apollo 11 Moon landing were shown in the Queens Museum exhibition, Television’s Impact on Contemporary Art. The Magic Circle Exhibition at the Bronx Museum of Art included Snyder’s polarized light box.

== Timothy Leary and the Castalia Foundation ==
In 1965, Snyder met and formed a close association with Timothy Leary, producing multimedia shows for Leary that reflected his psychedelic philosophy and ideas. During 1965–67, Snyder spent considerable time at the Hitchcock Estate in Millbrook, New York, filming and preparing multimedia audiovisuals they called “The Psychedelic Moment” for Leary’s drug free weekend seminars and Fillmore East shows. Many intimate portraits of Leary and his family members were included in Aquarian Odyssey. Snyder’s iconic photograph depicting Leary as Christ “sitting” on the water with his arms raised in crucifixion position was shot in Millbrook and appeared on the front page of The Village Voice in 1974.

== Teaching ==
Snyder taught at the School of Visual Arts (SVA) from 1974 to 1980, passing along his innovative photographic expertise in courses such as: Lensless Photography, Photo-Rayograms, Secrets of Light, Multimedia Photography and Filmmaking, Experiments with Light, Special Effects Photography, Painting with Light, Light Graphics, Darkroom Graphics, After the Darkroom, and Introduction to the Spectrum of Light and Photography.

== Automobile accident and death ==
Snyder’s professional career was cut short in the summer of 1980 when he was in a catastrophic automobile accident and suffered a major brain concussion and shattered hip. His head had to be cut from the roof of the car with the Jaws of Life. As a consequence of the accident, he was obliged to turn down photographic assignments and book offers, and forced to give up teaching. His recovery was slow and his injuries plagued him for the rest of his life. Although he pursued his creative endeavors, he became more reclusive and seldom left his studio in Chelsea. Snyder’s health gradually deteriorated and he died of a massive heart attack in his studio on August 29, 2010.
