= Dream telepathy =

Telepathic communication through dreaming

Dream telepathy is the purported ability to communicate telepathically with another person while one is dreaming. Mainstream scientific consensus rejects dream telepathy as a real phenomenon. Parapsychological experiments into dream telepathy have not produced replicable results. The first person in modern times to claim to document telepathic dreaming was Sigmund Freud. In the 1940s, it was the subject of the Eisenbud-Pederson-Krag-Fodor-Ellis controversy, named after the preeminent psychoanalysts of the time who were involved: Jule Eisenbud, Geraldine Pederson-Krag, Nandor Fodor, and Albert Ellis.

== History ==
The notion and speculation of communication via dreaming was first mooted in psychoanalysis by Sigmund Freud in 1921. He produced a model to express his ideas about telepathic dreaming. His 1922 paper Dreams and Telepathy is reproduced in the book Psychoanalysis and the Occult (1953) and was intended to be a lecture to the Vienna Psycho-Analytical Society, although he never delivered it. Freud considered that a connection between telepathy and dreams could be neither proven nor disproven. He was distinctly suspicious of the whole idea, noting that he himself had never had a telepathic dream. (His two dreams that were potentially telepathic, where he dreamed of the deaths of a son and of a sister-in-law, which did not occur, he labeled as "purely subjective anticipations".) His ideas were not widely accepted at the time, but he continued to publicly express his interest and findings about telepathic dreaming. He also observed that he had not encountered any evidence of dream telepathy in his patients. Freud claims neutrality about the phenomenon itself, states that the sleep milieu has special likely properties for it if it does exist, and discounts all of the cases presented to him on standard psychoanalytic grounds (e.g. neurosis, transference, etc.).

In the 1940s, Jule Eisenbud, Geraldine Pederson-Krag and Nandor Fodor described alleged cases of dream telepathy. Albert Ellis regarded their conclusions to have been based upon flimsy evidence, and thought that they could be better explained by bias, coincidence and unconscious cues than by dream telepathy. He also accused them of an emotional involvement in the notion, resulting in their observations and judgement being clouded. Psychologist L. Börje Löfgren also criticised dream telepathy experiments of Eisenbud. He stated that coincidence was a more likely explanation and the "assumption of paranormal forces to explain them is unnecessary."

== Experiments ==
There have been many experiments done to test the validity of dream telepathy and its effectiveness, but with significant issues of blinding. Many test subjects find ways to communicate with others to make it look like telepathic communication. Attempts to cut off communication between the agent, sender, and receiver of information failed because subjects found ways to get around blindfolds no matter how intricate and covering they were. In studies at the Maimonides Medical Center in Brooklyn, New York led by Stanley Krippner and Montague Ullman, patients were monitored and awakened after a period of REM then separated to study the claimed ability to communicate telepathically. They concluded the results from some of their experiments supported dream telepathy.

The picture target experiments that were conducted by Krippner and Ullman were criticized by C. E. M. Hansel. According to Hansel there were weaknesses in the design of the experiments in the way in which the agent became aware of their target picture. Only the agent should have known the target and no other person until the judging of targets had been completed; however, an experimenter was with the agent when the target envelope was opened. Hansel also wrote there had been poor controls in the experiment as the main experimenter could communicate with the subject.

An attempt to replicate the experiments that used picture targets was carried out by Edward Belvedere and David Foulkes. The finding was that neither the subject nor the judges matched the targets with dreams above chance level. Results from other experiments by Belvedere and Foulkes were also negative.

In 2003, Simon Sherwood and Chris Roe wrote a review that claimed support for dream telepathy at Maimonides. However, James Alcock noted that their review was based on "extreme messiness" of data. Alcock concluded the dream telepathy experiments at Maimonides have failed to provide evidence for telepathy and "lack of replication is rampant."

The psychologist and noted skeptic Richard Wiseman took part in a dream telepathy experiment. It was conducted by Caroline Watt at a sleep laboratory in an attempt to replicate the results of Krippner and Ullman. The experiment was a complete failure. According to Wiseman, "after monitoring about twenty volunteers for several nights on end, the study didn't discover any evidence in support of the supernatural."

== See also ==
- Astral projection
- Collective unconscious
- Lucid dreaming
- Oneironautics
- Parapsychology
