= Ted Serios =

Self-proclaimed psychic

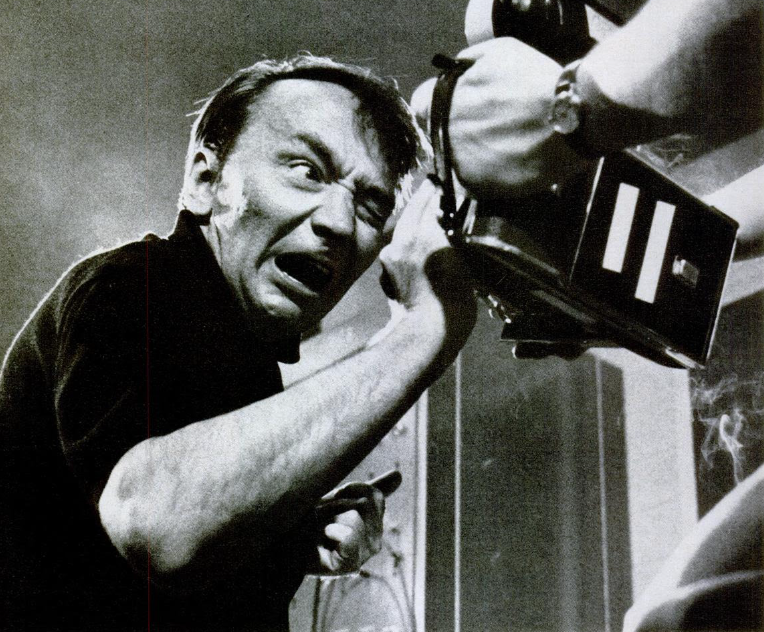
- Born: Theodore Judd Serios; November 27, 1918; Chicago, Illinois, United States
- Died: December 30, 2006 (aged 88); Quincy, Illinois
- Occupations: Bellhop, psychic

Theodore Judd Serios (November 27, 1918 – December 30, 2006) was a Chicago bellhop known for his production of "thoughtographs" on Polaroid film. He claimed these were produced using psychic powers. Serios's psychic claims were bolstered by the endorsement of a Denver-based psychiatrist, Jule Eisenbud (1908–1999), who published a book named The World of Ted Serios: "Thoughtographic" Studies of an Extraordinary Mind (1967) arguing that Serios's purported psychic abilities were genuine. However, professional photographers and skeptics have argued that Serios and his photographs were fraudulent.

== History and method ==
Serios was an unemployed bellhop when his claims that he had the ability to put images on film with his mind came to the attention of psychiatrist Jule Eisenbud. He was tested by Eisenbud at Denver during a period of three years. Serios usually held a small cylinder or tube he called a "gizmo" up to the lens of an instant camera, which was then pointed at his forehead and the shutter released. He would often be drunk, or at least have been drinking, when he produced his photographs, as can be seen for instance in his appearance on the TV show In Search Of.

Serios's images were most often blank or black. Occasionally, a fuzzy image would be seen that could be interpreted in many different ways, but on rare occasions a relatively clear and identifiable image showed up although often appearing surrounded by dark areas on the film. On some occasions, his photos appeared to be distorted, or altered versions of real places or images, e.g., one such photo seemed to be of Eisenbud's ranch showing the barn as a different structure from the reality. Another photograph depicted part of a building identified later as a hangar belonging to the Air Division of the Royal Canadian Mounted Police. Eisenbud attempted to prove that previously unidentified photographs were actually of the surface of Ganymede. In Eisenbud's own words, "Unfortunately, I couldn't get an astronomer or optical scientist to agree."

== Psychology ==
According to Eisenbud, "Ted Serios exhibits a behavior pathology with many character disorders. He does not abide by the laws and customs of our society. He ignores social amenities and has been arrested many times. His psychopathic and sociopathic personality manifests itself in many other ways. He does not exhibit self-control and will blubber, wail and bang his head on the floor when things are not going his way." Serios was described as an alcoholic.

== Critical reception ==
LIFE magazine presented a lengthy article about Serios in 1959, its writer having met Serios four years earlier in Chicago; several of the Polaroid images were shown: "Ted's big test with us came when we arranged for him to perform for a research group associated with one of the most highly respected photographic institutions in the country. Ted was ecstatic. 'This is it, Paul,' he said on the plane coming east. 'I'll show 'em. After these cats look me over, people will have to believe.' On the ride back to Chicago, however, he wept. He had not been able to even fog the film."

In an article in the October 1967 issue of the magazine Popular Photography, Charlie Reynolds and David Eisendrath, both amateur magicians and professional photographers, claimed to have exposed Serios as a fraud after spending a weekend with him and Eisenbud. Reynolds and Eisendrath said they spotted Serios slipping something into the tube that Serios claimed he needed to help him concentrate. They surmised this was a picture of something that the camera would take an image of, but which Serios would claim came from his mind rather than his hand. Robert Todd Carroll later wrote "after the exposure he remained virtually unheard from for the past 30 years."

In 1968, W. A. H. Rushton, a professor of physiology and president of the Society for Psychical Research, rejected any paranormal interpretation of the photographs. He suggested that it was light that formed the photographs from a luminous picture placed in front of the camera lens hidden in the 'gizmo'. Rushton successfully replicated the Serios phenomenon by holding a little reflecting prism that contained a microfilm picture against the camera lens.

James Randi, stage magician and noted scientific skeptic, took an interest in investigating Serios. Randi claimed Serios used "a simple handheld optical device" to perform his photographic trickery. Randi wrote he replicated the trick of Serios on a live television show in New York and Eisenbud was "flabbergasted". According to Terence Hines:

Serios would use what he called a "gizmo," a tube of paper placed against the camera lens. He said this helped him to focus his mental energy and direct it toward the film. He also used something he didn't tell anyone about—a tiny tube about one inch long and one-half inch in diameter. This tube had a tiny magnifying lens at one end. In the other end one could insert a piece cut from a standard 35mm slide. Lined up properly, this device projected the image on the cut piece of transparency onto the film of the Polaroid camera. The device was small enough to be concealed in the palm of the hand, so it could be used even when the larger paper "gizmo" wasn't around to conceal it.

In an article in New Scientist titled "The Chance of a Lifetime" (24 March 2007), an interview appears with the noted mathematician and magician Persi Diaconis. During the interview Diaconis mentioned that Martin Gardner had paid him to watch Ted Serios perform, during which Diaconis claimed that he caught Serios sneaking a small marble with a photograph on it into the little tube attached to the front of the camera he used. "It was," Diaconis said, "a trick." Gardner wrote that "the parapsychologists who once took Ted Serios and others like him seriously would have been spared their embarrassments had they known anything about magic."

== Popular culture ==
Thoughtography was the premise of The X-Files 1996 episode "Unruhe", and was obliquely referred to in the 1994 episode "Born Again". The X-Files producer Chris Carter signed a deal to base a film on Dr. Eisenbud's book. Serios was also featured and interviewed (along with Eisenbud, Reynolds and Eisendrath) on the seventh episode of Arthur C. Clarke's World of Strange Powers in 1985, where he unsuccessfully tried to replicate his earlier thoughtography sessions - albeit without the use of his "gizmo". Serios was earlier featured in the television series In Search of... in the episode "Ghosts In Photography" in 1980.

Serios and thoughtography were highlighted in a 2014 episode of Mysteries at the Museum (Season 6, Episode 13). Serios is one of the mediums in French author Nathalie Quintane's 2014 novel Descente de médiums and is mentioned as footnote 3 in Mark Z. Danielewski’s 2000 novel House of Leaves.

== See also ==
- Chizuko Mifune
