= Varieties of Anomalous Experience =

2000 book on psychology

- Author: Editors: Etzel Cardeña; Steven Jay Lynn; Stanley Krippner
- Published: 2000 (American Psychological Association)
- Media type: Print
- Pages: 476
- ISBN: 978-1-55798-625-2

Varieties of Anomalous Experience: Examining the Scientific Evidence is a book edited by Etzel Cardeña, Steven Jay Lynn and Stanley Krippner and published by the American Psychological Association. The first edition was published in 2000 and a second edition in 2014. The book is dedicated to the research of William James.

The authors of the book explore "anomalous experiences" defined as unusual but not necessarily psychopathological phenomena that may hold great significance for those who have them. The book focuses on psychological and neuroscientific research on the experiences, rather than on their ontological nature, and includes near-death experiences, out-of-body experiences, hallucinations, lucid dreams, mysticism, psi-events, and reincarnation. The second edition has 14 chapters written by twenty-two contributors. It has a clear and readable style which makes it suitable for a general audience.

== See also ==
- Extra-Sensory Perception
- Parapsychology: Frontier Science of the Mind
- The Conscious Mind
- Irreducible Mind
