= Prescott College =

Private liberal arts college in Prescott, Arizona, United States

- Former name: Prescott Center for Alternative Education
- Motto: Community, adventure, and advocacy live here
- Type: Private college
- Established: 1966; 60 years ago
- President: Dan Garvey (incoming January 2026)
- Students: 969 (fall 2022)
- Undergraduates: 313 (fall 2022)
- Postgraduates: 656 (fall 2022)
- Doctoral students: 70 (fall 2018)
- Location: Prescott, Arizona, United States
- Campus: Rural
- Colors: Tan and Teal
- Sporting affiliations: USA Cycling
- Website: www.prescott.edu

Prescott College is a private college in Prescott, Arizona, United States.

== History ==
Prescott College was founded in 1966 after a conference titled "Emergence of a Concept". Conveners Charles Parker and the Ford Foundation brought together leaders from Arizona and the nation to envision education serving communities in the 21st century. The purpose of this event was to create a "Harvard of the West" that would be "unfettered by any tradition that would limit its opportunity to relate itself dynamically to the emerging 21st century".

The college was originally built in 1966 on 200 acres (0.81 km^{2}) outside of Prescott, Arizona. In 1974 the college went bankrupt due to poor fiscal management and the loss of anticipated donor funds. The original campus was purchased by Embry–Riddle Aeronautical University, Prescott. A core of determined faculty and students refused to see the college fold, and after a series of emergency meetings, formed the Prescott Center for Alternative Education. This earned the school national publicity as "The College That Wouldn't Die".

During the spring semester of 1975, classes were held in the basement of the historic Hassayampa Hotel in downtown Prescott, Arizona, as well as in the homes of both faculty and students. Over the succeeding years, the college was able to regain the legal right to the name Prescott College and acquire property and buildings for its main campus. Prescott College has an agroecology program at Jenner Farm, an international center in Bahía Kino, Sonora, Mexico, programs in regenerative design in partnership with the Ecosa Institute, the Prescott College Art Gallery at Sam Hill Warehouse and the college also has a Tucson, Arizona location.

Most of the Prescott location buildings are repurposed buildings, converted to classrooms from stores and offices. The Village residence hall has a townhouse style housing groups of 7–8 students with shared common areas. The Crossroads Center is built from reclaimed timber, Corten steel, compressed earth with solar panels and rooftop gardens. It houses the Crossroads Cafe, classrooms, meeting facilities, the Fanon Center, the college library, and computer labs.

== Academics ==
There are four general degree programs at Prescott College: the Resident Undergraduate Program (RU), Limited-Residency Undergraduate Program (LRU), the Resident Masters and Limited-Residency Masters Program (RM/LRM), and a Limited-Residency Ph.D. program (PhD) in Sustainability Education.

Within the resident undergraduate program, students can earn a Bachelor of Arts, a Bachelor of Science, or a Bachelor of Fine Arts.

Resident students live in Prescott and attend classes at the main campus. Students enrolled in the limited residency program work with community based mentors and Prescott College faculty.

Prescott College was an early adopter of prior learning assessment and in 2014 was certified as a Veteran Supportive Campus by the Arizona Department of Veterans Services. It was the first private college in Arizona to receive such a designation. The college uses the system of narrative evaluation in addition to or as a substitute for the conventional grading system of A-F letter grades.

=== Resident undergraduate degree program ===
Resident undergraduate students begin with a three-week orientation in Arizona's wilderness, known as wilderness orientation. In their first week, students are introduced to the college and gather supplies before being sent out in groups of 7–14 people, depending on the size of the incoming class. The average distance covered varies from 50–100 miles. There are also options for a community-based orientation where students explore and are educated about their surrounding environment.

=== Limited residency degree programs ===
Students may also choose the limited residency program which allows one to attend a colloquium (or series of such) on campus once a year, work with a primary faculty adviser and a mentor(s) who is usually based in the student's home community. This allows for the student to study from home in a community based setting. Programs are offered for the bachelor's degree, the master's degree and even a Ph.D using this limited residency model.

=== Degree plan ===
Students design a degree plan by the beginning of their junior year. Prescott College students fulfill basic requirements (such as math and writing) and then design their competence (like a major) and breadth (like a minor). The degree plan is submitted to the student's individual graduation committee (IGC) for review. The IGC consists of at least one faculty member and another faculty member and a student if desired. The committee will then edit and suggest classes that are needed to enhance and complete the plan.

A student's course of study will fall under one of the following: Adventure Education (AE), Arts and Humanities (AH), Education (EDU), Environmental Studies and Sustainability (ESS), Psychology and Counseling (PSC) or Cultural and Regional Studies (CRS).

=== Resident undergraduate senior project ===
To graduate from the college, each student must design and complete a senior project. Some examples include: The creation of Butte Creek Restoration Council, HUB (helping understand bicycles), The Ripple Repeat Project (campus thrift store), The Latin American Studies Scholarship Endowment Fund, The Freedom of Education Fund, an internship relevant to a student's Competence, or a research paper. A student must rigorously justify the project as proof of competence in their field of study.

== Accreditation ==
Prescott College is accredited by the Higher Learning Commission and the Association for Experiential Education.

The college's teacher education program is approved by the Arizona State Board of Education and the National Association of State Directors of Teacher Education and Certification (NASDTEC).

The Master of Science in Counseling is accredited by the Council for Accreditation of Counselor and Related Educational Programs (CACREP).

== Consortium relationships ==
Prescott College has stand-alone student exchange relationships with Telemark University College in Norway, the Ecosa Institute in Prescott, the SOS Conservation Project, and Sail Caribbean, that permit students to study as visitors at other institutions while maintaining enrollment and paying tuition to Prescott.

Prescott College is a member of the EcoLeague, a six-college consortium of liberal arts colleges dedicated to ecologically focused education, and to modeling sustainability through their operations and facilities: Alaska Pacific University, Green Mountain College (now closed), New College of Florida in Florida, Northland College, and College of the Atlantic and, since January 2014, Dickinson College in Pennsylvania. The consortium is unique in that each college is in a different geographic area.

== Student life ==
In fall 2012, the college completed a $7.4M on-campus sustainable housing project, the Village, to accommodate up to 104 first-year students. The Village is a LEED Platinum certified facility that consists of 13 new multi-story townhome style apartment units, for up to eight students in each three-level unit. Most other students reside in nearby apartments, condos, and houses.

From 2013–2016 Prescott College rented out one of its Village buildings to Embry-Riddle University.

In 2016 a student-led initiative resulted in the acquisition of the Frantz Fanon Community Strategy Center for use for student and community organizing and club meetings. Groups that currently meet in the Frantz Fanon Community Strategy Center include the Queer Student Union, The Advocates for Responsible Sexual Culture, the Black Student Union, Mi Familia (a Latino and indigenous group), Yavapai County Planned Parenthood, and others. These clubs have successfully organized many events and demonstrations at Prescott College, and in the community. The Frantz Fanon Community Strategy Center also includes a zine library, a food pantry, a kitchen, and multiple classroom spaces.

Prescott College Activists were also able to successfully institute a $30 semester fee to support the Freedom Education Fund scholarship for undocumented immigrants seeking to attend university. Prescott College President John Flicker has said of this project "I am proud that our students take on the role of scholar activists".

The college also has a Student Activity Center (SAC) which is used by a variety of individual students and clubs to hold meetings and interact. The space is also utilized for the Student Union Board (SUB) meetings and includes a lounge area, kitchen area and the Max and Bessie Bakal Memorial Lounge and Library.

=== Athletics ===
Prescott College has a mountain biking team registered with USA Cycling that offers scholarships. Most athletics are intramural in general, since the college curriculum is centered on field-based immersion courses.

== Notable alumni ==
- Cody Lundin, professor and reality TV star
- Matuschka, photographer and artist
- Todd Miller, journalist
- Gary Paul Nabhan, ethnobotanist
- Charlene Pesquiera, politician
- Lisa Popeil, singer and vocal coach
- Kathleen Stephens, former US ambassador to South Korea
- Tom Udall, former United States Senator from New Mexico, former U.S. Ambassador to New Zealand and Samoa
