= Jan Ehrenwald =

Czech-American psychiatrist and psychotherapist

- Born: March 13, 1900
- Died: June 15, 1988 (aged 88)
- Education: University of Prague
- Known for: Work on parapsychology, extrasensory perception, and psychoanalysis
- Notable work: Telepathy and Medical Psychology (1948); From Medicine Man to Freud (1956); The ESP Experience: A Psychiatric Validation (1978)
- Scientific career
- Fields: Psychiatry, psychotherapy, parapsychology
- Workplaces: University of Vienna; University Hospital of Brooklyn at Long Island College Hospital; State University of New York

Jan Ehrenwald (13 March 1900 – 15 June 1988) was a Czech-American psychiatrist and psychotherapist, most known for his work in the field of parapsychology. His work largely focused on extrasensory perception and its supposed implications for psychoanalysis.

== Career ==
Ehrenwald studied medicine at the University of Prague. He taught psychiatry at the University of Vienna (1927–1931), University Hospital of Brooklyn at Long Island College Hospital (1948–1950) and State University of New York (1950–1953). He was a member of the Society for Psychical Research and was a fellow of the New York Academy of Medicine.

== Reception ==
Ehrenwald's belief that telepathy had been successfully demonstrated was not accepted by the scientific community. Critics state that Ehrenwald's statements were based on conjecture, not solid facts.

His research was well received by parapsychologists. Arthur Deikman, J. B. Rhine and Ian Stevenson have positively reviewed Ehrenwald's books.

== Works ==
- Telepathy and Medical Psychology, W. W. Norton, 1948
- From Medicine Man to Freud, 1956
- Psychotherapy: Myth and Method, 1966
- New Dimensions of Deep Analysis, 1975
- History of Psychotherapy: From Magic Healing to Encounter, Jason Aronson, 1976
- The ESP Experience: A Psychiatric Validation, 1978
