= Etzel Cardeña =

Mexican psychologist

Etzel Cardeña (born 9 November 1957) is the Thorsen Professor of Psychology at Lund University, Sweden where he is Director of the Centre for Research on Consciousness and Anomalous Psychology (CERCAP). He has served as President of the Society of Psychological Hypnosis, and the Society for Clinical and Experimental Hypnosis. He is the current editor of the Journal of Parapsychology. He has expressed views in favour of what he terms "an open, informed study on all aspects of consciousness" and the validity of some paranormal phenomena. The Parapsychological Association honored Cardeña with the 2013 Charles Honorton Integrative Contributions Award. His publications include the books Altering Consciousness and Varieties of Anomalous Experience.

== History ==
Etzel Cardeña is the Thorsen Professor of Psychology (including parapsychology and hypnosis) at Lund University, Sweden where he is Director of the Centre for Research on Consciousness and Anomalous Psychology (CERCAP). A native of Mexico, Cardeña studied at the Universidad Iberoamericana in México and completed an MA in clinical psychology at York University in Toronto, Canada and an MA and PhD in Personality Psychology at the University of California, Davis. His doctoral thesis under the supervision of Charles Tart was on the phenomenology of deep states of hypnosis. He subsequently went on to do post-doctoral work in the area of dissociation and hypnosis at Stanford University under David Spiegel. Cardeña has held academic posts at Georgetown University, the Uniformed Services University of the Health Sciences (USUHS) and the University of Texas–Pan American, among others. He has served as President of the Society of Psychological Hypnosis (APA Division 30) for 2000–2001, the Society for Clinical and Experimental Hypnosis for 2001–2003, and the Parapsychological Association for the year 2008–2009. He has expressed views in favour of the validity of some paranormal phenomena. In a 2018 paper in American Psychologist he wrote that "The evidence for psi is comparable to that for established phenomena in psychology and other disciplines, although there is no consensual understanding of them."

In a series of interviews with Swedish Newspapers he has said that there is evidence for telepathy, psychokinesis and precognition and that he himself has had experiences that could be interpreted as supporting the psi hypothesis. The Parapsychological Association honored Cardeña with the 2013 Charles Honorton Integrative Contributions Award. Cardeña has written more than 300 publications. His edited book Varieties of Anomalous Experience: Examining the Scientific Evidence published in 2000 and a second edition in 2014 is a scholarly volume on anomalous experiences. His two volumes Altering Consciousness discusses the importance of altered states across history, culture, and in many disciplines including philosophy, anthropology, psychology, biology, and various others.

In addition to his professional work in psychology Etzel Cardeña is the artistic director of the International Theatre of Malmö and has worked in theatre as a director, actor and playwright in Mexico, the US and Sweden. He did graduate studies in theatre directing at the University of California, Davis, after having worked professionally in theatre in México and been offered scholarships from the Polish and Canadian governments to do graduate work in acting.

== Publications ==
Scientific publications include more than 250 journal articles and book chapters in journals such as Annual Review of Clinical Psychology, American Journal of Psychiatry, Journal of Abnormal Psychology, Archives of General Psychiatry, and Cortex, and the following books:

- Kirsch, I., Capafons, A., Cardeña, E., & Amigó, S. (Eds.) (1999). Clinical hypnosis and self-regulation therapy: A cognitive-behavioral perspective. Washington, DC: American Psychological Association.
- Cardeña, E., Lynn, S. J., & Krippner, S. (Eds.). (2000). Varieties of Anomalous Experience: Examining the scientific evidence. Washington, DC: American Psychological Association. 2nd ed. (2014) Washington, DC: American Psychological Association.
- Cardeña, E., & Croyle, K. (Eds.) (2005). Acute reactions to trauma and psychotherapy: A multidisciplinary and international perspective. New York: Haworth Press. Also published as special issue of the Journal of Trauma & Dissociation, 6(2).
- Cardeña, E., & Winkelman, M. (2011). Altering consciousness. Multidisciplinary perspectives. Volume I. History, culture, and the humanities; Volume II. Biological and psychological perspectives. Santa Barbara, CA: Praeger Publishers.
