= SHARE Cancer Support =

Volunteer organization for breast and ovarian cancer support

SHARE: Self-help for women with breast or ovarian cancer
- Type: Non-Profit
- Founded: 1976 in New York City
- Founder: Dr. Eugene Thiessen
- Headquarters: 1501 Broadway, Suite 704A; New York, NY 10036
- Key people: Jacqueline Reinhard (Executive Director); Didi Lacher (President)

SHARE is a peer support organization in New York City in the US State of New York of women affected by breast or ovarian cancer. SHARE is a volunteer organization. Volunteers and staff who are breast or ovarian cancer survivors operate telephone hotlines, lead support groups, and offer an array of educational services in 18 sites and in every borough of New York City. SHARE does not charge for any of its services, and has been praised for "their extensive outreach programs to underserved communities in New York City." The organization cooperates with several major hospitals in the New York City area.

== History ==
SHARE was founded in 1975 by cancer specialist Dr. Eugene Thiessen as an informal support group for 12 women with breast cancer. Two years later, SHARE was incorporated as a not-for-profit organization in New York State.

In 1994, LatinaSHARE was founded to provide support, information, education and advocacy opportunities for people who feel more comfortable communicating in Spanish.

By 1995, the organization began offering services for women with ovarian cancer.

In 2007, SHARE expanded services specifically for women with metastatic breast cancer. The next year, the New York Department of Health issued this statement while announcing a grant to SHARE and nine other community-based breast cancer education, counseling, outreach and support services:

Support groups, education, counseling and related activities can help reduce stress experienced by breast cancer patients, improve their ability to cope and deal with the uncertainties, challenges and life complications that accompany the disease and also enable them to make more effective use of health services. Breast cancer survivors may have a myriad of clinical and psychosocial needs, and support services have been shown to improve their quality of life.

== Peer support ==
A philosophy of peer support guides SHARE activities. Its web site states, "We are breast and ovarian cancer survivors and we're here to help you." A survivor and later volunteer published this first person account of the peer support process:

"I was scared to death," she says, "because I had to make so many major decisions about breast reconstruction, hormonal treatments, possible chemotherapy, and everything else. My knowledge of breast cancer was only that it happened to other women, not me." But communicating her fears, and realizing that other women had similar worries and stories to share, was empowering. "I know that this sounds hokey," Nancy says, "but when I sat in that room, for the first time I felt like I was going to live and that I was not alone. Sitting in a room full of women who were dealing with the same issues, who were also scared to death, gave me strength." Likewise, Nancy says, her communication with a peer match counselor—a volunteer from the SHARE hotline who also had DCIS—was inspiring: "She shared her story with me, and it gave me hope."

The benefits of emotional support to women with breast cancer have been acknowledged in the medical literature.

== Global activities ==
According to the United Nations World Health Organization, more than 500,000 people worldwide die from breast cancer every year, and breast cancer is the leading cause of cancer deaths among women worldwide. Recognizing the need for women to help each other to deal with the impact of this disease, SHARE volunteers have assisted in creating similar peer-support organizations in Israel and the Czech Republic.

== Public policy ==
SHARE seeks to play an active role in shaping the public policy agenda related to breast and ovarian cancer. Breast cancer is the second leading cause of cancer-related death among women in New York State, and nearly 14,000 New York State women are newly diagnosed with breast cancer each year, and approximately 3,000 die from the disease annually. SHARE hopes to reduce these numbers by advocating for health resources and awareness.

== Events ==
SHARE sponsors "A Second Helping of Life," an annual event since 2003, in which many of the top female chefs in New York City converge in a giant tasting party to benefit SHARE. Among the chefs participating in 2009 were:

Rebecca Charles (Pearl Oyster Bar), Anita Lo (Annisa & Rickshaw Dumpling Bar), Gina DePalma (Babbo) and Alex Guarnaschelli (Butter). Guest Chefs will include Dana Cowin of Food & Wine Magazine, Ruth Reichel of Gourmet, and stars of the stage and screen such as broadcasting mavens including Samantha Mathis, Robin Mattson Ellen Parker, Bravo "Top Chef Masters" host, Kelly Choi, and TV personality Sara Moulton.

In 2009, Chef Lo competed in the TV show Top Chef Masters with SHARE as the named beneficiary of her $20,000 winnings.
