= Stanley Krippner =

American parapsychologist

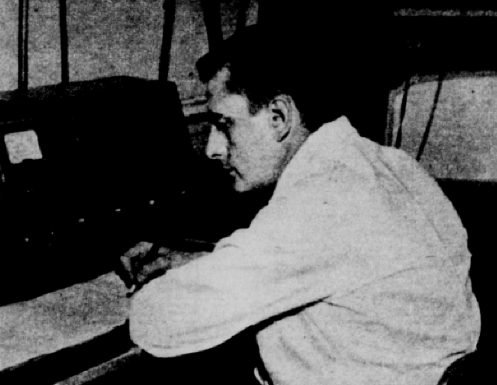
- Krippner at his dream laboratory in 1969
- Born: October 4, 1932 (age 94)
- Occupations: Psychologist; parapsychologist; writer

Stanley Krippner (born October 4, 1932) is an American psychologist and parapsychologist. He received a B.S. degree from the University of Wisconsin–Madison in 1954 and M.A. (1957) and Ph.D. (1961) degrees from Northwestern University.

From 1972 to 2019, he was an executive faculty member and the Alan Watts Professor of Psychology at Saybrook University in Oakland, California. Formerly, Krippner was director of the Kent State University Child Study Center (1961-1964) and director of the Maimonides Medical Center Dream Research Laboratory in Brooklyn, New York (1964-1972).

Following his time at Saybrook, he continued on as an Associated Distinguished Professor at the California Institute of Integral Studies, professor of psychology at Akamai University, and as a research professor at the California Institute for Human Science, which he helped found in 1992.

== Biography ==
Krippner has written extensively on altered states of consciousness, dream telepathy, hypnosis, shamanism, dissociation, and parapsychological subjects. Krippner was an early leader in Division 32 of the American Psychological Association (APA), the division concerned with humanistic psychology, serving as President of the division from 1980–1981. He also served as president of division 30, the Society for Psychological Hypnosis, and is a Fellow of five APA divisions. Krippner has conducted experiments with Montague Ullman into dream telepathy at the Maimonides Medical Center. In 2002, Krippner won the APA Award for Distinguished Contributions to the International Advancement of Psychology.

== Maimonides ESP Dream Studies ==
The dream laboratory at the Maimonides Medical Centre was established in 1962, and Krippner joined the staff in 1964 as the first dream telepathy studies were commencing. The design of the first experiment had already been established at this point, by Montague Ullman and Sol Feldstein. In total Krippner, Ullman and Alan Vaughan list ten dream telepathy experiments in their 1973 book Dream Telepathy, beginning with the first screening study in the summer of 1964 and ending with "The Second Bessant Study".

All ten experiments involved an 'agent' who would attempt to transmit the contents of an image to the sleeping target, usually an art print. Krippner, Ullman and Vaughan concluded that the majority of these studies produced statistically significant results, with the exception of three which did not. One of the better known studies involved a single subject, dream researcher Robert Van de Castle, and took place over 8 discontinuous nights over the course of 1967. This is the experiment which was later detailed and criticized by C. E. M. Hansel (see 'Reception' below).

== Notable collaborations and relationships ==
=== Timothy Leary ===
In September 1961, at the annual convention of the American Psychological Association in New York, Krippner attended a panel featuring Timothy Leary, William Burroughs, Frank Barron, and Gerald Heard on psilocybin and other psychoactive substances. Following the panel, he wrote a letter to Leary expressing his desire to volunteer as a test subject for the Harvard Psilocybin Project. In March 1962, he traveled to Harvard University to participate in a session of the experiment organized by Leary. Krippner took a 30-milligram psilocybin tablet, and afterwards reported his experience of the 'trip' to Leary. He has stated that this session led to his subsequent lifelong research interest in psychedelics, including a chapter in the 1968 book The Psychedelic Artist. Krippner remained in contact with Leary from 1962 until Leary's death in 1996, and attended Leary's wedding to Nena von Schlebrügge in December 1964. In 1965 he wrote a summary of several of Leary's psilocybin experiments for the journal Etc: A Review of General Semantics, in which he discussed the benefits of psychedelics in helping distinguish the "maps" formed by words from the "territory" of the experiential world.

=== The Grateful Dead ===
Krippner was introduced to Mickey Hart, one of the drummers for the Grateful Dead, at a birthday party for Alla Rakha in New York in 1967. Hart wanted to ask him about hypnosis, and its potential to improve his drumming. This meeting led to a long relationship between Krippner and the band. Krippner would hypnotize Hart and fellow drummer Bill Kreutzmann, in order to help them better sync their drumming. In 1971, the Grateful Dead collaborated with Krippner on a series of six "ESP Shows" at the Capitol Theatre in New York. At some point during the concert, slides projected on a screen above the stage would advertise to concertgoers that “YOU ARE ABOUT TO PARTICIPATE IN AN ESP EXPERIMENT”, then show them a picture and encourage them to use ESP to send the picture to a man named Malcolm Bessent, sleeping at the Maimonides lab 45 miles away. Krippner published the results of these "experiments" in an article titled An experiment in dream telepathy with "The Grateful Dead" in the Journal of the American Society of Psychosomatic Dentistry and Medicine. A pair of judges were asked to match each of Bessent's six dream reports against each of the 6 images shown to the concert crowd, and score the similarity out of 100. Krippner reported in his article that the "correct" pairs received the highest ratings for 4 of the 6 images.

=== Alan Watts ===
Krippner first met Alan Watts in 1962 when he travelled to Harvard to participate in Leary's Psilocybin Project. At Leary's invitation he attended a dinner in honour of Watts, having previously read Watts' The Way of Zen. They were subsequently reintroduced by a mutual friend, Virginia Glenn. The two became friends and professional peers, and gave lectures and workshops together. Krippner credits him for contributing to his interest in Buddhism, Taoism and Hinduism, and in 1966 Watts conducted a Buddhist wedding for Krippner and his partner Lelie Harris. Watts and Krippner also collaborated on campaigning for marijuana decriminalization, with Watts joining an advocacy committee created by Krippner which organised events and wrote to public officials.

=== Rolling Thunder ===
In 1970 Krippner was introduced to medicine man Rolling Thunder by Grateful Dead drummer Mickey Hart. Krippner subsequently invited him to the 3rd annual Council Grove Conference on the Voluntary Control of Internal States, where he introduced him to the audience. This has been described as the formal introduction of shamanism into the transpersonal psychology movement, although Rolling Thunder never described himself as a shaman. The two remained friends and occasionally presented together, including with Alan Watts at New Mexico State University in 1972. Krippner also became friends with Rolling Thunder’s grandson, Sidian Morning Star Jones, and the two of them co-authored a biography The Voice of Rolling Thunder in 2012.

== Reception ==
=== Dream telepathy ===
In 1973, Krippner co-authored a book Dream Telepathy with Montague Ullman and Alan Vaughan, which detailed among other studies the results of dream telepathy experiments he conducted along with other researchers at Maimonides Medical Center. The summary of the Maimonides chapter concludes that the "procedure produced statistically significant results indicating the telepathic effects had been produced in the subjects' dreams". Krippner followed this book up with other writings on the Maimonides experiments, for example a 1993 article in the Journal of Parapsychology. The experiments have not been consistently replicated. In a review of the research published in American Psychologist, professor Irwin Child, former head of the Department of Psychology at Yale University, concluded that 'the tendency toward hits rather than misses cannot reasonably be ascribed to chance'. But this favorable commentary has been criticized by a number of reviews and respondents, who argued that Krippner's work like most parapsychology severely lacked in rigor and instituting proper controls against bias.

In 1985, psychologist C. E. M. Hansel criticized the picture target experiments that were conducted by Krippner and Ullman. According to Hansel, there were weaknesses in the design of the experiments in the way in which the agent became aware of their target picture. Only the agent should have known the target and no other person until the judging of targets had been completed, however, an experimenter was with the agent when the target envelope was opened. Hansel also wrote there had been poor controls in the experiment as the main experimenter could communicate with the subject. In 2002, Krippner denied Hansel's accusations claiming the agent did not communicate with the experimenter.

An attempt to replicate the experiments that used picture targets was carried out by Edward Belvedere and David Foulkes. The finding was that neither the subject nor the judges matched the targets with dreams above chance level. Results from other experiments by Belvedere and Foulkes were also negative.

In 2003, Simon Sherwood and Chris Roe wrote a review that claimed support for dream telepathy at Maimonides. However, James Alcock noted that their review was based on "extreme messiness" of data. Alcock concluded the dream telepathy experiments at Maimonides have failed to provide evidence for telepathy and "lack of replication is rampant." However, in 2017 the same authors, along with Lance Storm, Patrizio E. Tressoldi, Adam J. Rock, and Lorenzo Di Risio, published an expanded meta-analysis of dream studies from 1966-2016, concluding with much the same wording as their 2003 review that "Combined effect sizes for both Maimonides and post-Maimonides studies suggest that judges may be able to use dream mentations to identify target materials correctly more often than would be expected by chance."

=== Psychics ===
Krippner has drawn criticism for endorsing the feats of a Russian psychic Nina Kulagina. Science writer Martin Gardner found it surprising that Krippner took interest in Kulagina despite knowing that she was a "charlatan" who was caught on two occasions using tricks to move objects. Krippner took issue with this statement believing it to be an attack on himself and wrote there was "no suggestion of trickery." However, psychologists Jerome Kravitz and Walter Hillabrant have noted that she was "caught cheating more than once by Soviet Establishment scientists." Gardner later commenting on Kulagina stated that she utilized invisible threads to move objects.

Krippner has contributed to and co-edited Future Science: Life Energies and the Physics of Paranormal Phenomena (1977). It included an essay from the parapsychologist Julius Weinberger, who claimed to have communicated with the dead by using a Venus flytrap as the medium. Philosopher Paul Kurtz criticized the book for endorsing pseudoscience.

Magician and noted skeptic Henry Gordon has written:

A reading of Krippner's book, Human Possibilities, published by Doubleday, convinced me that there is a man sincere in his beliefs in the paranormal and bending over backward to be fair and open minded but incredibly naive. In his book he endorses the feats of several psychics who have already been exposed as frauds.

Krippner co-edited and contributed to Debating Psychic Experience (2010). He also co-edited and contributed to Varieties of Anomalous Experience (2013) which has received positive reviews.

== Awards and honors ==
- 1998 – Outstanding Career Award, Parapsychological Association.
- 2002 – Award for Distinguished Contributions to Professional Hypnosis, Society of Psychological Hypnosis (American Psychological Association Division 30).
- 2002 – APA Award for Distinguished Contributions to the International Advancement of Psychology.
- 2006 – Lifetime Achievement Award, International Association for the Study of Dreams.
- 2013 – Award for Distinguished Lifetime Contributions to Humanistic Psychology, Society for Humanistic Psychology (American Psychological Association Division 32).
- 2019–2020 – Lifetime Achievement Award, Society for Ritual Arts.

== Selected Bibliography ==
Krippner's writings span around sixty years, beginning in the 1960s. He has both authored and edited titles, as well as contributed chapters to edited volumes. He has written on various topics, including altered states of consciousness, hypnosis, shamanism, dissociation, psychedelics and parapsychological subjects.

Year	Title	Author(s) / Editor(s)	Publisher	Topic	Role	Type	Ref.
1968	The Psychedelic Artist	Krippner, S.	Grove Press/Balance House Books.	Psychedelics	Author	Chapter	
1973 (2023)	Dream Telepathy: The Landmark ESP Experiments (50th Anniversary Edition)	Ullman, M., Krippner, S., & Vaughan, A. (Eds.)	Afterworlds Press (originally published 1973)	Dream Telepathy	Author	Book	
1976	Hypnosis as Verbal Programming in Educational Therapy	Krippner, S.	Charles C Thomas	Hypnosis	Author	Chapter	
1988	Personal Mythology: Using Ritual, Dreams, and Imagination to Discover Your Inner Story (3rd edition was titled The Mythic Path)	Feinstein, D., & Krippner, S.	Jeremy P. Tarcher, Inc. (First edition)	Altered States of Consciousness	Author	Book	
1997	Broken Images, Broken Selves: Dissociative Narratives in Clinical Practice	Krippner, S., & Powers, S. (Eds.)	Brunner/Mazel	Dissociation	Editor	Book	
2000	Varieties of Anomalous Experience	Krippner, S., Cardeña, E, & Lynn, S.J. (Eds.)	American Psychological Association	Altered States of Consciousness	Editor	Book	
2002	Extraordinary Dreams and How to Work with Them	Krippner, S., Bogzaran, F., & de Carvalho, A. P.	State University of New York Press	Dream Telepathy	Author	Book	
2004	Psychology of Shamanism	Krippner, S.	ABC-CLIO	Shamanism	Author	Chapter	
2010	Mysterious Minds: The Neurobiology of Psychics, Mediums, and Other Extraordinary People	Krippner, S., & Friedman, H.L. (Eds.)	Praeger	Altered States of Consciousness	Editor	Book	
2010	The Cultural Context of Hypnosis	Cardeña, E., & Krippner, S.	APA Books	Hypnosis	Author	Chapter	
2010	Debating Psychic Experience: Human Potential or Human Illusion?	Krippner, S., & Friedman, H.L. (Eds.)	Praeger	Parapsychological Subjects	Editor	Book	
2011	Demystifying Shamans and Their World: A Multidisciplinary Study	Rock, A., & Krippner, S.	Imprint Academic	Shamanism	Author	Book	
2012	Post-Traumatic Stress Disorder: Biographies of Disease	Krippner, S., Pitchford, D.B., & Davies, J.	Greenwood/ABC-CLIO	Dissociation	Author	Book	
2016	The Shamanic Powers of Rolling Thunder	Jones, S.M.S., & Krippner, S. (Eds.)	Bear & Co.	Shamanism	Editor	Book	
2021	Advances in Parapsychological Research, Vol. 10	Krippner, S., Rock, A.J., Friedman, H.L., & Zingrone, N.L. (Eds.)	McFarland	Parapsychological Subjects	Editor	Book	
2021	Understanding Suicide's Allure: Steps to Save Lives by Healing Psychological Scars	Krippner, S., Riebel, L., Joffe Ellis, D., and Paulson, Daryl S.	Praeger	Suicide	Author	Book	
2024	A Chaotic Life: The Memoirs of Stanley Krippner (3 Volumes)	Krippner, S.	University Professors Press	Humanistic Psychology	Author	Book	
