= Montague Ullman =

American psychiatrist (1916–2008)

- Born: September 9, 1916
- Died: June 7, 2008 (aged 91)
- Known for: Study of dreams
- Scientific career
- Fields: Parapsychology, psychiatry

Montague Ullman (September 9, 1916 – June 7, 2008) was a psychiatrist, psychoanalyst and parapsychologist who founded the Dream Laboratory at the Maimonides Medical Center in Brooklyn, New York and for over three decades promoted public interest in dreams and dream sharing groups.

== Biography ==
Ullman received his Bachelor of Science degree from the College of the City of New York in 1935 and graduated from the New York University School of Medicine in 1938. Ullman completed training in neurology and psychiatry and, after returning from military service, entered private practice in 1946. He completed his psychoanalytic training at the New York Medical College and served on the psychoanalytic faculty of that institution for 12 years, beginning in 1950. In the 1960s he pursued psychosomatic research in dermatology at the Skin and Cancer Unit of Bellevue Hospital and was associated with the Bellevue Stroke Study for four years. In 1961 he also founded one of the first sleep laboratories in New York City at the Maimonides Medical Center, devoted to the experimental study of dreams and telepathy.

Ullman resigned from Maimonides in 1974 and, since then, was engaged in work on dreams and dreaming. He was in the forefront of the movement to stimulate public interest in dreams and to encourage the development of dream sharing groups. Working in a small group setting that he believed to be both safe and effective, Ullman spent the last three decades of his life leading such groups both in the United States and overseas.

Ullman was also Clinical Professor of Psychiatry Emeritus at Albert Einstein College of Medicine and was a president of both the Parapsychological Association and of the American Society for Psychical Research. He served on the Council of Advisors for the Dream Network Journal from 1990 to 1994, and was honoured with a special edition of the journal in 2006 "A Tribute to Monte Ullman".

== Reception ==
Ullman's dream telepathy experiments have not been independently replicated. James Alcock has written the dream telepathy experiments of Ullman and Stanley Krippner at Maimonides have failed to provide evidence for telepathy and "lack of replication is rampant."

The picture target experiments that were conducted by Krippner and Ullman, were criticized by C. E. M. Hansel. According to Hansel there were weaknesses in the design of the experiments in the way in which the agent became aware of their target picture. Only the agent should have known the target and no other person until the judging of targets had been completed, however, an experimenter was with the agent when the target envelope was opened. Hansel also wrote there had been poor controls in the experiment as the main experimenter could communicate with the subject.

An attempt to replicate the experiments that used picture targets was carried out by Edward Belvedere and David Foulkes. The finding was that neither the subject nor the judges matched the targets with dreams above chance level. Results from other experiments by Belvedere and Foulkes were also negative.

== Books ==
- Ullman, Montague & Zimmerman, Nan. Working with Dreams, Los Angeles: Jeremy P. Tarcher Inc., 1979.
- Ullman, Montague & Limmer, Claire (editors). The Variety of Dream Experience, Second edition. New York: State University of New York Press, 1999.
- Vaughan, Alan; Ullman, Montague & Krippner, Stanley. Dream Telepathy. New York: Macmillan, 1973.
- Ullman, Montague. Appreciating Dreams - A Group Approach, Sage Publications, Thousand Oaks, California, 1996; republished by Cosimo Books, New York, 2006.

== See also ==
- Dream interpretation
- Dream telepathy
