= Hoodoo (spirituality) =

Spiritual practices, traditions and beliefs

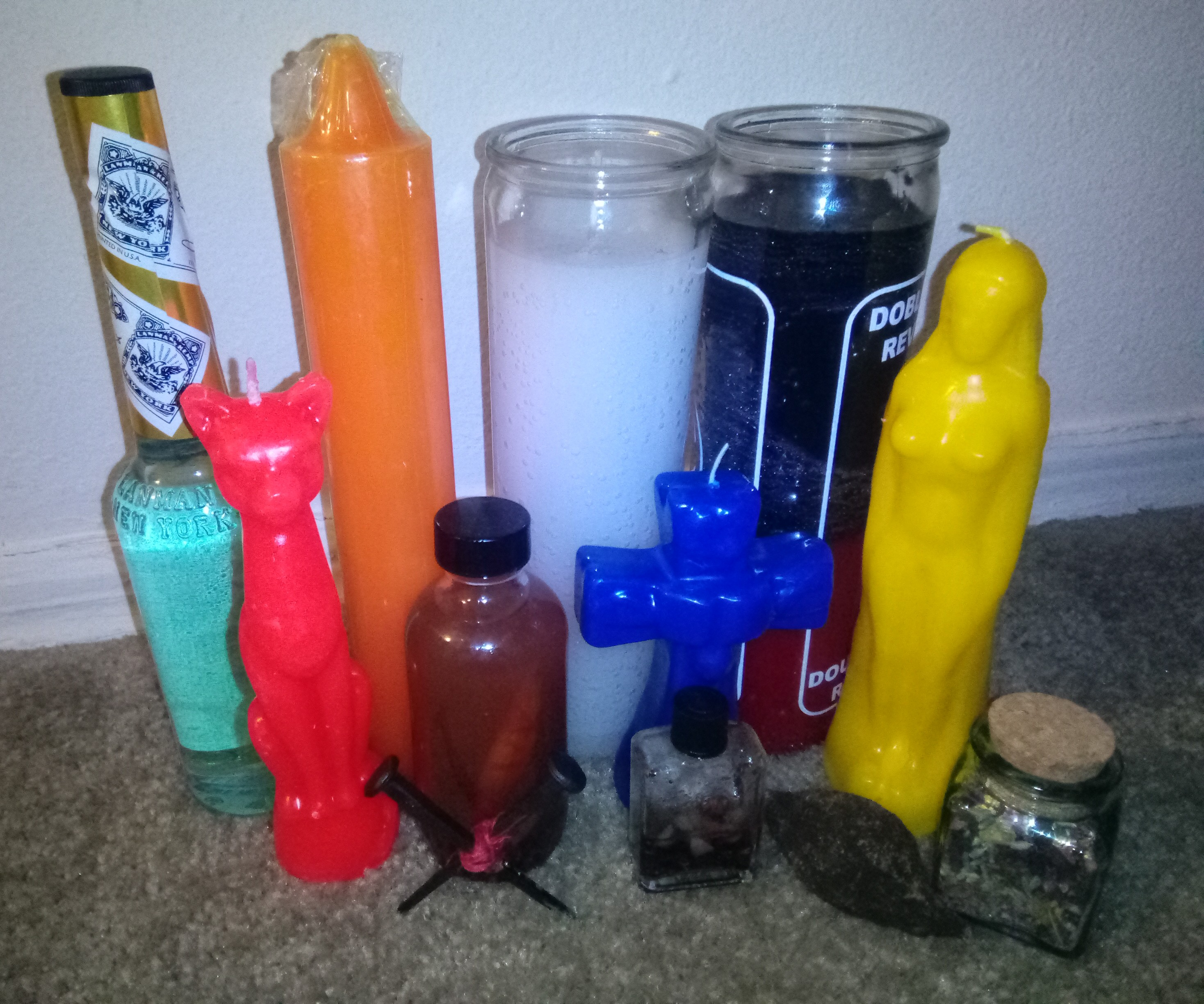
- Type: Afro-Diasporic religion
- Region: United States: American South, The Carolinas, The Lowcountry, Sea Islands, Gullah Geechee Corridor, Gulf Coast, Louisiana, Tidewater, Arkansas, Alabama, Tennessee, Affrilachia, East Texas, Georgia, Mississippi, Philadelphia
- Language: English, Gullah, AAVE, Louisiana Creole, Tutnese
- Members: Black Southerners
- Other names: Lowcountry Voodoo; Gullah Voodoo; Rootwork; Conjure; Hudu; Juju

Hoodoo is a complex set of spiritual observances, traditions, and beliefs—including magical and other ritual practices—developed by enslaved African Americans in the Southern United States from various traditional African spiritualities and elements of Native American ethnobotany. Hoodoo practitioners are called rootworkers, conjure doctors, conjure men or conjure women, and root doctors. Regional synonyms for Hoodoo include roots, rootwork and conjure. As an autonomous spiritual system, it has often been syncretized with beliefs from religions such as Islam, Protestantism, Catholicism, and Spiritualism.

Hoodoo, frequently associated with conjure, is a compilation of religious beliefs and practices, centered on showing gratitude to deceased family members, justice, and rootwork, a botanical practice used for healing and protection. It is mostly influenced by West African spiritual practices, incorporating Indigenous herbalism and European grimoires. While there are a few academics who believe that Hoodoo is an autonomous religion, those who practice the tradition maintain that it is a set of spiritual traditions that are practiced in conjunction with a religion or spiritual belief system, such as a traditional African spirituality and Abrahamic religion.

Many Hoodoo traditions draw from the beliefs of the Bakongo people of Central Africa. Over the first century of the trans-Atlantic slave trade, an estimated 52% of all enslaved Africans transported to the Americas came from Central African countries that existed within the boundaries of modern-day Cameroon, the Congo, Angola, Central African Republic, and Gabon.

== Etymology ==
The first documentation of Hoodoo in English appeared in 1870. Its origins are obscure. Still, some linguists believe it is an alteration of Voodoo 'divinity', which originated in the Gbe languages such as the Ewe, Adja, and Fon languages of Ghana, Togo, and Benin.

Another possible etymological origin is the Ewe Hudu (lit. 'spirit work'); Hudu is one of its dialects.

Recent scholarly publications capitalize Hoodoo. The word has different meanings depending on spelling: some authors capitalize Hoodoo to distinguish it from commercialized hoodoo, which is spelled with a lowercase h. Other authors have different reasons why they capitalize or lowercase the first letter.

According to African American religion professor Yvonne P. Chireau, the lexicon that came to be associated with conjuring in the United States "emanated from West and Central African linguistic antecedents". For example, gris-gris is a Mande word of the Windward Coast and Senegambia, mojo bag can be traced to the Kikongo words wanga and mooyo, and juju bags are believed to have an origin amongst the Hausa people in Nigeria and Niger. The use of the Hausa word juju later became prevalent across other countries to which the ethnic group immigrated.

== History ==
=== Antebellum era ===
Many Hoodoo practices were hidden in Black churches during and after slavery for African Americans to protect themselves. Scholars call the practice of Hoodoo in Black churches the invisible institution because enslaved Black people concealed their culture and practices from whites within the Christian religion.

Yvonne Chireau stated: "Hoodoo is an African American-based tradition that makes use of natural and supernatural elements in order to create and effect change in the human experience." Hoodoo was created by African Americans, who were among over 12 million enslaved Africans from various Central and West African ethnic groups transported to the Americas from the 16th to 19th centuries as part of the transatlantic slave trade. Between 1619 and 1860 approximately 500,000 enslaved Africans were transported to the United States, including after it was made illegal in 1808. The America's Black Holocaust Museum puts the number of slaves taken to America at 388,000, approximately 2.5% of all those taken from Africa. From Central Africa, Hoodoo has Bakongo magical influence incorporating the Kongo cosmogram, Simbi water spirits, and Nkisi and Minkisi practices. It also has West African influence, including Vodun from the Fon and Ewe people in Benin and Togo, following some elements from the Yoruba religion.

After contact with European slave traders and missionaries, some Africans converted to Christianity willingly. Simultaneously, other enslaved Africans were forced to become Christian, resulting in a syncretization of African spiritual practices and beliefs with Christianity. Enslaved and free Africans learned regional indigenous botanical knowledge after they arrived in the United States. The extent to which Hoodoo could be practiced varied by region and the temperament of enslavers. For example, the Gullahs of the coastal southeast experienced an isolation and relative freedom that allowed the retention of various traditional West African cultural practices. Among Gullahs and enslaved African Americans in the Mississippi Delta, where the concentration of enslaved people was dense, Hoodoo was practiced under an extensive cover of secrecy, due to slave codes prohibiting large gatherings of enslaved and free Black people. Enslavers experienced how slave religion ignited slave revolts among enslaved and free Black people, and some insurrection leaders were Black ministers or conjure doctors.

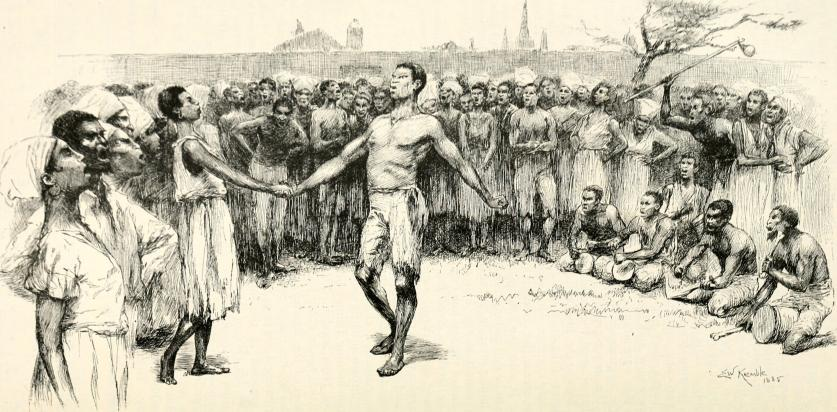
During the slave trade, the majority of Central Africans imported to New Orleans, Louisiana, were Bakongo people. This image was painted in 1886 and shows African Americans in New Orleans performing dances from Africa in Congo Square, where African Americans practiced Voodoo and Hoodoo.

The Code Noir, implemented in 1724 in French colonial Louisiana, regulated the lives of enslaved and free people and prohibited enslaved Africans from practicing traditional religions; Article III states: "We forbid any public exercise of any religion other than Catholic". This and other slave laws resulted in enslaved and free African Americans conducting spiritual practices in secluded areas such as woods (hush harbors) and churches. Slaves created methods to decrease their noise when they practiced their spirituality. In a slave narrative from Arkansas, enslaved people prayed under pots to prevent nearby white people from hearing them. John Hunter, a formerly enslaved person in Arkansas, said the enslaved people went to a secret house only they knew and turned the iron pots face up so enslavers could not hear them. They would place sticks under wash pots about a foot from the ground because "[I]f they'd put it flat on the ground the ground would carry the sound".

In My Southern Home, or, The South and Its People (1880), formerly enslaved abolitionist William Wells Brown recorded a secret Voudoo ceremony at midnight in St. Louis, Missouri. Enslaved people circled a cauldron, and a Voudoo queen had a magic wand; snakes, lizards, frogs, and other animal parts were thrown into the cauldron. During the ceremony, spirit possession took place. Brown also recorded other conjure Hoodoo practices among the enslaved population. Enslaved Africans in America held on to their African culture.

Some scholars assert that Christianity had little influence on some enslaved Africans, as they continued to practice traditional spiritual practices. Hoodoo was a form of resistance against slavery whereby enslaved Africans hid their traditions using the Christian religion against enslavers. This branch of Christianity among the enslaved was concealed from enslavers in invisible churches, secret churches where enslaved African Americans combined Hoodoo with Christianity. Enslaved and free Black ministers preached resistance to slavery and the power of God through praise and worship, and that Hoodoo rituals would free enslaved people from bondage. W. E. B. Du Bois studied African American churches in the early twentieth century, and asserts that Voodooism influenced the early years of the Black church during plantation slavery. Southern Black church records from the late nineteenth to early twentieth century indicate that some church members practiced conjure and combined Christian and African spiritual concepts to harm or heal members in their community.

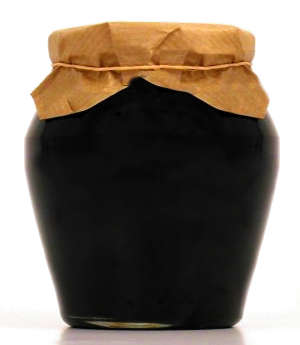
Honey jars or sweetening jars are a tradition in Hoodoo to sweeten a person or a situation in a person's favor. Traditionally, sugar water is used.

Known Hoodoo spells date to the era of slavery in the colonial history of the United States. The New York Slave Revolt of 1712 saw enslaved Africans—Akan people from Ghana—revolting and setting fire to downtown buildings; they were led by Peter the Doctor, a free African conjurer who made a magical powder for the enslaved people to be rubbed on the body and clothes for their protection and empowerment. Historians suggest the powder probably included some cemetery dirt to conjure the ancestors to provide spiritual militaristic support; the Bakongo of Central Aftrica, brought to colonial New York by the slave trade, incorporated cemetery dirt into minkisi conjuring bags to activate it with ancestral spirits. This and other revolts in the United States showed a blending of West and Central African spiritual practices among enslaved and free Black people. Conjure bags, also called mojo bags, were used as a resistance against slavery. In the 1830s, Black sailors from the United States utilized conjure for safe sea travel. A Black sailor received a talisman from an Obi (Obeah) woman in Jamaica. This account shows how Black Americans and Jamaicans shared their conjure culture and had similar practices. Free Blacks in northern states had white and Black clients regarding fortune-telling and conjure services.

Alabama slave narratives documented that formerly enslaved people used graveyard dirt to escape from slavery on the Underground Railroad. Freedom seekers rubbed it on the bottom of their feet or put it in their tracks to prevent slave catchers' dogs from tracking their scent. Former slave Ruby Pickens Tartt from Alabama told of a man who could fool the dogs, saying he "done lef' dere and had dem dogs treein' a nekked tree. Dey calls hit hoodooin' de dogs". An enslaved conjurer could conjure confusion in the dogs, preventing whites from catching freedom seekers. In other narratives, enslaved people made a jack ball to know if an enslaved person would be whipped or not. Enslaved people chewed and spat the juices of roots near their enslavers secretly to calm the emotions of enslavers, which prevented whippings. Enslaved people relied on conjurers to prevent whippings and being sold further South. Mary Middleton, a formerly enslaved Gullah woman from the South Carolina Sea Islands, tells of an incident where a badly beaten enslaved person went to a conjurer, and the conjurer made the enslaver weak by sunset: "As soon as the sun was down, he was down too, he down yet. De witch done dat".

In his autobiography, Bishop Jamison, born enslaved in Georgia in 1848, describes an enslaved Hoodoo man on a Georgia plantation named Uncle Charles Hall, who prescribed herbs and charms for enslaved people to protect themselves from white people. Hall instructed the enslaved people to anoint roots three times daily and chew and spit roots toward their enslavers for protection.

Another slave story talks about Old Julie, an enslaved conjurer known among the enslaved people on the plantation for conjuring death. She conjured so much death on the plantation that her enslaver sold her, sending her by steamboat to a new enslaver in the Deep South. According to post-civil war freedmen, Old Julie used her conjure powers to turn the steamboat back to where it was docked, forcing her enslaver to keep her.

Frederick Douglass, a formerly enslaved abolitionist and author, wrote in his autobiography that he sought spiritual assistance from enslaved conjurer Sandy Jenkins. Jenkins told Douglass to follow him into the woods, and to carry a root they found in his right pocket to prevent whippings from white men. Douglass obeyed and hoped the root would work when he returned to the plantation. The cruel slave-breaker, Covey, told Douglass to work, but as Covey approached him, he had the strength and courage to resist and defeated him after they fought. Covey never bothered Douglass again. Douglass believed the root prevented him from being whipped by Covey.

Conjure for African Americans is a form of resistance against white supremacy. African American conjurers were seen as a threat by white Americans because slaves went to free and enslaved conjurers to receive charms for protection and revenge against their enslavers. Enslaved Black people used Hoodoo to bring about justice on American plantations by poisoning enslavers and conjuring death onto their oppressors.

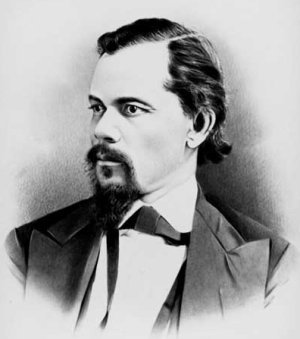
Paschal Beverly Randolph

During the era of slavery, occultist Paschal Beverly Randolph began studying the occult and learned spiritual practices in Africa and Europe. A mixed-race free Black man, he wrote several books on the occult and was an abolitionist who spoke out against slavery in the South. After the American Civil War, Randolph educated freedmen in schools for formerly enslaved people (Freedmen's Bureau Schools) in New Orleans, Louisiana, where he studied Louisiana Voodoo and Hoodoo in African American communities, documenting his findings in his book Seership, The Magnetic Mirror. In 1874, Randolph organized the Brotherhood of Eulis, a spiritual organization in Tennessee. Through his travels, Randolph documented the continued African traditions in Hoodoo practiced by Southern African Americans, such as two men of Kongo origin who used Kongo conjure practices against each other. They had come from a slave ship that docked in Mobile Bay in 1860 or 1861.

=== Post-emancipation ===
The mobility of Black people from the rural South to more urban northern areas is characterized by the items used in Hoodoo. White pharmacists opened their shops in African American communities, beginning to offer items asked for by their customers, as well as things they felt would be useful. Examples of the adoption of occultism and mysticism may be seen in the colored wax candles in glass jars that are often labeled for specific purposes such as "Fast Luck" or "Love Drawing". Some African Americans sold hoodoo products in the Black community, such as Mattie Sampson, a salesperson in an active mail-order business selling hoodoo products to her neighbors in Georgia. Since the opening of Botánicas, Hoodoo practitioners purchase their spiritual supplies of novena candles, incense, herbs, conjure oils, and other items from spiritual shops that service practitioners of Vodou, Santeria, and other African traditional religions.

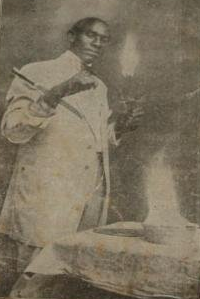
Black Herman

Hoodoo spread throughout the US as African Americans left the delta during the Great Migration. Benjamin Rucker, also known as Black Herman, provided Hoodoo services for African Americans in the North and the South when he traveled as a stage magician. Born in Virginia in 1892, Rucker learned stage magic and conjure from an African American named Prince Herman (Alonzo Moore). After Prince Herman's death, Rucker changed his name to Black Herman in honor of his teacher. He traveled between the North and South and provided conjure services in Black communities, such as card readings and crafting health tonics. However, Jim Crow laws pushed Black Herman to Harlem, New York's Black community, where he operated his own Hoodoo business and provided rootwork services to his clients.

For some African Americans who practiced rootwork, providing conjure services in the Black community for African Americans to obtain love, money, employment, and protection from the police was a way to help Black people during the Jim Crow era. As Black people traveled to northern areas, Hoodoo rituals were modified because there were not a lot of rural country areas to perform rituals in woods or near rivers. Therefore, African Americans improvised their rituals inside their homes or secluded regions of the city. Herbs and roots needed were not gathered in nature but bought in spiritual shops. These spiritual shops near Black neighborhoods sold botanicals and books used in modern Hoodoo.

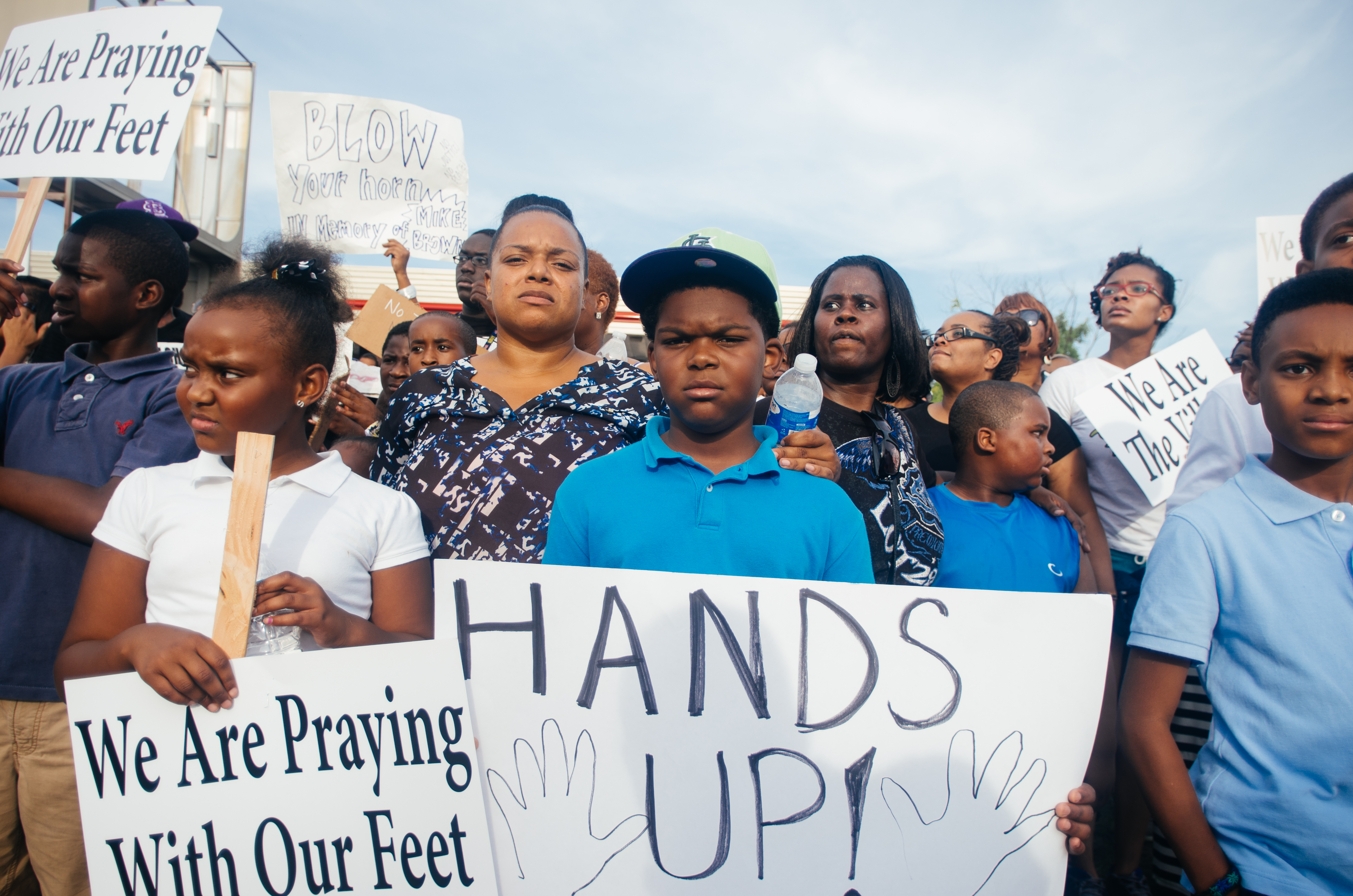
Protesters with signs in Ferguson

After the American Civil War into the present day with the Black Lives Matter movement, Hoodoo practices in the African American community also focus on spiritual protection from police brutality. Today, Hoodoo and other African Traditional Religions are present in the Black Lives Matter movement as one of many methods against police brutality and racism in the Black community. Black American keynote speakers who are practitioners of Hoodoo spoke at an event at The Department of Arts and Humanities at California State University about the importance of Hoodoo and other African spiritual traditions practiced in social justice movements to liberate Black people from oppression. African Americans in various African diaspora religions spiritually heal their communities by establishing healing centers that provide emotional and spiritual healing from police brutality. In addition, altars with white candles and offerings are placed in areas where police murdered an African American, and libation ceremonies and other spiritual practices are performed to heal the soul that died from racial violence. African Americans also use Hoodoo to protect their properties from gentrification in their neighborhoods and on sites that are considered sacred to their communities. On Daufuskie Island, South Carolina in the early twentieth century, a Hoodoo practitioner, Buzzard, placed a curse on a developing company that continued to build properties in Gullah cemeteries where Buzzard's ancestors are buried. According to locals, because of the curse, the company and others following have never been able to build properties in the area, and the owner of the company had a heart attack. Locals from Frenier, Louisiana believe the Hurricane of 1915 that wiped out the town was predicted by a Hoodoo lady named Julia Brown, who sang a song on her front porch that she would take the town with her when she died because the people in the area mistreated her after she helped them.

Hoodoo practices were hidden in African American churches, creating a unique brand of Christianity that fused African traditions that was called Afro-Christianity, or African American Christianity. The Hoodoo religion during slavery included religious practices from various African cultural groups, including the Odinani religion of the Igbo people, the Yoruba and Vodun religions of the Fon and Ewe people, and a Bantu-Kongo tradition in Central Africa. All these African religious traditions blended and fused with Christianity on slave plantations, creating a unique spiritual tradition practice by enslaved African Americans and their descendants. After the Civil War, many of these African religious practices survived in Hoodoo and became a spiritual practice that continues in African American communities today.

== Central African influence ==
The Bakongo influences in Hoodoo practice are evident. According to academic research, about 40 percent of Africans shipped to the United States during the slave trade came from Central Africa's Kongo region. Emory University created an online database that shows the voyages of the transatlantic slave trade. This database shows many slave ships primarily leaving Central Africa. Artifacts and written accounts from across the American South revealed a direct link to cultural and spiritual practices that originated in Angola, the Democratic Republic of the Congo, and the Republic of the Congo. Cultural anthropologist Tony Kail conducted research in African American communities in Memphis, Tennessee, and traced the origins of Hoodoo practices to Central Africa. In Memphis, Kail interviewed Black rootworkers and wrote about African American Hoodoo practices and history in his book "A Secret History of Memphis Hoodoo." For example, Kail recorded at former slave plantations in the American South: "The beliefs and practices of African traditional religions survived the Middle Passage (the Transatlantic slave trade) and were preserved among the many rootworkers and healers throughout the South. Many of them served as healers, counselors, and pharmacists to slaves enduring the hardships of slavery." Sterling Stuckey, a professor of American history who specialized in the study of American slavery and African American slave culture and history in the United States, asserted that African culture in America developed into a uniquely African American spiritual and religious practice that was the foundation for conjure, Black theology, and liberation movements. Stuckey provides examples in the slave narratives, African American quilts, Black churches, and the continued cultural practices of African Americans. In the Lowcountry of South Carolina and the Sea Islands, the Gullah-Geechee people preserved elements of traditional Kongo and Ambundu culture.

=== The Kongo cosmogram ===
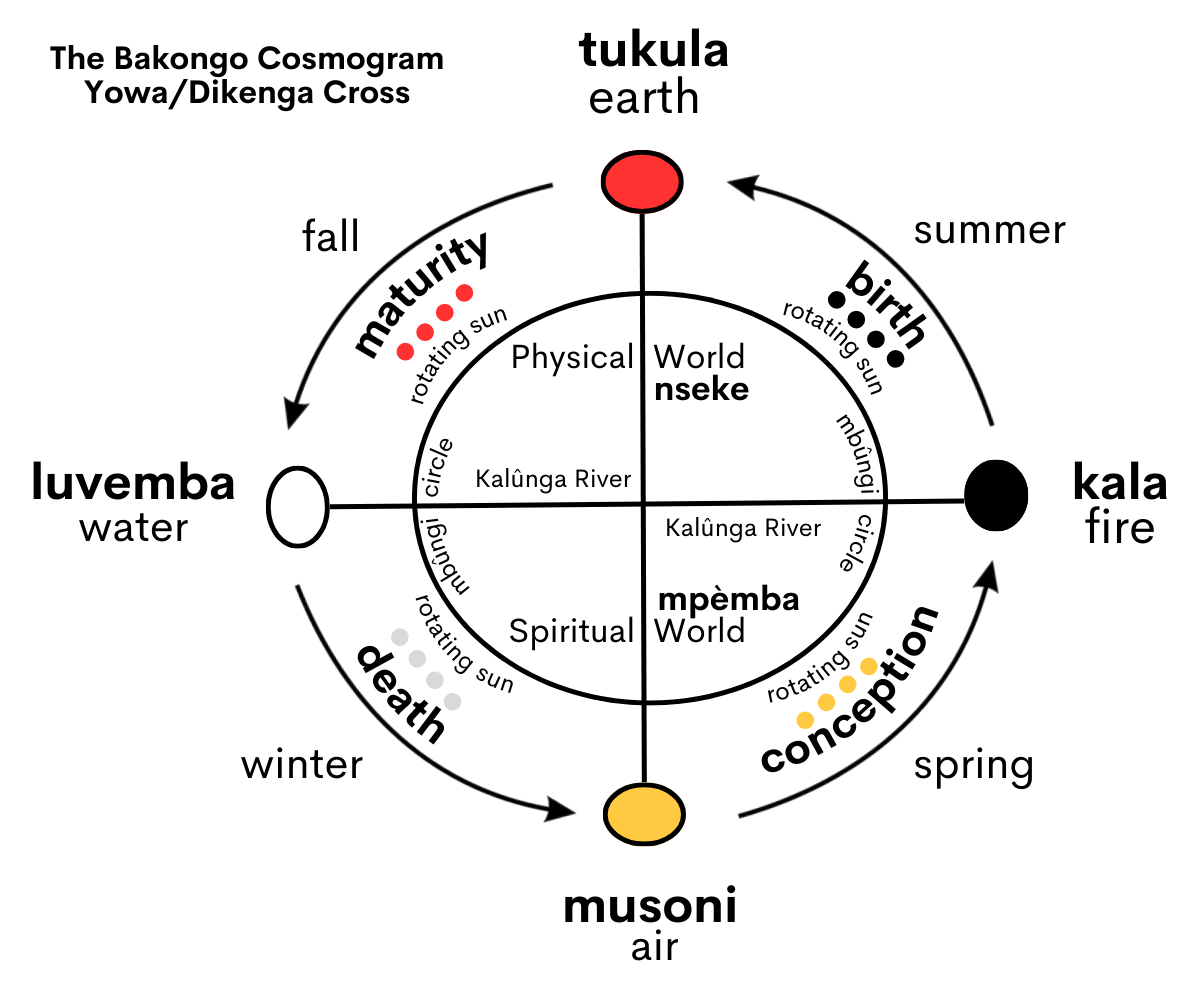
The Kongo cosmogram

Ancient Kongolese spiritual beliefs and practices are present in Hoodoo, such as the Kongo cosmogram. The basic form of the Kongo cosmogram is a simple cross (+) with one line. The Kongo cosmogram symbolizes the rising of the sun in the east and the sun's setting in the west, representing cosmic energies. The horizontal line in the Kongo cosmogram represents the boundary between the physical world (the realm of the living) and the spiritual world (the realm of the ancestors). The vertical line of the cosmogram is the path of spiritual power from God at the top, traveling to the realm of the dead below, where the ancestors reside. The cosmogram, or dikenga, however, is not a unitary symbol like a Christian cross or a national flag. The physical world resides at the top of the cosmogram. The spiritual (ancestral) world resides at the bottom of the cosmogram. At the horizontal line is a watery divide that separates the two worlds from the physical and spiritual, and thus the "element" of water has a role in African American spirituality.

The Kongo cosmogram cross symbol has a physical form in Hoodoo called the crossroads, where Hoodoo rituals are performed to communicate with spirits and to leave ritual remains to remove a curse. The Kongo cosmogram is also spelled the "Bakongo" cosmogram and the "Yowa" cross.

The crossroads is a spiritual supernatural crossroads that symbolizes communication between the worlds of the living and the world of the ancestors, divided at the horizontal line. Counterclockwise sacred circle dances in Hoodoo are performed to communicate with ancestral spirits using the sign of the Yowa cross. Communication with the ancestors is a traditional practice in Hoodoo that was brought to the United States during the slave trade originating among Bantu-Kongo people.

Simbi water spirits, originating from Central African spiritual practices, are revered in Hoodoo. When Africans were enslaved in the United States, they blended African spiritual beliefs with Christian baptismal practices. Enslaved African Americans prayed to Simbi water spirits during their baptismal services.

=== The ring shout ===
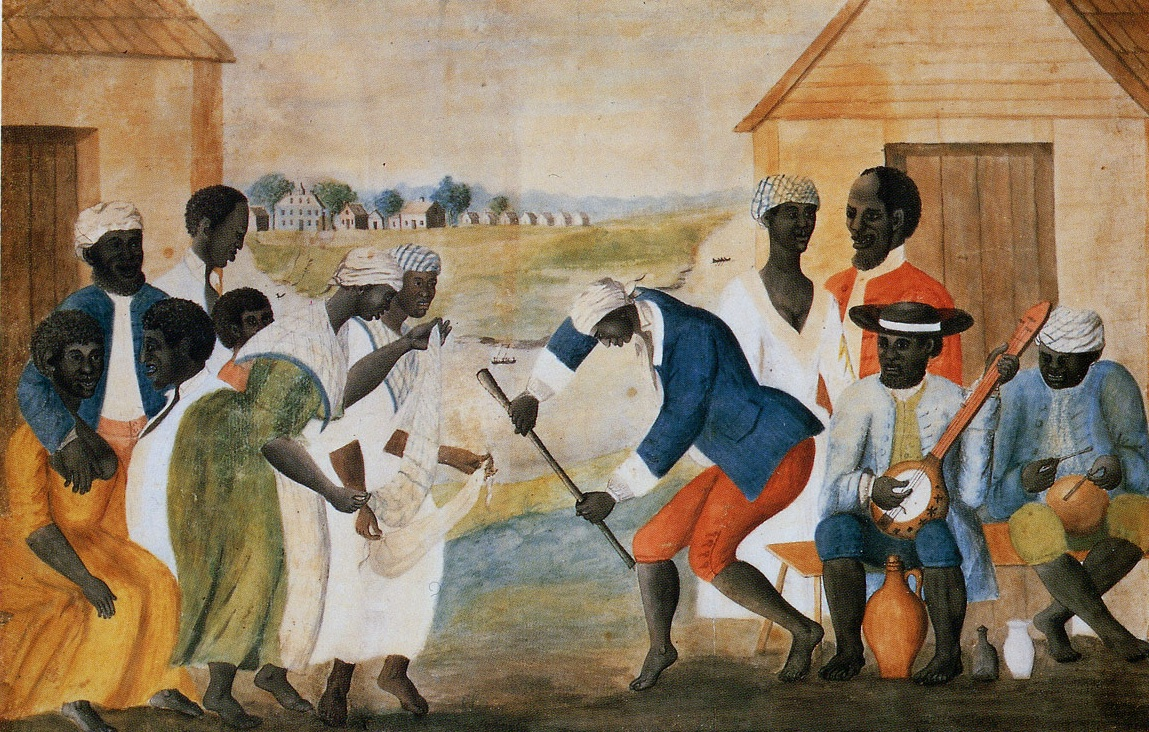
The 18th-century painting The Old Plantation depicts several examples of Africanisms brought to the Carolinas, including musical instruments, headdresses, dance steps, and spiritual traditions.

The Ring shout in Hoodoo has its origins in the Kongo region from the Kongo cosmogram (Yowa Cross). Ring shouters dance in a counterclockwise direction that follows the pattern of the rising of the sun in the east and the setting of the sun in the west. The ring shout follows the cyclical nature of life represented in the Kongo cosmogram of birth, life, death, and rebirth. Through counterclockwise circle dancing, ring shouters build up spiritual energy that results in communication with ancestral spirits and leads to spirit possession by the Holy Spirit or ancestral spirits. Singing, tapping conjure sticks, hand claps and foot stomps provided the musical backdrop and rhythm for ring shouts.

The ring shout in Hoodoo has its origins in the Kongo region of Africa with the Kongo cosmogram. During the ring shout, African Americans shuffle their feet on the floor or ground without lifting their feet, believing that creating static electricity from the earth connects them with its spiritual energy. Shuffling like this with singing and clapping is also done to communicate with ancestral spirits. The spiritual energy intensifies until someone is pulled into the center of the ring, shouted by the spirit. This is done to allow the spirit to enter and govern the ring.

Researchers noticed that the African American ring shouts resembled counterclockwise circle dances in Central Africa. In Central Africa, a counterclockwise circle dance is performed during a funeral to send the soul to the ancestral realm (land of the dead) because energy and souls travel in a circle. This practice continued in the Gullah Geechee Nation, where African Americans performed a ring shout over a person's grave to send their soul to the ancestral realm. In addition, the ring shout is performed for other special occasions not associated with death.

In 2016, Vice News went to St. Helena Island, South Carolina and interviewed African Americans in the Gullah Geechee Nation and recorded some of their spiritual traditions and cultural practices. Their recordings showed African cultural and spiritual practices that have survived in the Gullah Nation of South Carolina. The video showed a ring shout, singing, and other traditions. African Americans in South Carolina are fighting to keep their traditions alive despite gentrification of some of their communities. The ring shout continues today in Georgia with the McIntosh County Shouters. In 2017, the Smithsonian Institution interviewed African Americans and recorded the ring shout tradition practiced by the Gullah Geechee in Georgia. The songs sung during the ring shout and in shouting originated among their ancestors who were transported from Africa into slavery in America, where they replaced African songs and chants with Christian songs and biblical references.

Enslaved African Americans performed the counterclockwise circle dance until someone was pulled into the center of the ring by the spiritual vortex at the center. The spiritual vortex at the center of the ring shout was a sacred spiritual realm where the ancestors and the Holy Spirit resided. The ring shout tradition continues in Georgia with the McIntosh County Shouters. At Cathead Creek in Georgia, archeologists found artifacts made by enslaved African Americans that linked to spiritual practices in West-Central Africa. Enslaved African Americans and their descendants, after the emancipation, housed spirits inside reflective materials and used reflective materials to transport the recently deceased to the spiritual realm. Broken glass on tombs reflects the other world. It is believed that reflective materials are portals to the spirit world.

=== Nganga and conjure canes ===
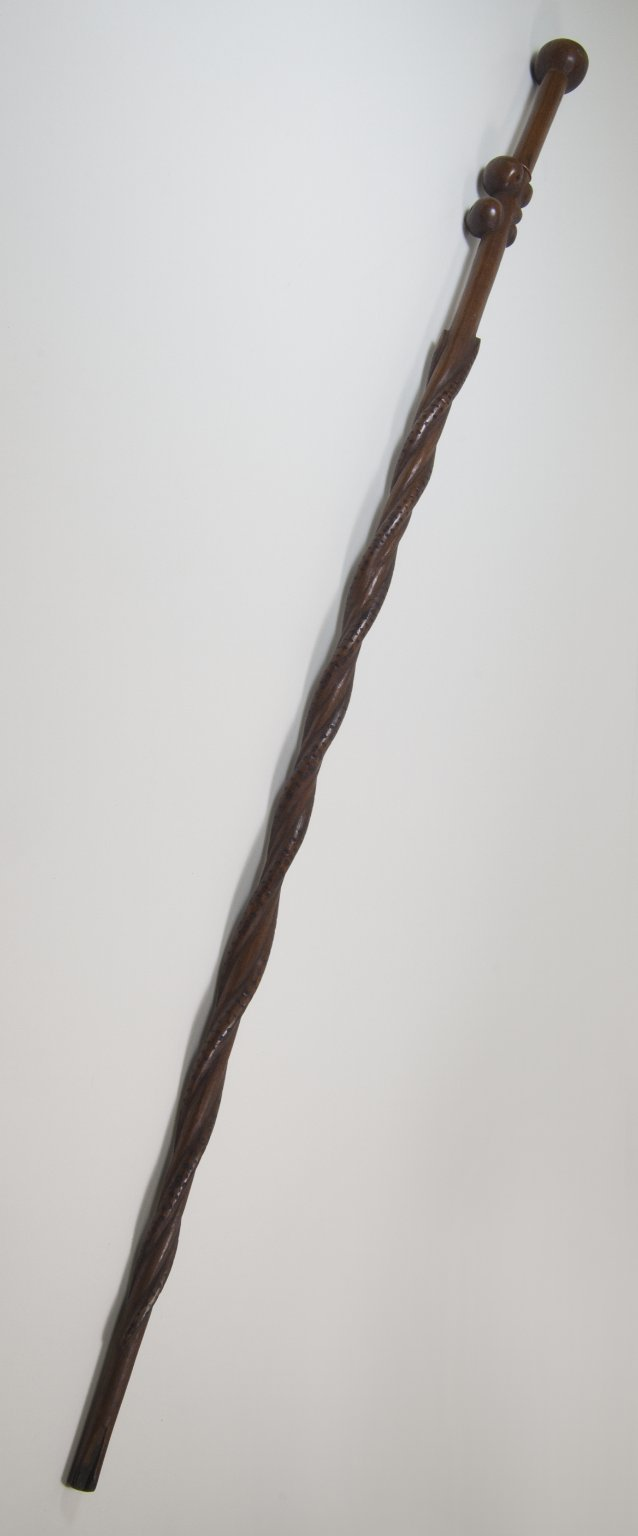
Brooklyn Museum 22.198 Cane / This cane is from the Arts of Africa collection. Bantu-Kongo people in Central Africa and African Americans in the United States crafted similar canes. Historians noted similar meanings and religious uses of canes between African and African Americans, who carved animals and human figures onto canes to conjure illness.

Other Bantu-Kongo practices present in Hoodoo include the use of conjure canes. In the United States, these canes are decorated with specific objects to conjure spirits and achieve specific results. This practice was brought to the United States during the transatlantic slave trade from West-Central Africa. Some African American families still use conjure canes today in ring shouts. The word nganga (pl. banganga) is a title that comes from Kongo spiritual tradition. The nganga is a male spiritual expert who has amassed years of knowledge about Nzambi, the ancestors and the four moments of the sun. In Kongo initiation societies, known as Lemba, Kimpasa, Ndembo, and Nkimba, the nganga imparts his knowledge onto initiates, who later become banganga. The senior male nganga was known as Ngudi Nganga. The women who played significant roles in these initiation rituals, especially in Nkimba, were known as Mama Mbondo and Mama Kongo. When these rituals were translocated to the United States, the knowledge keepers and healers infused their traditions into the emerging Hoodoo tradition. The males titles of Nganga, Lemba, Wasi, Kimba, and Gudi with the female titles Muana (Mwana), Paxi (Kimpasi), Bondo, Binda, Tiama, Gudi, and Mbila, all became used in Gullah-Geechee communities. The nganga healers in Central Africa became the conjure doctors and herbal healers in African American communities in the United States. They carried ritual staffs called conjure canes that they used to conjure spirits and heal people. The Harn Museum of Art at the University of Florida collaborated with other world museums to compare African American conjure canes with ritual staffs from Central Africa and found similarities between them and other aspects of African American culture that originated from Kongo people. The difference with African American canes is the North American animals and historical events, such as sharecropping and lynchings, carved onto them.

Bakongo spiritual protections influenced African American yard decorations. In Central Africa, Kongo people decorated their yards and entrances to doorways with baskets and broken shiny items to protect against evil spirits and thieves. This practice is the origin of the bottle tree in Hoodoo. Throughout the American South, in African American neighborhoods, some houses have bottle trees and baskets placed at entrances to doorways for spiritual protection. Additionally, nkisi culture influenced jar container magic. An African American man in North Carolina buried a jar under the steps with water and string for protection. The man interviewed called it inkabera.

Historians from Southern Illinois University in the Africana Studies Department documented that about 20 title words from the Kikongo language are in the Gullah language. These title words indicate continued African traditions in Hoodoo and conjure. The title words are spiritual in meaning. In Central Africa, spiritual priests and spiritual healers are called Nganga. In the South Carolina Lowcountry among Gullah people, a male conjurer is called Nganga. Some Kikongo words have an "N" or "M" at the beginning of the word. However, when Bantu-Kongo people were enslaved in South Carolina, the letters N and M were dropped from some title names. For example, in Central Africa, the word for spiritual mothers is Mama Mbondo. In the South Carolina Lowcountry and African American communities, the word for a spiritual mother is Mama Bondo. Additionally, during slavery, it was documented that there was a Kikongo-speaking slave community in Charleston, South Carolina.

Robert Farris Thompson was a professor at Yale University who conducted academic research in Africa and the United States and traced Hoodoo's (African American conjure) origins to Central Africa's Bantu-Kongo people in his book Flash of the Spirit: African & Afro-American Art & Philosophy. Thompson was an African Art historian who found through his study of African Art the origins of African Americans' spiritual practices in certain regions in Africa. Albert J. Raboteau traced the origins of Hoodoo (conjure, rootwork) practices in the United States to West and Central Africa. These origins developed a slave culture in the United States that was social, spiritual, and religious. Professor Eddie Glaude at Princeton University defines Hoodoo as part of African American religious life with practices influenced from Africa that fused with Christianity, creating an African American religious culture for liberation.

=== Artifacts ===
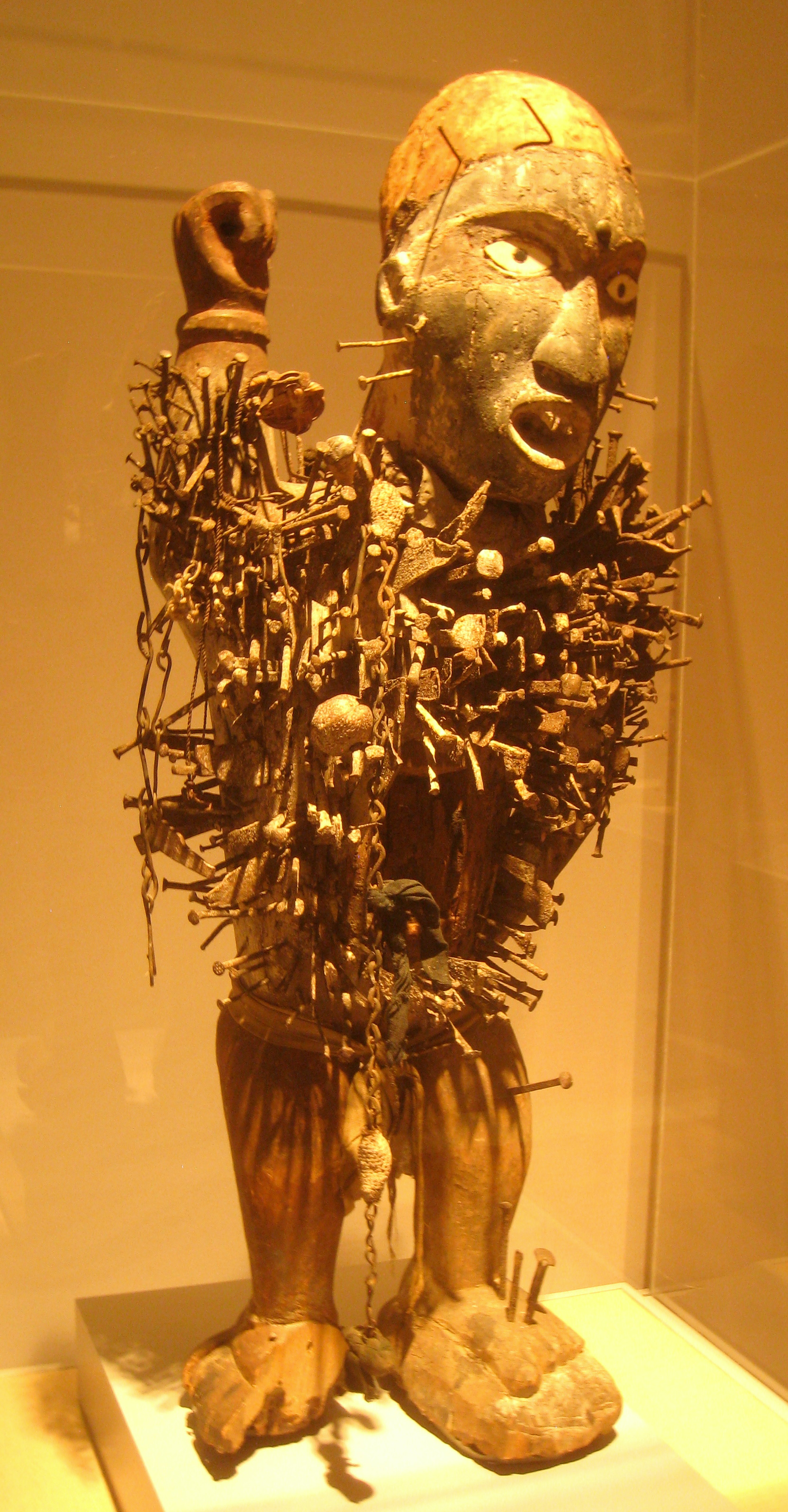
Archeologists found an intact nkisi nkondi inside a slave cabin in Brazoria, Texas.

In an African American church on the Eastern Shore of Virginia, Kongo cosmograms were designed into the church's window frames. The church was built facing an axis of an east–west direction so the sun rises directly over the church steeple in the east. The burial grounds of the church also show continued African American burial practices of placing mirror-like objects on top of graves.

In Savannah, Georgia, in a historic African American church called First African Baptist Church, the Kongo cosmogram symbol was found in the basement of the church. African Americans punctured holes in the basement floor of the church to make a diamond-shaped Kongo cosmogram for prayer and meditation. The church was also a stop on the Underground Railroad. The holes in the floor provided breathable air for escaped enslaved people hiding in the basement of the church. The Kongo cosmogram sun cycle also influenced how African Americans in Georgia prayed. It was recorded that some African Americans in Georgia prayed at the rising and setting of the sun.

In Kings County in Brooklyn, New York, at the Lott Farmstead, Kongo-related artifacts were found on the site. The Kongo-related artifacts included a Kongo cosmogram engraved onto ceramics and nkisi bundles that had cemetery dirt and iron nails left by enslaved African Americans. Researchers suggest that iron nails were used to prevent whippings from enslavers. Also, the Kongo cosmogram engravings were used as a crossroads for spiritual rituals by the enslaved African American population in Kings County. Historians suggest Lott Farmstead was a stop on the Underground Railroad for freedom seekers. The Kongo cosmogram artifacts were used as a form of spiritual protection against slavery and for enslaved people's protection during their escape from slavery on the Underground Railroad.

Archeologists also found the Kongo cosmogram on several plantations in the American South, including Richmond Hill Plantation in Georgia, Frogmore Plantation in South Carolina, a plantation in Texas, and Magnolia Plantation in Louisiana. Historians call the locations where crossroad symbols were possibly found inside slave cabins and African American living quarters 'Crossroads Deposits.' Crossroads deposits were found underneath floorboards and in the northeast sections of cabins to conjure ancestral spirits for protection. Sacrificed animals and other charms were found where enslaved African Americans drew the crossroads symbols, and four holes were drilled into charms to symbolize the Bakongo cosmogram. Other West-Central African traditions found on plantations by historians include using six-pointed stars as spiritual symbols. A six-pointed star is a symbol in West Africa and in African American spirituality.

On another plantation in Maryland, archeologists unearthed artifacts that showed a blend of Central African and Christian spiritual practices among enslaved people. This was Ezekiel's Wheel in the Bible that blended with the Central African Kongo cosmogram. This may explain the connection enslaved Black Americans had with the Christian cross, as it resembled their African symbol. The cosmogram represents the universe and how human souls travel in the spiritual realm after death, entering the ancestral realm and reincarnating back into the family. The artifacts uncovered at the James Brice House included Kongo cosmogram engravings drawn as crossroads (an X) inside the house. This was done to ward a place from a harsh enslaver. Also, the Kongo cosmogram is evident in Hoodoo practice among Black Americans. Archeologists unearthed clay bowls from a former slave plantation in South Carolina made by enslaved Africans, engraving the Kongo cosmogram onto the clay bowls. African Americans used these clay bowls for ritual purposes.

In 1998, in a historic house in Annapolis, Maryland called the Brice House, archaeologists unearthed Hoodoo artifacts inside the house that linked to the Kongo people. These artifacts are the continued practice of the Kongo's minkisi and nkisi culture in the United States brought over by enslaved Africans. For example, archeologists found artifacts used by enslaved African Americans to control spirits by housing spirits inside caches or nkisi bundles. These spirits inside objects were placed in secret locations to protect an area or bring harm to enslavers. "In their physical manifestations, minkisi (nkisi) are sacred objects that embody spiritual beings and generally take the form of a container such as a gourd, pot, bag, or snail shell. Medicines that provide the minkisi with power, such as chalk, nuts, plants, soil, stones, and charcoal, are placed in the container." Nkisi bundles were found on other plantations in Virginia and Maryland. For example, nkisi bundles were found for healing or misfortune. Archeologists found objects believed by the enslaved African American population in Virginia and Maryland to have spiritual power, such as coins, crystals, roots, fingernail clippings, crab claws, beads, iron, bones, and other items assembled inside a bundle to conjure a specific result for either protection or healing. These items were hidden inside enslaved people's dwellings. These practices were concealed from enslavers.

In Darrow, Louisiana, at the Ashland-Belle Helene Plantation, historians and archeologists unearthed Kongo and Central African practices inside slave cabins. Enslaved Africans in Louisiana conjured the spirits of Kongo ancestors and water spirits using seashells. Other charms in several slave cabins included silver coins, beads, polished stones, and bones made into necklaces or carried in pockets for protection. These artifacts provide examples of African rituals at Ashland Plantation. Enslavers tried to stop African practices, but enslaved African Americans disguised their rituals by using American materials, applying African interpretations to them, and hiding the charms in their pockets or making them into necklaces to conceal these practices from their enslavers.

In Talbot County, Maryland, at the Wye House plantation, where Frederick Douglass was enslaved in his youth, Kongo-related artifacts were found. Enslaved African Americans created items to ward off evil spirits by creating a Hoodoo bundle near the entrances to chimneys, believed to be where spirits enter. The Hoodoo bundle contained pieces of iron and a horseshoe. Enslaved African Americans put eyelets on shoes and boots to trap spirits. Archaeologists also found small carved wooden faces. The wooden carvings had two faces carved into them on both sides, interpreted to represent an African American conjurer who was a two-headed doctor. In Hoodoo, a two-headed doctor is a conjurer who can see into the future and has knowledge about spirits and things unknown.

At the Levi Jordan Plantation in Brazoria, Texas, near the Gulf Coast, researchers suggest that plantation owner Levi Jordan may have transported captive Africans from Cuba back to his plantation in Texas. These captive Africans practiced a Bantu-Kongo religion in Cuba, and researchers excavated Kongo-related artifacts at the site. For example, archeologists found the remains of an nkisi nkondi with iron wedges driven into the figure to activate its spirit in one of the cabins called the "curer's cabin." Researchers also found a Kongo bilongo, which enslaved African Americans created using materials from white porcelain to make a doll figure. In the western section of the cabin, they found iron kettles and iron chain fragments, suggesting that the western section of the cabin was an altar to the Kongo spirit Zarabanda.

=== Magical amulets ===
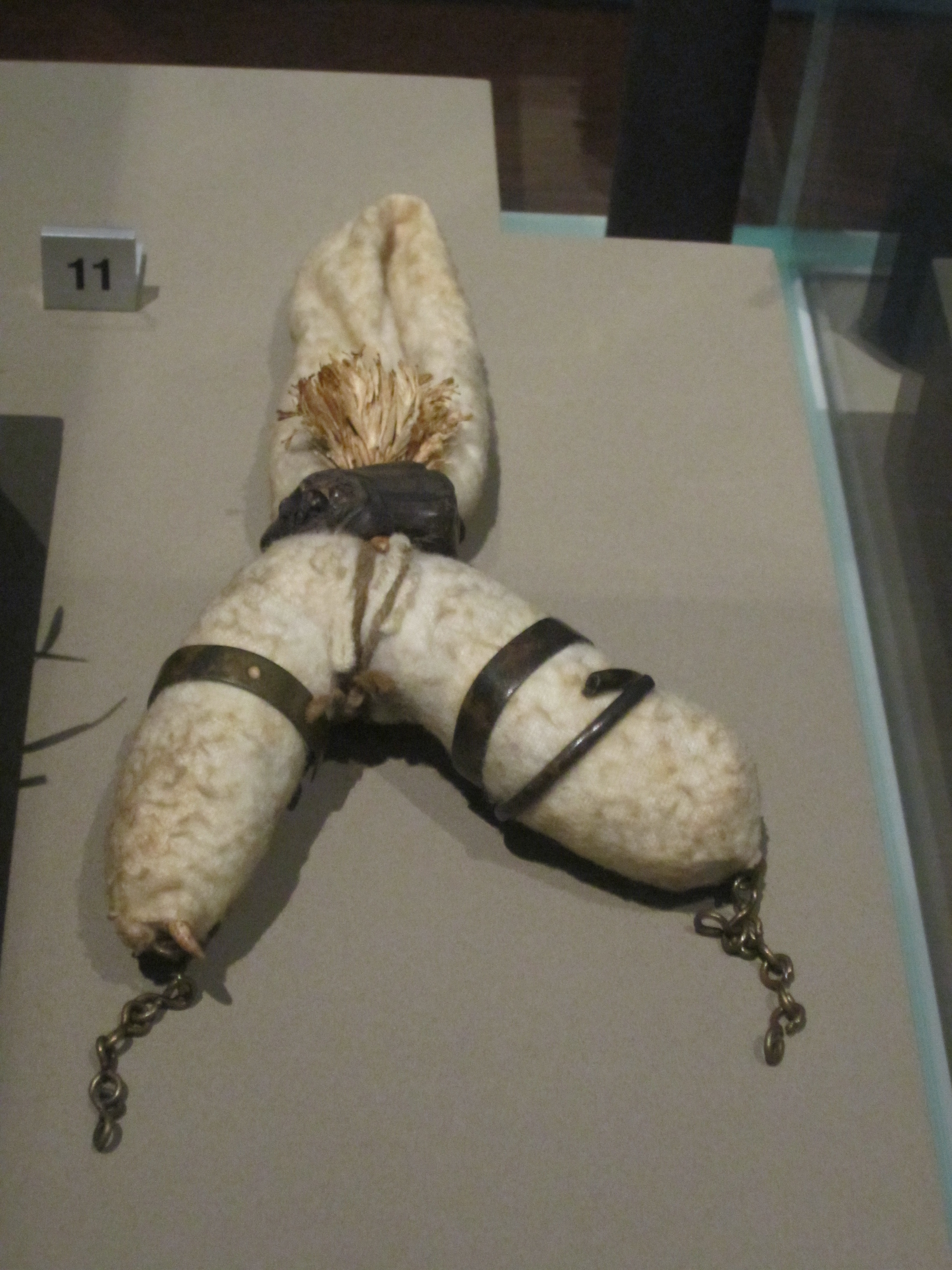
Minkisi (Kongo), World Museum Liverpool - Minkisi cloth bundles were found on slave plantations in the United States in the Deep South.

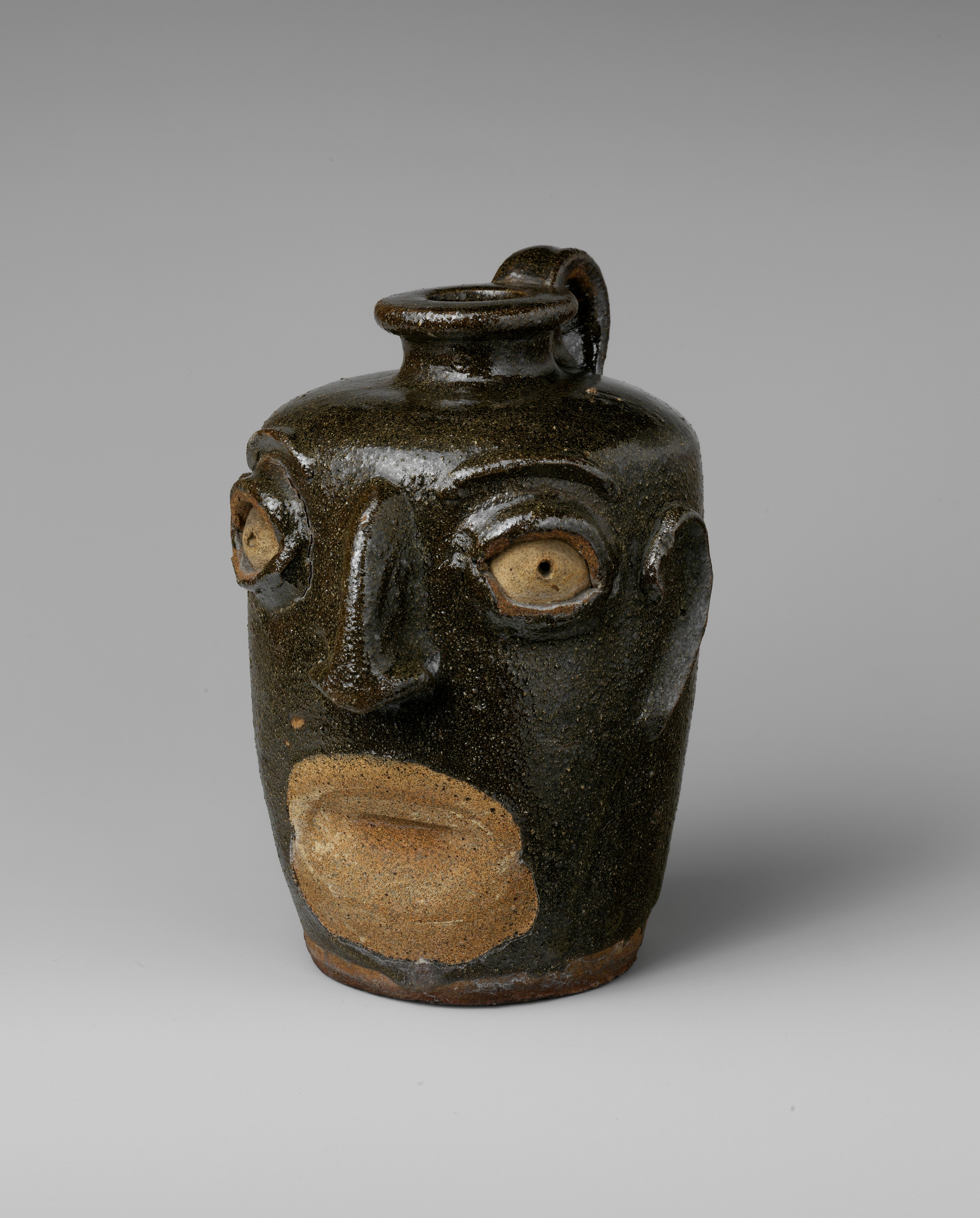
An example of an African American face jug from the Edgefield District of South Carolina. Historians suggest face jugs may have functioned like an nkisi, a spirit container. Locals call face jugs "voodoo pots" and "ugly jugs." African American face jugs are similar in appearance to face jugs made by Bantu people in the Kongo region.

The mojo bag in Hoodoo has Bantu-Kongo origins. Mojo bags are also called toby, which is derived from the Kikongo word tobe. The word mojo also originated from the Kikongo word mooyo, which means that natural ingredients have indwelling spirit that can be utilized in mojo bags to bring luck and protection. The mojo bag or conjure bag derived from the Bantu-Kongo minkisi. The nkisi (singular) and minkisi (plural) are objects created by hand and inhabited by a spirit or spirits. These objects can be bags (mojo bags or conjure bags), gourds, shells, or other containers. Various items are placed inside a bag to give it a particular spirit or job to do. Mojo bags and minkisi are filled with graveyard dirt, herbs, roots, and other materials by the Nganga spiritual healer. The spiritual priests in Central Africa became the rootworkers and Hoodoo doctors in African American communities. In the American South, conjure doctors create mojo bags similar to the Ngangas' minkisi bags, as both are fed offerings with whiskey. The word goofer in goofer dust has Kongo origins and comes from the Kikongo word Kufwa, which means "to die." Another Bantu-Kongo practice in Hoodoo is making a cross mark (Kongo cosmogram) and standing on it to take an oath. This practice is done in Central Africa and the United States in African American communities. When drawn on the ground, the Kongo cosmogram is also used as a powerful protection charm. The solar emblems or circles at the ends and the arrows are not drawn, just the cross marks, which look like an X.

A man named William Webb helped enslaved people on a plantation in Kentucky resist their oppressors using mojo bags. Webb told the enslaved people to gather some roots and put them in bags, then "march around the cabins several times and point the bags toward the master's house every morning." After following Webb's instructions, according to their beliefs, the enslavers would treat them better.

Another enslaved African named Dinkie, known by the enslaved community as Dinkie King of Voudoos and the Goopher King, used goofer dust to resist a cruel overseer on a plantation in St. Louis. Unlike other enslaved people, Dinkie never worked in the same way. He was feared and respected by both Black and white people. Dinkie was known to carry a dried snakeskin, frog, and lizard and sprinkled goofer dust on himself, speaking to the spirit of the snake to wake up its power against the overseer.

Henry Clay Bruce, a Black abolitionist and writer, recorded his experience of enslaved people on a plantation in Virginia who hired a conjurer to prevent enslavers from selling them to plantations in the Deep South. Louis Hughes, an enslaved man who lived on plantations in Tennessee and Mississippi, carried a mojo bag to prevent enslavers from whipping him. The mojo bag Hughes carried was called a "voodoo bag" by the enslaved community in the area. Former enslaved person and abolitionist Henry Bibb wrote in his autobiography, Narrative of the Life and Adventures of Henry Bibb, An American Slave, Written by Himself, that he sought the help of several conjurers during his enslavement. Bibb went to these conjurers (Hoodoo doctors) in hopes that the charms they provided would prevent enslavers from whipping and beating him. The conjurers gave Bibb conjure powders to sprinkle around the bed of the enslaver, put in the enslaver's shoes, and carry a bitter root and other charms for protection.

==== Blue Beads ====
At Locust Grove plantation in Jefferson County, Kentucky, archeologists and historians found amulets made by enslaved African Americans that had the Kongo cosmogram engraved onto coins and beads. Blue beads were found among the artifacts; in African spirituality, blue beads attract protection to the wearer. In slave cabins in Kentucky and on other plantations in the American South, archeologists found blue beads used by enslaved people for spiritual protection. Enslaved African Americans combined Christian practices with traditional African beliefs.

== West African influence ==
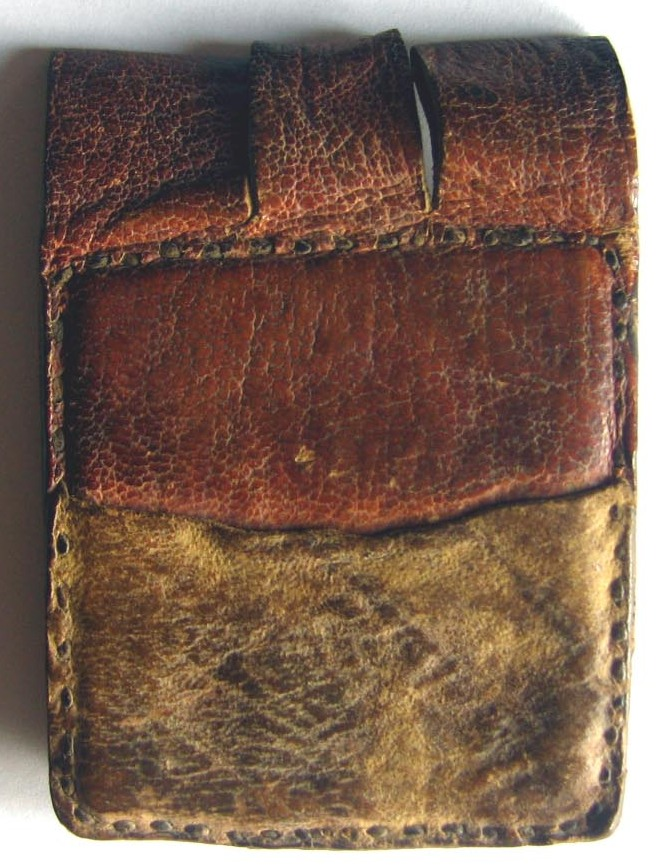
A West African gris-gris bag, the origin of the mojo bag (conjure bag) in Hoodoo

=== Islam ===
A major West African influence in Hoodoo is Islam. As a result of the transatlantic slave trade, some West African who practiced Islam were enslaved in the United States. Before they arrived in the American South, Muslims blended Islamic beliefs with traditional West African spiritual practices. On plantations in the American South, enslaved Muslims kept some of their traditional Islamic culture. They practiced Islamic prayers, wore turbans, and the men wore traditional wide-leg pants. Some enslaved West African Muslims practiced Hoodoo. Islamic prayers were used instead of Christian prayers in the creation of charms. Enslaved Black Muslim conjure doctors' Islamic attire was different from that of other slaves, making them easy to identify and ask for conjure services regarding protection from enslavers. The Mandingo (Mandinka) were the first Muslim ethnic group imported from Sierra Leone in West Africa to the Americas. Mandingo people were known for their powerful conjure bags called gris-gris (later called mojo bags in the United States). The Bambara people, an ethnic group of the Mandinka people, influenced the making of charm bags and amulets. Some words in Hoodoo that pertain to charm bags have origins in the Bambara language. For example, the word zinzin spoken in Louisiana Creole means a power amulet. The Mande word marabout in Louisiana means a spiritual teacher. During the slave trade, some Mandingo people were able to carry their gris-gris bags, or mojo bags, with them when they boarded slave ships heading to the Americas, bringing the practice to the United States. Enslaved people went to enslaved Muslims for conjure services, requesting them to make gris-gris bags for protection against slavery.

=== Vodun ===
Hoodoo also has some Vodun influence. For example, snakeskins are a primary ingredient in goofer dust. Snakes (serpents) are revered in West African spiritual practices because they represent divinity. The West African Vodun water spirit Mami Wata holds a snake in one hand. This reverence for snakes came to the United States during the slave trade, and in Hoodoo, snakeskins are used to prepare conjure powders. Puckett explained that the origin of snake reverence in Hoodoo originates from snake (serpent) honoring in West Africa's Vodun tradition. It was documented by a former slave in Missouri that conjurers took dried snakes and frogs and ground them into powders to "Hoodoo people." A conjurer made a powder from a dried snake and a frog, put it in a jar, and buried it under the steps of the target's house to "Hoodoo the person." When the targeted individual walked over the jar, they had pain in their legs. Snakes in Hoodoo are used for healing, protection, and to curse people.

=== Yoruba influences ===
Archaeologists believe there may be Yoruba influences in Hoodoo. The crossroads spirit in Hoodoo, the Man of the Crossroads, may have its origins in the Yoruba people's crossroads spirit, Eshu-Elegba. In West Africa, the Yoruba people leave offerings for Eshu-Elegba at the crossroads. In Hoodoo, the crossroads has spiritual power, and rituals are performed at the crossroads, where there is a spirit that resides to receive offerings. However, the spirit that resides at the crossroads in Hoodoo is not named Eshu-Elegba. Folklorist Newbell Niles Puckett recorded some crossroads rituals in Hoodoo practiced among African Americans in the South and explained their meaning. Puckett wrote, "Possibly this custom of sacrificing at the crossroads is due to the idea that spirits, like men, travel the highways and would be more likely to hit upon the offering at the crossroads than elsewhere." In addition to leaving offerings and performing rituals at the crossroads, sometimes spiritual work or "spells" are left there to remove unwanted energies. The belief in an entity that lords over the crossroads is present not only in African Diasporic traditions but also in Indigenous traditions around the world. However, Black Hoodoo practitioners in the Chesapeake region have pushed back on the misinterpretation of that finding, knowing the crossroads artifact to invoke what would later be known as The Man at the Crossroads. As entities shifted, reformed, and were reborn, they married with North American land to emerge as new deities.

In Annapolis, Maryland, archaeologists uncovered evidence of West African and Central African practices. A Hoodoo spiritual bundle containing nails, a stone axe, and other items was found embedded four feet below the streets near the capital. The axe inside the Hoodoo bundle showed what archaeologists believe is a cultural link to the Yoruba people's deity Shango. Shango was (and is) a feared Orisha in Yorubaland, associated with lightning and thunder. This fear and respect toward thunder and lightning survived in African American communities. Folklorist Puckett wrote, "and thunder denotes an angry creator." Puckett recorded several beliefs surrounding the fear and respect for thunder and lightning in the African American community. In Hoodoo, objects struck by lightning hold great power. However, Shango and other African deity names were lost during slavery. Therefore, the name Shango does not exist in Hoodoo; it is simply the name "the thunder god." Enslaved and free Black people in New York were known among whites in the area to take an oath to thunder and lightning. During the 1741 slave conspiracy in New York, African American men took an oath to thunder and lightning.

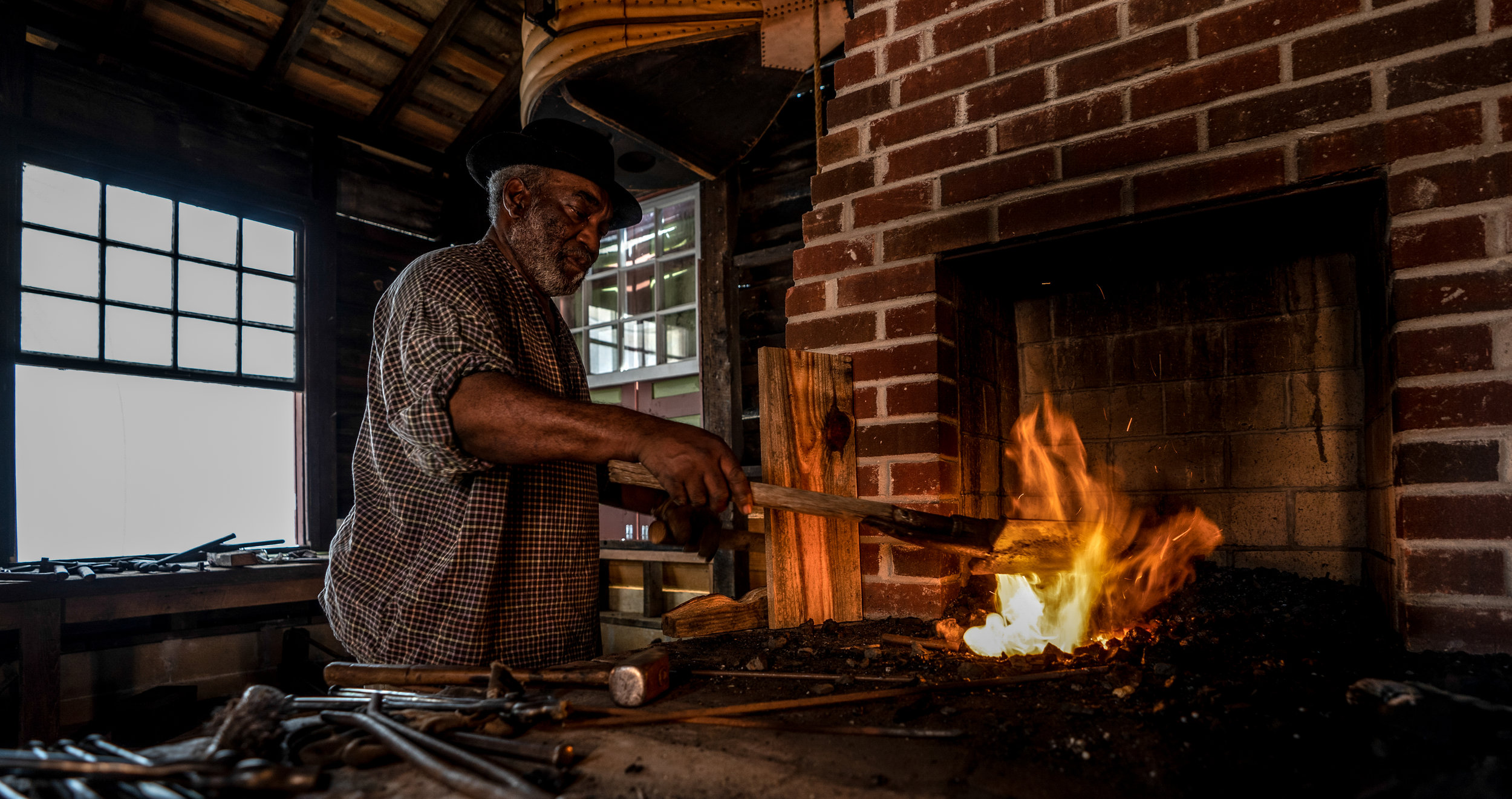
Blacksmiths are respected in Black communities because of their knowledge of the mysteries of metal and its spiritual properties.

Another Yoruba influence in Hoodoo is the use of iron. In West Africa, blacksmiths are respected because they are connected to the spirit of metal (iron). Among the Yoruba, the Orisha spirit Ogun corresponds to iron, and Ogun is called the "god of iron." West African people enslaved in the United States maintained respect for enslaved blacksmiths on the plantation and recognition for iron. Horseshoes, made from metal, are used for protection in Hoodoo. In Maryland, archaeologists unearthed artifacts at the Wye House that linked to the Yoruba people's spiritual belief and practice in the reverence of Ogun. This is why African Americans incorporate horseshoes and metal tools in Hoodoo: because there is a spirit that corresponds to metal that can be invoked for protection from physical and spiritual harm. Yoruba cultural influences survived in Hoodoo, but the names and symbols of Orisha spirits are not present because that information was lost during slavery; therefore, only the natural elements that correspond to each Orisha remain.

In addition, at the Kingsmill Plantation in Williamsburg, Virginia, enslaved blacksmiths created spoons that historians suggest have West African symbols carved onto them that have a spiritual cosmological meaning. In Alexandria, Virginia, historians found in a slave cabin a wrought-iron figure made by an enslaved blacksmith in the eighteenth century, which looked similar to Ogun statues made by blacksmiths in West Africa by the Edo, Fon, Mande, and Yoruba people. West African blacksmiths enslaved in the United States were highly respected and feared by enslaved Black people because they could forge weapons. Gabriel Prosser was an African American enslaved in Richmond, Virginia, and he was a blacksmith. In 1800, Gabriel Prosser planned a slave revolt in Virginia. Historians assert that Prosser became the leader of the planned rebellion because he was a blacksmith. Slave people respected and feared blacksmiths because of their ability to forge weapons and their connection to the spirit of iron. Prosser and other enslaved blacksmiths made weapons for the rebellion, but the revolt never happened because two enslaved people informed the authorities.

=== Magical amulets ===
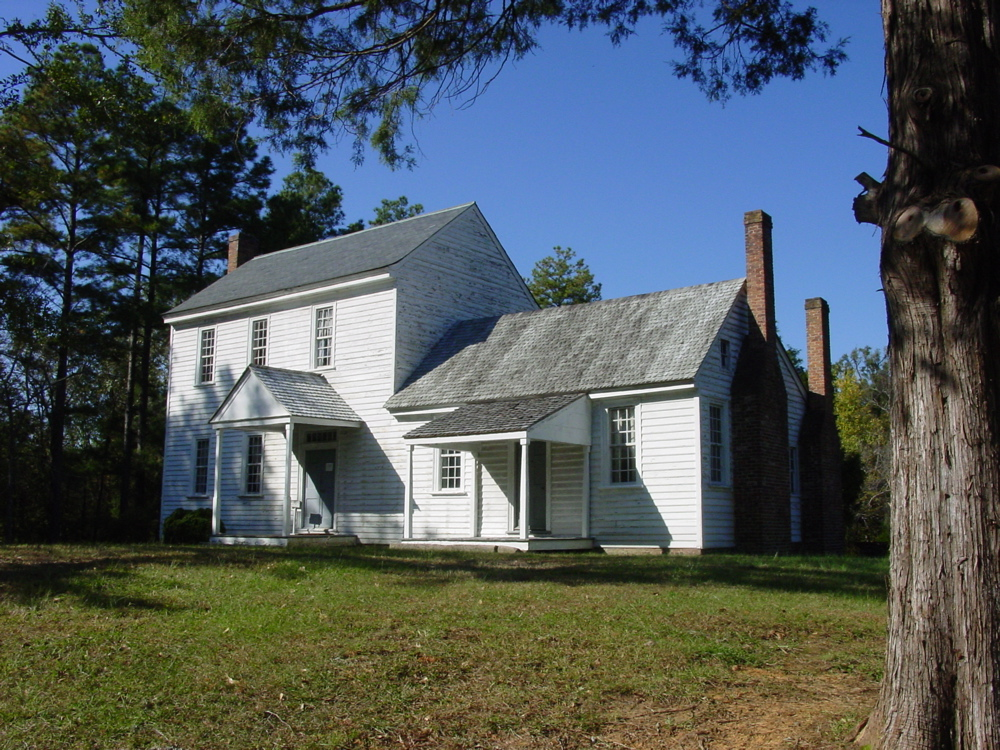
A Hoodoo stick was found between the walls of the Bennehan House to curse (hex) the family.

At Stagville Plantation in Durham County, North Carolina, archaeologists found artifacts made by enslaved African Americans that linked to spiritual practices found in West Africa. The artifacts included a divining stick, a walking stick, and cowrie shells. The wealthy enslaver Bennehan family owned Stagville Plantation; they enslaved 900 African American people. Stagville was one of many large slave plantations in the American South. Inside the Bennehan house, a walking stick was found between the walls to curse the Bennehan family. An enslaved person secretly placed the walking stick to put evil spirits on their enslavers, cursing the family for enslaving them.

==== Conjure sticks ====
The walking stick was carved into an image of a West African snake spirit (deity) called Damballa. In West-Central Africa and African American communities, only initiates trained in the secrets of the serpent and spirits were allowed to have a conjure stick. These sticks conjured illness and healing, and the spirit of a conjure stick can warn the conjurer of impending danger. Cowrie shells were found on the site and were used by enslaved African Americans to connect with the spiritual element of water "to ensure spiritual guidance over bodies of water." In West Africa, cowrie shells were used for money and corresponded to African water spirits.

Other African cultural survivals among the Gullah people include giving their children African names. Linguists have noted identical or similar-sounding names in the Gullah Geechee Nation that can be traced to Sierra Leone, a country in West Africa. Some African Americans in South Carolina and Georgia continue to give their children African names for spiritual and cultural reasons. The spiritual sense is for their ancestors to give their children spiritual power and protection. The cultural reason is so their children will know which region in Africa their ancestry is from.

The practice of carving snakes onto "conjure sticks" to remove curses and evil spirits and bring healing was found in African American communities in the Sea Islands among the Gullah Geechee people. Snake reverence in African American Hoodoo originated from West African societies.

==== Conjure balls ====
Another practice in Hoodoo that has its origins in West Africa is to moisten conjure bags and luck balls with whiskey (rum). It is believed that conjure bags and luck balls have a spirit, and to keep their spirit alive, conjurers feed them whiskey once a week. The practice has its roots in the Guinea Coast of Africa. The practice of foot-track magic in Hoodoo has its origins in the Ghana. A person's foot track is used to send someone away by mixing their foot track with herbs, roots, and insects, specific ingredients used in Hoodoo to send someone away, and grinding into a powder and placing the powder in a container and throwing it into a flowing river that leaves town, and in a few days, the person will leave town. Among the Tshi people in Ghana, spirit possession is not limited to people. Still, objects, inanimate and animate, can become possessed by spirits. Folklorist Puckett documented this same belief among Black people in the South.

== Symbolism in African American quilting ==
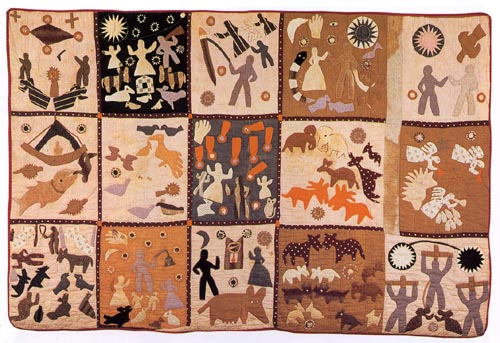
Bible Quilt 1898 / Harriet Powers sewed biblical imagery and African symbols into her quilts.

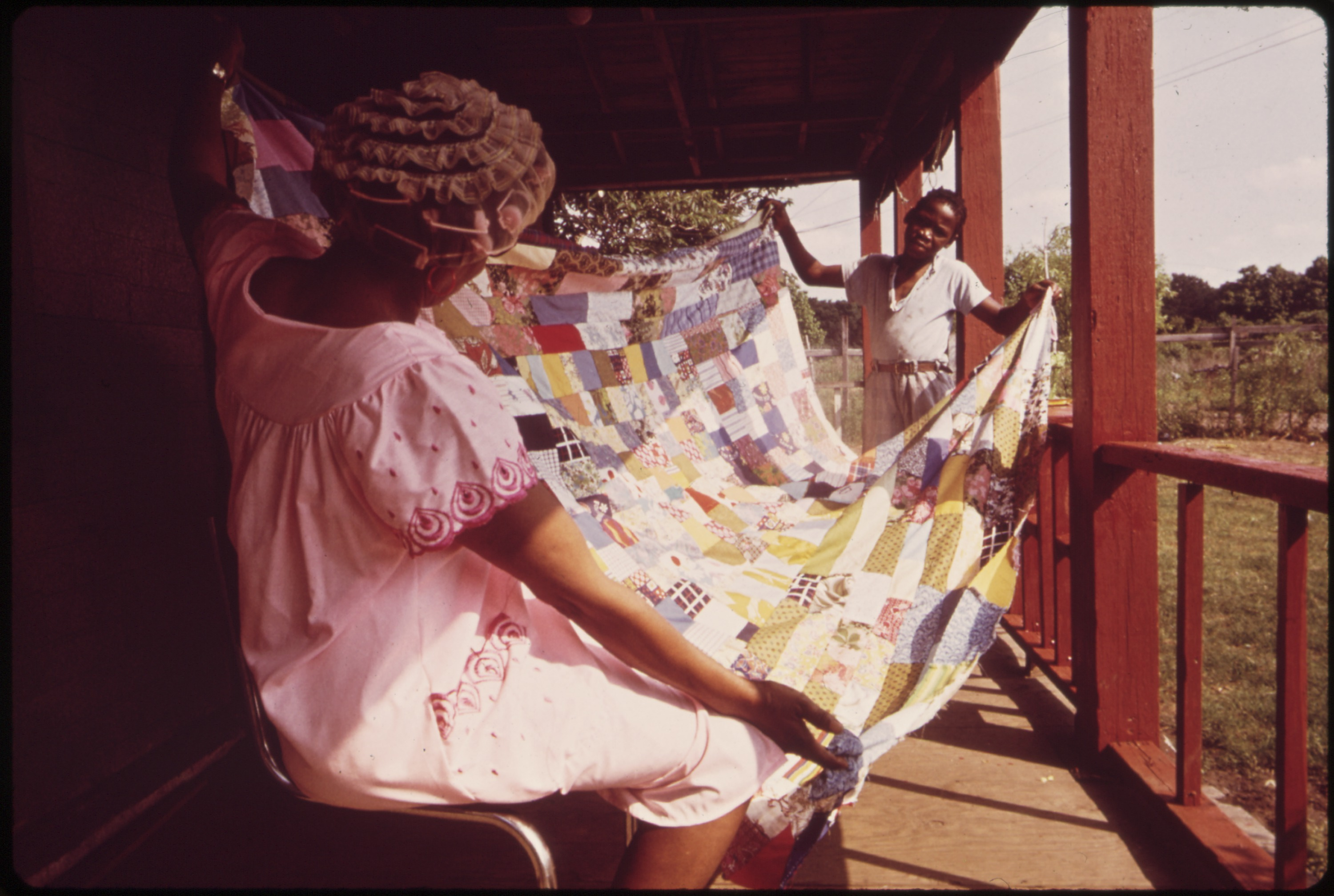
An example of one of Ms. Hunter's quilts on John's Island, South Carolina.

Both Central and West African symbolism has been observed in African American quilt-making. African American women made quilts incorporating the Bakongo cosmogram and West African crosses. For example, an African American woman named Harriet Powers made quilts using Bakongo and West African symbols. On one of Harriet Powers' quilts was a cross with four suns showing Bakongo influence, quilting the Kongo cosmogram onto her quilts. Other African symbols were seen in Powers' quilts. However, scholars suggest Harriet Powers' cross symbol may also be a West African cross, as West Africans also had crosses as symbols. Still, the meaning and use of crosses in West Africa differed from those of the Bakongo people in Central Africa. Fon influence and artistic style was also seen in Powers' quilts. Harriet Powers was born enslaved in Georgia in 1837, and scholars suggest Powers may have been of Bakongo or Dahomean descent.

African American quilts are influenced by American quilt making and West African designs. Adinkra symbols and other African symbols are sewn into fabrics for spiritual purposes. Quilt makers in the African American community also sewed mojo bags and placed roots, bones, and other items inside bags for protection. Another example was Louiza Francis Combs. Louiza Francis Combs was born in Guinea and came to the United States in the 1860s. Her quilts incorporate West African features of "a red striped pattern, patchwork, and two broad asymmetrical panels." This pattern design is similar to the Mande people's religious concepts that evil spirits travel in a straight path, and to protect oneself from evil spirits, broken lines, and fragmented shapes are sewn into fabrics and quilts.

Some of the meanings of the African symbols sewn into quilts were kept secret. Scholars suggest that some African American women who made quilts might have been in a secret society that retained the true spiritual meanings of the symbols in their quilts. Only initiates trained in quilt-making received the spiritual meanings of the African symbols. Some symbols mention the crossroads, the Kongo cosmogram, and the ancestors. Certain colors are used in quilts to protect from evil and invoke ancestral spirits. Scholars interviewed an African American quilt maker in Oregon and have found Yoruba inspirations in her quilts. Her quilts looked similar to the Egungun regalia patterns of the Yoruba people in West Africa, where she incorporated "striped-piecing techniques that pay tribute to her ancestors."

== Rootwork and healing ==
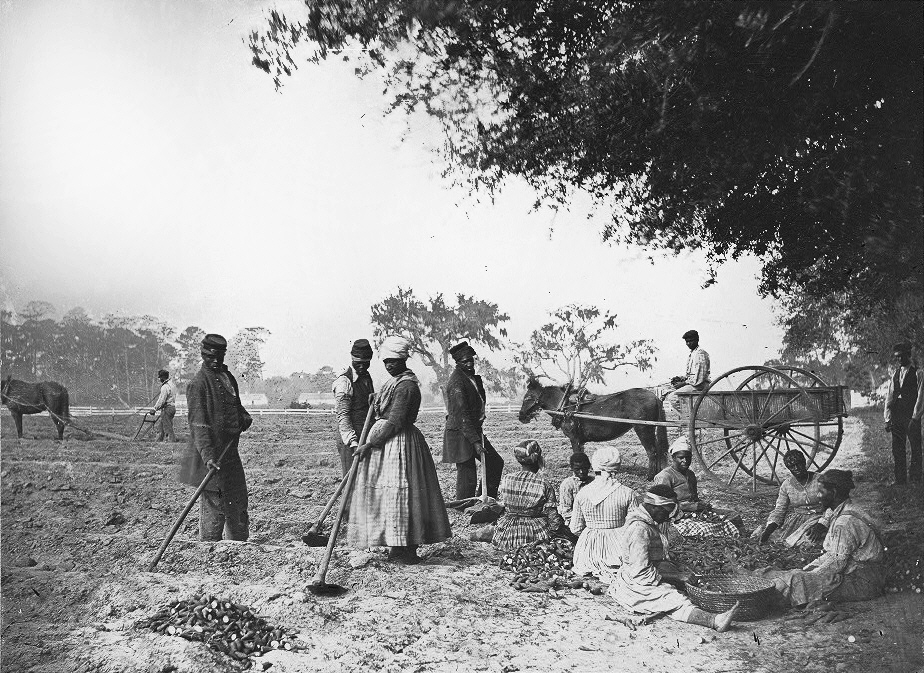
James Hopkinsons plantation slaves planting sweet potatoes

African Americans had herbal knowledge brought from West and Central Africa to the United States. European slave traders selected certain West African ethnic groups for their understanding of rice cultivation to be used on slave plantations in the Sea Islands. The region of Africa these ethnic groups were taken from was called the "Rice Coast," made up of what is now Senegal, Sierra Leone, and Liberia. These areas in Africa were suitable for rice cultivation because of their moist semitropical climate; the European slave traders selected people belonging to ethnic groups from these regions to be enslaved and transported to the Sea Islands.

During the transatlantic slave trade a variety of African plants were brought from Africa to the United States for cultivation, including okra, sorghum, yam, benneseed (sesame), watermelon, black-eyed peas, and kola nuts. "West African slaves brought not only herbal knowledge with them across the Atlantic; they also imported the actual seeds. Some wore necklaces of wild liquorice seeds as a protective amulet. Captains of slaving vessels used native roots to treat fevers that decimated their human cargo. The ships' hellish holds were lined with straw that held the seeds of African grasses and other plants that took root in New World soil."

African plants brought from Africa to North America were cultivated by enslaved African Americans for medicinal and spiritual use for the slave community. They cultivated the plants for white American enslavers for their economic gain. African Americans mixed their knowledge of herbs from Africa with European and regional Native American herbal knowledge. In Hoodoo, African Americans used herbs in different ways. For example, when it came to the medicinal use of herbs, African Americans learned some medicinal knowledge of herbs from Native Americans; however, the spiritual use of herbs and the practice of Hoodoo (conjuring) remained African in origin as enslaved African Americans incorporated African religious rituals in the preparation of North American herbs and roots. Spiritual ritual preparations of herbs and roots were important to enslaved people as they believed combining ceremonies and prayers with medicinal preparations would imbue the medicines with spiritual power and invoke healing spirits that would make the herbal remedies more effective in healing. Enslaved African Americans also used their knowledge of herbs to poison their enslavers.

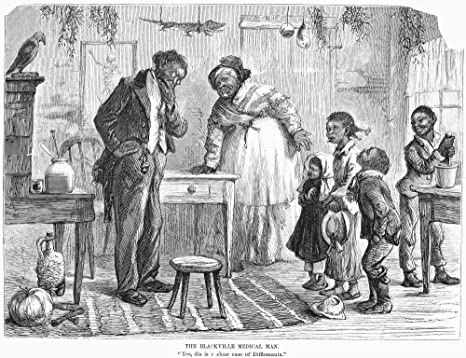
African American root doctors developed a variety of herbal cures in the American South.

During slavery, some enslaved African Americans served as community doctors for Black people and whites, despite many white Americans being cautious of Black doctors because some enslaved Africans poisoned enslavers. Enslaved Africans found herbal cures for animal poisons and diseases that helped both Black and white Americans during slavery. For example, African traditional medicine proved beneficial during a smallpox outbreak in the colony of Boston, Massachusetts. An enslaved African named Onesimus was held in bondage by Cotton Mather, a Puritan minister in the colony. Several smallpox outbreaks had plagued Boston since the 1690s. Onesimus "introduced the practice of inoculation to colonial Boston", which helped reduce the spread of smallpox in the colony. Onesimus told Mather that when he was in Africa, Africans performed vaccinations to reduce the spread of diseases in their societies. An enslaved man was given his freedom when he discovered a cure for a snake bite using herbal medicines. Enslaved Jane Minor was emancipated because of her medical expertise during an 1825 fever epidemic in Virginia and eventually ran her own hospital, using her earnings to free at least 16 slaves.

Enslaved African Americans most often treated medical problems themselves using the herbal knowledge they brought with them from Africa, as well as some herbal knowledge learned from regional Native Americans. Many enslavers lacked the knowledge to treat medical conditions, while some did not care. Laws passed preventing enslaved African Americans from providing medical care for themselves further exacerbated this problem. Enslavers passed preventative medical laws because they feared enslaved people would poison them with herbal knowledge. In 1748, Virginia passed a law to prevent African Americans from administering medicines, because white Americans feared Black folk practitioners would poison them. However, some white Americans in Virginia continued to rely on African American herbal doctors because their cures were better than the white doctors'. In addition, in 1749 in South Carolina the General Assembly passed a law prohibiting enslaved people from practicing medicine or dispensing medication, punishable by death. Enslavers feared a possible slave revolt and being poisoned by enslaved people, so much so that white Americans refused to allow enslaved African Americans medical knowledge. Many of the medicines used by white Americans were chemical, while African Americans used natural herbs and roots and made them into teas.

In a 1911 autobiographical account, Reverend Irving E. Lowery, who was born enslaved in Sumter County, South Carolina in September 1850, recalled an incident where an enslaved woman named Mary on the Frierson plantation was believed to have died from conjure. A rumor circulated that an enslaved woman named Epsey from another plantation poisoned Mary because she was jealous of the attention Mary received from a man on another plantation whom Epsey was romantically interested in. According to Lowery's written account, it was rumored that Epsey received a poison from an enslaved conjurer and secretly administered it to Mary, who died six months later. Lowery wrote that many of the conjure practices of enslaved Black people in Sumter County were influenced by Vodun from West Africa.

Among enslaved people, there was a spiritual belief in refusing to plow a field on a straight path. Some enslaved people believed in the West African Mande concept that evil spirits travel in a straight path, and to protect themselves from evil spirits, enslaved African Americans refused to plow fields in a straight path to break lines for spiritual protection against evil spirits.

Enslaved African American women used their knowledge of herbs to induce miscarriages during pregnancy to prevent enslavers from enslaving their children and to prevent their children from being born into slavery. In the nineteenth century, Black women used herbs such as pennyroyal and senna to induce abortion. Enslaved African Americans only trusted their doctors and not white doctors because enslaved doctors' cures were sometimes considered better than those of white doctors. Enslaved African Americans and freemen learned the local flora and knew what plants to use for treating illnesses. Enslaved herb doctors were the primary doctors on slave plantations, and some of them also practiced conjure.

Before and after the Civil War, African Americans adjusted to their environments and learned the local flora from Indigenous peoples, books, and their study of plants. Europeans also brought their plants from Europe to the United States for herbal cures in America. African Americans incorporated these European herbs into their herbal practice. Agricultural scientist George Washington Carver was called a root doctor (practitioner of Hoodoo who can treat illnesses with plants) by Black people because of his knowledge of using plants to heal the body. Jim Jordan was the son of former slaves born in North Carolina and learned Hoodoo and conjuring from his family. He healed his clients using rootwork, operated a conjure Hoodoo store, and became a multi-millionaire.

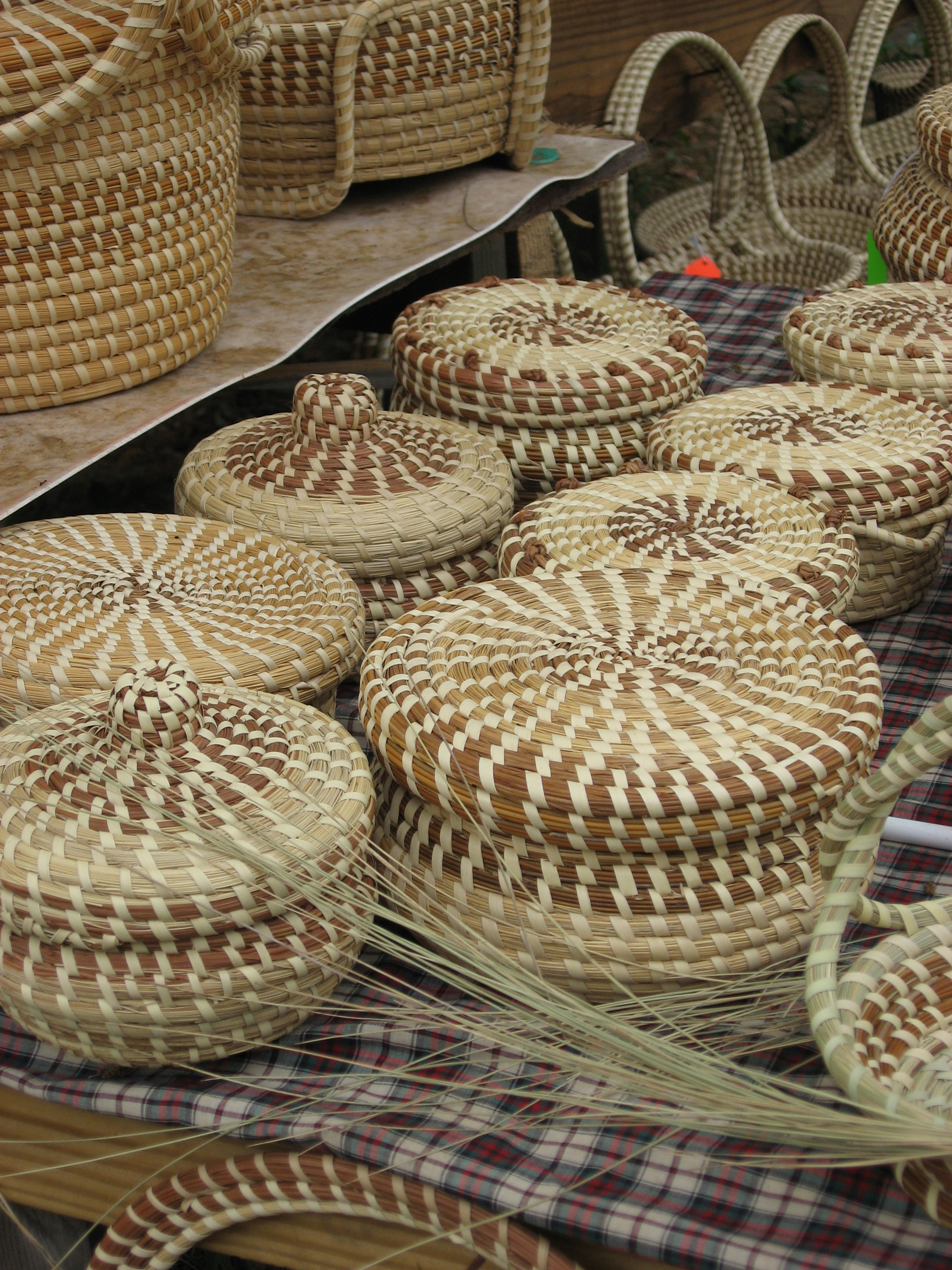
Edisto Island National Scenic Byway - Sweetgrass Baskets - A Gullah Tradition - NARA - 7718281 - Sweetgrass baskets designs and styles are similar to the ones made in West Africa.

Zora Neale Hurston researched African American communities and documented the herbal practices of Black people. African American rootworkers sometimes served as herbal doctors or conjure doctors. African American herbal doctors used their knowledge of herbs to treat diseases such as heart disease, arthritis, cold, flu, and other illnesses. African American conjure doctors performed apotropaic magic and used herbs to remove curses and evil spirits and bring good luck. Sometimes, there were a few African American rootworkers who did both. Hurston documented a traditional Hoodoo herb gatherer called a swamper. This person gathered their herbs and roots from swamps (wetlands). Whether a Hoodoo practitioner is a swamper or not, collecting certain roots and herbs in nature requires a prayer before taking the root or herb, an offering to the spirit of the plants, and a ceremony. If there are snakes that guard herbs and roots, the snakes should not be killed by the Hoodoo practitioner.

It was documented in an Ohio slave narrative that enslaved African Americans combined conjure with herbal healing. Spiritual charms imbued with power through prayer were combined with herbal teas to treat chronic illness. In South Carolina, slaves treated worms using jimsonweed. Rheumatism was treated by massaging eelskin onto affected areas or ingesting a decoction of oak bark or pokeberry tea. Some illnesses were believed to be caused by sorcery (conjure), and the only remedy was to reverse the curse and return it to the person who conjured it or clear it with conjure. Traditional herbal healing remains a continued practice in the Gullah Geechee Nation. Gullah people gather roots from their backyards and gardens and make medicines to heal diseases and treat illnesses. In northeast Missouri, historians and anthropologists interviewed African Americans and found continued West African herbal traditions of using roots and herbs to treat illnesses. The knowledge of how to find herbs in nature and make them into teas and tonics continued in African American communities. The remedy most commonly used in Black communities in northeast Missouri to ward off a cold was carrying a small bag of Ferula assafoetida; the folk word is asfidity, a plant from the fennel family.

In other regions of the South, African Americans made asfidity balls placed around a baby's neck to relieve pain. The inside of the beech tree bark was boiled in water to treat cold and pneumonia. African Americans used bay leaf to attract money by placing a bay leaf next to a dollar bill inside a wallet or a purse, and the person would always attract money. Coffee grounds were used to predict the future. To cause misfortune in a family's home, cayenne pepper was mixed with sulfur and crossing incense and sprinkled around the target's home. To relieve corn and callouses, baking soda, castor oil, and lard were made into a paste and wrapped around the affected area using a cloth. To cure cuts, African Americans placed spider webs and turpentine on wounds. The devil's shoestring placed in the pocket brings good luck and will trip up the devil.

Placing an egg in the hand of a murder victim when they are in their coffin is believed to cause the murderer to surrender to the police in three days. Mustard seeds sprinkled around the bed before going to sleep will protect someone from a boo hag (a person who can astral travel and leave their body at will and attack people in their sleep) from draining their life force. To treat heart ailments, nutmeg was ground into a powder and mixed with water and drunk once a week. To decrease body temperature, jimson weed was tied around the head and ears. To treat measles, mullein leaves were boiled into a tea. To treat the common cold, pine straw was made into a tea. Salt was used to prevent a troublesome person from returning to your home by throwing salt behind the person as they walked out of the house, ensuring they would never return. To cleanse the soul and spirit, salt baths are taken. To prevent evil spirits from entering the home, sulfur was sprinkled around the outside of the house. The bark from a red oak tree was boiled into a tea to reduce a fever or chills. The term smelling meant someone could detect spirits by scent; smelling cinnamon, nutmeg, and ginger meant spirits were present. Liquid tar was added to hot water to ease frequent coughs and colds.

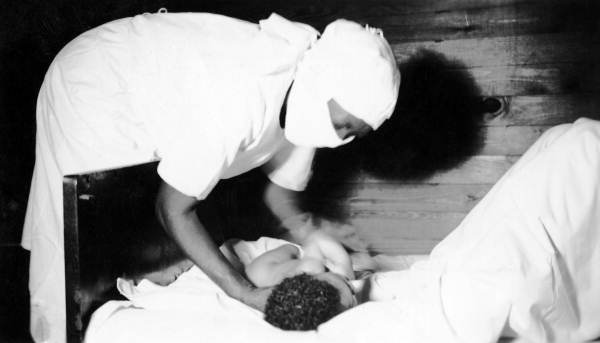
African American midwife with a newborn infant

African American midwives were the primary caregivers for pregnant Black women and nursing mothers during and after slavery. By the mid-twentieth century, licenses were required for all women to become midwives. Before certification, segregation laws prevented Black women from entering hospitals that provided medical care for white people. Also, many African Americans did not trust white medical doctors because some were known to conduct medical experiments on Black people. African American midwives provided medical care for nursing and pregnant Black women in their communities by treating them with herbal medicines.

Many African American midwives practiced Hoodoo. Hoodoo and midwifery practices were combined in African American communities. During childbirth, midwives spiritually protected the house because it was believed that evil spirits might harm a newborn's spirit being born into the world. Protective charms were placed inside and outside the house, and Black midwives prayed for spiritual protection for the mother and newborn baby. After the baby was born, the umbilical cord, called the navel string by midwives, and the afterbirth were burned or buried. Proper handling of the umbilical cord and placenta ensured the mother would have another child. If the midwives did not properly handle these items, it was believed the woman would not have any more children.

== Deities and spirits ==
=== God ===
Since the 19th century, Hoodoo thought has had a Christian influence. African American Christian conjurers believe their powers to heal, hex, trick, and divine come from God. This is particularly evident concerning God's providence and his role in retributive justice. For example, though there are strong ideas of good versus evil, cursing someone to cause their death might not be considered a malignant act. One practitioner explained it as follows:

"Een hoodoo, anyting dat oona da do is de plan ob God ondastan?, God hab sompin fa do wid ebryting oona da do weda ee good ar bad, E got sompin fa do wid um ... jes wa fa oona, oona gwine git um." A translation of this is, "In hoodoo, anything that you do is the plan of God, understand? God has something to do with everything that you do whether it's good or bad, he's got something to do with it... what is for you, will come to you."

Several African spiritual traditions recognized a genderless supreme being who created the world, was neither good nor evil, and did not concern itself with the affairs of humanity. Lesser spirits were invoked to gain aid for humanity's problems.

=== God as a conjurer ===
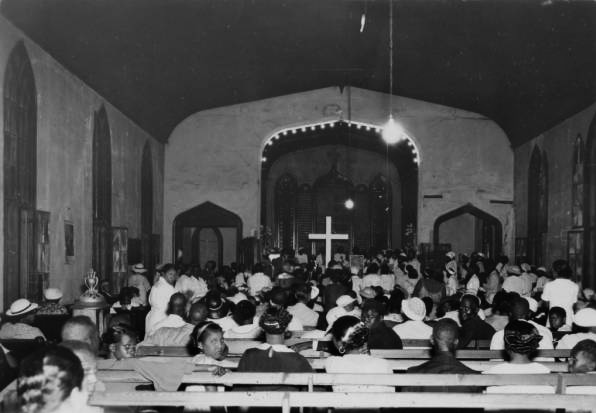
Spiritual Meeting at Father Treadwells Church NOLA. Hoodoo practitioners incorporate Christian imagery on their Hoodoo altars, and some practice Hoodoo in group church settings or are solitary practitioners.

Not only is Yahweh's providence a factor in Hoodoo practice, but Hoodoo thought understands the deity as the archetypal Hoodoo doctor. From this perspective, biblical figures are often recast as Hoodoo doctors, and the Bible becomes a source of spells and is used as a protective talisman. This can be understood as a syncretic adaptation for the religion. By blending the ideas laid out by the Christian Bible, the faith is made more acceptable. This combines the teachings of Christianity that Africans brought to America and the traditional beliefs they brought with them. This practice in Hoodoo of combining African traditional beliefs with the Christian faith is defined as Afro-Christianity. During slavery, free and enslaved Black Hoodoo doctors identified as Christian, and some rootworkers were pastors. By identifying as Christian, African American conjurers were able to hide their Hoodoo practices in the Christian religion. The beginnings of the African American church have its roots in African traditions. When Africans were enslaved in America, they brought their religious worldviews with them that synchronized with Christianity. These African worldviews in Black churches include ancestral spirits that can be petitioned through prayer for assistance in life, spirit possession, laying on of hands to heal, ecstatic forms of worship using drums with singing and clapping, and respecting and living in harmony with nature and the spirits of nature. For example, in Hoodoo, the divine can be commanded to act through the use of mojo bags, prayers, spiritual works or "spells" and laying tricks. One does not have to wait on God but can command the divine to act at will through Hoodoo rituals. This makes African American Christianity in Hoodoo different from other forms of Christianity. By seeing God this way, Hoodoo practices are preserved in and outside the Black church. Also, ghosts and haunts can be controlled in Hoodoo because they emanate from God. Rootworkers control spirits through Hoodoo rituals by capturing spirits using the spiritual tools used in Hoodoo. The difference between Afro-Christianity and European American Christianity is that spirits can be controlled by using the herbal ingredients in nature because herbs and nature have a spirit, and if the spirits of nature and the divine can be influenced, so can other spirits, such as ghosts.

The origins of Afro-Christianity began with Bantu-Kongo people in Central Africa. Before the Bakongo people came to the United States and were enslaved on plantations, the Bakongo (Bantu-Kongo) people were introduced to Christianity by European missionaries, and some converted to the Christian faith. The Bantu-Kongo people's sacred symbol is a cross called the Kongo cosmogram (+) that looks similar to the Christian Cross. A form of Kongo Christianity was created in Central Africa. Bantu-Kongo people combined Kongo spiritual beliefs with the Christian faith, which included the natural spirits and spirits of dead ancestors. The concepts of Kongo Christianity among the Bakongo people was brought to the United States during the transatlantic slave trade and developed into Afro-Christianity among African Americans that is seen in Hoodoo and some Black churches. As a result, African American Hoodoo and Afro-Christianity developed differently and were not influenced by European American Christianity, as some African Americans continued to believe in the African concepts of nature spirits as well as cosmology attributed to Kongo religion and the Kongo cosmogram.

A work published in 2013 on Hoodoo lays out a model of Hoodoo origins and development. Mojo Workin: The Old African American Hoodoo System by Katrina Hazzard-Donald discusses what the author calls:

the ARC or African Religion Complex, which was a collection of eight traits that all the enslaved Africans had in common and were somewhat familiar to all held in the agricultural slave labor camps known as plantation communities. These traits included naturopathic medicine, ancestor reverence, counter-clockwise sacred circle dancing, blood sacrifice, divination, supernatural source of malady, water immersion, and spirit possession. These traits allowed culturally diverse Africans to find common culturo-spiritual ground. According to the author, Hoodoo developed under the influence of that complex, with African divinities moving back into their natural forces, unlike in the Caribbean and Latin America, where the divinities moved into Catholic saints.

=== Moses as a conjurer ===
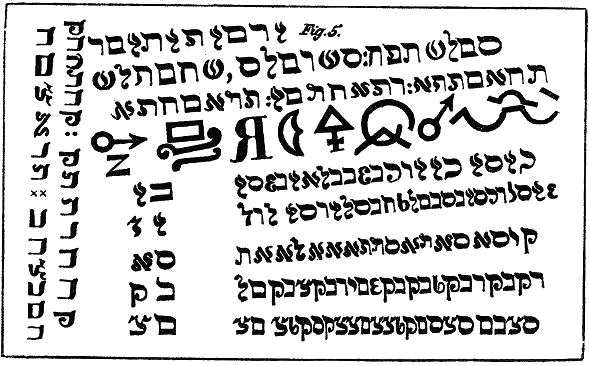
A seal from the Sixth and Seventh Books of Moses

Zora Neale Hurston developed this idea in her novel Moses, Man of the Mountain, in which she calls Moses "the finest Hoodoo man in the world". Obvious parallels between Moses and intentional paranormal influence (such as magic) occur in the biblical accounts of his confrontation with Pharaoh. Moses conjures or performs magic "miracles", such as turning his staff into a snake. However, his greatest feat of conjure was using his powers to help free the Hebrews from slavery. This emphasis on Moses-as-conjurer introduced the pseudonymous work the Sixth and Seventh Books of Moses into the corpus of Hoodoo reference literature.

In the twentieth century, The Sixth and Seventh Books of Moses was cheaply printed and sold in spiritual shops near Black neighborhoods and purchased by African Americans. It was a grimoire that was made popular by European immigrants. Purportedly based on Jewish Kabbalah, it contains numerous signs, seals, and passages in Hebrew related to the prophet Moses' ability to work wonders. Though its authorship is attributed to Moses, the oldest manuscript dates to the mid-19th century. White Americans marketed hoodoo to African Americans for profit, which was not planned to maintain the African traditions in hoodoo. The incorporation of European grimoires ("books of spells") into hoodoo began in the twentieth century during the Great Migration as African Americans left the South to live and work in Northern cities living near European immigrants.

Nevertheless, the Sixth and Seventh Books of Moses has become a part of modern Hoodoo because African Americans connected with the story of Moses freeing the Hebrews from slavery in Egypt and his use of magical powers against the Egyptians. Also, African Americans practiced Hoodoo centuries before the introduction of European grimoires. Hoodoo developed on slave plantations in the United States and enslaved, and free Black Americans used conjure as a form of resistance against slavery.

=== Bible as a talisman and tool for revolution ===
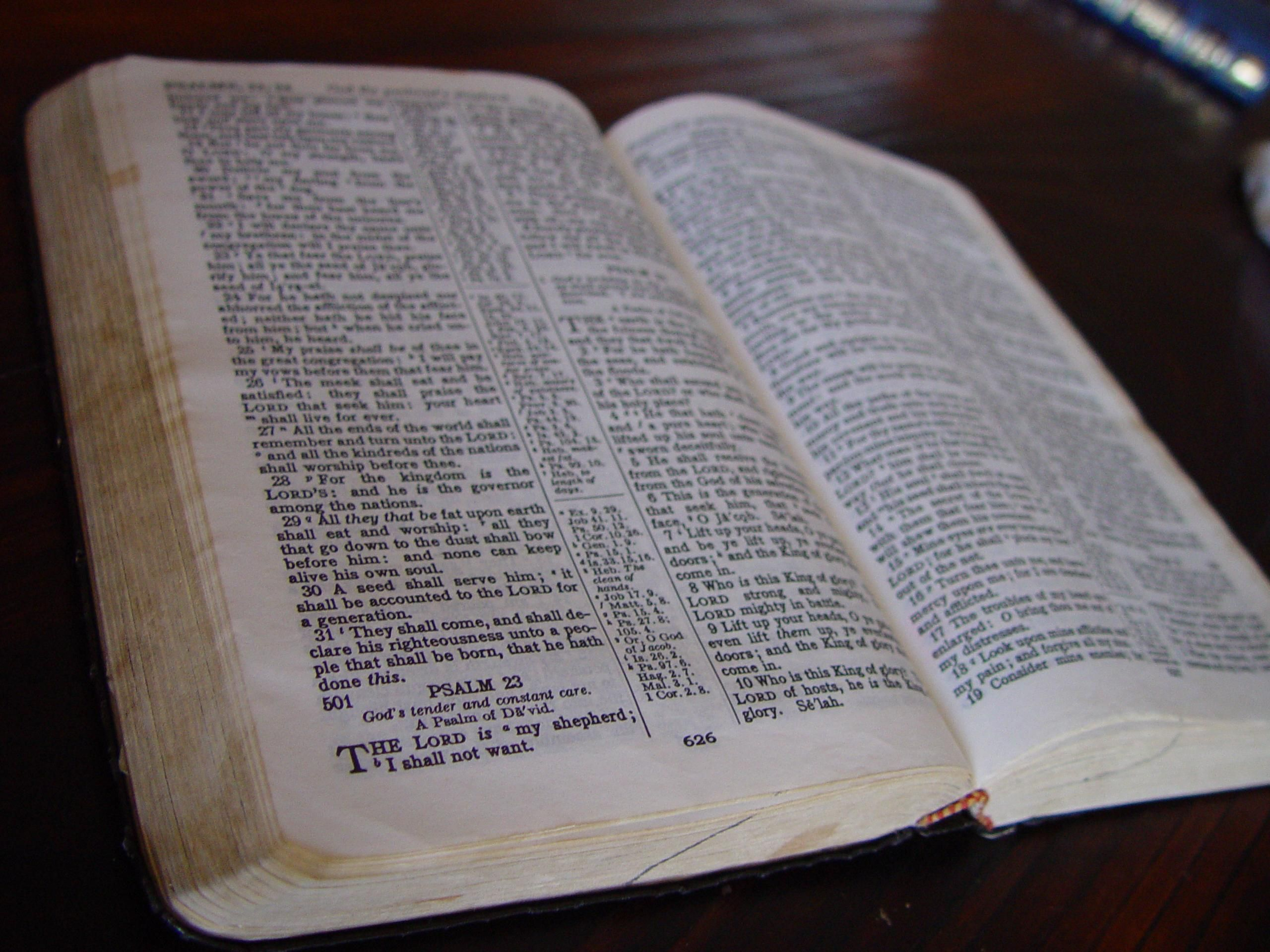
The Christian Holy Bible

In Hoodoo, "All hold that the Bible is the greatest conjure book in the world." It has many functions for the practitioner, not the least of which is a source of spells. This is particularly evident given the importance of the book Secrets of the Psalms in hoodoo culture. This book provides instructions for using Psalms for safe travel, headaches, and marital relations. The Bible, however, is not just a source of spiritual works but a conjuring talisman. It can be taken "to the crossroads", carried for protection, or even left open at specific pages while facing specific directions. This informant provides an example of both uses:

Whenevah ah'm afraid of someone doin' me harm ah read the 37 Psalms an' co'se ah leaves the Bible open with the head of it turned to the east as many as three days.

The Bible was used in slave religion as a magical formula that provided information on how to use herbs in conjure and how to use the Bible to conjure specific results and spirits to bring about change in people's lives, which is a continued practice today. Rootworkers remove curses by reading scriptures from the Bible. At the same time that root workers can remove a curse using the Bible, they can also place curses on people with the Bible.

Jacob Stroyer explained in his autobiographical slave narrative that enslaved people in South Carolina used a Bible to protect from a boo hag by praying "In the name of Father, Son, and Holy Ghost what you want," to the "witch," and after the prayer, placed the Bible in the corner of the slave cabin to protect from a boo hag, believing that by placing a Bible in the corner, the boo hag would not return.

Enslaved and free Black people also used the Bible as a tool against slavery. Free and enslaved people who could read found the stories of the Hebrews in the Bible in Egypt, similar to their situation in the United States as enslaved people. The Hebrews in the Old Testament were freed from slavery in Egypt under the leadership of Moses. Examples of enslaved and free Black people using the Bible as a tool for liberation were Denmark Vesey's slave revolt in South Carolina in 1822 and Nat Turner's Rebellion in Virginia in 1831. Vesey and Turner were ministers and utilized the Christian faith to galvanize enslaved people to resist slavery through armed resistance. In Denmark Vesey's slave revolt, Vesey's co-conspirator was an enslaved Gullah conjurer named Gullah Jack who gave the enslaved people rootwork instructions for their spiritual protection for a possible slave revolt.

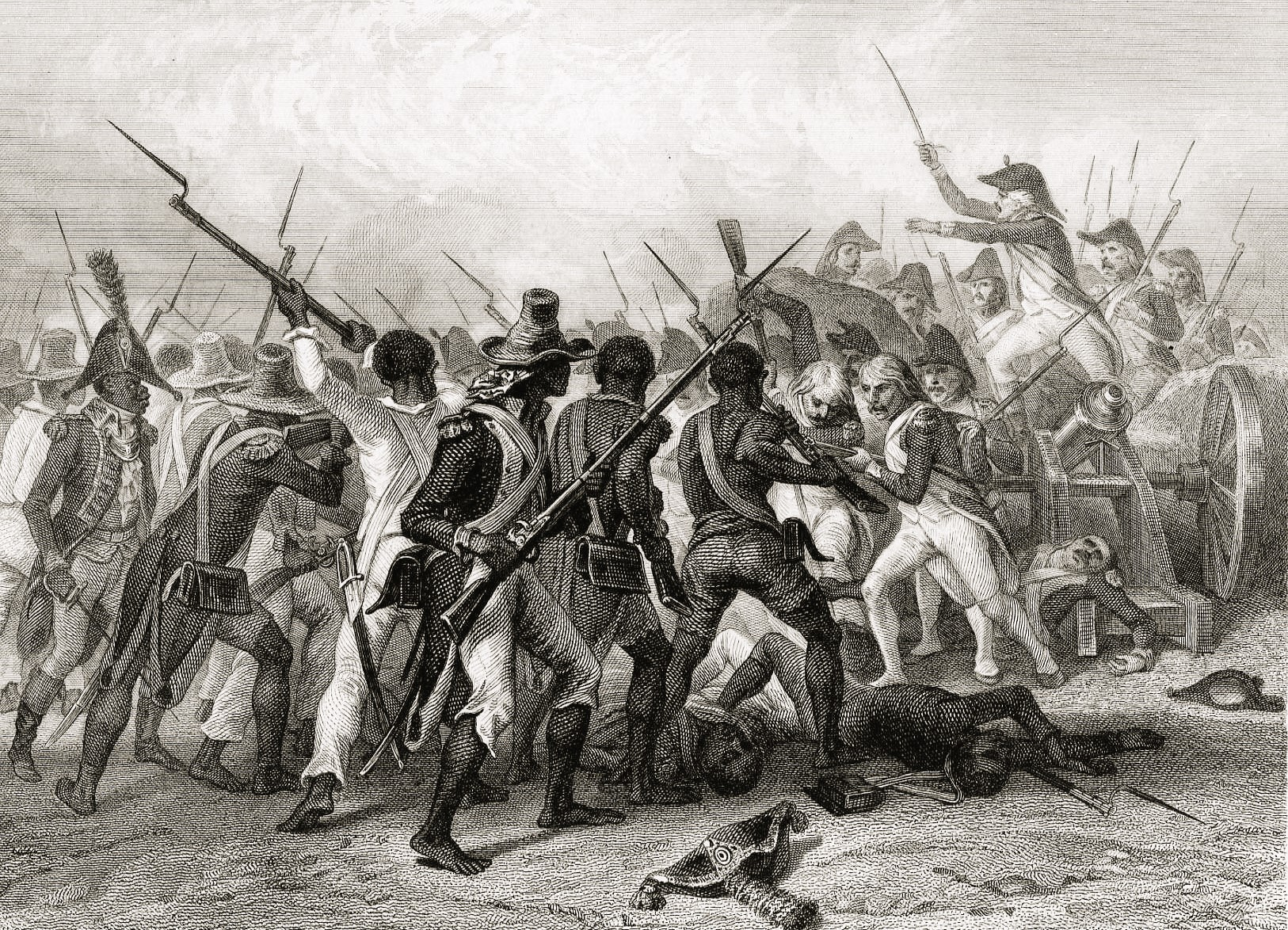
Enslaved and free conjurers were leaders of slave revolts in the African diaspora.

Gullah Jack, who was born in Angola, maintained his Central African spiritual practices. Gullah Jack was known to carry a mojo bag with him at all times for his spiritual protection. For the enslaved people's spiritual protection, Gullah Jack gave them rootwork instructions for a possible slave revolt planned by his co-conspirator Denmark Vesey. Gullah Jack instructed the enslaved to eat a peanut butter-like mash, eat parched cornmeal, and carry crab claws for their protection. The plan was to free those enslaved through armed resistance and conjure. Denmark Vesey and Gullah Jack were unsuccessful because their plan was revealed and stopped. From other historical research and records, Gullah Jack performed a ceremony and made the enslaved eat a half-cooked fowl. One enslaved person said he could not talk about the conspiracy as Jack bound his speech with conjure. According to records, Jack "charmed" enslaved men to join the revolt. Gullah Jack used the spiritual knowledge he had from Angola and made protective charms for other slaves for their spiritual protection.

However, Nat Turner was known among the enslaved people to have dreams and visions that came true. In the Hoodoo tradition, dreams and visions come from spirits, such as the ancestors or the Holy Spirit in the Christian faith. Relying on dreams and visions for inspiration and knowledge is an African practice blended with the Christian faith among enslaved and free African Americans. After Nat Turner's Rebellion, laws were passed in Virginia to end the education of free and enslaved Black people and only allow white ministers to be present at all church services for enslaved people. White ministers preached obedience to slavery, while enslaved and free Black ministers preached resistance to slavery using the stories of the Hebrews and Moses in the Old Testament of the Bible. There was a blend of African spiritual practices in both slave revolts of Vesey and Turner.

Nat Turner's mother came on a slave ship from Africa. Research has not determined what part of Africa she was from. She had a profound spiritual influence on his life. She taught him about African spirituality, a fact evident in his life as he used visions and celestial interpretation of planetary bodies to understand messages from spirit. Turner believed the eclipse of the sun was a message from God to start a slave rebellion. Academic research from Virginia records on the Nat Turner slave revolt suggests that an occult religious ritual was performed to anoint Turner's raid.

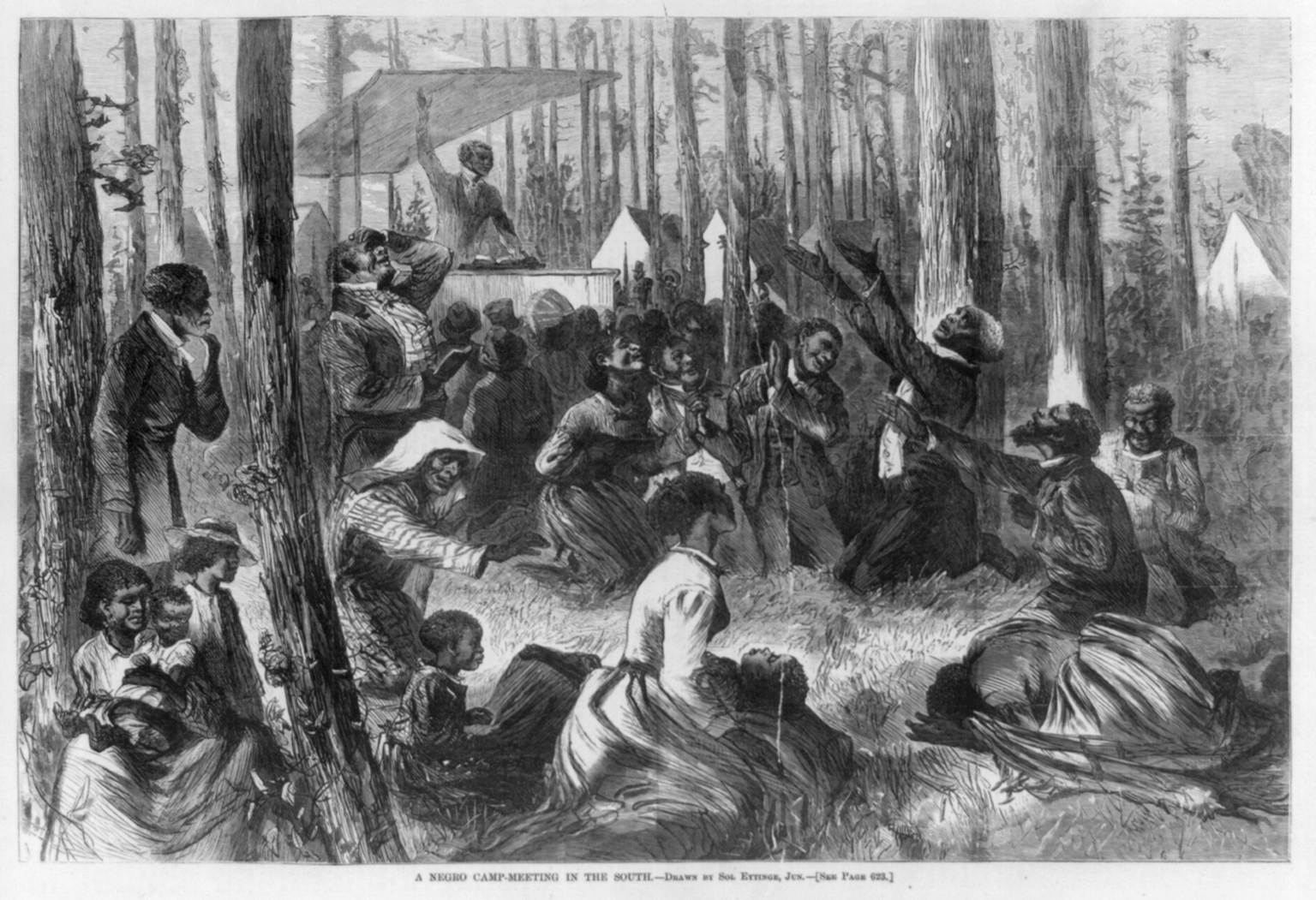
Enslaved and free people held secret Hoodoo and church meetings in hush harbors.

These practices among the enslaved population created a Hoodoo Christian Church or "Hoodoonized" version of Christianity on slave plantations, where enslaved Africans covertly went into the woods at night to practice their religion, a blend of African spirituality with Christianity. Hoodoo countered European American Christianity as enslaved African Americans reinterpreted Christianity to fit their situation in America as enslaved people. For example, God was seen as powerful, and his power could help free slaves. This created an "invisible institution" on slave plantations as enslaved Africans practiced the ring shout, spirit possession, and healing rituals to receive messages from the spirit about freedom. These practices were done in secret, away from enslavers. This was done in the Hoodoo church among the enslaved. Nat Turner had visions and omens, which he interpreted as coming from the spirit, and that spirit told him to start a rebellion to free enslaved people through armed resistance. Turner combined African spirituality with Christianity.

=== Conjuring the spirit of High John ===
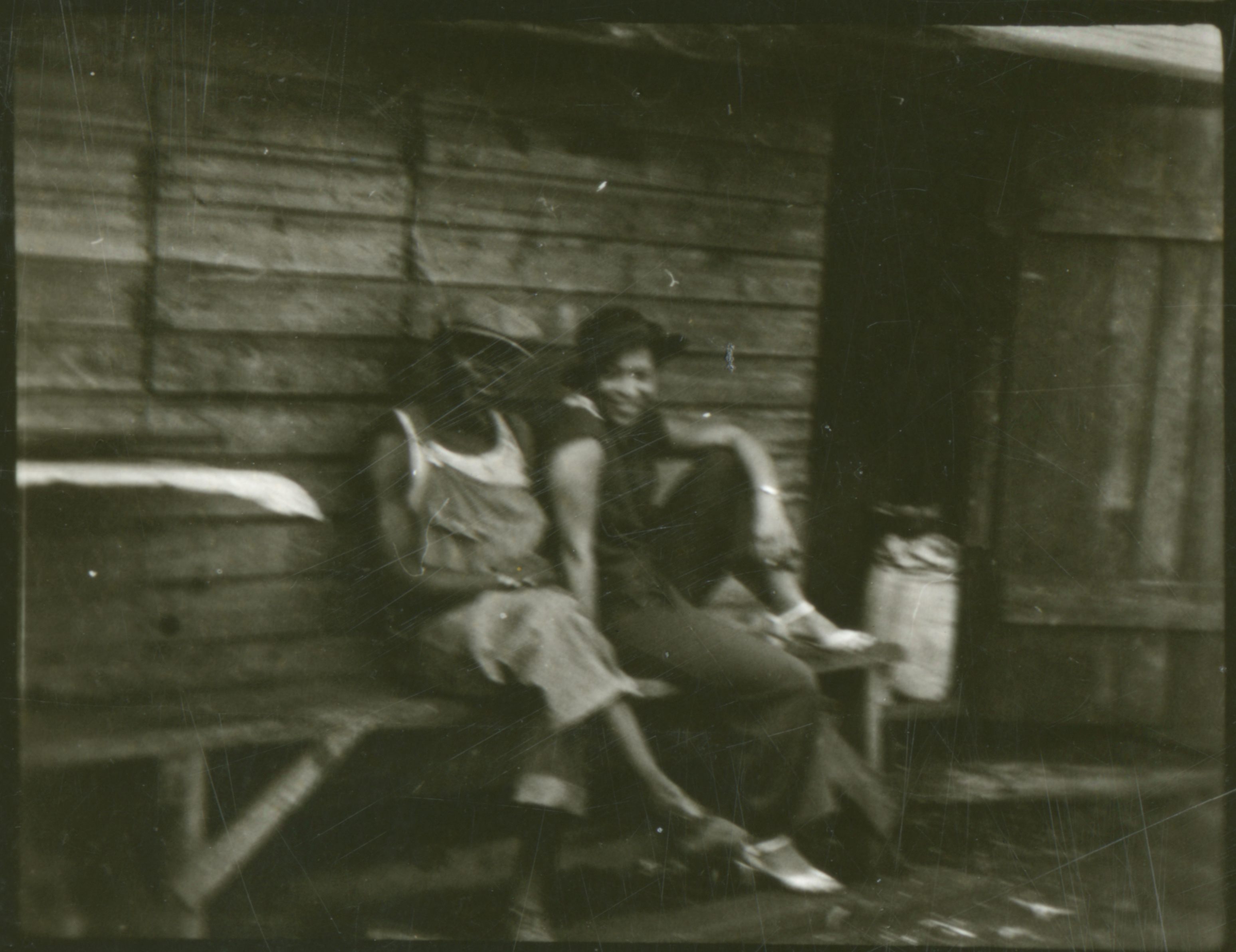
Zora Neale Hurston documented stories about High John the Conqueror from African Americans in the Southern United States.

Mojo Workin': The Old African American Hoodoo System also discusses the "High John the Conqueror root" and myth as well as the "nature sack." In African American folk stories, High John the Conqueror was an African prince who was kidnapped from Africa and enslaved in the United States. He was a trickster and used his wit and charm to deceive and outsmart his enslavers. After the American Civil War, before High John the Conqueror returned to Africa, he told the newly freed slaves that if they ever needed his spirit for freedom, it would reside in a root they could use. According to some scholars, the origin of High John the Conqueror may have originated from African male deities such as Elegua, who is a trickster spirit in West Africa. By the twentieth century, white drugstore owners began selling High John the Conqueror products with the image of a white King on their labels, commercializing hoodoo. Zora Neale Hurston documented some history about High John the Conqueror from her discussions with African Americans in the South in her book, The Sanctified Church. Some African Americans believed High John the Conqueror freed the enslaved people and that President Abraham Lincoln and the Civil War did not bring freedom for Black people. According to one woman interviewed by Hurston, Aunt Shady Anne Sutton, "These young Negroes reads they books and talk about the war freeing the Negroes, by Aye Lord! A heap sees, but a few knows. 'Course, the war was a lot of help, but how come the war took place? They think they knows, but they don't. John de Conqueror put it into the white folks to give us our freedom." Anne Sutton said High John de Conqueror taught Black people about freedom and to prepare for their freedom in an upcoming war. The High John the Conqueror root was used to prevent whippings from enslavers and to win freedom from chattel slavery. The root was given to Frederick Douglass to prevent him from being whipped and beaten by a slave-breaker. Formerly enslaved person Henry Bibb used the High John root to protect himself by chewing and spitting the root towards his enslaver.

=== The Ancestors ===
Parents who died suddenly or by accidental death are believed to return in spirit and visit their children. The spirit of a dead parent might haunt their children, causing spiritual harm to them. To prevent this, small children and babies of the deceased parent are passed over the coffin of the deceased. Former slave Reverend Irving E. Lowrey recorded this practice in his slave narrative when he attended the funeral of Mary, an enslaved woman who died of poisoning. Her infant child was passed over her coffin so that her spirit would not return to visit the baby, scaring it. Lowrey wrote in his narrative: "Mary's baby was taken to the graveyard by its grandmother, and before the corpse was deposited in the earth, the baby was passed from one person to another across the coffin. The slaves believed that if this were not done, it would be impossible to raise the infant. The mother's spirit would return for her baby and take it to herself. This belief is held by many of the descendants of these slaves, who practice the same thing at the present day." The practice of passing babies and small children over coffins continues in Gullah Geechee communities in the Sea Islands of South Carolina and Georgia.

To connect strongly with the ancestors in Hoodoo, graveyard dirt is sometimes used. Dirt from an ancestor's grave provides protection, while dirt taken from the grave of a person who is not an ancestor is used to harm an enemy or for protection. Before taking graveyard dirt, one must pay for it with three pennies or some other form of payment. Graveyard dirt is another primary ingredient in goofer dust. It is placed inside mojo bags (conjure bags) to carry a spirit with you. Dirt from graveyards provides a means to connect to the spirits of the dead. To calm the spirits of ancestors, African Americans leave the last objects they used in life on top of their graves, believing them to contain the last essence of the person before they died, as a way of acknowledging them. The cemetery is seen as a final resting place for the dead and as a doorway to the realm of the spirits. In Hoodoo, the spirits of the dead can be petitioned or conjured to carry out certain tasks for the conjurer, either positive or negative. This practice of ancestral reverence, using graveyard dirt, working with spirits of the dead, and decorating graves of family members and giving food offerings to dead relatives so they will not haunt the family, originated in Central Africa's Kongo region. It was brought to the United States during the transatlantic slave trade. The West African practice of pouring libations continues in Hoodoo practice. Libations are given as an offering to honor and acknowledge the ancestors.

=== Spirits ===
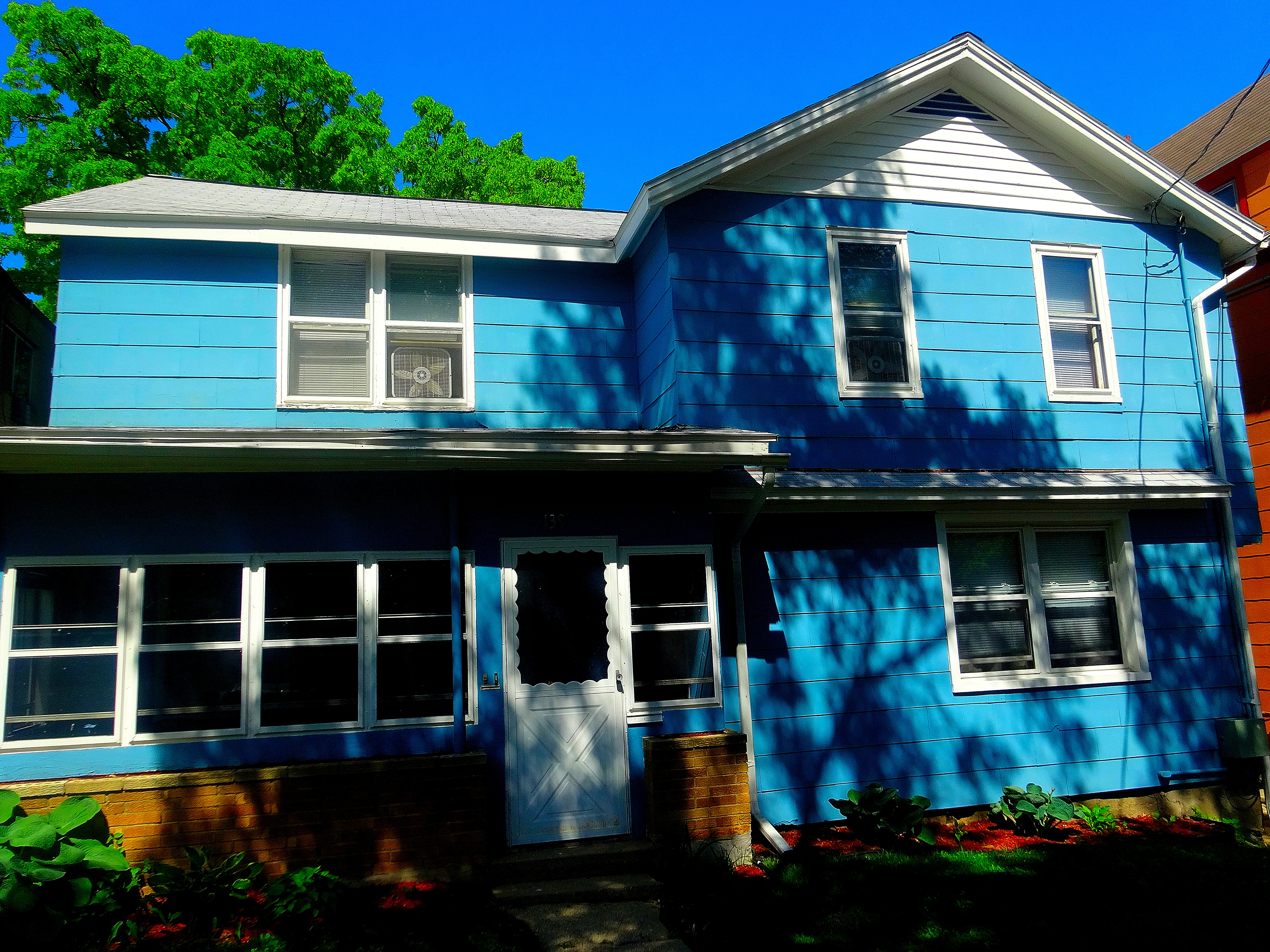
Gullah Geechee people in the Sea Islands paint their houses blue to ward off evil spirits.

==== Haints ====
A spirit that torments the living is known as a Boo Hag. Spirits are conjured to cure or kill people, and to predict the future. Spirits can also help people find things. One slave narrative from South Carolina mentioned a pastor who spoke to spirits to help him find some hidden money. This record from a slave narrative revealed how Hoodoo and the Black church were intertwined. Another slave narrative from Indiana mentioned a location that the African American population refused to enter because "it was haunted by the spirits of Black people who were beaten to death." This location was so feared by the Black people in the area that they placed a fence around it. Wearing a silver dime around the ankle or neck can protect someone from evil spirits and conjure. Another method to protect from evil spirits was to carry a small bag filled with salt and charcoal. In Indiana, African Americans sprinkled chamber lye on the front and back steps to prevent evil spirits from entering the home. Curses can come from malevolent spirits not conjured by a conjurer, and evil spirits are more active at night. Another spirit feared in Gullah culture is the plat eye. The plat eye is a one-eyed ghost that can morph into various forms. It is conjured when a person buries the head of a murdered man inside a hole with treasure.

==== Simbi ====
Communication with spirits and the dead (ancestors) is a continued practice in Hoodoo that originated in Central Africa. Nature spirits called Simbi ("Simbi" singular, and "Bisimbi" plural), believed in by the Kongo people, are associated with water and magic in Central Africa and in Hoodoo. This belief in water spirits was brought to the United States during the transatlantic slave trade and continues in the African American community in the practice of Hoodoo and Voodoo. The Bisimbi reside in gullies, streams, freshwater, and outdoor water features (fountains). Academic research on the Pooshee Plantation and Woodboo Plantation in South Carolina showed a continuing belief in water spirits among enslaved African Americans. Both plantations have been submerged under the waters of Lake Moultrie.

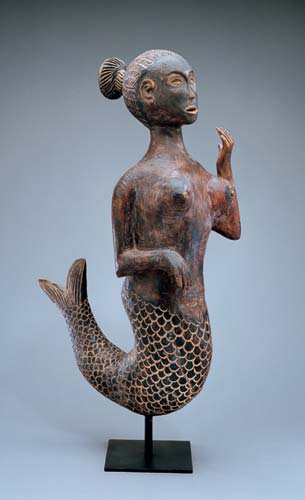
Simbi water spirit

The earliest known reference to Simbi spirits in the United States was recorded in the nineteenth century by Edmund Ruffin, a wealthy enslaver from Virginia who traveled to South Carolina "to keep the slave economic system viable through agricultural reform". In Ruffin's records, he spelled Simbi as "Cymbee" because he did not know the word's original spelling. In Ruffin's records, he recorded a few conversations he had with some of the enslaved people. One enslaved boy said he saw a Cymbee spirit running around a fountain one night while trying to get water. An enslaved man said he saw a Cymbee sitting on a plank as a boy before it glided into the water. The Simbi (Cymbee) spirits can bring healing, fertility, and prosperity. Baptisms are performed by rivers to invoke the blessings of the Simbi spirits and bring people healing, fertility, and prosperity. West Africans and African Americans wear white clothing to invoke the water spirits during such water ceremonies.

Simbi spirits reside in forests, mountains, and the water and are responsible for the life and growth of nature. These beings are considered the guardians of the lands, and the people who live on them are feared and respected. If someone disrespects a Simbi by destroying its natural habitat, the Simbi might drown them. To obtain the powers of the Bisimbi, Bakongo people in Central Africa and African Americans in the Georgia and South Carolina Lowcountry collect rocks and seashells and create minkisi bundles. Simbi spirits can appear as male or female. Some have long black hair and resemble mermaids, while others look like people with albinism. In West-Central Africa, there are folk stories of people meeting mermaids. In African American folklore, there is a story about a girl named Sukey meeting a mermaid named Mama Jo, who helps protect Sukey and financially supports her by giving her gold coins.

In the Kongo culture, people "become" Simbi spirits after death. Therefore, ancestors in the Kongo culture are called by that name. It is believed one's soul returns to God after death, however, the spirit may remain on Earth. Spirits can interact with the world by providing good fortune or causing evil deeds. Ancestors are essential spirits in Hoodoo that intercede in people's lives, providing guidance and protection, and are revered. The practice in Hoodoo of ancestral veneration through prayers and offerings had its origins in Africa. In Hoodoo, ancestors can appear to provide information and guidance in people's dreams. However, they are offended when they are not revered and may cause trouble in the lives of a family's members.

==== Ghosts ====
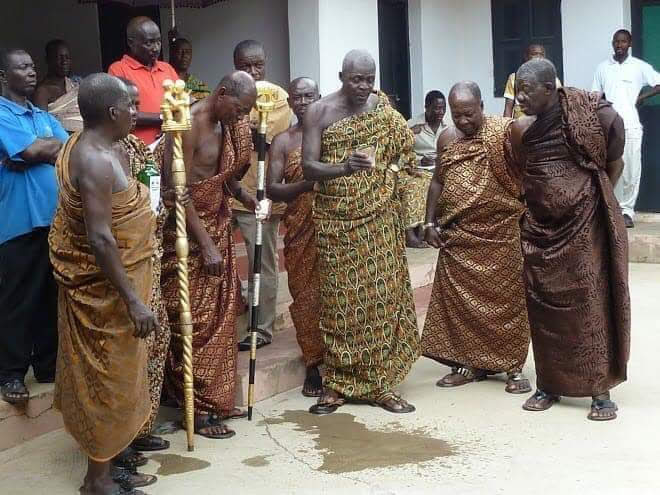
In Hoodoo, the pouring of libations is an African practice.

Those people on the west coast of Africa, the Ewe-speaking natives, make offerings such as food or drinks, usually pouring palm wine and banana beer over an ancestor's grave. Church members are commonly known to be buried with their feet facing east so they can rise on the last day towards the sun, whereas sinners are buried the opposite way to avoid being harmed by the light. Another tale is that ghosts cannot cross water. A mirror ceremony is held if a hoodoo doctor wants to conjure a ghost across the water. Spirits who have died from sickness in bed can walk among the living any night other than Friday night, which is reserved for those who have died in the dark.

Those who have died because of their capturers can get justice in the afterlife by using Hoodoo. For example, "If a murder victim is buried in a sitting position, the murderer will be speedily brought to justice." The victim who is sitting in front of the heavenly throne can request justice to be done. Leaving an egg in a murdered victim's hand can prevent whoever took their life from wandering too far from the scene. The victim is holding the egg, representing the life of the murderer.

== Practices ==
=== Seeking ===
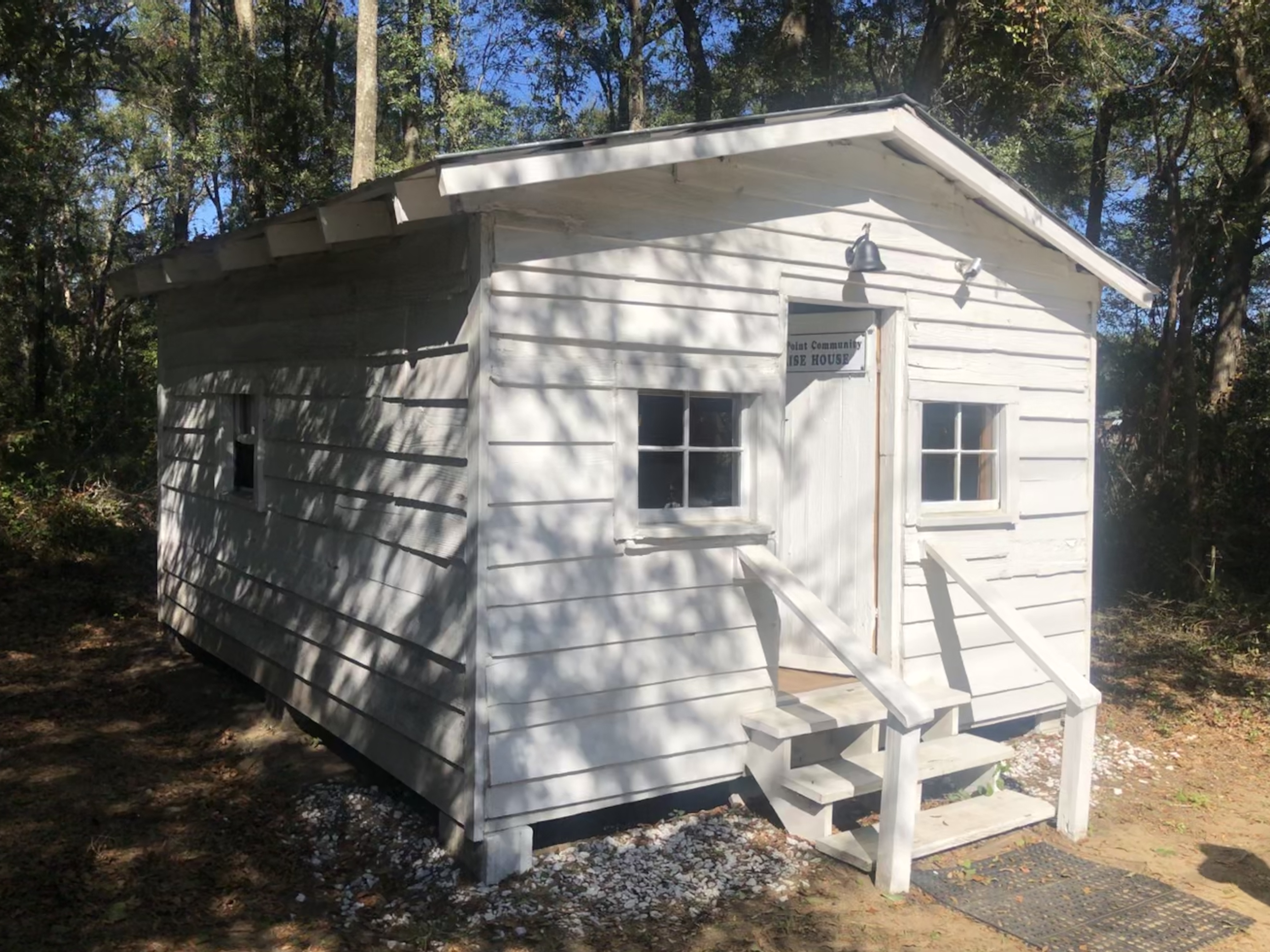
Coffin Point Praise House

In a process known as "seeking", a hoodoo practitioner will ask for the salvation of a person's soul for a Gullah church to accept them. A spiritual leader will assist in the process, and after believing the follower is ready, they will announce it to the church. A ceremony will commence with much singing and a ring shout practice. The word "shout" is derived from the West African Muslim word saut, meaning "dancing or moving around the Kaaba".

The ring shout in Black churches (African American churches) originates from African styles of dance. Counterclockwise circle dancing is practiced in West and Central Africa to invoke the spirits of the ancestors and for spirit possession. The ring shout and shouting look similar to the possession of the African spirit. In Hoodoo, African Americans perform the ring shout to become touched or possessed by the Holy Spirit and to communicate with the spirits of dead ancestors. African Americans replaced African spirits with the Christian God (Holy Spirit) during possession. In African American churches, this is called "catching the spirit." African Americans use music, clapping, and singing during the ring shout and in modern-day shouting in Black churches to bring down the spirit. The singing during the ring shout has Christian meaning using biblical references.

During slavery, enslaved Africans were forced to become Christian, which resulted in a blend of African and Christian spiritual practices that shaped Hoodoo. As a result, Hoodoo was and continues to be practiced in some Black churches in the United States. In the Gullah/Geechee Cultural Heritage Corridor area, praise houses are places where African Americans gather to have church and perform healing rituals and the ring shout.

=== Initiations ===
This process of seeking in Hoodoo, accompanied by the ring shout, is also an initiation into Hoodoo. African Americans in the Sea Islands (Gullah Geechee people) performed initiations of community members by combining West African initiation practices with Christian practices called "Seeking Jesus." Young people spent time in nature "seeking Jesus" and received guidance from Black religious leaders. The spiritual mothers of the African American community provided prophetic guidance to those "seeking." After their initiation, initiates were accepted into the religious Black community. Zora Neale Hurston wrote about her initiation into Hoodoo in her book Mules and Men published in 1935.

Hurston explained her initiation into Hoodoo included wrapping snakeskins around her body and lying on a couch (sofa) for three days nude so she could have a vision and acceptance from the spirits. In addition to lying on a couch nude wrapped in snakeskins for her initiation, Hurston had to drink the blood of the Hoodoo doctors who initiated her from a wine glass cup. There are other ways people become a Hoodoo doctor, such as being born into a family of practitioners or through a mentor under an apprenticeship. Initiations are not required to become a Hoodoo doctor or rootworker. Other Hoodoo initiations include ritual isolations, learning about charms, herbs, roots, and dream lore from a community elder.

=== Burial traditions ===
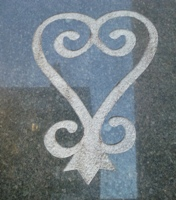
A Sankofa Symbol was etched onto the memorial wall at the African Burial Ground National Monument.

Archaeologists discovered evidence of continued West-Central African burial practices in a section of Lower Manhattan, New York City, which is now the location of the African Burial Ground National Monument. Along with historians involved in the project, they noted that about 15,000 Africans were buried in a section of Lower Manhattan called the "Negroes Burial Ground". Only 419 Africans buried were exhumed; over 500 artifacts were excavated, showing continued African traditions in New York City's Black community. Of 146 beads recovered, nine of them had come from West Africa. The other beads were manufactured in Europe; these had also been used by enslaved and free people for burial practices, incorporating an African spiritual interpretation of European beads. For example, many of the Africans buried, including women, men, and children, had beads, waist beads, and wristlets. In some African societies, beads are believed to bring protection, wealth, fertility, and health to the wearer. In contrast, in West Africa, African women wear beads around their waist as markers of beauty. Also found were beads still wrapped around the waist of the remains of enslaved women and about 200 shells. Beads, shells, and iron bars are associated with the Yoruba deity Olokun, a spirit that owns the sea. Shells are associated with water and help the soul transition in the afterlife because seashells help the soul move from the realm of the living into the realm of the dead (ancestors), which is associated with water. Other artifacts found at the African Burial Ground were shiny objects and reflective materials. Africans used these to communicate with spirits because shiny and reflective materials were thought to be able to capture the "flash of the spirit". Between 1626 and the 1660s, the majority of Africans imported to colonial New York were from the Kongo-Angolan region because New York had been colonized by the New York Dutch, whose merchants carried on trade with the west-central coast of West Africa. Historians and archaeologists found Kongo-related artifacts at the African Burial Ground, such as minkisi and Nkisi bundles buried with African remains. These Nkisi and minkisi bundles became the conjure bags in Hoodoo.

After 1679, the majority of Africans imported to colonial New York were from West Africa because the colonial rule of New York shifted from the Dutch to the English in 1664. West Africans imported to the colony included Akan, Fon, Yoruba, and other ethnic groups. These diverse African ethnic groups brought their traditional cultures with them and adorned their dead with adornments made from American materials but with an African design and meaning. The excavations revealed an indication of Ghanaian burial practice when a funerary clay pipe with a Ghanaian design called ebua was discovered with the remains of an African American woman. Also excavated at the site were conjure bags (mojo bags)—these conjuring bundles had crystals, roots, beads, feathers, animal parts, and other items for protection from malign forces and to communicate with spirits. Other artifacts found at the site that linked to West Africa, researchers suggest, was the finding of an Akan Sankofa Symbol on a coffin. The Akan Sankofa Adinkra symbol was a means to remember one's ancestors and look to the future while not forgetting the past. West African spiritual beliefs were mixed with the Christian faith, and free and enslaved West Africans started their own African Methodist Episcopal Zion Churches in New York City. The African Burial Ground reserved a location called the Ancestral Libation Chamber for people to perform spiritual ceremonies to pay their respects to the enslaved and free Africans buried at the monument. African Americans and other African-descended people continue to travel to the African Burial Ground from across the country and around the world and perform libation ceremonies to honor the 15,000-plus African people buried in New York City.

Researchers found burial practices by African Americans in Florida that were similar to those of Bantu-Kongo peoples. Researchers noticed the similarities between the grave sites of African Americans in Florida and those of the Bakongo people in Central Africa. Headstones with a T shape were seen in Black cemeteries and at grave sites in the Kongo region. The T-shaped headstone peculiar to Black cemeteries in North Florida during the 1920s through the 1950s corresponds to the lower half of the Kongo cosmogram that symbolizes the realm of the ancestors and spiritual power. In Bantu-Kongo spirituality, the spirit realm is white. African Americans decorated the graves of their family members with white items such as white conch seashells, representing the watery divide located on the horizontal line of the Kongo cosmogram that is a boundary between the realm of the living and the realm of the dead. By placing seashells on graves, African Americans were creating a boundary (barrier) between the recently deceased and them, keeping the spirit in the realm of the dead below the Kongo cosmogram. Another reason was to guide the recently deceased into the ancestral realm or return their spirit back to Africa.

During the 1930s-1940s, Alabama Cajans, as devout believers in conjure, were seen to place objects on top of their graves, such as shards of fine china, broken pitchers, or empty bottles. In the Kongo region, Bakongo people placed broken objects on top of graves so the recently deceased could travel to the land of the dead. The broken items symbolized that the person's connection to the living was broken by death and that they needed to return to the realm of the dead. Placing seashells on top of graves in African American cemeteries continued beyond the 1950s. It was noted by researchers in Archer, Florida, and in other African American cemeteries in the state, as well as among the Gullah Geechee people in the Sea Islands of Georgia. The conjure practices of the Gullah Geechee were influenced by Bakongo and other West African ethnic groups when a slave ship, Wanderer, illegally imported 409 enslaved Africans to Jekyll Island, Georgia, in 1858.

=== Bottle tree ===
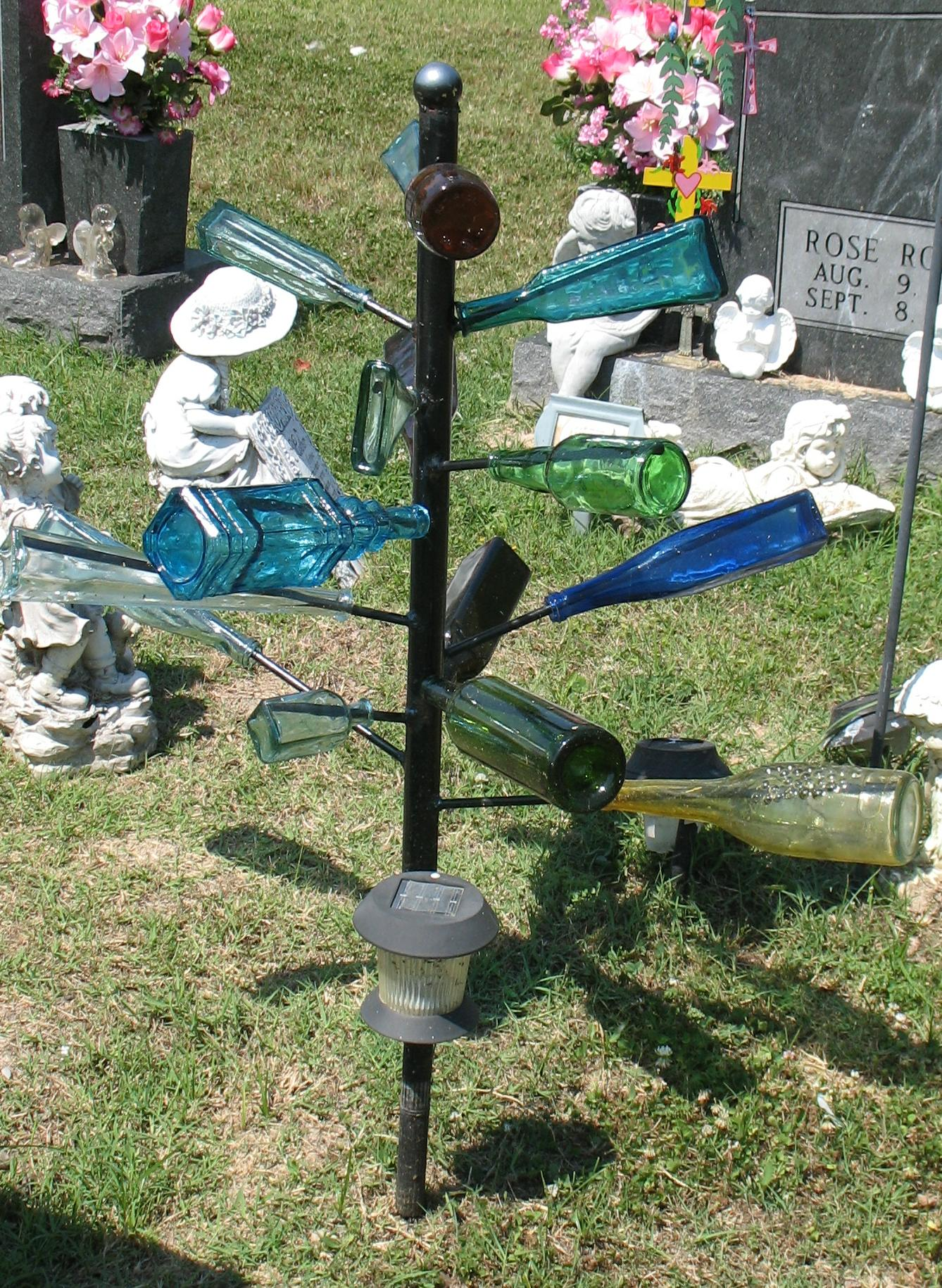
Bottle Tree in Central Holmes Cemetery (Yazoo County, Mississippi)

Hoodoo is linked to a popular tradition of bottle trees in the United States. According to gardener and glass bottle researcher Felder Rushing, the use of bottle trees came to the Old South from Africa with the slave trade. The use of blue bottles is linked to the "haint blue" spirit specifically. Glass bottle trees have become a popular garden decoration throughout the South and Southwest. According to academic research, bottle trees originated in the Kongo region of Central Africa. African-descended people in the African Diaspora decorated trees with bottles, plates, pieces of broken pots, and other items to drive away evil. This practice was brought to the United States during the transatlantic slave trade. The purpose of bottle trees is to protect a home or a location from evil spirits by trapping them inside the bottles. The spirits are said to be attracted to the sunlight that flickers inside the bottle. As the sunlight passes through it, the spirit is trapped in the bottle and banished with the sunlight. Sometimes, items such as stones or graveyard dirt are placed inside the bottle to attract the spirit further.

=== Personal concerns ===
In Hoodoo, personal concerns such as hair, nail clippings, bones, blood, and other bodily fluids are mixed with ingredients for either a positive or a negative effect. The items are placed inside conjure bags or jars and mixed with roots, herbs, and animal parts, sometimes ground into a powder or with graveyard dirt from a murdered victim's grave. The cursed items are buried under a person's porch steps to cause misfortune. To prevent being "fixed" (cursed), it is considered a good idea to burn loose hairs, combed or fallen from the head, so a conjurer cannot make a cursing powder from a person's hair. Placing personal concerns in containers and burying them to cause harm was practiced in West African countries such as Nigeria and Benin.

=== Offerings ===
The West-Central African practice of leaving food offerings for deceased relatives and feeding and petitioning other spirits by giving them offerings of food, water, or rum (whiskey) continues in the practice of Hoodoo. Providing spirits offerings of libation empowers the spirits and honors them by acknowledging their existence. These offerings of food, liquids, or poured libations are left at gravesites or a tree. This custom is still practiced in the Central African country of Gabon and other parts of Africa and was brought to the United States during the period of the transatlantic slave trade. This was also documented by folklorist Puckett. African Americans poured libations at the four corners of Congo Square at midnight during a dark moon for a Hoodoo ritual.

=== Commonly used items ===
Conjure can be made using many things or nothing at all. There are certain items commonly used in Hoodoo if needed. "Fast Luck" and "Red Fast Luck" are herbal scrubs that bring luck into stores or a person's life. "Essence of Van Van" and "Fast Scrubbing Essence" are mixtures of one to thirteen oils containing herbs such as cinnamon, wintergreen, and lavender. Colors are also important in Hoodoo to conjure different results the person is looking for. For example, "Red, for victory. Pink, for love (some say for drawing success). Green, to drive off (some say for success), Blue, for success and protection (for causing death also), Yellow, for money, Brown, for drawing money and people." Brick powder is commonly used in Hoodoo to remove and protect from evil by placing red brick dust at the entrance of a home.

== Divination ==
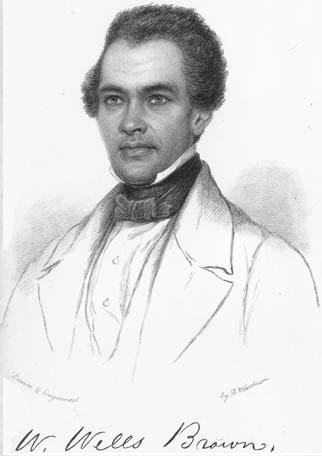
William Wells Brown wrote in his autobiography that he spoke with an enslaved fortune-teller named Frank to learn if his escape from slavery on the Underground Railroad would be successful.

Divination in Hoodoo originated from African practices. In West-Central Africa, divination was, and still is, used to determine what an individual or a community should know that is important for survival and spiritual balance. In Africa and American Hoodoo, people turn to divination, seeking guidance from an elder or a skilled diviner about major changes in their lives. Conjure doctors diagnose illnesses and determine treatments using divination. This practice was brought to the United States during the transatlantic slave trade and was later influenced by other divination systems. There are several forms of divination traditionally used in Hoodoo.

=== Astrology ===
Practitioners sometimes incorporate planetary and elemental energies in their spiritual work (spells). Numerology is also used in Hoodoo and combined with astrology for spiritual works. African Americans in Indiana have combined numerology, astrology, African mysticism, Voodoo, and Hoodoo to create a new spiritual divination practice and system of magic unique to African Americans. Rootworkers there trained under African American astrologers in Black communities. Blacks in the United States have historically looked to astrology for guidance. For example, Nat Turner took the sign of an eclipse of the sun as a sign from God to start his slave revolt in Southampton County, Virginia, in 1831.

=== Augury ===
The practice of Augury is deciphering phenomena (omens) that are believed to foretell the future, often signifying the advent of change. Before his rebellion, Nat Turner had visions and omens from spirits to free the enslaved through armed resistance. In African American communities, a child born with a caul over their face is believed to have psychic gifts to see spirits and see into the future. This belief in the caul bringing psychic gifts was found in West Africa, particularly in Benin (Dahomey). After the baby is born, the caul is removed, preserved, and used to drive away or banish ghosts. It is believed that a child born at midnight will have second sight or extrasensory perception of events.

=== Cartomancy ===
Cartomancy is the practice of using Tarot and poker playing cards to receive messages from spirits. This form of divination was added later in Hoodoo. Some Hoodoo practitioners use both.

=== Cleromancy ===
Cleromancy is casting small objects such as shells, bones, stalks, coins, nuts, stones, dice, and sticks for an answer from spirits. The use of such items is a form of divination used in Africa and Hoodoo in the United States.

=== Destiny ===
In traditional African religions, people are given a destiny from the Supreme God. It is believed that someone can alter parts of their destiny through rituals and conjure. This is true in religions such as Ifá, where a skilled conjurer can alter a person's destiny through divinities or evil forces. This means a conjurer can shorten someone's life by conjuring death onto them. A conjurer can protect a person's destiny from another conjurer trying to change it. To know a person's destiny, divination is used. Divination is also used to know what rituals should be performed and what charms should be worn to protect or alter a person's destiny.

=== Domino divination ===
Rootworkers also divine with dominoes.

=== Oneiromancy ===
Oneiromancy is a form of divination based on dreams. Formerly enslaved people talked about receiving messages from ancestors and spirits concerning imminent danger or receiving advice on how to save money. Harriet Tubman believed her dreams were given to her by God to inform her how to rescue her family from slavery on the Underground Railroad. Tubman told biographers she had dreams of flying over fields, which let her know where to go and where the safe places were to hide freedom seekers.

=== Walking boy ===
The walking boy was a traditional form of divination practiced by African Americans on slave plantations, and the practice continued after chattel slavery. A conjurer would take a bottle, tie a string, and place a bug inside it. The conjurer pulled the bottle as the bug moved. The direction in which the bug moved inside the bottle revealed to the conjurer where a spell bottle was buried that caused misfortune or where the person who buried the bottle lived.

Enslaved African Americans held diviners in high respect, believing that they knew about unknown events and that, using divination, conjurers could tell if an enslaved person would be whipped, sold, or escape to freedom. Autobiographies of formerly enslaved people tell about enslaved people seeking counsel from enslaved diviners.

== Relationship with the Spiritual church movement ==
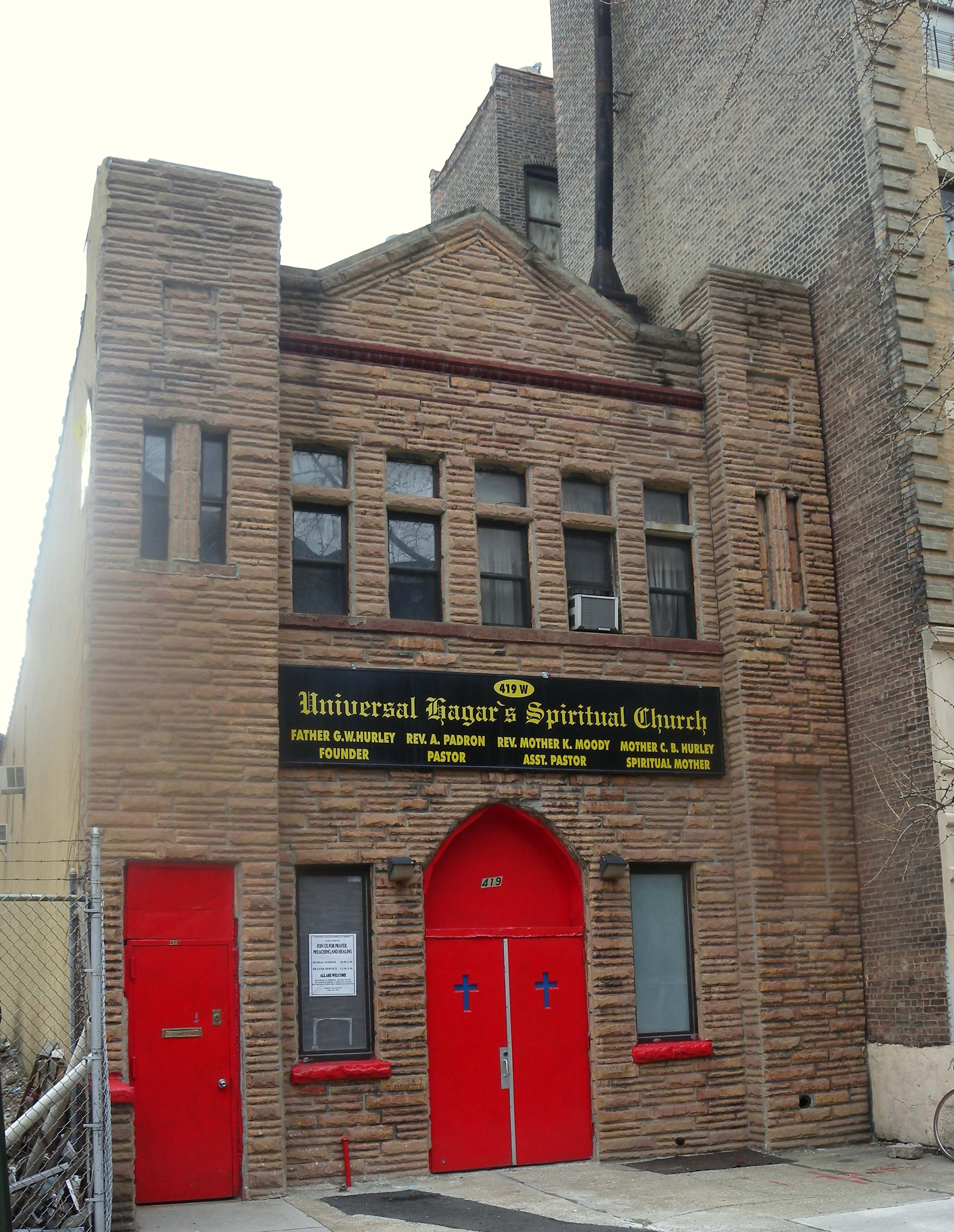
Universal Hagar's Spiritual Church, New York City

The Spiritual church movement in the United States began in the mid-nineteenth century. The African American community became a part of this movement in the early twentieth century, and numerous Spiritual churches are in African American communities. African Americans started independent Spiritual churches as a way for them to hide their African practices from whites by synchronizing African traditions with the Christian faith. Some Black Spiritual churches incorporated elements of Hoodoo and Voodoo practices. Zora Neale Hurston documented Spiritual churches that incorporated Hoodoo practices. A Spiritual church in New Orleans called the Temple of the Innocent Blood was led by an African American woman, Mother Catherine Seals, who performed Hoodoo to heal her clients. Mother Seals healed a church member by sacrificing a live chicken, slitting its throat, and tying it to a person's leg for two days. This is a continued African tradition of using chickens to heal and conjure protection. Hurston noted that Mother Seals incorporated other African Diaspora practices into her Spiritual church and observed her reverence for a Haitian Vodou snake loa spirit, Damballa. A snake design was painted on a wall at Mother Seals' church, while another African American Spiritual church leader had a plastic snake on his altar. Snake reverence among African Americans in Voodoo and Hoodoo originates from West Africa. This Spiritual church had a branch in Memphis, Tennessee, which African Americans attended to practice Hoodoo secretly inside the church. New Orleans and Memphis have several Spiritual churches where Hoodoo and Voudoo are practiced. Rituals of healing, communing with ancestral spirits, worship services, shouting, eclectic belief systems, Hoodoo, and elaborate Voodoo rituals were performed inside the churches.

Washington "Doc" Harris, an African American from Memphis, Tennessee, founded the Saint Paul Spiritual Holy Temple. The Black people in the area nicknamed the Spiritual church as "Voodoo Village." Although no actual Voodoo existed inside his Spiritual church, Hoodoo was practiced in the church. Doc Harris was known to make mojo bags that looked similar to the Kongo-based minkisi bundles for removing curses from people using Hoodoo. Doc Harris built his church in a secluded area in the Black community so he and his family could practice their traditions in private. African Americans in Spiritual churches blended African spiritual traditions with Christian practices, creating a uniquely African American religion. African American Hoodoo religious and spiritual leaders in Spiritual churches did not refer to themselves as rootworkers or hoodoo doctors, but as "spiritual advisors" to avoid negative attention from their community and the local authorities. Hiding Hoodoo practices inside Black churches was necessary for African Americans because some people were lynched for practicing Hoodoo. In September 1901, the Chicago Tribune newspaper reported two people were lynched for practicing hoodooism. Despite these circumstances, African American Spiritual churches provided food and other services for the Black community.

=== Relationship with the Sanctified Church ===
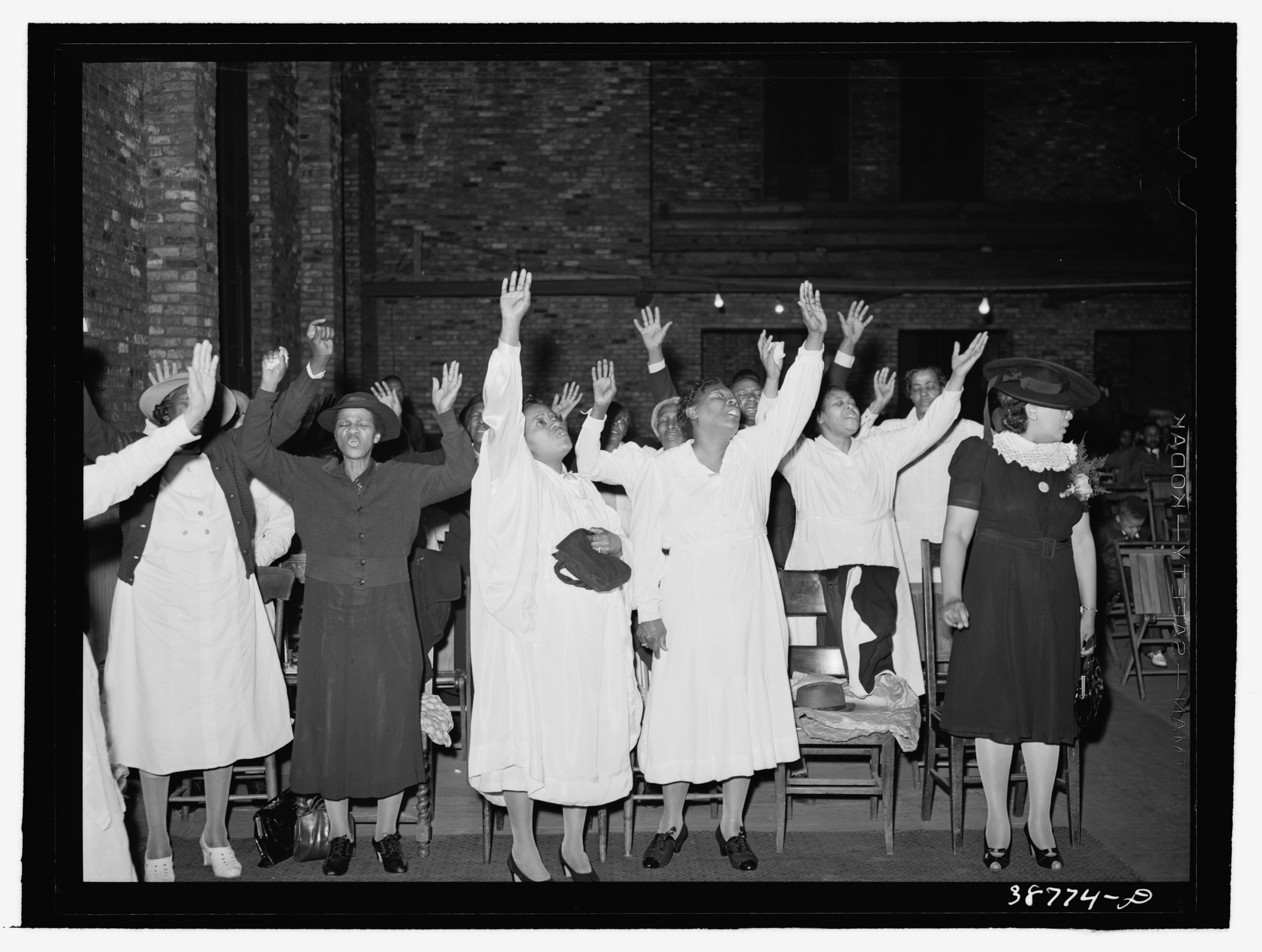
African American conjurers and rootworkers identified as Christian and incorporated the Bible into Hoodoo.

Another spiritual institution where African Americans hid their Hoodoo practices was the Sanctified Church, started in Memphis, Tennessee. In the early twentieth century, Bishop Charles Harrison Mason and other African American ministers founded the Church of God in Christ, which has a predominantly African American membership. Bishop Mason was known among his congregation to heal members using roots, herbs, and anointing oil. Bishop Mason and other Pentecostal pastors were rootworkers and used spiritual tools to remove demons and curses from church members. The removal of evil spirits in Black Pentecostal churches involves prayer, playing Black gospel music, anointing oils, and other Hoodoo tools.

Author Zora Neale Hurston wrote in her book The Sanctified Church about the spiritual beliefs and conjure practices of the Black congregation in Sanctified Churches. African Americans talked about nailing a horseshoe over the door to ward off evil and making conjure balls to remove diseases. British historians traced the origins of conjure balls in Hoodoo to the West African practice of creating gris-gris charms and the Central African practice of creating minkisi containers. As white spiritual merchants exploited Hoodoo and turned it into just tricks and spells, African Americans moved more of the traditional Hoodoo practices—such as animal sacrifice, incorporating animal parts in spiritual work, Holy Ghost shouting, the ring shout, and other practices—underground and synchronized them with Christianity. Some Sanctified Churches in African American communities continue to incorporate Hoodoo. African American religious institutions are not just places of worship and spirituality but also places to discuss injustices in their communities and how to unite to bring about political and spiritual transformations for African Americans.

=== In the African American Faith movement ===
Hoodoo functioned more as a tool of spiritual healing within Black Protestantism. African American pastors combined Pentecostalism and African-derived traditions of Hoodoo, Voodoo, conjure, and rootwork to heal church members of physical and spiritual ailments. Prosperity theology was taught to church members, as they believed God wanted his children to be prosperous, and prosperity came to those who had faith in God. For example, Reverend Ike preached prosperity to his congregation. African American faith movements emphasize having faith in God's power through fasting, prayer, and sometimes using conjure. Some Black church members believed the power to heal, prophecy, conjure, and curse came from God. However, other church members believed the power to curse came from Satan and that only God's power could remove a demonic curse. Deliverance ministry was preached by Black ministers to wage warfare against demons, which was also a part of Hoodoo culture—believing that praying to God and ancestral spirits could remove demonic curses.

=== Black American faith healers ===
Black faith healers identified as Christian, attended Spiritual churches, and healed church members by laying on their hands, using herbal medicines, and sometimes combining conjure to remove curses and heal physical ailments. Some were also astrologers. Black Americans who practiced Hoodoo called themselves faith healers, herbalists, or divine healers to distinguish themselves from members of their community who practiced conjure to harm people. This tradition of faith healing has its roots in the slave community. When enslaved people needed healing, they searched for members of the slave community who knew herbalism and how to perform spiritual healing.

== In literature ==
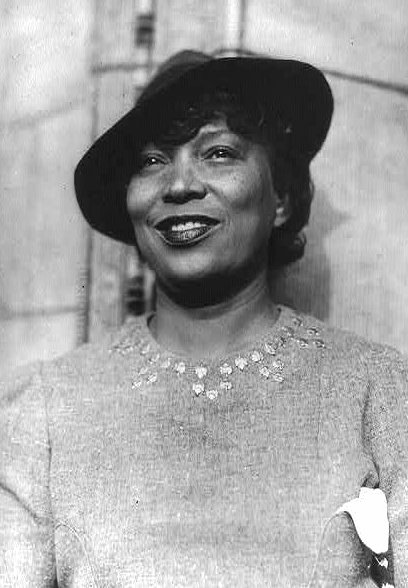
In 1935, Zora Neale Hurston published Mules and Men, her first book about African American folklore and Hoodoo. In 1938, Hurston published Tell My Horse, a book about the practice of Obeah in Jamaica and the practice of Vodou in Haiti.

Zora Neale Hurston often employs Hoodoo imagery and references in her writing. In Sweat, the protagonist Delia is a washwoman who fears snakes. Her cruel husband, Sykes, is a devotee of Li Grande Zombi and uses her ophidiophobia against her to establish dominance. Delia learns Voodoo and Hoodoo and manages to hex Sykes. Another book by Hurston features Hoodoo hexes and spells and a Hoodoo doctor. Hurston's professional career was as an anthropologist and a writer. She documented African American folklore and spiritual practices in Black communities in the United States and the Caribbean. Hurston traveled to Eatonville, Florida, and New Orleans, Louisiana, writing about the spiritual practices of Black people, and publishing her findings in books and articles that provided readers with knowledge of African American spirituality. In 2023, the Public Broadcasting Service created a series of documentaries about Zora Neale Hurston and her research on Black folklore in the African Diaspora and African American spirituality. The series documents Hurston's life and her experience in collecting information on Hoodoo in Black communities in the South, showing photos and interviews with Hurston and her thoughts about African American folk magic, her Hoodoo initiation experience, and her travels to Haiti documenting Vodou.

Charles Waddell Chesnutt was a mixed-race African American author who wrote African American folklore, using fiction to reference the culture of Hoodoo in his writings. In 1899, Chesnutt published The Conjure Woman, which tells the story of African Americans after the Civil War and how they used conjure to fix their everyday problems. Additionally, Chesnutt does not portray the African American characters in the book as racially inferior to whites. The African Americans in the book use their wit and intelligence, combining Hoodoo practices to solve their problems. The writing style is phonetic, with Chesnutt using dialogue with language as spoken by African Americans in the South during his time. This provides readers with an example of African American Vernacular and culture. The book also discusses the North's economic opportunist exploitation of the South during the Reconstruction Era and how African Americans navigated this process in their communities.

Another writer who focused on African American spirituality in their literature is Ishmael Reed. Reed criticizes the erasure of African Americans from the American frontier narrative, as well as exposing the racist context of the American dream and the cultural evolution of the military-industrial complex. He explores the role of Hoodoo in forging a uniquely African American culture. He writes about the Neo-HooDoo aesthetic in African American culture, such as dance, poetry, and quilting. His book Mumbo Jumbo has many references to Hoodoo. Mumbo Jumbo has been considered to represent the relationship between the Westernized African American narrative and the demands of the Western literary canon, and the African tradition at the heart of Hoodoo that has defied assimilation. In his book Yellow Back Radio Broke-Down, the protagonist, the Loop Garoo Kid, acts as an American frontier traveler with the Hoodoo church and curses 'Drag Gibson', the monocultural white American landowner.

In Mama Day by Gloria Naylor, Mama Day is a conjure woman with a comprehensive knowledge of plants and the ability to contact her ancestors. The book focuses on the benevolent aspects of Hoodoo as a means for elders to help the community and carry on tradition, with her saving Bernice's fertility. Sassafrass, Cypress & Indigo also explores the deep connection between community empowerment and Hoodoo. In the story, Indigo has healing abilities and makes Hoodoo dolls.

Yvonne Chireau from Swarthmore College studied the depictions of Hoodoo and Voodoo in comic books from 1931 to 1993. White comic book creators portrayed Black folk religions as evil, showing demonic possessions in comic books. Blackfaced stereotypical images of African Americans were drawn in comics to vilify Black people and their folk religions. Black American comic book creators portrayed Hoodoo and Voodoo in their comics as tools against white supremacy. Black creators had story scenes in their comics of Black superheroes using their Hoodoo conjure powers to save their people and defeat white supremacists. In 1973, Marvel Comics created a character called Brother Voodoo who stands and fights for justice using his conjure powers.

Toni Morrison references African American spirituality in her literature. Morrison's novel, Song of Solomon published in 1977, tells the story of the character Milkman, an African American in search of his African ancestors. Milkman lived in the North but returned to the South for his ancestry. By the end of the book, Milkman learns he comes from a family of African medicine people, gains his ancestral powers, and his soul flies back to Africa after he dies. Morrison's idea of Milkman flying back to Africa was inspired by a historical event in Georgia that has become a part of African American folklore of flying Africans. In 1803, a slave ship landed on the coast of Georgia in St. Simons Island with captive Africans from Nigeria, including a cargo of Igbo people. Some of the Igbo people chose suicide rather than a lifetime of slavery by walking into the swamp and drowning. This location became known as Igbo Landing in Georgia. According to African American folklore, the Igbos who committed suicide had their souls fly back to Africa.

An African American pre-med student at James Madison University wrote a teen novel published in 2021 titled Me (Moth), about an African American youth named Moth whose grandmother is a Hoodoo practitioner. In the book, Moth searches for her cultural roots after several deaths in her family.

=== Neo-Hoodoo ===
Coined by Ismael Reed in 1970, the term "Neo-Hoodoo" celebrates the practices of rituals, folklore, and spirituality in the Americas beyond Christianity and traditional religion. "Neo-Hoodoo believes that every man is an artist and a priest. You can bring your own creative ideas to Neo-Hoodoo." Neo-Hoodoo celebrates Hoodoo in a way that Black practitioners fully express. It is often described as "...terms that respect the syncretism of Voudon-based religious systems". It can be seen as a way of doing things that provides "the Black Artist with a vehicle to merge art with politics without compromising". Neo-Hoodoo is a behavior that gives "'...non-Western voices which express life and creativity' intrude on or break the 'controlling patterns' of the 'dominant culture'". This is a radical form of Black writing that inspires resistance to suppression in the literary world.

The ideas expressed in "A Portrait of the Artist as a Shadow of His Former Self" by Kerry James Marshall are compared to Ishmael Reed's Neo-Hoodoo concept of balancing invisibility as visual. The painter describes his work ethic for the painting as being to "...bring that figure close to being a stereotypical representation without collapsing completely into stereotype". The postcolonial theory of Hoodoo and the fact that Hoodoo is neo-African still leads to assumptions that it is uncivilized. Reed's Hoodoo aesthetic celebrates syncretism as a religious cultural practice, countering Western Civilization's desire to universalize itself through Christianity.

=== Slave narratives ===
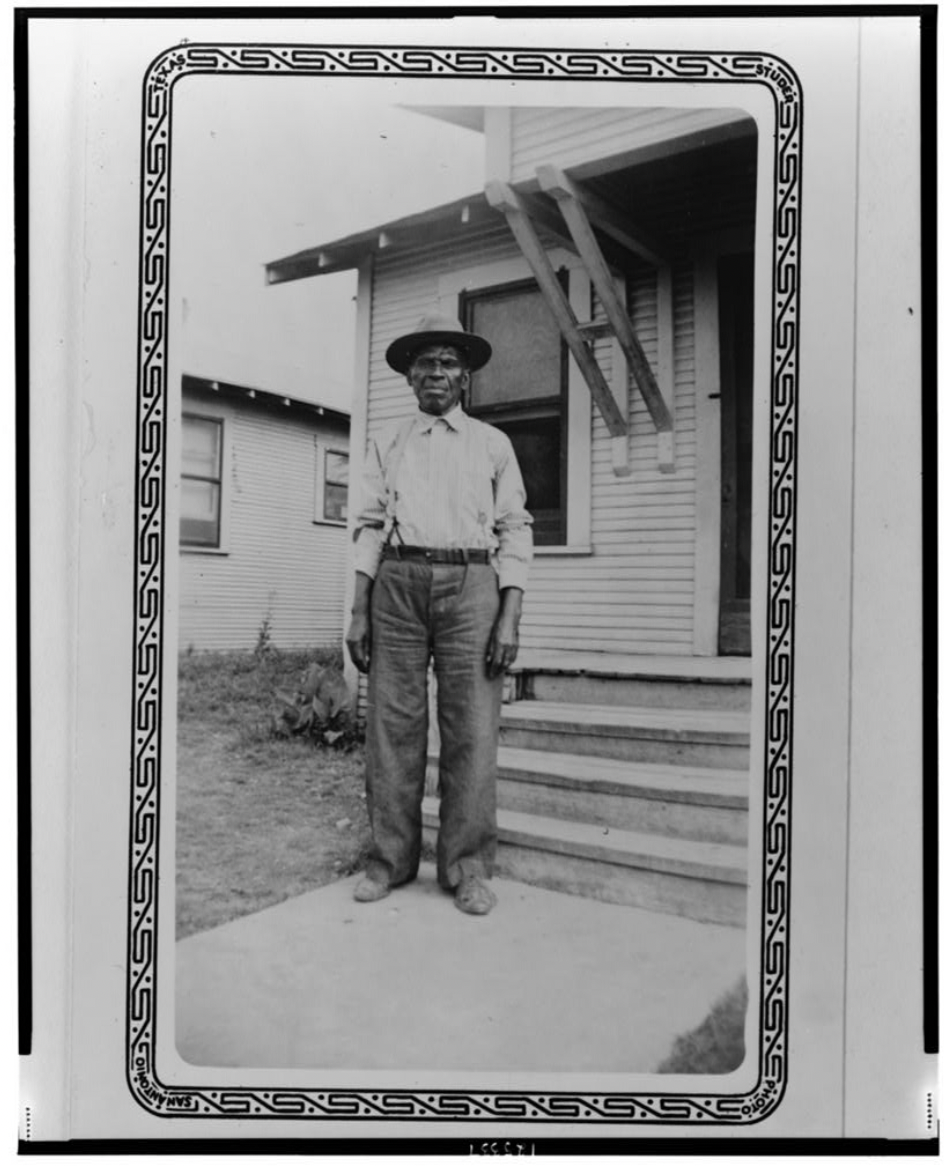
Photo of an ex-slave William Watkins from the WPA slave narratives.

In the 1930s, the Federal Writers' Project, part of the Works Progress Administration during the Great Depression, provided jobs for unemployed writers to write and collect the experiences of formerly enslaved people. Writers, both Black and white, documented the experiences of the last generation of African Americans born into slavery. Formerly enslaved African Americans told writers about their slave experiences, providing readers with a glimpse into the lives of the enslaved. Slave narratives revealed the culture of African Americans during slavery. Formerly enslaved African Americans talked about conjure, rootwork, Hoodoo, healing with herbs, removing curses, talking to spirits, using graveyard dirt to curse people, divination with cards and a walking boy, Hoodoo in Black churches, hiding conjure practices from their enslavers, cursing their enslavers, animal sacrifice, and other conjure practices. "Hoodoo, as used in the ex-slave narratives, is used to describe attempts to control the actions and health of other people (or prevent others from controlling you) through the use of potions, charms, and incantations." Some of the formerly enslaved African Americans told writers what region of Africa their family was from. These regions were the Kongo or areas in West Africa. The Library of Congress has 2,300 first-person accounts from formerly enslaved people in their digital archive.

In slave narratives, African Americans revealed that some of them were kidnapped directly from Africa and brought to America. These slave narratives coincide with the illegal slave trade. In 1807, the 9th United States Congress passed an act that prohibited the importation of slaves from Africa. However, this act did not stop the illegal smuggling of enslaved Africans to the United States. The illegal slave trade continued into the 1860s and sometimes resulted in a re-Africanization of African American culture with the importation of new Africans to the United States. Some of these illegal slave trades were documented in American history. For example, the slave ship the Wanderer landed in Jekyll Island, Georgia in 1858 with a cargo of 409 Africans. The Wanderer departed near the Congo River in Central Africa.

In the 1930s, a local chapter of the Federal Writers' Project in Savannah, Georgia, called the Georgia Writers' Project, interviewed formerly enslaved people and descendants of formerly enslaved people who either came directly from Africa on the slave ship the Wanderer or had a family member come from Africa on the Wanderer. They published their findings in a book called, "Drums and Shadows: Survival Studies Among the Georgia Coastal Negroes." The Georgia Writers' Project documented Hoodoo and conjure practices among African Americans in Georgia and traced the practices to West Africa and the Kongo region, as some African Americans knew what region in Africa a family member was from. One woman interviewed in St. Simons, Georgia said her father came from Africa on the Wanderer slave ship. She thinks her father was Igbo, and he talked about his life in Africa, the culture there, and how it survived in her family. Other African Americans interviewed talked about the origins of their conjure practices from the Ewe and Kongo people. For example, in West Africa, graveyard dirt is placed inside conjure bags to protect against Juju. The West African practice of using graveyard dirt continues in the United States in Black communities today in the African American tradition of Hoodoo.

Africatown, north of Mobile, Alabama, is another legacy of the illegal slave trade and African culture in the United States. In 2012, Africatown was placed on the National Register of Historic Places for its significance in African American history. On July 8, 1860, the slave ship Clotilda was the last slave ship to transport Africans to the United States. The Clotilda entered the Mississippi Sound in Alabama with 110 Africans. The Africans imported to Alabama illegally came from West Africa, and the ethnic groups coming from the region were Atakora, Ewe, Fon, and Yoruba. Each group brought their religions and languages. Some in the group practiced West African Vodun, Islam, and the Yoruba religion. Mobile, Alabama, became the home for these diverse Africans, where their religious and spiritual practices blended with Christianity. After the Civil War, a group of 32 Africans founded a community, calling it Africatown. In the community, they practiced African burial practices for their dead. African names were given to their children so they would know what region in Africa their ancestry was from. Zora Neale Hurston wrote a book about Africatown called, Barracoon: The Story of the Last "Black Cargo". Hurston interviewed Cudjoe Lewis, one of the founders of Africatown and one of the few who survived the last Middle Passage to the United States.

Scholars estimate that about 250,000 enslaved Africans were brought to the United States illegally between 1808 and 1859. This resulted in the further Africanization of African American spirituality in the coastal regions of the Southeast because many of the slave ships landed in the coastal areas of the South.

== In blues music ==
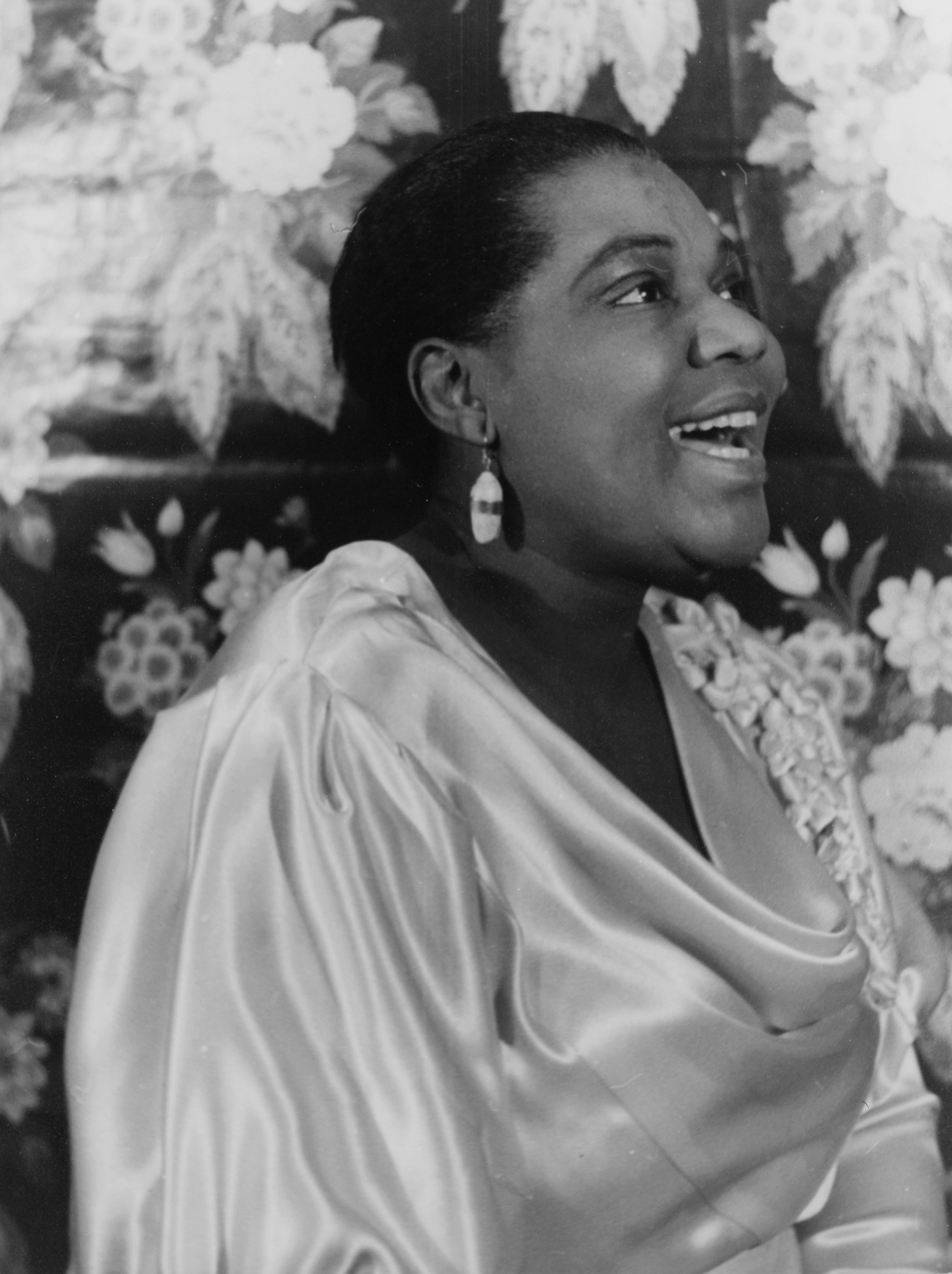
Bessie Smith wrote and performed several blues songs that reference Hoodoo.

Several African American blues singers and musicians composed songs about the culture of Hoodoo, including W.C. Handy, Bessie Smith, Robert Johnson, Big Lucky Carter, and Al Williams. The culture of Hoodoo influenced African American blues performers, who wrote songs about mojo bags, love workings, and spirits. Their songs brought awareness of Hoodoo practices to the American mainstream population.

Several blues songs describe love charms or other folk magic. In her "Louisiana Hoodoo Blues", Gertrude Ma Rainey sang about a Hoodoo work to keep a man faithful: "Take some of you hair, boil it in a pot, Take some of your clothes, tie them in a knot, Put them in a snuff can, bury them under the step...." Bessie Smith's song "Red Mountain Blues" tells of a fortune teller who recommends that a woman get some snakeroot and a High John the Conqueror root, chew them, place them in her boot and pocket to make her man love her. Several other Bessie Smith songs also mention Hoodoo. The song "Got My Mojo Working", written by Preston "Red" Foster in 1956 and popularized by Muddy Waters throughout his career, addresses a woman who can resist the power of the singer's Hoodoo amulets. Bo Diddley's song "Who Do You Love?" alludes to hoodoo, and the title is a pun on the word hoodoo.

Hoodoo practitioner Aunt Caroline Dye was born enslaved in Spartanburg, South Carolina and sold to Newport, Arkansas as a child, where she became known for soothsaying and divination with playing cards. She is mentioned by name in the Memphis Jug Band's "Aunt Caroline Dye Blues" (1930) and in Johnny Temple's song "Hoodoo Woman" (1937).

Blues singer Robert Johnson is known for his song about going "down to the crossroads" to sell his soul to the devil to become a better musician. Some authors suggest that the song invokes a Hoodoo belief in crossroads spirits, a belief that originated in Central Africa among the Kongo people. However, the devil figure in Johnson's song, a black man with a cane who haunts crossroads, closely resembles Papa Legba, a spirit associated with Louisiana Voodoo and Haitian Vodou.

== Concerns about cultural appropriation ==
African Americans created the culture of Hoodoo. There are regional styles to this tradition, and as African Americans traveled, the tradition of Hoodoo changed according to African Americans' environment. Hoodoo includes reverence to ancestral spirits, African American quilt making, animal sacrifice, herbal healing, Bakongo and Igbo burial practices, Holy Ghost shouting, praise houses, snake reverence, African American churches, spirit possession, nkisi and minkisi practices, Black Spiritual churches, Black theology, the ring shout, the Kongo cosmogram, Simbi nature spirits, graveyard conjure, the crossroads spirit, making conjure canes, incorporating animal parts, pouring of libations, Bible conjure, and conjuring in the African American tradition. By the twentieth century, white drugstore owners and mail-order companies owned by white Americans appropriated hoodoo culture and utilized fabricated images of legendary Black conjurers to make a profit. This practice became known as "marketeered" hoodoo. One such case is when white drugstore owners would put a white depiction of High John the Conqueror on their product labels, profiting off Black American spirituality while usurping the image of a Black person. As a result, many came to falsely believe that one of the most powerful conjurers was a white man. It even is still used today to sell counterfeit spells and remedies on the internet. This has become a major topic of concern for actual Hoodoo practitioners within the community because it reduced Hoodoo to just spells and tricks.

Scholars define the Hoodoo practiced by African Americans as "Old Black Belt Hoodoo." Traditional hoodoos of African American people went into hiding by the twentieth century into the present day. There is a spiritual philosophy in Hoodoo, and the tradition does have a missing theology that was taken out by the spiritual merchants who wanted to profit from an African American spiritual tradition. Charlatans used Hoodoo to make money, and changed the tradition as a form of selfish magic that is all about spells for love, money, and hexes to sell candles, oils, and trinkets. This kind of Hoodoo presented by charlatans, not from the Black community, is the hoodoo most people know. The Spiritual Church, the Sanctified church, and praise houses in Black communities are where traditional Hoodoo continues to be practiced by African Americans. One scholar traced manufactured hoodoo to the Great Migration of African Americans from the South to the North. African American folk magic changed in urban northern areas as African-Americans did not have access to fresh herbs and roots from their backyards or neighborhoods, and some bought their supplies from stores that profited from African American folk practices. White merchants profited from African American folk magic and placed stereotypical images of Indians onto hoodoo product labels to sell merchandise that appeared mystical, exotic, and powerful.

According to scholars such as Katrina Donald-Hazard and Tamara Brown, the research and understanding of African American Hoodoo should be examined from the Black American experience and not from the interpretation of marketeers and exploiters found in books and online, published by people who are not African American. White Americans have historically appropriated Black culture and claimed it as their own for profit, erasing Black presence in the process. With the advent of the internet, African American music and culture has become consumed more rapidly around the world daily. The internet resulted in the mass consumption and appropriation, and sometimes mocking of Black culture by whites and non-Black people in social media.

As one scholar wrote, "The cultural marketplace of items and ideas has handled the faith and practice of hoodoo roughly. Instead of being viewed as a legitimate religion, it is perceived as a system of magic rife with effeminate witchdoctors, pin cushioned voodoo dolls, and miscellaneous artifacts that can be bought and sold." The appropriation of hoodoo is based on ignorance about African American cultural history and hoodoo's ties to Black people.

== See also ==
- Engolo
- Knocking and kicking
- Religion of Black Americans
- Juju
- Juju Bae
