= James Martin Peebles =

American physician (1822–1922)

James Martin Peebles, Jr
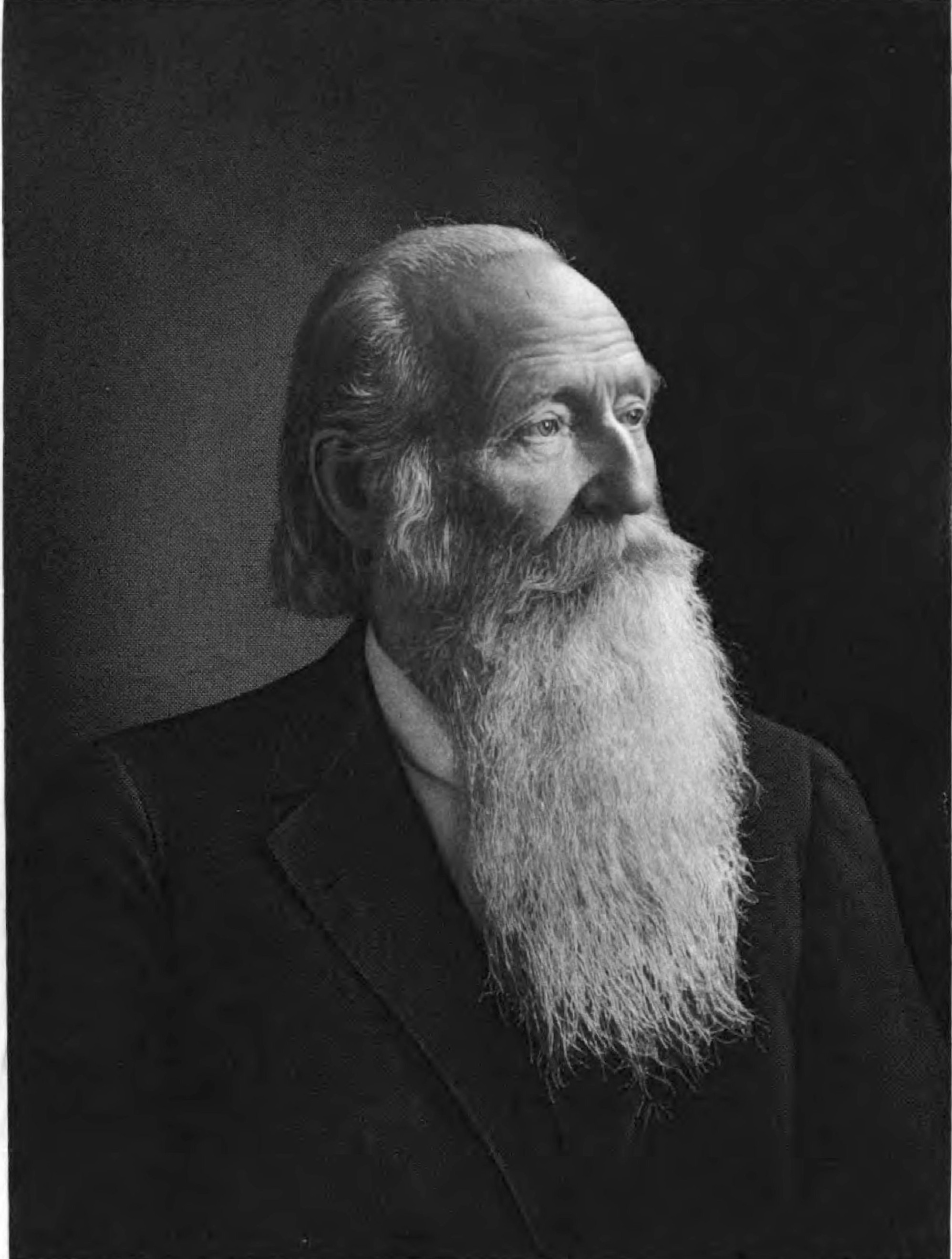
- Born: March 23, 1822; Whitingham, Vermont
- Died: February 15, 1922 (aged 99); Los Angeles, California
- Occupations: Physician (fraudulent degree & 1903 fed. conviction mail fraud for psychic healing business), writer, spiritualist preacher, self-proclaimed Christ, travelogue speaker

James Martin Peebles (March 23, 1822 – February 15, 1922) was an American physician and prolific author. He was also an organizer of many professional, medical, and psychic/spiritualist religious associations.

== Biography ==
Peebles was born in Whitingham, Vermont. Peebles was a member of the Indian Peace Commission of 1868, United States Consul at Trebizond, Turkey, and representative of the American Arbitration League at the Paris Peace Conference of 1919. A former Universalist minister, he became an Episcopalian after the American Civil War, and then a Spiritualist and Theosophist. Many of his books are on spiritualist subjects, although he also penned a quite popular book, titled How to Live a Century and Grow Old Gracefully.

Peebles obtained a diploma in 1876 from the fraudulent Philadelphia University of Medicine and Surgery. He obtained a Doctor of Philosophy from the Medical University of Chicago in 1882. He was a professor in the Eclectic Medical College of Cincinnati.

A few organizations Peebles took a leadership role in are the National Spiritualist Association, the California College of Sciences, the Peebles College of Science and Philosophy, the California Centenarian Club, and the California Humanitarian League. Peebles was an opponent of vaccination and vivisection. He authored Vaccination a Curse and a Menace to Personal Liberty in 1900. He was editor of the monthly magazine Temple of Health and Psychic Review.

Peebles was influenced by Sylvester Graham and opposed the consumption of alcohol, coffee, meat, tea and tobacco. He was a vegetarianism activist and contributed articles to The Vegetarian Magazine. His diet was ovo-lacto vegetarian, he ate butter, cheese, eggs, milk, fruits, nuts and vegetables.

Peebles was married to Mary M. Conkey, and they had three children, none of whom lived past infancy.

== Quackery ==
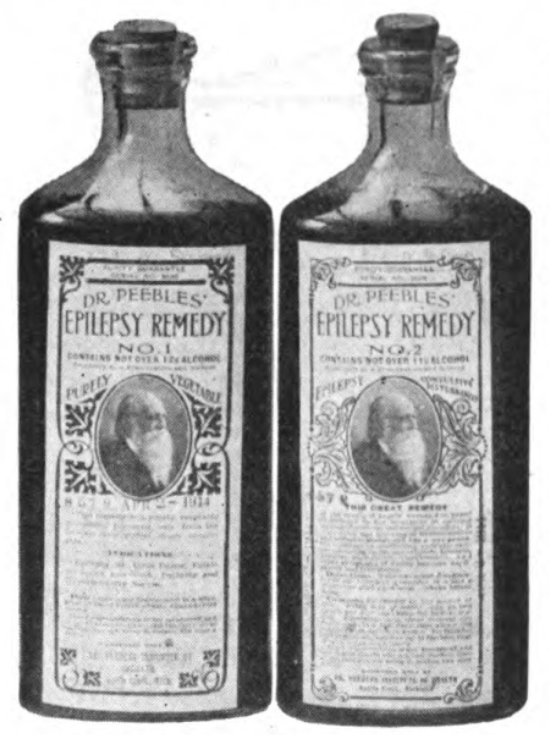
Peebles Epilepsy Remedy

He was the chairman of Peebles' Institute of Health in Battle Creek, Michigan. In reality, it was nothing more than a mail order scam business. There was no inpatient treatment center, it was a small office located above a cigar store. He advertised that if one would send in their money and symptoms, he would mail them a diagnosis and send them miracle medicine cures. His claim was that with his psychic voices and his powers equal to Christ, he did not need to see them. The institute sold a dubious "epilepsy cure", which medical experts considered quackery. His epilepsy remedy was examined by the American Medical Association's chemical laboratory which revealed it was made from "mainly a hydro-alcoholic solution of extractives with flavouring." The "indiscriminate use" of bromides was considered dangerous to epileptics. In Feb. 16, 1903, the Detroit Free Press published his conviction in the case of United States of America vs James M. Peebles et al, for illegal use of the U.S. Mail in a psychic healing business based in Battle Creek, Michigan.

Peebles also set up psychic healing institutes in California, New Jersey and Texas.

== Bibliography (partial) ==
- 1859 Henry W. Beecher on Theodore Parker's Platform: Signs of the Times, Orthodoxy and Infidelity: Spiritualism. Battle Creek, Michigan: Steam Press of the Review and Herald Office.
- with Joseph Osgood Barrett and Eben Howe Bailey, The Spiritual Harp: A Collection of Vocal Music for the Choir, Congregation, and Social Circle, Boston, New York,: W. White & company.
- 1868 The Practical of Spiritualism: Biographical Sketch of Abraham James, Historic Description of His Oil-Well Discoveries in Pleasantville, Pa., through Spirit Direction. Chicago: Horton & Leonard.
- 1869 Seers of the Ages or Spiritualism Past & Present, W. White & Co. Boston USA & J. Burns London, England
- 1871 with Hudson Tuttle, The Year-Book of Spiritualism for 1871, Boston: W. White and Company.
- 1872 Witch-Poison and the Antidote, Troy, New York: The Troy Children's Progressive Lyceum.
- 1874 with Joseph Osgood Barrett, The Gadarene, or, Spirits in Prison. Boston: Colby and Rich.
- 1875 Around the World: Or, Travels in Polynesia, China, India, Arabia, Egypt, Syria, and Other 'Heathen' Countries, Boston: Colby and Rich.
- 1876 The Conflict between Darwinianism and Spiritualism, or, Do All Tribes and Races Constitute One Human Species?: Did Man Originate from Ascidians, Apes, and Gorillas?: Are Animals Immortal? Boston: Colby & Rich
- 1877 with Ann Lee (spirit), Oriental Spiritualism: From the Spirit of Mother Ann Lee to J.M. Peebles. Mt. Lebanon, N.Y.: s.n.
- 1878 Buddhism and Christianity Face to Face, or, an Oral Discussion between the Rev. Migettuwatte, a Buddhist Priest, and Rev. D. Silva, an English Clergyman: Held at Pantura, Ceylon. Boston: Colby and Rich.
- 1878 Christ, the Corner-Stone of Spiritualism, or, the Talmudic Proofs of Jesus' Existence : Who Was Jesus?: The Distinction between Jesus and Christ: The Moral Estimate That Leading American Spiritualists Put Upon Jesus of Nazareth: The Commands, Marvels, and Spiritual Gifts of Jesus Christ: The Philosophy of Salvation through Christ : The Belief of Spiritualists and the Church of the Future. London: James Burns.
- 1880 Immortality, and Our Employments Hereafter, Boston: Colby and Rich.
- 1880 Spiritual Harmonies. 2nd. ed. Boston: Colby and Rich.
- 1884 How to Live a Century and Grow Old Gracefully. New York: M. L. Hollbrook.
- 1887 with Frederick W. Evans, J. P. MacLean, Shakerism in London : Addresses by Frederick W. Evans, Elder in the Order of Shakers, Dr. Peebles, J. Burns, and Others, at Claremont Hall, Penton St., London, N., Sunday Evening, July 3, 1887. London: Reprinted from the Medium and Daybreak.
- 1890 Nihilism, Socialism, Shakerism, Which? Mt. Lebanon, N.Y.: s.n.
- 1895 Magic: One of a Series of Lectures. San Diego, California: Peebles Publishing House.
- 1898 Celebration of the Fiftieth Anniversary of Spiritualism, at Its Birthplace. Battle Creek, Michigan: Drs. Peebles & Burroughs.
- 1898 Seers of the Ages: Embracing Spiritualism, Past and Present : Doctrines Stated and Moral Tendencies Defined. 8th ed. Boston: Banner of Light Publishing Co.

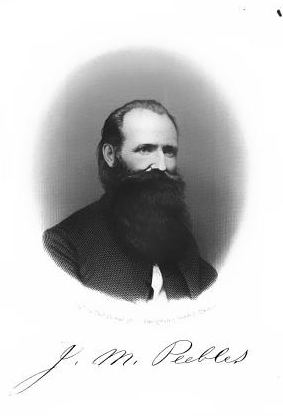
J. M. Peebles, from Spiritual Pilgrim 1872

- 1898 Three Journeys around the World, or, Travels in the Pacific Islands, New Zealand, Australia, Ceylon, India, Egypt and Other Oriental Countries. Boston: Banner of Light Publishing Co.
- 1899 Spiritualism in All Lands and Times: Address to the International Congress of Spiritualists, Held in London, June, 1898. Battle Creek, Mich.: Drs. Peebles & Burroughs.
- 1900 Priest-Rejected Proofs of Immortality: Its Naturalness, Its Possibilities, and Now-a-Day Evidences Refused a Hearing by Rev. Canon Girdlestone and Other Churchmen Connected with the Victoria Institute and Philosophical Society of Great Britain. Battle Creek, Mich.: Published by the author.
- 1902 A Series of Seven Essays Upon Spiritualism Vs. Materialism, Appearing in the Free-Thought Magazine. Battle Creek, Mich.: Dr. Peebles Institute of Health Publishing Co.
- 1902 The Eightieth Birthday Anniversary of Dr. J.M. Peebles: Celebrated in Melbourne, Australia, and Printed in Part in W.H. Terry's Harbinger of Light (April and May 1902): With an Essay on How I Am Living to Live a Century. London: Published at the office of Light.
- 1903 The First Epistle of Dr. Peebles to His Seventh Day Adventist Critics. Battle Creek, Mich.: Dr. Peebles Institute of Health.
- 1904 Reincarnation, or, the Doctrine of the "Soul's" Successive Embodiments: Examined and Discussed Pro and Con. Battle Creek, Mich.: Peebles Medical Institute.
- 1905 The Demonism of the Ages : Spirit Obsessions, So Common in Spiritism, Oriental and Occidental Occultism. 3rd ed. Battle Creek, Mich.: Peebles Medical Institute.
- 1905 Vaccination a Curse and a Menace to Personal Liberty, with Statistics Showing Its Dangers and Criminality. Battle Creek, Michigan.
- 1906 The Spirit's Pathway Traced; Did It Pre-Exist and Does It Reincarnate Again into Mortal Life? Battle Creek, Michigan,: Dr. Peebles Institute of Health.
- 1909 Spirit Mates, Their Origin and Destiny, Sex-Life, Marriage, Divorce. Battle Creek, Michigan: Peebles' Publishing Company.
- 1910 Five Journeys around the World. Battle Creek, Michigan,: Peebles Publishing Company.
- 1910 What Is Spiritualism? Who Are These Spiritualists? And What Can Spiritualism Do for the World? 5th ed. Battle Creek, Michigan: Peebles Publishing Company.
- 1912 Death Defeated, or, the Psychic Secret of How to Keep Young. 5th ed. Los Angeles: Peebles Publishing Company.
- n.d. with Henry A. Hartt, The Pro and Con of Spiritualism. Boston, Mass.: Banner of Light Publishing Company.
- 1970, Reverent William Rainen published his channeled messages from Dr. Peebles through his own publications in the 60's, 70's and later was a major contributor for a monthly magazine called, 'Spirit Speaks,' along with other famous names during that time frame. William channeled Dr. Peebles for decades, and taught many how to raise their vibration and communicate with Dr. Peebles too. Thomas Jacobson was one of his students who later became known when his journey was documented in to Dance with Angles. Others have followed since. Rev. Rainen also lectured on these same principles in the US, and abroad.
- 1990, Don Pendleton, and Linda Pendleton, To Dance with Angels : An Amazing Journey to the Heart with the Phenomenal Thomas Jacobson and the Grand Spirit, Dr. Peebles. N.Y.: Kensington Books. 5th edition, CA: Pendleton Artists (Book is written by Don and Linda Pendleton. Includes channeled material from Dr. Peebles, channeled through mediumship of Thomas Jacobson).
- 2012, Three Principles of Angelic Wisdom, The Spiritual Psychology of the Grand Spirit Dr. Peebles by Linda Pendleton. CA: Pendleton Artists. Biographical information on Dr. James Martin Peebles.
