= Amanda Cameron Flower =

Amanda Cameron Flower (sometimes Flowers) (October 15, 1863 - November 20, 1940) was a Canadian-American Spiritualist pastor and spirit medium.

Flower was a native of Owen Sound, Ontario, who came to the United States at the age of 27. She settled in Michigan, where she purchased a church building in Grand Rapids, which she proceeded to reopen as the First Church of Truth. She served as its pastor from 1904 until 1939. She began to open other Spiritualist churches across the Midwestern United States, all affiliated with the National Spiritualist Association of Churches, but she became irritated at their rules about ministers and in 1924 she founded the Independent Spiritualist Association, having in the meantime incorporated some elements of theosophy, including a belief in reincarnation, into her spirituality. She established their newsletter, editing it until 1935, and in 1931 she was elected president-for-life of the group. Her name is given inconsistently in the Association's materials, sometimes as "Flower" and sometimes as "Flowers".
