= Spiritualism in fiction =

This article provides a selected list of fictional stories in which spiritualism features as an important plot element. The list omits passing mentions.

== Written works ==
- Nathaniel Hawthorne, The Blithedale Romance (1852). Through the legend of the clairvoyant "veiled lady" (who later turns out to be real), the stagecraft and duplicity of spiritualism is contrasted with the failed Utopian ideals of the Blithedale community.
- Robert Browning, Mr Sludge, "The Medium", narrative poem, first published in Dramatis Personae (1864). Mr Sludge was based on the American medium Daniel Home.
- William Dean Howells, The Undiscovered Country, an 1880 novel on spiritualism and its dangers for the mental stability of its fanatical adherents.
- Henry James, The Bostonians (1886), whose heroine is viewed as having fallen under the spell of female trance lecturers such as Mrs. Ada T.P. Foat, modeled on the real-life Cora L. V. Scott. The novel illustrates how spiritualism was adopted by persons involved in late-19th-century reform movements.
- Bolesław Prus, Pharaoh, an 1895 historical novel incorporating scenes inspired by spiritualism.
- H. G. Wells, Love and Mr. Lewisham, a novel published in 1900, in which the main character falls in love with a girl whose stepfather claims to be a spirit medium. A large portion of the novel deals with the questionable ethics of some practitioners of the occult. (This novel marked one of the earliest departures from science fiction for Wells—and was a best-seller.)
- Hamlin Garland, Tyranny of the Dark, a 1905 novel which follows the budding romance between a skeptical man of science and a beautiful young spirit medium. (Much of the novel's material was based on the author's actual investigations.)
- Robert Hugh Benson, The Necromancers, a 1909 Catholic horror novel.
- Arthur Conan Doyle, The Land of Mist, a novel published in 1926. The third of Doyle's Professor Challenger stories, The Land of Mist deals with the conversion to spiritualism of Challenger's friend Edward Malone, his daughter Enid, and finally Challenger himself. Doyle was a committed spiritualist, and this book's presentation of spiritualist ideals is somewhat more earnest than that in most books of its type, while the descriptions of séance phenomena are substantially more pedantic.
- Agatha Christie first wrote about spiritualism in her short story The Last Seance (1926), and revisited the subject in The Sittaford Mystery (1931), Peril at End House (1932), Dumb Witness (1937) and The Pale Horse (1962).
- Dorothy L Sayers, Strong Poison (1930), in which Miss Climpson acts the part of a fake medium to obtain information from a suspect.
- George S. Kaufman, Moss Hart, You Can't Take It with You, a play which premiered on Broadway in 1936, where one of the characters, Mrs. Kirby, believes in spiritualism.
- Noël Coward, Blithe Spirit (1941), a comic play about a novelist who researches the occult and hires a medium. A séance brings back the ghost of his first wife, causing havoc for the novelist and his second wife.
- Gladys Mitchell, When I Last Died (1941), an investigation of a trio of murders that take place in a house full of poltergeists.
- H.D. Majic Ring. Written in 1943–4 as "Delia Alton", not published until 2009. Fictionalises H.D's early involvement with Lord Hugh Dowding and the "majic ring" of spiritualism.
- William Lindsay Gresham, Nightmare Alley (1946) about a carnival where the mentalist Zeena develops a "code" act, where performers memorize verbal cues that allow them to appear psychic by accurately answering written audience questions. Her pupil Stan transforms himself into Reverend Carlisle, an upstanding spiritualist preacher offering séance sessions.
- Muriel Spark, The Bachelors, a 1960 novel that follows the factions of a spiritualist group opposing and supporting a fraudulent medium.
- A. S. Byatt, Possession: A Romance. In the Victorian half of this 1990 novel, many preoccupations of the time are discussed and experienced by the characters. Spiritualism is treated as a fraud on the credulous.
- Sarah Waters, Affinity (1999): This historical novel is about a depressed young woman in turn-of-the-century England. She is depressed because she had been having a lesbian affair with a friend, who decided to cut off their relations and marry a man. In an effort to lift her depression, she volunteers at a women's prison, where she meets a beautiful young spiritualist, Selena Dawes, to whom she feels romantically attracted. The protagonist learns about spiritualism as she falls deeper in love with Selena.
- Hilary Mantel. Beyond Black (2005). The book's central character is a medium named Alison Hart who, along with her assistant/business partner/manager, Colette, takes her one-woman psychic show on the road, travelling to venues around the Home Counties, and providing her audience with a point of contact between this world and the next.
- Dianne K. Salerni. We Hear the Dead (2010). Historical novel about the Fox sisters, credited with launching spiritualism, only for one of them to admit later that it was all a delusion.
- Michelle Black, Sèance in Sepia (2011): In this mystery novel, real-life spiritualist Victoria Woodhull investigates the world of spirit photography and ends up solving a murder mystery in 1875 Chicago.

== Movies ==
- Blithe Spirit (1945 film)
- Possessed (1947 film)
- Faraon, a 1966 feature film based on Bolesław Prus' novel, Pharaoh.
- Ghost (1990 film)
- Possessed (2000 film)
- The Others, a 2001 feature film by Spanish-Chilean director Alejandro Amenábar.
- The Prestige, a 2006 feature film by Christopher Nolan based on the 1995 Christopher Priest novel.
- Hereafter (2010 film)
- Blithe Spirit (2020 film)

== Television ==
- "The Unquiet Dead," an episode of Doctor Who.
- Afterlife (2002)
- Mr Selfridge, PBS Masterpiece, season 43, episode 13 (2013): Sir Arthur Conan Doyle convinces Harry Selfridge to allow a male American spiritualist medium to hold a séance at Selfridges for the store staff.
