= Frances Conant =

Frances Conant may refer to:

- Frances Ann Conant, American spiritualist medium
- Frances Augusta Conant, American journalist, editor, and businesswoman

== See also ==
- Francis Pigott Stainsby Conant, British politician
