= Emma Hardinge Britten =

British spiritualist, editor

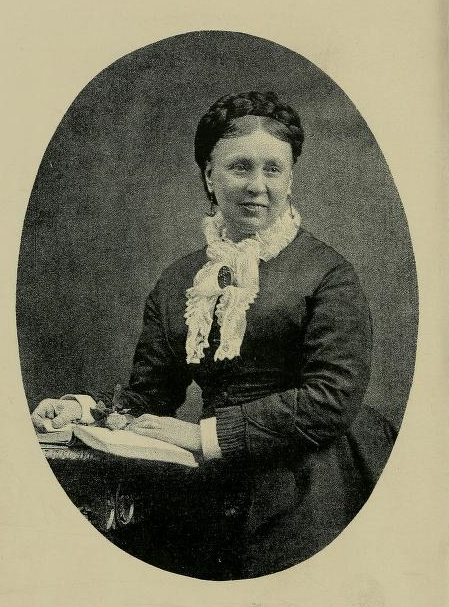
Emma Hardinge Britten

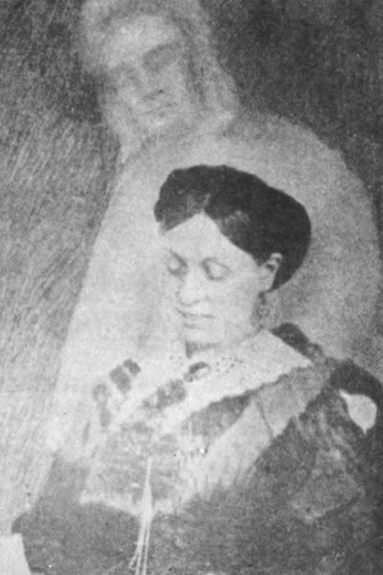
Emma Hardinge Britten taken by William H. Mumler.

Emma Hardinge Britten (2 May 1823 – 2 October 1899) was an English advocate for the early Modern Spiritualist Movement. Much of her life and work was recorded and published in her speeches and writing and an incomplete autobiography edited by her sister. She is remembered as a writer, orator, trance clairvoyant, and spirit medium. Her books, Modern American Spiritualism (1870) and Nineteenth Century Miracles (1884), are detailed accounts of spiritualism in America.

== Early years ==
Emma Floyd was born in London, England in 1823. Her father Ebenezer, who was a schoolteacher, died in 1834 when Emma was eleven years old. She grew up supporting herself and her family as a musician, trained as an opera singer and began a stage career.

== Career ==
She developed a reputation for apparent abilities as a spiritual medium during her early years. As a child, Emma had a habit of predicting the futures of people she encountered, relating to them what she had seen in visions, along with information about their deceased relatives of whom she had no prior knowledge. She also developed the amusing talent of preemptively playing songs on the piano, which her audience was thinking (to themselves!) of requesting.

According to her autobiography, Emma's clairvoyant tendencies drew her into participation with a secret London occult society which used magnetics and clairvoyant techniques for experimental purposes. During this period, she was also exposed to sexism and economic discrimination through her involvement with a manipulative member of the society whom she later termed "a baffled sensualist." Although there is little reliable information on this London occult group, it is suspected that Emma received the name Hardinge from this society, the surname she kept throughout her adult life.

She came to America and while in New York City, she attended Spiritualist séances in the hopes of writing about the gullibility of Americans. During these séances, she begin to experience events from her dramatic childhood. Under the guidance of medium Ada Hoyt, these mystical experiences at séances led her to becoming a part of the Spiritualist movement. Emma was invited by the famous Spiritualist, Horace Day, to host spiritualist séances in the Society for the Diffusion of Spiritual Knowledge. She deepened her involvement in the Spiritualist movement as a "trance lecturer" and delivered speeches across the country. Lecture topics included "The Discovering of Spirits," “The Philosophy of the Spirit Circle," “Hades," and "What Is the Basis of the Connection of the Natural and Spiritual Worlds?”

Hardinge also became involved in the campaign efforts of 1864 in support of Abraham Lincoln's re-election. After delivering a highly successful lecture titled, "The Coming Man; or the Next President of the United States," Emma was invited to continue her political work on a thirty-two lecture tour.

Perhaps the culmination of her oratorical career was a speech delivered on 14 April 1865, as a response to President Lincoln's assassination only thirty-six hours prior. Her speech was widely acclaimed by the journalists of the age as her greatest achievement. Still, not all of her spiritual lectures were so well received. In 1866, The Saturday Review wrote a satirical critique of Hardinge's speeches, describing her style as "bloated eloquence" and her content as "bunkum.”

As a chronicle of her active religious participation, Hardinge published the book Modern American Spiritualism (1870), a huge "encyclopedia" of the people and events associated with the early days of the movement. That same year, Emma married an ardent spiritualist, William Britten, from Boston. Emma continued to publish under the surname Hardinge, however, since her professional career was well-developed before this late-life marriage.

In 1872, Emma attempted to start a magazine, The Western Star, however, after a series of devastating fires in Boston, her impoverished clients dropped their subscriptions. The magazine failed after only six issues. Emma then moved back to New York, where she became involved in theosophy. She was also one of six founding members of the Theosophical Society with Helena Blavatsky until they had a falling-out.

She also edited a book called Art Magic or Mundane, Sub-Mundane and Super-Mundane Spiritism: A Treatise in Three parts and Twenty Three Sections on the subject of Theosophy. It was written anonymously and published in 1876 by 'the author' with the help of 'his [sic] highly esteemed English friend, Mrs. Emma Hardinge Britten'. There remains a strange mystery regarding its authorship. In addition, in 1887 she founded The Two Worlds, a weekly Spiritualist newspaper.

From 1878 to 1879, Emma and her husband worked as Spiritualist missionaries in Australia and New Zealand. Isaac Selby, who heard her speak in Melbourne, said, “she impressed me as the greatest woman orator that ever visited Australia.” In New Zealand she showed special interest in Māori spiritual beliefs. After returning to New York, she wrote her greatest chronicle of the spiritualist age—Nineteenth Century Miracles (1884). Emma Hardinge died in Manchester, England in 1899.

She is credited with defining the seven principles of Spiritualism which, with minor changes, are still in use today by the National Spiritualist Association of Churches in the United States and the Spiritualists' National Union in the United Kingdom.

== Publications ==
- — (1858). Outline Of A Plan For A Self-Sustaining Institution For Homeless And Outcast Females (PDF).
- — (1859). The Place and Mission of Women: An Inspirational Discourse (PDF).
- — (1861). American and Her Destiny (PDF).
- — (1861). The Wildfire Club (PDF).
- — (1864). A Funeral Oration on Rev. Thos. Starr King (PDF).
- — (1865). Address Delivered at the Winter Soirees (PDF).
- — (1865). Miss Emma Hardinge's Political Campaign, in Favour of the Union Party of America (PDF).
- — (1865). The Great Funeral Oration on Abraham Lincoln (PDF).
- — (1868). Mrs. Emma Hardinge on Spirit Mediums (PDF).
- — (1868). Rules to be Observed When Forming Spiritual Circles (PDF).
- — (1868). What is Spiritualism? (PDF).
- — (1870). Modern American Spiritualism (PDF).
- — (1870). Modern American Spiritualism.
- — (1871). On The Spirit Circle and the Laws of Mediumship (PDF).
- — (1875). The Electric Physician (PDF).
- — (1876). Ghost Land (PDF).
- — (1878). On the Road (PDF).
- — (1878). Spiritualism: Is It A Savage Superstition? (PDF).
- — (1878). The Chinese Labour Question; or the Problem of Capital versus Labor (PDF).
- — (1879). Spiritualism Vindicated and Clerical Slanders Refuted (PDF).
- — (1879). The Faith Facts and Frauds or Religious History (PDF).
- — (1883). Nineteenth Century Miracles or Spirits and Their Work in Every Country on Earth (PDF).
- — (1884). Nineteenth Century Miracles.
