= Cora Wilburn =

American novelist, essayist and poet

Cora Wilburn (1824–1906) was a 19th-century American novelist, essayist, and poet. Her work was published in Spiritualist and Jewish publications. Wilburn's 1860 novel, Cosella Wayne: Or, Will and Destiny is considered to be the first novel to depict an American Jewish coming-of-age story.

== Early life ==
Cora Wilburn was born Henrietta Pulfermacher, possibly in Alsace, France. Her mother died when Wilburn was a child. Her father, Moritz Pulfermacher, was an abusive alcoholic con-man who adopted a number of identifies. This led Wilburn, her father, and step-mother to live in a number of countries including Germany, India, Australia, and Venezuela.

Wilburn's step-mother died in 1844 and her father died in 1845. She was taken in by a family in La Guaira, Venezuela. Wilburn, who was Jewish, was pressured to convert to Catholicism. She regretted doing so and returned to Judaism eighteen months later.

== Immigration to the United States ==
In September 1848, Wilburn embarked on a three-week journey across the sea. She arrived in New York on September 30, 1848, and traveled to Philadelphia that same evening. She entered the United States under the name Cora Jackson. It is believed that her father used the Jackson surname during one of a number of attempts to hide his true identity.

Wilburn worked as a seamstress upon her arrival in Philadelphia.

== Writing career ==
Wilburn began writing in 1852. It is as this time when she began using the pen name, Cora Wilburn. This also became her legal name as demonstrated in the census and her death record.

Wilburn identified as a Spiritualist from 1852 to 1869 while also maintaining her Jewish identity. She published a series of essays in the Spiritualist newspaper, The Agitator entitled My Religion. Wilburn often wrote about social justice issues. She was outspoken against slavery, the treatment of Native Americans, and poverty, and was passionate about women's rights.

In 1860, she published a novel titled Cosella Wayne: Or, Will and Destiny. It is believed to be based on a diary she began writing while living in La Guaira, Venezuela with her father. Wilburn's novel was first published serially in the Spiritualist newspaper, Banner of Light, and is considered to be the first novel published by a Jewish American. Largely autobiographical, it explores themes of interfaith relations, spirituality, Spiritualism, Jewish practice across the world, family strife, social class, mistreatment of workers, gender roles and women's rights. It was re-published in 2019 with an introduction by Jonathan Sarna.

In 1868, Wilburn published a book of poetry titled The Spiritual Significance of Gems.

Wilburn moved to Maine at the age of 45 and embraced Reform Judaism.

She moved to Lynn, Massachusetts in 1877 where she mostly wrote poetry for Jewish publications. The Jewish Women's Congress commissioned her most famous poem, "Israel to the World in Greeting", in 1893.

== Death and legacy ==
Wilburn died in 1906 at her home in Duxbury, Massachusetts. She was cremated as per her wishes, a practice which goes against the laws of Judaism. She is believed to be the first Jew in the Boston area to have been cremated.

Wilburn was mostly forgotten until the rediscovery of her novel, Cosella Wayne: Or, Will and Destiny, around 2019. This discovery altered the accepted timeline of American Jewish literature. The novel predates Nathan Meyer's 1867 American Jewish novel, Differences, which was previously believed to be the first of its kind. Wilburn's novel also predates Emma Wolfe's 1892 Other Things Being Equal. Wolfe has previously been referred to as the first American Jewish women novelist.

In October 2022, the Commonwealth of Massachusetts renamed a bridge in Duxbury as 'Cora Wilburn Bridge' in her honor.
