= Frances Ann Conant =

American spiritual medium (1831–1875)

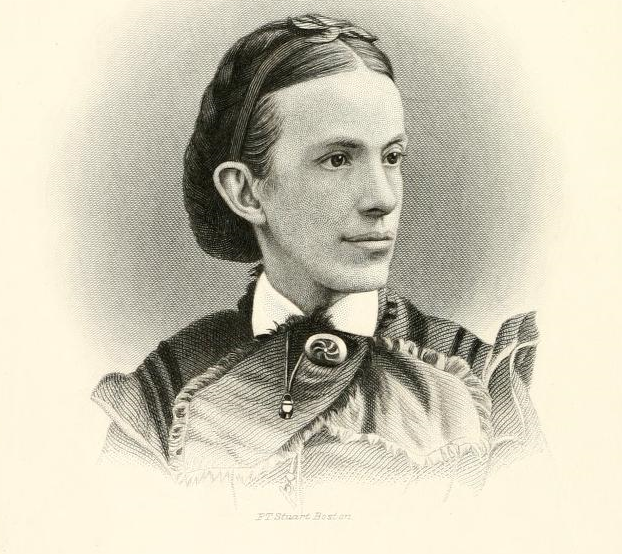
Frances Ann Conant

Frances Ann Conant (née, Crowell; April 28, 1831 – August 5, 1875), also known as J. H. Conant, was an American spiritualist medium.

Conant was born in Portsmouth, New Hampshire. Luther Colby, editor of the spiritualist newspaper the Banner of Light, gave Conant free public séances for seventeen years in Boston which were reported in the newspaper. Spiritualists claimed that Conant made contact with the spirit of a deceased Boston physician who was alleged to have made diagnoses of disease and made treatments. The Boston Courier criticized the reports, and Professor Cornelius Conway Felton claimed that Conant was known for making fanatical and wild statements.

The impresario P. T. Barnum included an exposure of Conant in his 1865 book The Humbugs of the World. He suggested that Conant had impersonated the spirits and found information about her sitters by looking at obituary notices from newspapers.
