= Joseph Osgood Barrett =

American clergyman (1823–1898)

Joseph Osgood Barrett (April 13, 1823 – February 8, 1898) was a prominent medium, spiritualist and author. He wrote mainly about religion, but also about women's rights and even botany.

Born in Bangor, Maine into a Universalist family, Barrett studied to become a Universalist minister after experiencing trances and visions. He initially kept his spiritualist experiences and beliefs to himself, but eventually "came out" to a congregation in Sycamore, Illinois, splitting the church. He was eventually expelled from the Universalist ministry by the Illinois Convention in 1869 for his unorthodox beliefs.

In the early 1860s, Barrett moved to Madison, Wisconsin, where he became a lecturer, writer, and forestry expert, as well as an editor of the Chicago-based newspaper The Spiritual Republic. His writings included allusions to spiritualism as a form of telegraphy. Barrett supported Victoria Woodhull when in 1872, as President of the American Association of Spiritualism, she espoused a doctrine of "free love", which divided the church. Barrett published a defense of feminism the following year entitled Social Freedom: Marriage as It Is, and as It Should Be.

Barrett died in Browns Valley, Minnesota and was buried in Glenbeulah, Wisconsin.
