= Jonathan Sarna =

American historian

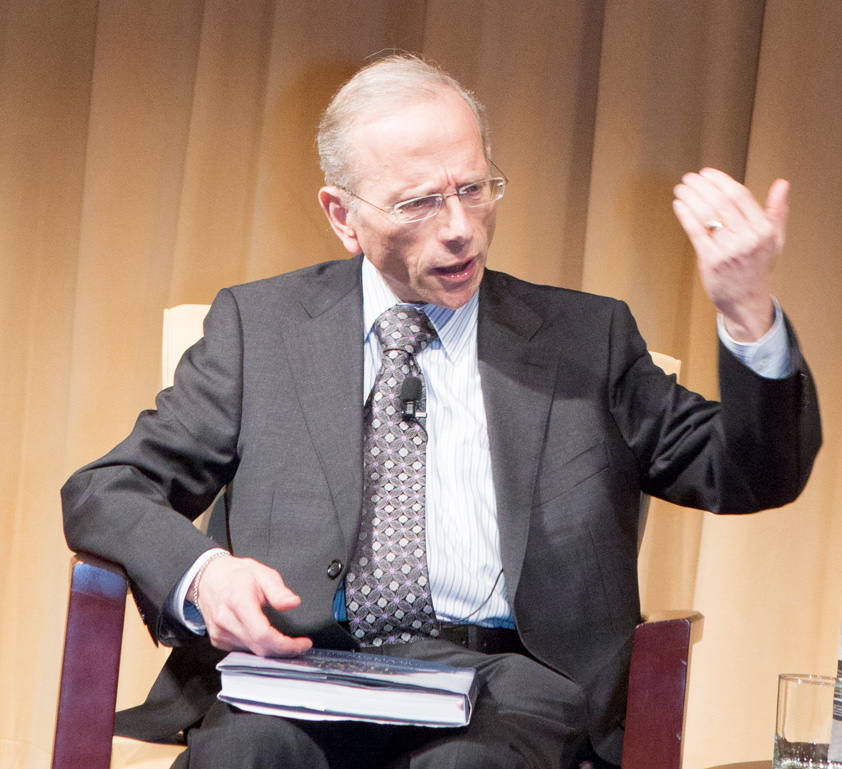
- Born: January 10, 1955 (age 71); Philadelphia, Pennsylvania, U.S.

Academic background
- Education: Brandeis University (BA)(MA); Yale University (MA)(PhD)
- Website: Brandeis Faculty Page

Jonathan D. Sarna (born 10 January 1955) is the Joseph H. and Belle R. Braun Professor of American Jewish History in the department of Near Eastern and Judaic Studies and director of the Schusterman Center for Israel Studies at Brandeis University in Waltham, Massachusetts.

== Early life and education ==
He is the son of Hebrew College librarian Helen Horowitz Sarna and biblical scholar Nahum Sarna. Born in Philadelphia and raised in New York City and Newton Centre, Massachusetts, Sarna attended Brandeis University, Hebrew College in Newton Centre, Massachusetts, Mercaz HaRav Kook in Jerusalem, Israel and Yale University in New Haven, Connecticut, where he obtained his doctorate in 1979.

== Career ==
Sarna is regarded by The Forward newspaper as one of the most prominent historians of American Judaism. His 2004 book, American Judaism: A History, received the National Jewish Book Award and appeared as Publishers Weekly's Best Religion Book.

In 2011 he was elected president of the Association for Jewish Studies and would serve in the position until 2015.

Sarna is a contributor on religion to the Newsweek–Washingtonpost.com joint project On Faith.

He is the author of Lincoln and the Jews: A History, from St. Martin's Press (2015).

He is a member of The Rohr Jewish Learning Institute's Academic Advisory Board.

One of Sarna's most widely cited academic contributions relates to his scholarship on Ulysses S. Grant's relationship with American Jews. General Ulysses S. Grant in December 1862 issued an order expelling Jewish traders from his military command; it was a blatant display of anti-Semitism and President Abraham Lincoln forced Grant to rescind it. In his book When General Grant Expelled the Jews (2012), Sarna argues that Grant later became one of the greatest friends of Jews in American history. When he was president, he appointed more Jews than any previous president and he condemned atrocities against Jews in Russia, putting human rights on the American diplomatic agenda.

Sarna rediscovered Cora Wilburn, a celebrated 19th century poet and author of the first American Jewish novel, whose work had been forgotten.

== Honors and awards ==
Sarna received the Association for the Social Scientific Study of Jewry's Marshall Sklare Award in 2002.

He is the author or editor of more than thirty books on American Jewish history and life. His American Judaism: A History, recently published in a second edition, won six awards including the 2004 Everett Jewish Book of the Year Award from the Jewish Book Council.

== Personal life ==
Sarna is married to Boston College theology professor Ruth Langer, with two children, Aaron and Leah. His daughter, Rabbanit Leah Sarna, is the spiritual leader of Shaarei Orah congregation outside of Philadelphia.
