= Morris Pratt Institute =

Spiritualist educational institution in Wauwatosa, Wisconsin, United States

Location
- 11811 Watertown Plank Road; Wauwatosa, Wisconsin; United States
- Coordinates: 43°02′42.5″N 88°03′36.5″W

Information
- Former name: Temple of Science (1889–1901)
- Type: Private, online
- Religious affiliation: Spiritualism
- Denomination: National Spiritualist Association of Churches
- Established: 1889 (as the Temple of Science); 1901 (as the Morris Pratt Institute)
- Founder: Morris Pratt
- Website: morrispratt.org

The Morris Pratt Institute is a private corporation for "spiritualist study" in Wauwatosa, Wisconsin, United States.

The institution opened in 1889 as the "Temple of Science" in Whitewater, Wisconsin, and was later incorporated under its present name in 1901. At the time of its establishment, it was the first school dedicated to the teaching of Spiritualism, and as of 2025, it remains the only such institution in the world. Since at least the 1960s, it has been affiliated with the National Spiritualist Association of Churches.

Presently, the institution operates as an online school and offers two-year programs for training Spiritualist mediums and ministers. Its building in Wauwatosa is used as an office and Spiritualist library and museum. In Whitewater, the school is associated with various urban legends that link it to supernatural activity in the community.

== History ==
=== Background ===
Morris Pratt was born in Eaton, New York, in 1820. In 1840, Pratt and his family moved to Wisconsin. Once there, he established a successful farm and became involved in Spiritualism circles in southern Wisconsin, particularly in Lake Mills, Wisconsin. Spiritualism was a religious movement that had begun in upstate New York in the 1840s, with a key tenet being the belief that people could communicate with the spirits of dead people. Pratt was a believer of Spiritualism and would be a practitioner throughout his life, with several sources stating that he identified his spirit guide as a Native American man. In the 1880s, he began to interact with Mary Hayes Chynoweth, a well-known medium in the state. Hayes Chynoweth, claiming to channel the spirit of a dead German professor, gave Pratt advice on land investments in northern Wisconsin. Around 1883, Hayes-Chynoweth organized an investment group that included her two sons and Pratt and invested in mining operations around Hurley, Wisconsin, and Ironwood, Michigan. The land proved to have large iron reserves, causing Pratt to become wealthy.

=== Creation ===
Pratt had previously vowed that if, he became wealthy, he would invest in the propagation of Spiritualist teachings, and to this end, he began construction on a Spiritualist school. The school, located at the intersection of Center Street and Third Street in Whitewater, Wisconsin, would be the first school dedicated to Spiritualist teaching in the world. The institute consisted of a three-story brick building featuring lecture halls, dormitories, and classrooms, as well as more specialized rooms for Spritiualist practices. For instance, the building featured a large room painted completely white where groups could hold séances. Pratt called the institution the "Sanitarium and Hall of Psychic Science", later renaming it the "Temple of Science". Meanwhile, more critical members of the community called it "Pratt's Folly". The building was completed in 1888, with the dedication ceremony that year attended by notable Spiritualists from Canada and the United States. The school opened the following year.

In 1901, Pratt decided to refocus the institute, gearing it towards a more academic nature by offering classes in both general education and Spiritualism. It was officially incorporated as the Morris Pratt Institute on December 11, 1901. On September 30, 1902, the school accepted its first class of about 20 students. In December 1902, before the end of this first semester, Pratt died, with his funeral held at the building. However, the school continued to operate successfully through the 1920s. Attendance peaked between 1910 and 1915, with the student body numbering up to 45 during this period. At some point in the early 20th century, prominent criminal lawyer Clarence Darrow visited the college. During the Great Depression, the school suffered from both the economic downturn as well as a broader disinterest in Spiritualism. During this time, the school opened and closed intermittently, including a closure in the spring of 1932. Classes resumed three years later, after sufficient funds were raised. However, the school's last semester was held in May 1939. Following this, the building was used as a retirement home for Spiritualists. However, starting in 1948, it was used as a dormitory for the Whitewater Teachers College. In 1961, the building was demolished.

=== Relocation to Wauwatosa ===
The current building for the school in Wauwatosa, Wisconsin, was purchased and renovated by the institute in 1946. It is located at the intersection of West 118th Street and Watertown Plank Road, with an address of 11811 Watertown Plank Road. In 1963, author William J. Whalen wrote that the institute was operated by the National Spiritualist Association of Churches—the largest Spiritualist group in the world—and offered a two-year program for training mediums and ministers. Around that same time, the institute's building and property was owned by a trusteeship of seven Spiritualists. Since 2023, the school has operated as an online school, but it maintains its property in Wauwatosa. It is open to the public and contains both a Spiritualism research library and a gift shop. Per an official of the institute, it operates primarily as a museum. As of 2025, the institution is the only school with ties to Spiritualism.

== Organization and academics ==
At the time of its incorporation, classes were grouped into two categories. The first category consisted of general education courses, such as grammar, history, and mathematics, while the second consisted of Spiritualist-oriented courses, such as mediumship and psychic research. The school was coeducational and its general education courses were available to all members of the Whitewater community. According to a member of the Whitewater Historical Society, the institute functioned similarly to a junior college. Currently, the Wauwatosa location contains a large library with materials relating to Spiritualism. As of 2025, the institute, through its online programs, offers three courses: One in psychic healing, one in mediumship, and one that combines these two paths.

== Urban legends ==
Around the time of its inception, residents of Whitewater referred to the institute as the "Spooks Temple". Rumors in the community abounded that it was a school for witchcraft. According to Carol Cartwright, the president of the Whitewater Histrical Society, these early rumors about the institute can be attributed in part to the community opposition to Spiritualism's strong progressive culture, as many women held high offices in Spiritualism at a time when women were largely barred from holding ministerial positions in other religions. Additionally, Pratt's confrontational nature, which included public ridicules of other religions and offers to debate church leaders, did not endear him to the community.

According to Cartwright, several urban legends about the building emerged during the time when it was used as a dormitory for the Whitewater Teachers College, linking it to other stories of supernatural activity in the city. By the 1970s, supernatural stories were being regularly reported in the college's student newspaper. As a result of the stories, which include those connected to the Morris Pratt Institute, Whitewater is sometimes nicknamed the "Second Salem". In 2021, the Wauwatosa building was listed as among the five most haunted places in Wisconsin by Milwaukee Magazine.

== Sources ==
- Atterberry, Tara E., ed. (2017). Encyclopedia of Associations: An Associations Unlimited Reference. Part 2. Vol. 1 (56th ed.). Farmington Hills, Michigan: Gale. ISBN 978-1-4144-8824-0. OCLC 976437311.
- Blunsdon, Norman (1963) [1962]. A Popular Dictionary of Spiritualism (1st American ed.). New York City: The Citadel Press. OCLC 218004.
- Buckland, Raymond (2006). "Pratt, Morris". The Spirit Book: The Encyclopedia of Clairvoyance, Channeling, and Spirit Communication. Canton, Michigan: Visible Ink Press. pp. 316–317. ISBN 978-0-7808-0922-2. OCLC 62213431.
- Holmes, Fred L. (1939). "Prospecting with the Spirits: Morris Pratt". Badger Saints and Sinners. Foreword by Hamlin Garland; Drawings by Ozzie Johnson. Milwaukee: E. M. Hale & Company. pp. 365–378. OCLC 2631811.
- Janik, Erika (December 11, 2017). "World's First Spiritualist School Founded in Wisconsin". Wisconsin Public Radio. Archived from the original on July 14, 2024.
- Krulos, Tea (October 20, 2025). "Second Salem: The Haunted History of Whitewater's Spiritualist Past". Milwaukee Magazine. ISSN 0741-1243. OCLC 10102193. Archived from the original on December 14, 2025.
- Lardinois, Anna (October 28, 2021). "Where to Find Wisconsin's Most Haunted Places". Milwaukee Magazine. ISSN 0741-1243. OCLC 10102193. Archived from the original on October 28, 2021.
- Powell, Teran (December 20, 2024). "The Morris Pratt Institute has been a source of Spiritualist education for more than a century". Bubbler Talk. WUWM. Archived from the original on December 22, 2024.
- Powers, Joy; Thomas, Graham (September 30, 2025). "The Morris Pratt Institute is Wisconsin's historic hub for speaking to the dead". Lake Effect. WUWM. Archived from the original on October 2, 2025.
- Whalen, William J. (1963). "Spiritualism". Faiths for the Few: A Study of Minority Religions. Milwaukee: Bruce Publishing Company. pp. 42–47. OCLC 510733.
