= Banner of Light =

American spiritualist journal

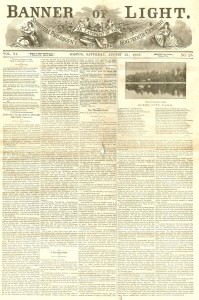
- Banner of Light 12 August 1897
- Categories: Spiritualism
- Frequency: Weekly
- Publisher: L. Colby & Company
- First issue: 11 April 1857
- Final issue: January 1907
- Country: United States
- Language: English
- OCLC: 18300260

The Banner of Light was an American spiritualist journal published weekly in newspaper format between 1857 and 1907, the longest lasting and most influential of such journals. It was based in Boston, but covered the movement across the US. The paper included a page that gave messages received by its resident medium, and letters from relatives confirming the authenticity of the messages. It also included articles on spiritualism, book reviews, transcripts of lectures delivered by prominent spiritualists, notices of meetings and letters from readers.

== History ==
The Banner of Light succeeded The Life, a local newsletter that William Berry had started the year before to publicize the seances of Mrs. Jennie H. ("Fanny") Conant. It had an eight-page newspaper format, with forty columns, each almost 150 lines long. It was published weekly, with the first issue appearing on 11 April 1857.

The Banner of Light was based in Boston apart from a brief period in 1859 when it was published in New York. In 1866 the Banner established a Western Department in Cincinnati to cover the Midwest, although its reports of activity far from Boston was by no means complete. The publisher was Isaac Rich and Luther Colby, and then L. Colby & Company. Subscriptions at first cost $2.00 per year, later $3.00 per year. Editors were Luther Colby (1857–94), John W. Day (18–97), Harrison D. Barrett (1897–1904), J.J. Morse (1904–05) and Irving F. Symonds (1905–07).

There were many spiritualist journals in the second half of the 19th century, but the Banner of Light was much more widely read than any of the others, with a truly national circulation. However, claims by the Banner of Light to have from 15,000 to 30,000 subscribers were greatly exaggerated. The journal was always financially precarious. The Progressive Thinker of Chicago had overtaken it in number of subscribers by the early 1890s. The last weekly issue in newspaper format was volume 99, number 26, dated 18 August 1906. This issue held an announcement that the journal would now appear monthly, and called for subscriptions. Volume 100, number 1, appeared as a 54-page monthly in January 1907, and proved to be the last issue.

Among the more notable serialized books that The Banner published was Cora Wilburn's pioneering Jewish feminist novel, Cosella Wayne (1860).

== Contents ==
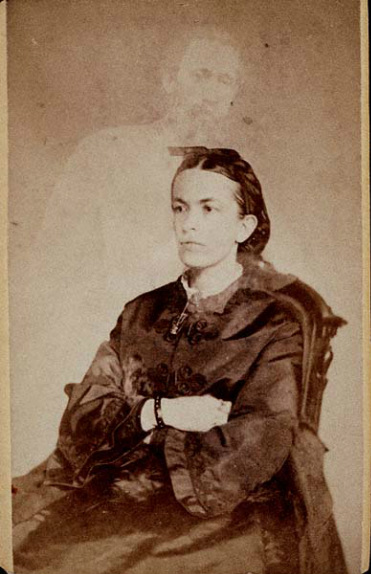
Mrs. Conant of Banner of Light. Her Brother, Charles H. Crowell. The ghostly image of the medium's brother appears behind her in this Albumen print carte de visite.

The Banner of Light began as a general literary magazine with some mentions of spiritualism and a page titled The Messenger covering Mrs. Conant's seances. The first issue proclaimed that it had, "FORTY COLUMNS OF ATTRACTIVE READING, comprising Capital Original Stories; Off-hand Sketches of Life; Historical Pictures; thrilling Adventures; Home Circle; Ladies' and Children's Department; Agricultural Facts, Mechanical Inventions, Art, Science, Wit, Wisdom, the Beauties of Poetry, and a General Summary of Political and Social News." In the third issue the publishers said that due to readers' response the journal would place greater emphasis on spiritualism, with at least two pages covering the movement. From then the Banner of Light was "An Exponent of the Spiritual Philosophy of the Nineteenth Century."

Banner of Light held free seances in its spirit room three times per week. It advertised:

They are conducted through the mediumship of Mrs. Fanny Conant, a lady who for several years past has been influenced by spirits of every rank, grade of life, and development of mind. These invisible guests throng the circle room which the editors of the Banner of Light, with noble and exemplary generosity, open free to the public. And there, as opportunity permits, they pour forth, through the entranced organism of Mrs. Conant, the tale of their earthly lives, their vices and errors, their bitter lamentation for earthly lives misspent, messages of love and consolation to absent friends, warnings, encouragement, and every description of characteristic communication that could be conceived of as emanating from the heterogeneous conditions of human existence. And all this is represented in the voice, tone, gestures, and even the countenance of this wonderful medium, with such graphic fidelity that a witness with closed eyes might readily persuade himself, he was in the actual presence of all the various characters thus delineated. The accuracy of these remarkable spirit personations is further attested by hundreds of letters addressed to the Banner of Light by total strangers, who have read and recognized the printed messages from their spirit friends.

The short messages "from the departed to their friends in earth-life" received in these seances were published in The Messenger, later The Message Page, of each issue. The Message Department was "a page of Spirit-Messages from the departed to their friends in earth-life, given through the mediumship of Mrs. J. H. Conant, providing direct spirit-intercourse between the Mundane and Super-Mundane Worlds." Fanny Conant was the regular medium for the first eighteen years, then Jennie S. Rudd for three years and Mary Theresa Longley for 14 years. The Banner published letters from readers who recognized that communicating spirit was authentic. It did not discuss messages that were not authenticated. The feature was highly successful and was copied by other spiritualist journals.

The Banner of Light provides a valuable resource for understanding the history of the spiritualist movement in the US, and counted among its employees or contributors all the main members of this movement. The journal published the sermons of Henry Ward Beecher and other well-known ministers, and essays on spiritualism and reform. There were lengthy book reviews. The journal advertised lectures and debates and had a column that tracked the movements of lecturers and mediums. There were news items on development of spiritualism around the country, and many letters discussing controversies in the movement. The journal avoided criticism of even the most obviously fraudulent mediums, and also failed to oppose the "free love" or radical spiritualists. The journal also serialized "original novelettes of reformatory tendencies," often running several at the same time.

Historian Drew Gilpin Faust searched in the database of the National Park Services, which contains the records of 6.3 million soldiers, three names of supposed dead soldiers that appear in the pages of Banner of Light: Caleb Wilkins of Indiana, Gilbert Thompson of Alabama and Leander Bolton of Pennsylvania. None of those names match any names in that database.

== Sources ==
- Demarest, Marc (2014). "The Banner of Light". IAPSOP.
- Hardinge, Emma (1879). Modern American Spiritualism.
- Nartonis, David K. (June 1, 2010). "The Rise of 19th-Century American Spiritualism, 1854–1873". Journal for the Scientific Study of Religion. 49 (2): 361–373. doi:10.1111/j.1468-5906.2010.01515.x.
- "The Mumler Mystery". The American Photography Museum.
