= Cora L. V. Scott =

American spiritualist and writer (1840–1923)

Cora Richmond (Cora L. V. Scott)
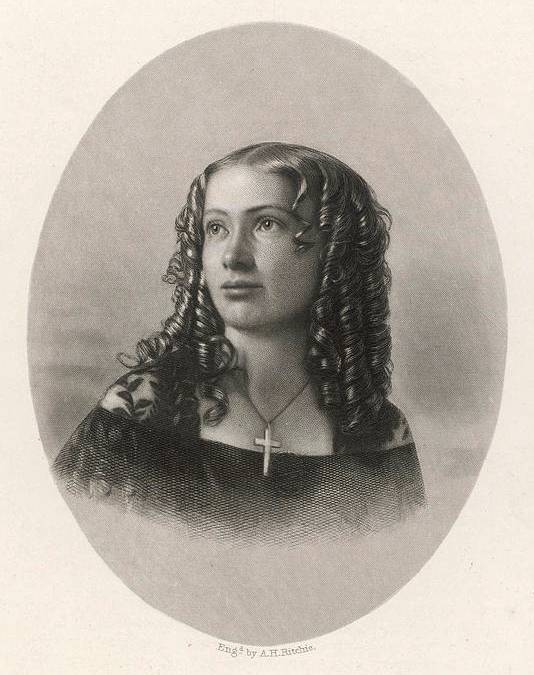
- Circa 1857
- Born: Cora Lodencia Veronica Scott; April 21, 1840; Cuba, New York
- Died: January 3, 1923 (aged 82); Chicago, Illinois
- Occupations: Author, lecturer, spiritualist medium, co-founder of National Spiritualist Association of Churches

Cora Lodencia Veronica Scott (April 21, 1840 – January 3, 1923) was one of the best-known mediums of the Spiritualism movement of the last half of the 19th century. Most of her work was done as a trance lecturer, though she also wrote some books whose composition was attributed to spirit guides rather than her own personality. Married four times, Cora adopted the last name of her husband at each marriage, and at various times carried the surnames Hatch, Daniels, Tappan, and Richmond.

== Biography ==
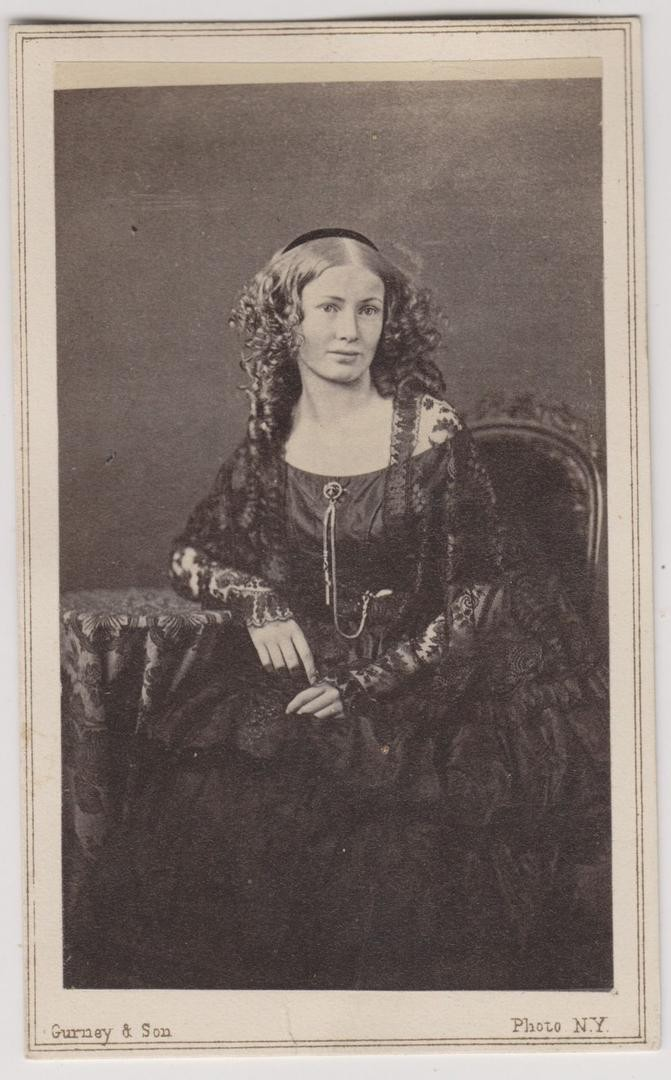
Undated photograph of Scott

Cora Scott was born on April 21, 1840, near Cuba, New York. At her birth she had a caul over her face, an intact amniotic sac which is thought in some folk religions to indicate special powers. Her parents, though initially Presbyterian, became interested in the Universalist religion, and in early 1851 joined the Hopedale Community, an intentional community in Hopedale, Massachusetts. Led by Adin Ballou, the community was committed to abolitionism, temperance, socialism, and nonviolence. Finding Hopedale too crowded, the Scott family moved to Waterloo, Wisconsin later that year to found a similar intentional community, with the blessings of Adin Ballou. It was there, in early 1852, that Cora first exhibited her ability to fall into a trance and write messages and speak in ways very unlike herself. Her parents soon began to exhibit her to the surrounding country, and in this way she became a part of the network of trance lecturers that characterized the Spiritualist movement.

Cora's father died in 1853, and in 1854 she moved to Buffalo, New York and became well known among the most important Spiritualists in the country. By the age of 15, she was making public appearances in which she spoke with "supernatural eloquence" on almost any topic put forward by the audience, all while claiming to be in a trance. Contemporary audiences found the spectacle itself incredible: a very young and pretty girl declaiming with authority on esoteric subjects; it was enough to convince many people that she was indeed a channel for spirits.

Her first husband, whom she married at age 16, was the professional mesmerist Benjamin Franklin Hatch. Over 30 years her senior, Hatch was a skilled showman who managed Cora in order to maximize revenue, much to the dismay of serious spiritualists. The marriage ended bitterly, but since the period of their marriage coincided with her greatest fame, Cora is best known as Cora Hatch. A British traveller, John A. Nicholls, who saw her speak in 1857 wrote, "commenced a flow of such rubbish as I think I never heard before; not one single idea, but, no doubt, a great command of mere words. I thought of Dickens's description of a woman commencing an address to Martin Chuzzlewit, 'Howls the sublime.' She talked about eternal melodies, and harmonies, and vibrations, and astronomy, geology, botany, painting, sculpture, everything."

In 1865 she married Nathan W. Daniels.

On May 10, 1874, Cora L. V. Tappan delivered an inspirational discourse at Cleveland Hall, London. The next week Judge John W. Edmonds delivered an address to a large audience in Cleveland Hall through Mrs. Tappan as medium. The judge had died less than two months earlier. Charles Maurice Davies wrote that year,

The reigning favourite at present in London is Mrs. Cora Tappan, who was better known as a medium in America by her maiden name of Cora Hatch. She came out with considerable éclat at St. George's Hall, after which she drifted to Weston's Music Hall in Holborn, in which slightly incongruous locality she set up her "Spiritual Church". Now she has abandoned the ecclesiastical title, and hangs out at Cleveland Hall, somewhere down a slum by Fitzroy Square. Facilis descensus!

She returned to the United States in 1875, and became pastor of a Spiritualist church in Chicago. She would hold this position for the rest of her life. In 1878 she married William Richmond, who helped her by learning shorthand so he could record her lectures for publication.

In 1893 she delivered a presentation on Spiritualism at the Parliament of the World's Religions in Chicago. That year she helped found the National Spiritualist Association, and was elected its first vice-president. For the next twenty years she spoke at the Association's annual conference.

Cora Scott Richmond died at the age of 82 on January 3, 1923, in Chicago, Illinois.

== Beliefs ==
Cora was a denier of evolution. In a number of lectures she dismissed evolution:

In fact, the weak points in the Darwinian theory are easily found out by the student of science or natural philosophy. One is, that he makes the doctrine of the theory of selection and evolution account for the existence of distinctive types. In our opinion this is most erroneous; there is no such progress going on in nature; there has never been known to be such a process in nature as the one type of existence ever becoming merged into or becoming another type. There is no change going on in the lower orders that are said to resemble man by which it is possible that they become future men. The gorilla and the ape, though resembling man in appearance, fail to resemble in any distinctive qualities of expressed intelligence, and there has never been known in the history of the world a specific change from the lower to the higher degree of existence. Besides, that which is said to be the organic and continuous property of evolution applies not to the change and transition from one type to another of existence, but to the perfection and development of the type already formed; so that if nature does select her types, it does not and has not been shown that she has ever confused those types, interblent them, or in anyway lost them, but persistently, sacredly preserved the germs of every specific type in existence up to the present time.

Cora instead supported a pantheistic type of spiritualism:

But, as we stated, if we are to trace man's origin we must consider him in his complete nature, and not merely in his physical nature. It is sufficiently easy – a process of the highest facility – to trace, with the scientific data that are in the world, the results of natural law up to the development of man – the monad, or distinctive particle which exists by itself; the duad, which means two monads added together, makes another stage, etc., etc. These atoms in their sixfold nature, constantly changing and developing, are fully and absolutely empowered by the law of existence to develop all phases of physical life that are known. But atoms are not intelligent; the monads, duads, triads, are not intelligent; molecules are not intelligent. No atom contains or atomic structure contains within itself that which is the final source and cause of organisation; and when the physical scientist declares that he has discovered the process of creation, he omits the one power of creation that alone is capable of solving the mystery.

== Publications ==
- The Soul: Its Nature, Relations, and Expressions in Human Embodiments (1887)
- Psychosophy (1890, 1915)
- Abraham Lincoln (1910)
- My Experiences While Out Of My Body (1915)
