= National Spiritualist Association of Churches =

Spiritualist church organization

- Abbreviation: NSAC
- Formation: September 27, 1893; 133 years ago
- Founder: W.H. Bach, H.D. Barrett, L.V. Moulton, J.M. Peebles, C.L.V. Scott
- Purpose: Religious
- Headquarters: Lily Dale, New York
- Website: nsac.org
- Formerly called: National Spiritualist Association (NSA)

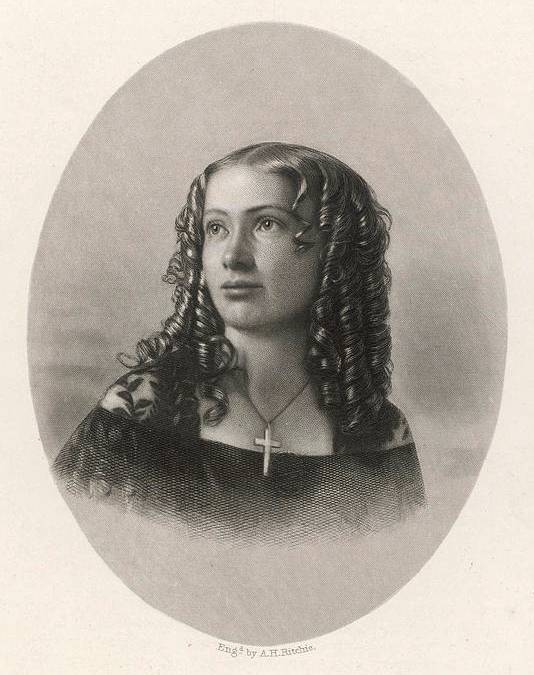
Cora L.V. Scott, circa 1857

The National Spiritualist Association of Churches (NSAC) is one of the oldest and largest of the national Spiritualist church organizations in the United States. The NSAC was formed as the National Spiritualist Association of the United States of America (NSA) in September 1893, during a three-day convention in Chicago, Illinois. Although American Spiritualists had previously tended to resist institutional or denominational organization, early NSA leaders hoped organization would help promote the truths of the religion both spiritually and practically. Organization could help non-Spiritualists distinguish genuine mediumship from the rapidly proliferating varieties of fraudulent mediumship, increase communication among Spiritualists, prevent the legal prosecution of spirit mediums under fortune telling and medical licensing laws, and counterattacks by "orthodox" ministers in the press. To these reasons, early leaders added the material support of spirit mediums and healers, just as other religious groups provided for the support of their clergy.

Among the NSA's first leaders were W. H. Bach, Harrison D. Barrett (former Unitarian clergymen), Luther V. Moulton, James Martin Peebles, and Cora L. V. Scott (spiritualist medium). The association is also important for its adoption of a number of statements on spiritualism which have become a standard to which other Spiritualist bodies more or less adhere.

== Declaration of Principles ==
In 1899, a six-article "Declaration of Principles" was adopted by many Spiritualist groups.. Three other articles were added at a later date. By no means do all Spiritualist denominations or individual churches affirm these principles, but because of their historical significance in setting the beliefs of modern Spiritualism, all nine articles are quoted in full below. The influence of Unitarianism is obvious in the definition of God in principle one.

1. We believe in Infinite Intelligence;
2. We believe that the phenomena of Nature, both physical and spiritual, are the expression of Infinite Intelligence;
3. We affirm that a correct understanding of such expression and living in accordance therewith constitute true religion;
4. We affirm that the existence and personal identity of the individual continue after the change called death;
5. We affirm that communication with the so-called dead is a fact, scientifically proven by the phenomena of Spiritualism;
6. We believe that the highest morality is contained in the Golden Rule: "Do unto others as you would have them do unto you." (Principles 1–6 adopted in Chicago, Illinois, 1899. Principle 6 revised in Ronkonkorma, New York, 2004.)
7. We affirm the moral responsibility of the individual, and that we make our own happiness or unhappiness as we obey or disobey Nature's physical and spiritual laws;
8. We affirm that the doorway to reformation is never closed against any soul here or hereafter; (Principles 7–8 adopted in Rochester, New York, 1909 and revised in Rochester, New York, 2001.
9. We affirm that the precept of Prophecy and Healing are Divine attributes proven through Mediumship. (Principle 9 adopted in St. Louis, Missouri, 1944, revised in Oklahoma City, 1983 and in Westfield, New Jersey, 1998.

=== Definitions ===
Over the years, other statements have been adopted on "What Spiritualism Is and Does" and "Spiritual Healing." A set of "Definitions" has also been approved. The two issues of "reincarnation" and the relation of Spiritualism to Christianity have been the major questions dividing Spiritualists. Differing answers to these two questions have split the NSAC on several occasions, and dissent led independent Spiritualists to form their own organizations instead of joining the NSAC. These were adopted in October 1914, 1919, 1930, 1950 during the organization's annual convention.

- Spiritualism is the Science, Philosophy and Religion of continuous life, based upon the demonstrated fact of communication, by means of mediumship, with those who live in the Spirit World. (1919)
- Spiritualism Is a Science Because it investigates, analyzes and classifies facts and manifestations demonstrated from the spirit side of life.
- Spiritualism Is a Philosophy because it studies the Laws of Nature both on the seen and unseen sides of life and bases its conclusions upon present observed facts. It accepts statements of observed facts of past ages and conclusions drawn therefrom, when sustained by reason and by results of observed facts of the present day.
- Spiritualism Is a Religion because it strives to understand and to comply with the Physical, Mental and Spiritual Laws of Nature, which are the laws of God.
- A Spiritualist is one who believes, as the basis of his or her religion, in the communication between this and the Spirit World by means of mediumship and who endeavors to mould his or her character and conduct in accordance with the highest teachings derived from such communication. (1914, Rev. 1938)
- A Medium is one whose organism is sensitive to vibrations from the spirit world and through whose instrumentality, intelligences in that world are able to convey messages and produce the phenomena of Spiritualism. (1914)
- A Spiritualist Healer is one who, either through one's own inherent powers or through mediumship, is able to impart vital, curative force to pathologic conditions. (1930, 1993)
- The Phenomena of Spiritualism consists of Prophecy, Clairvoyance, Clairaudience, Gift of Tongues, Laying on of Hands, Healing, Visions, Trance, Apports, Levitation, Raps, Automatic and Independent Writings and Paintings, Voice, Materialization, Photography, Psychometry and any other manifestation proving the continuity of life as demonstrated through the Physical and Spiritual senses and faculties of man. (1950)

==== Reincarnation ====
Reincarnation is the belief that spirits or souls are caught in a cycle of death and rebirth, being born into new bodies in each new life until they are freed from this cycle by some means. Reincarnation has been a disputed doctrine within the American Spiritualist movement from its very early years, although debate around it increased significantly with the publication of spiritist Allan Kardec's The Spirits Book and with the rise of Theosophy in the late 1800s.

Spiritualists have given multiple reasons for opposing or promoting the idea of reincarnation. Some have argued that the soul's ability to progress to higher states rests both in its immortality and its ability to gain experience and knowledge across multiple lives. "The experience of life is the food on which the soul grows," wrote Theosophist L. W. Rogers in 1917.. Others pointed to the curious phenomena of young children recounting experiences from past-lives, or the appearance of birthmarks or other unusual features that correspond with marks or injuries on their alleged previous bodies.

Some early Spiritualist thinkers, such as Andrew Jackson Davis, opposed reincarnation because they saw it as inconsistent with natural law. To Davis, natural law keeps the world in an active state of continual refinement and progression toward higher and more complex forms. He argued that each immortal soul has one individual identity that it creates in its time on earth and keeps as it progresses through the afterlife. This soul is also subject to natural law, which actively prompts its development toward higher spiritual states. Reincarnation, in this light, is inconsistent with natural law, because it would allow regression to a previous state (a life on earth) and it would force the soul to create additional identities, which it is not able to accommodate.

Other Spiritualists, while more open to the possibility of reincarnation, have simply objected to the teaching of reincarnation until it is able to be confirmed by scientific means. This latter argument was cited when delegates to the 1930 NSAC convention voted in a resolution that banned the teaching or promotion of the principle of reincarnation by NSAC members. The resolution did not settle the issue once and for all, but the official stance of the organization since at least 1996 has been less restrictive.It states that the "theory of reincarnation has not yet been satisfactorily proven, nor has it been satisfactorily disproven." This means that chartered auxilaries are free to teach and discuss reincarnation and individual Spiritualists are free to make up their own mind on the subject. So, the validity of reincarnation is not maintained as fact from the podium, but it can be addressed in unofficial gatherings.

==== Christianity ====
"Are Spiritualists also Christians?" was debated by the NSAC and generally decided in the negative. While the NSAC has drawn heavily on the Christian faith, from which most members came, it identifies its members as Spiritualists. The specifically "Christian Spiritualists" were found in other bodies such as the Progressive Spiritualist Church and the Spiritual Church Movement. Some Spiritualists differentiate between primitive Christianity, which they believe themselves to be following and practicing, and contemporary orthodox Christianity, which they strictly differentiate from both primitive Christianity and Spiritualism.

== Structure ==
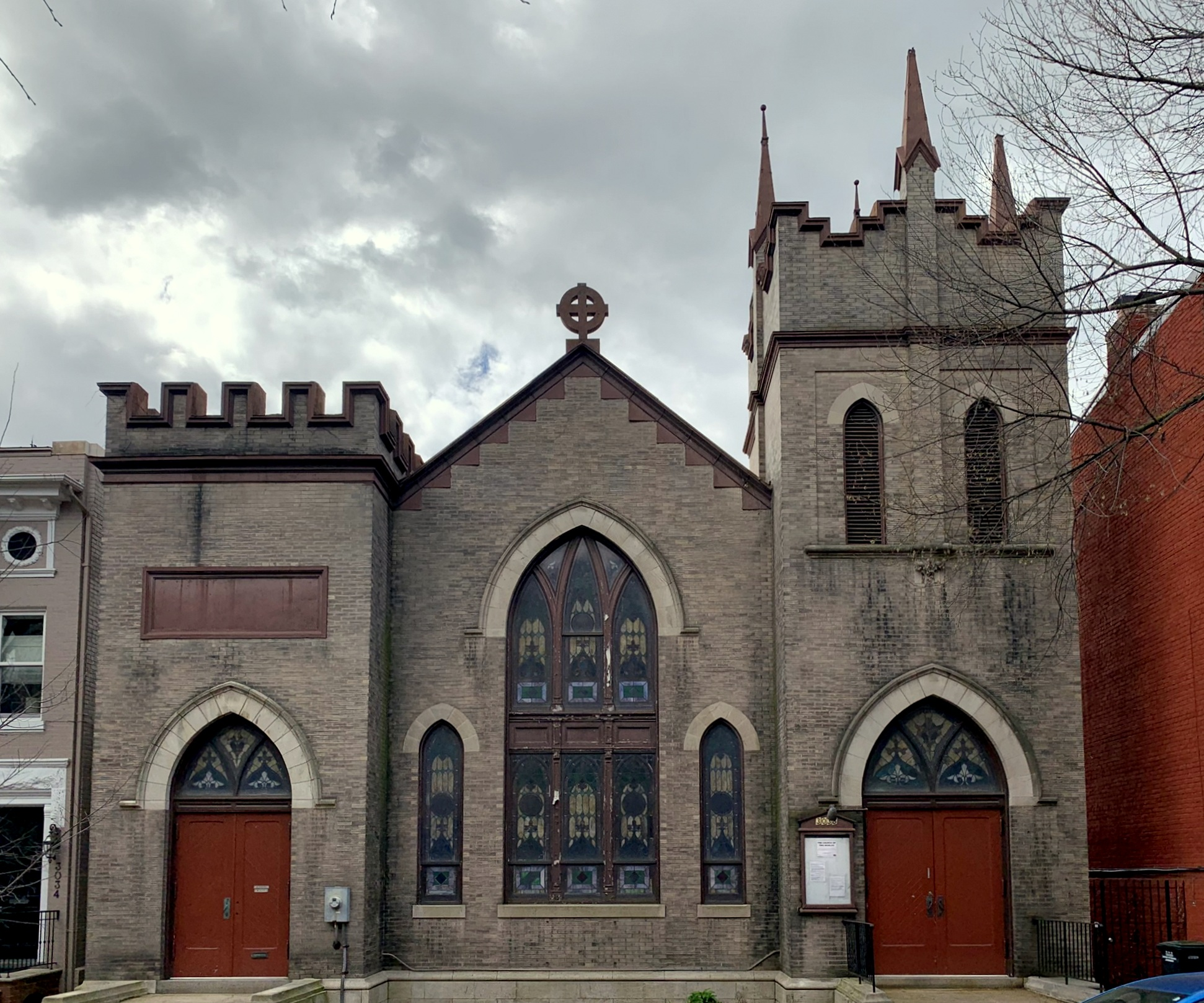
Church of Two Worlds in Georgetown, Washington, D.C.

The NSAC is a federation of state auxiliaries and local societies, organized by a national body of elected officers and trustees. Delegates representing the state and local bodies meet annually at a convention, at which they hold elections, make changes to the organization's constitution and by-laws, and otherwise conduct the business of the organization. The NSAC offers certifications and credentials for its Ministers, Commissioned Spiritualist Healers, Certified Mediums, and National Spiritualist Teachers. Coursework and exams for certifications are administered by the Morris Pratt Institute, an education auxiliary of the NSAC.

== Lyceums ==
Lyceums are educational bodies within Spiritualist organizations that mostly function like a Sunday School. In some Spiritualist organizations, they provide education and programming for children only and in others they are multigenerational. The NSAC's Lyceums are organized by local societies and facilitated by the national association.

The first Spiritualist Lyceum, Andrew Jackson Davis's Children's Progressive Lyceum, was organized in 1863, thirty-four years prior to the founding of the NSAC. Davis stressed the importance of a holistic approach to children's education, focusing on their healthy physical development, reasoning abilities, and "the unfolding of the social and spiritual affections." Delegates to the national convention elected the first National Superintendent of Lyceums in 1897. Since then, Lyceum leaders have continued to promote Davis's principles but they have generally abandoned his methods.

== Membership ==
Membership: In 2002 the association reported 144 member congregations. There are ten state associations and 11 camps. There were also four affiliated congregations of the National Spiritualist Churches of Canada in Ontario and Quebec.

== Educational Auxiliary ==
The NSAC's primary educational auxiliary is the Morris Pratt Institute in Wauwatosa, a suburb of Milwaukee, Wisconsin.

Morris Pratt built his "temple of spirit," which would later become the Morris Pratt Institute, in Whitewater, Wisconsin, in 1888. Although descriptions of the early layout of the building vary, most accounts describe it as containing offices, twelve dorm rooms, an apartment for Mr. and Mrs. Pratt, reception rooms, and lecture halls, one of which allegedly could seat 400 people. There were also rumors that the third floor was dedicated to séances, painted entirely in white, and was accessible only to white-robed, faithful Spiritualists. The building was assessed at $30,000 in 1901.

At the Ninth Annual convention of the National Spiritualist Association of Churches (NSAC) held in Washington, D.C. in October 1901, Morris and Zulema Pratt presented a letter to the NSAC asking them to take over management of the Institute and offering them the property to be utilized "for educational purposes." The NSA turned down the offer, arguing that the financial burden would be too much to take on for the eight-year-old organization. Undeterred, Pratt continued to organize the proposed school, incorporating the Morris Pratt Institute Association in 1901, and enlisting Moses Hull to be the college's first president. Just prior to his death in 1902, Pratt deeded the building to the Association. The college opened on September 29, 1903 with a staff of four. Hull taught homiletics and designed the curriculum; A. J. Weaver was the Principal, Florence Janson taught oratory, and Mattie Hull was in charge of the Psychic Department.

== The Hydesville Project ==
The Fox Property Project started in 1998 when the property was acquired by the NSAC and a memorial park was designed. This was home of the Fox family and the property in which Modern Spiritualism began. The site of the Fox cottage in Hydesville, New York, is thought to be a treasure for all Spiritualists and its restoration is supported by the descendants of the Fox sisters, pioneers at the beginning of Modern American Spiritualism. The NSAC is involved in fund raising to restore the property and grounds in time for the 160th anniversary of the advent of Modern Spiritualism (in 2008).

== Publications ==
The NSAC has published an official monthly journal since 1919, although the name has changed several times since its first issue.

- The National Spiritualist (Chicago, Ill.: The National Spiritualist Association, 1919-1962)
- The Summit of Spiritual Understanding (Cassadaga, Fla.: Stowe Memorial Foundation, 1963-1974)
- The National Spiritualist (Indianapolis, Ind.: Stow Memorial Foundation, 1974-1978)
- The National Spiritualist Summit of Spiritual Understanding (Indianapolis, Ind.: Summit Publications, 1979-1981)
- The National Spiritualist Summit (Indianapolis, Ind.: Summit Publications, 1981-)

The organization has also published Spotlight Magazine, a "magazine for children of all ages" published by the NSAC. Started in 1945 by Rev. Elsie Bunts of the Spot Light Parent and Teacher's Club of Michigan, it was published monthly for two years. In 1947, it became the official publication of the Lyceum and was issued ten times per year. The magazine contains articles and puzzles aimed both to educate and entertain.

== See also ==
- List of Spiritualist organizations
