= Spiritualism (movement) =

19th-century religious movement

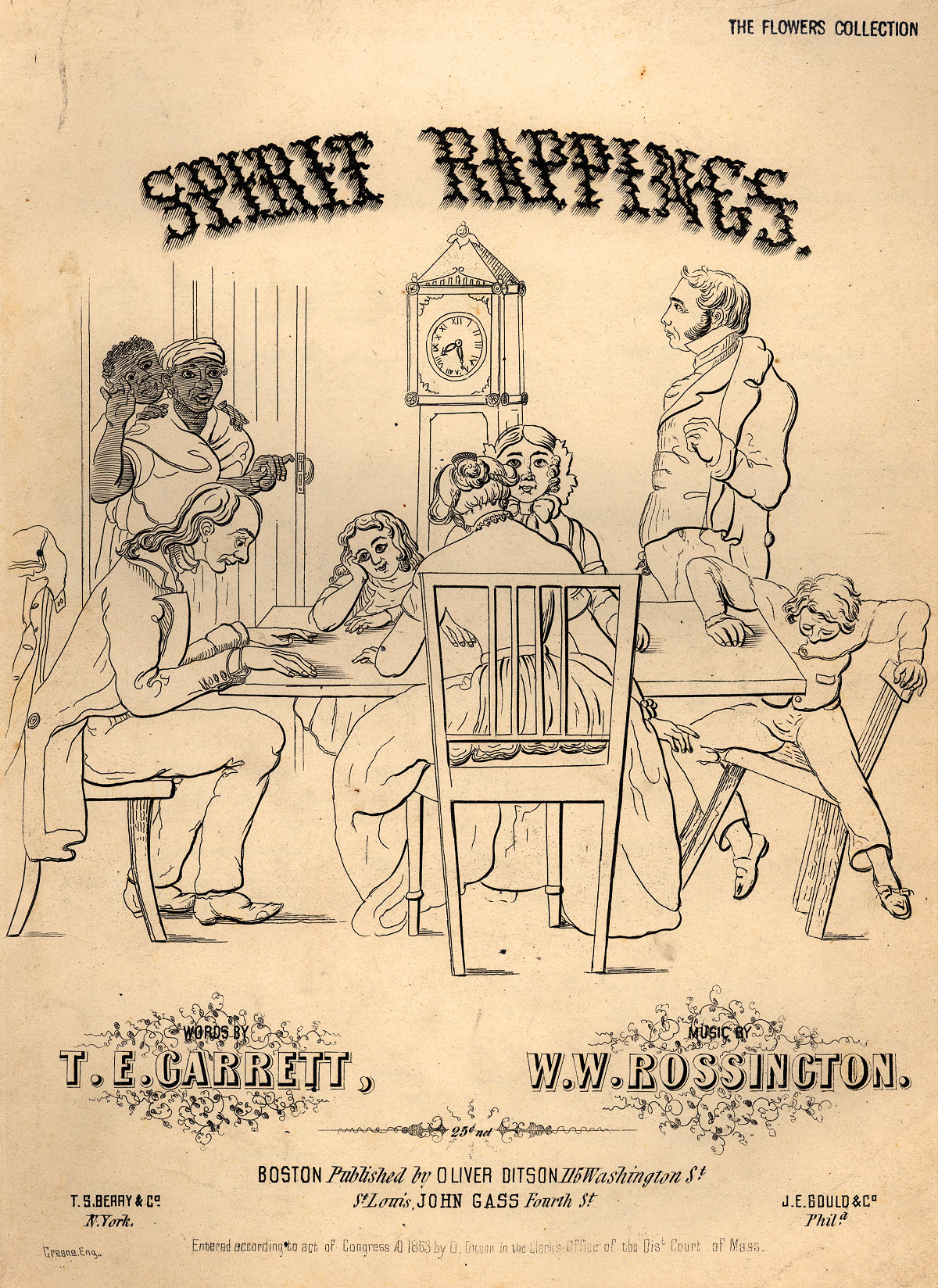
By 1853, when the popular song "Spirit Rappings" was published, spiritualism was an object of intense curiosity.

Spiritualism is a social religious movement popular in the nineteenth and early twentieth centuries, according to which an individual's awareness persists after death and may be contacted by the living. The afterlife, or the "spirit world", is seen by spiritualists not as a static place, but as one in which spirits continue to interact and evolve. These two beliefs—that contact with spirits is possible, and that spirits are more advanced than humans—lead spiritualists to the belief that spirits are capable of advising the living on moral and ethical issues and the nature of God. Some spiritualists follow "spirit guides"—specific spirits relied upon for spiritual direction.

Emanuel Swedenborg has some claim to be the father of spiritualism. The movement developed and reached its largest following from the 1840s to the 1920s, especially in English-speaking countries. It flourished for a half century without canonical texts or formal organization, attaining cohesion through periodicals, tours by trance lecturers, camp meetings, and the missionary activities of accomplished mediums. Many prominent spiritualists were women, and like most spiritualists, supported causes such as the abolition of slavery and women's suffrage. By the late 1880s the credibility of the informal movement had weakened due to accusations of fraud perpetrated by mediums, and formal spiritualist organizations began to appear. Spiritualism is currently practiced primarily through various denominational spiritualist churches in the U.S., Canada and the United Kingdom.

== Beliefs ==
=== Mediumship and spirits ===
Spiritualists believe in the possibility of communication with the spirits of dead people, whom they regard as "discarnate humans". They believe that spirit mediums are gifted to carry on such communication, but that anyone may become a medium through study and practice. They believe that spirits are capable of growth and perfection, progressing through higher spheres or planes, and that the afterlife is not a static state, but one in which spirits evolve. The two beliefs—that contact with spirits is possible, and that spirits may dwell on a higher plane—lead to a third belief, that spirits can provide knowledge about moral and ethical issues, as well as about God and the afterlife. Many believers, therefore, speak of "spirit guides"—specific spirits, often contacted and relied upon for worldly and spiritual guidance.

According to spiritualists, anyone can receive spirit messages, but formal communication sessions (séances) are conducted by mediums who claim to receive information about the afterlife.

=== Declaration of Principles ===
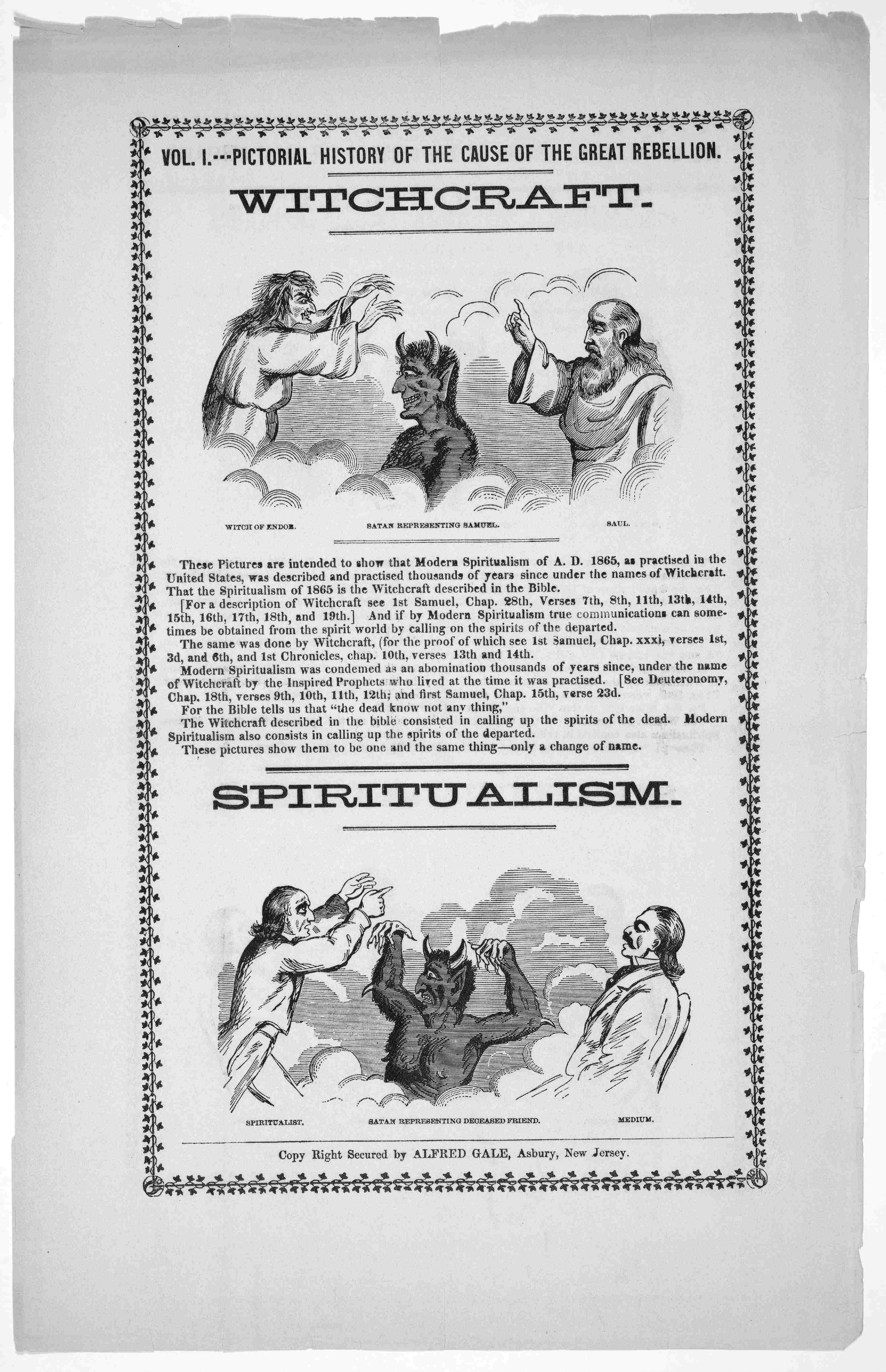
Spiritualism was equated by some Christians with witchcraft. This 1865 broadsheet, published in the United States, also blamed spiritualism for causing the American Civil War.

As an informal movement, spiritualism lacks a defined set of rules, but various spiritualist organizations in the United States have adopted variations of a "Declaration of Principles" developed between 1899 and 1944. In October 1899, a six-article "Declaration of Principles" was adopted by the National Spiritualist Association (NSA) at a convention in Chicago, Illinois. An additional two principles were added by the NSA in October 1909, at a convention in Rochester, New York. Then, in October 1944, a ninth principle was adopted by the National Spiritualist Association of Churches, at a convention in St. Louis, Missouri.

In the UK, the main organization representing spiritualism is the Spiritualists' National Union (SNU), whose teachings are based on the Seven Principles.

== Origins ==
Spiritualism first appeared in the 1840s in the "Burned-over District" of upstate New York, where earlier religious movements such as Millerism and Mormonism had emerged during the Second Great Awakening. However, Millerism and Mormonism did not associate themselves with spiritualism.

This region of New York State was an environment in which many thought direct communication with God or angels was possible, and that God would not behave harshly—for example, that God would not condemn unbaptised infants to an eternity in Hell.

=== Swedenborg and Mesmer ===
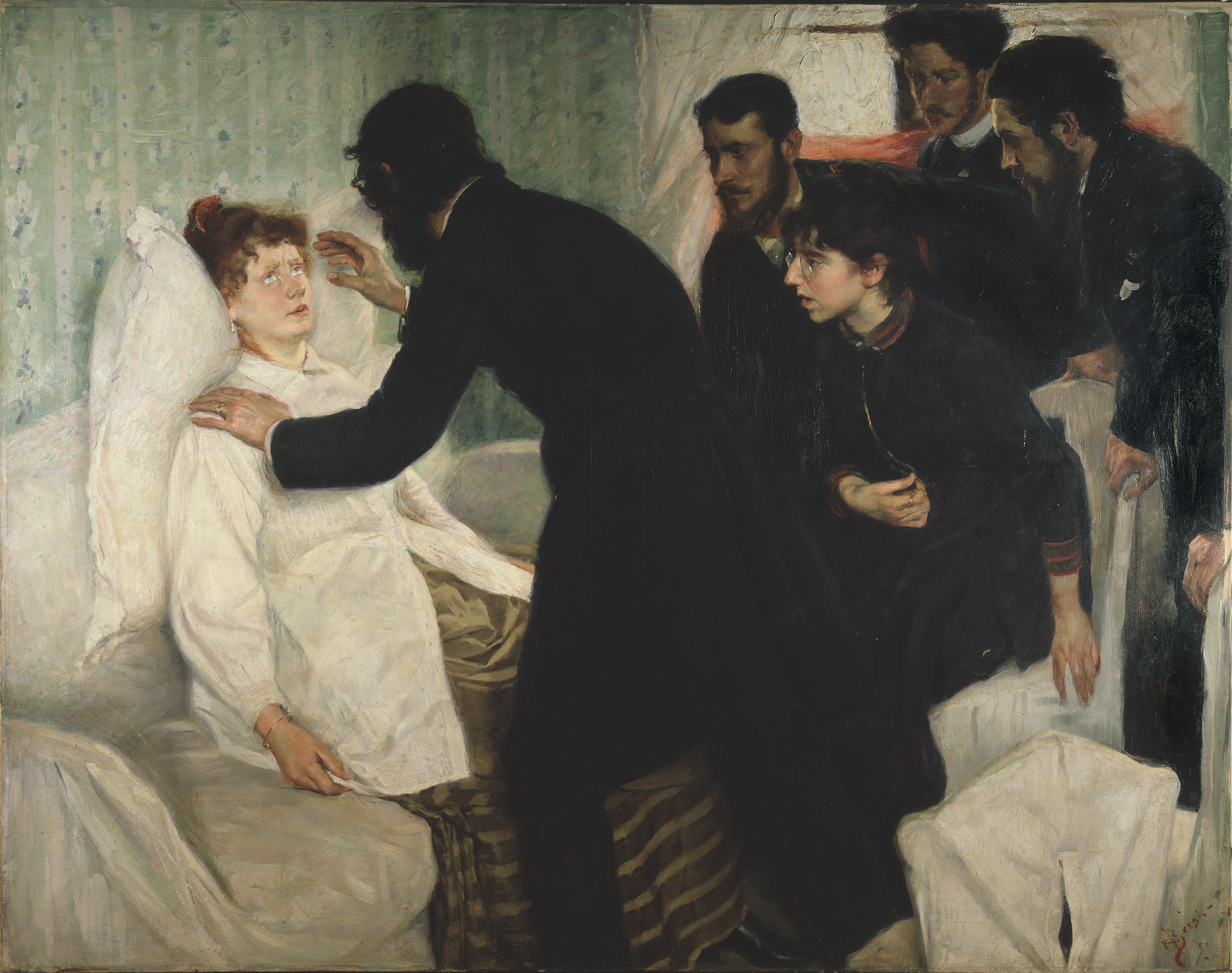
Hypnotic séance. Painting by Swedish artist Richard Bergh, 1887.

In this environment, the writings of Emanuel Swedenborg (1688–1772) and the teachings of Franz Mesmer (1734–1815) provided an example for those seeking direct personal knowledge of the afterlife. Swedenborg, who claimed to communicate with spirits while awake, described the structure of the spirit world. Two features of his view particularly resonated with the early spiritualists: first, that there is not a single Hell and a single Heaven, but rather a series of higher and lower heavens and hells; second, that spirits are intermediates between God and humans, so that the divine sometimes uses them as a means of communication. Although Swedenborg warned against seeking out spirit contact, his works seem to have inspired others with the desire to do so.

Swedenborg was formerly a highly regarded inventor and scientist, having achieved several notable engineering innovations and studied physiology and anatomy. Then, "in 1741, he also began to have a series of intense mystical experiences, dreams, and visions, claiming that he had been called by God to reform Christianity and introduce a new church."

Mesmer did not contribute religious beliefs, but he brought a technique, later known as hypnotism, that it was claimed could induce trances and cause subjects to report contact with supernatural beings. There was a great deal of professional showmanship inherent to demonstrations of Mesmerism, and the practitioners who lectured in mid-19th-century North America sought to entertain their audiences as well as to demonstrate methods for personal contact with the divine.

Perhaps the best known of those who combined Swedenborg and Mesmer in a peculiarly North American synthesis was Andrew Jackson Davis, who called his system the "harmonial philosophy". Davis was a practising Mesmerist, faith healer and clairvoyant from Blooming Grove, New York. He was also strongly influenced by the socialist theories of Fourierism. His 1847 book, The Principles of Nature, Her Divine Revelations, and a Voice to Mankind, dictated to a friend while in a trance state, eventually became the nearest thing to a canonical work in a spiritualist movement whose extreme individualism precluded the development of a single coherent worldview.

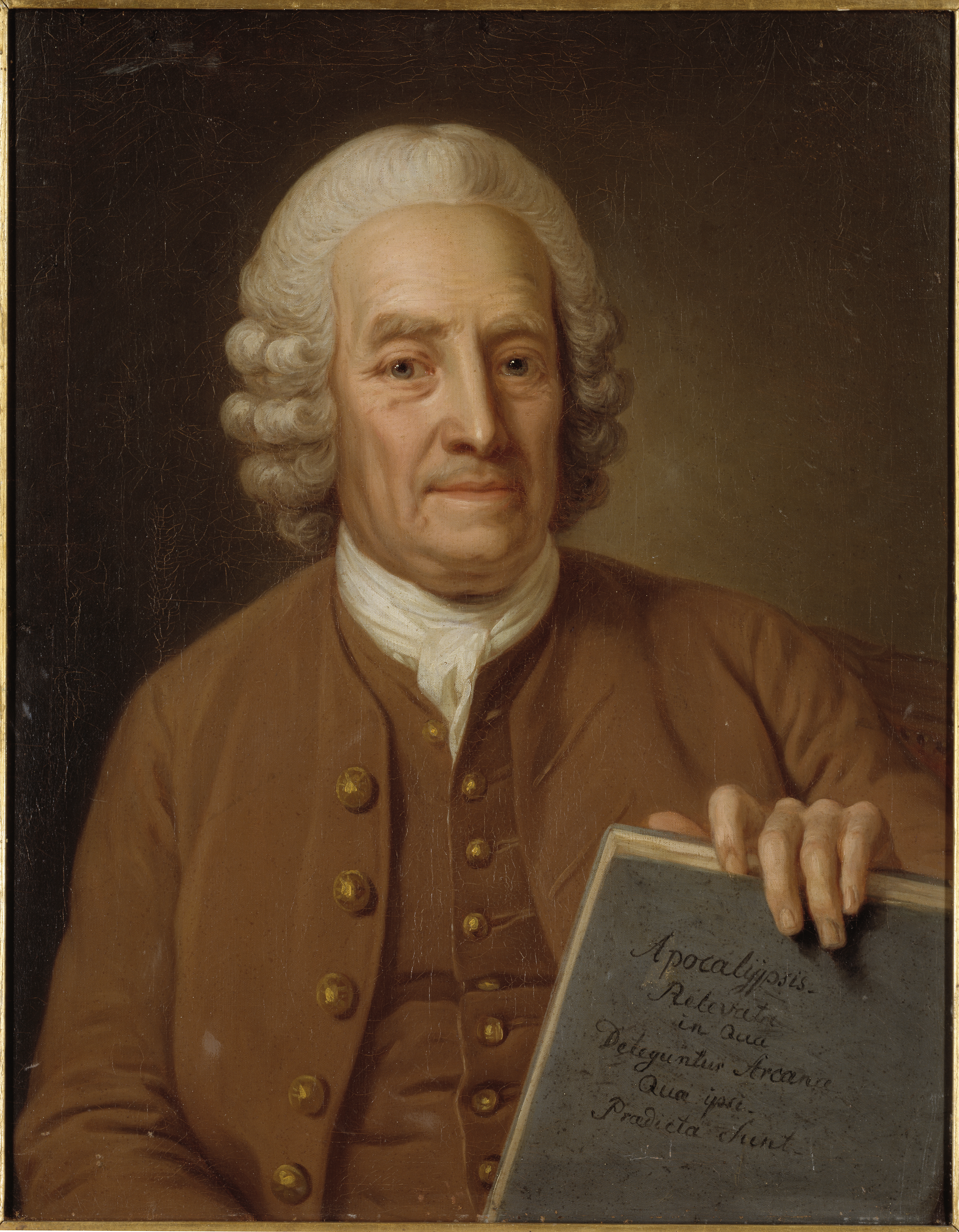
Emanuel Swedenborg

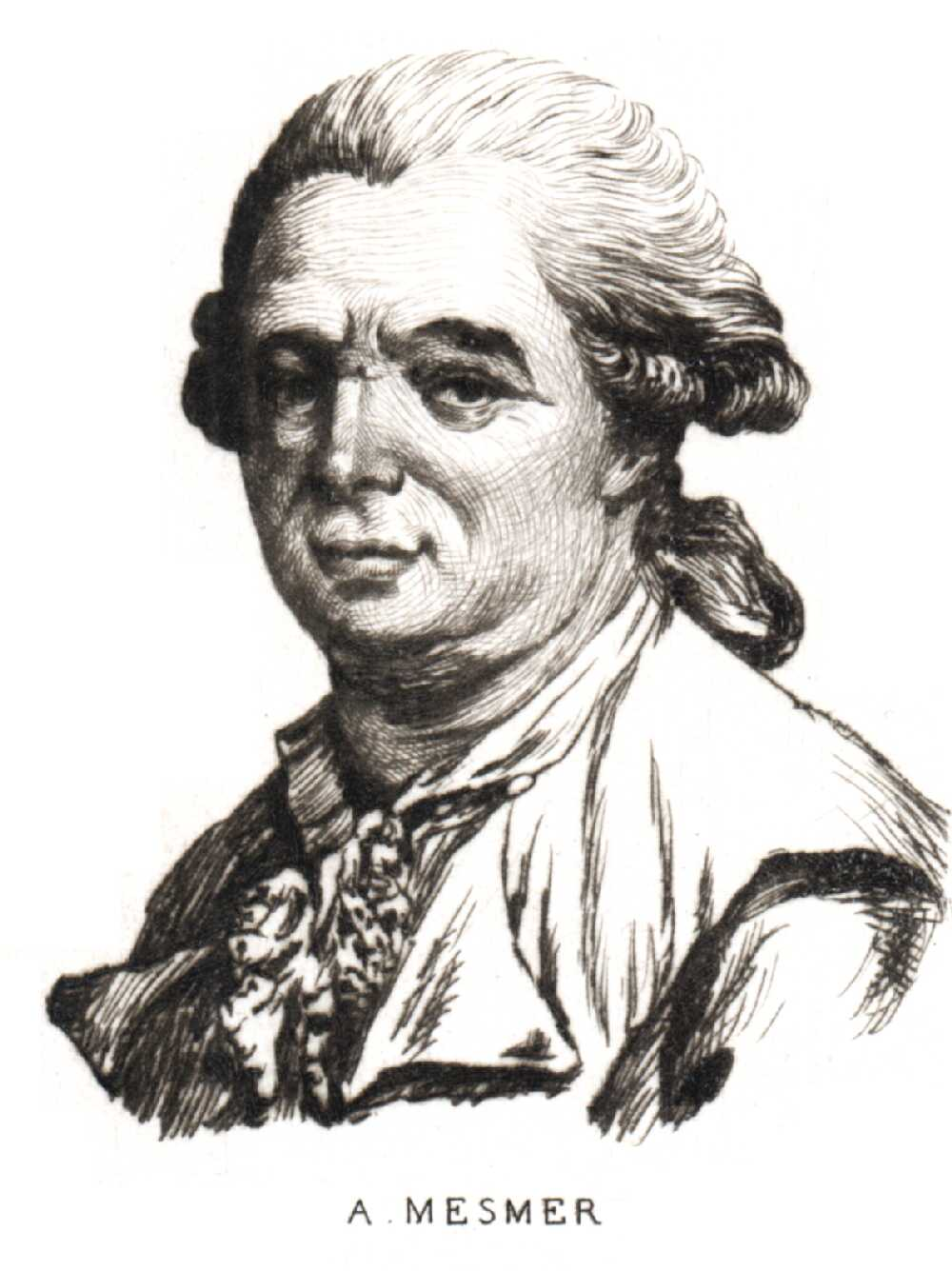
Franz Mesmer

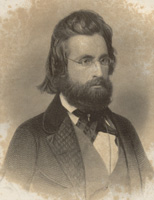
Andrew Jackson Davis, about 1860

=== Reform-movement links ===
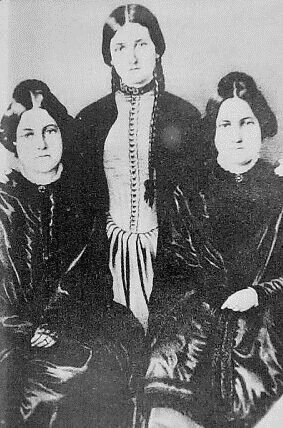
The Fox sisters

Spiritualists often set March 31, 1848, as the beginning of their movement. On that date, Kate and Margaret Fox, of Hydesville, New York, reported that they had made contact with a spirit that was later claimed to be the spirit of a murdered peddler whose body was found in the house, though no record of such a person was ever found. The spirit was said to have communicated through rapping noises, audible to onlookers. The evidence of the senses appealed to practically minded Americans, and the Fox sisters became a sensation. As the first celebrity mediums, the sisters quickly became famous for their public séances in New York. However, in 1888, the Fox sisters admitted that this contact with the spirit was a hoax, though shortly afterward they recanted that admission.

Amy and Isaac Post, Hicksite Quakers from Rochester, New York, had long been acquainted with the Fox family, and took the two girls into their home in the late spring of 1848. Immediately convinced of the veracity of the sisters' communications, they became early converts and introduced the young mediums to their circle of radical Quaker friends.

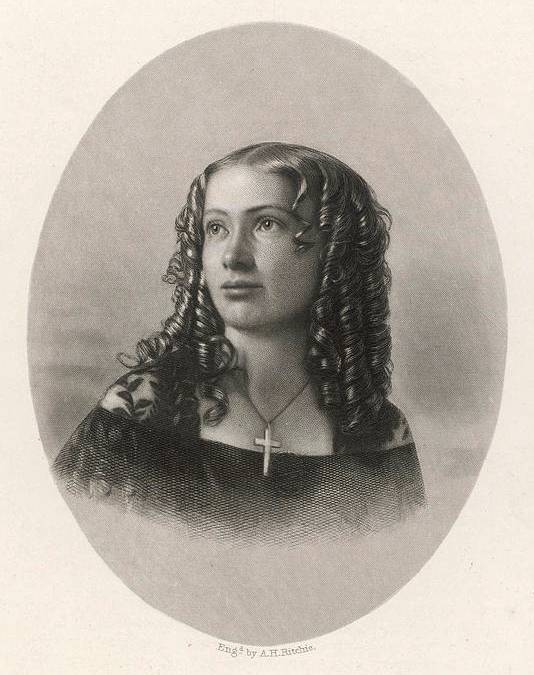
Cora L. V. Scott

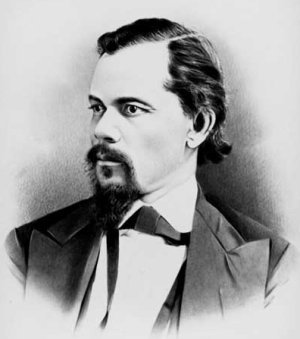
Paschal Beverly Randolph

Consequently, many early participants in spiritualism were radical Quakers and others involved in the mid-nineteenth-century reforming movement. These reformers were uncomfortable with the more mainstream churches because those churches did little to fight slavery and even less to advance the cause of women's rights.

Such links with reform movements, often radically socialist, had already been prepared in the 1840s, as the example of Andrew Jackson Davis shows. After 1848, many socialists became ardent spiritualists or occultists.

The most popular trance lecturer before the American Civil War was Cora L. V. Scott (1840–1923). Young and beautiful, her appearance on stage fascinated men. Her audiences were struck by the contrast between her physical girlishness and the eloquence with which she spoke of spiritual matters, and found in that contrast support for the notion that spirits were speaking through her. Cora married four times and, on each occasion, adopted her husband's last name. During her period of greatest activity, she was known as Cora Hatch.

Another spiritualist was Achsa W. Sprague, who was born November 17, 1827, in Plymouth Notch, Vermont. At the age of 20, she became ill with rheumatic fever and credited her eventual recovery to intercession by spirits. An extremely popular trance lecturer, she traveled about the United States until her death in 1861. Sprague was an abolitionist and an advocate of women's rights.

Another spiritualist and trance medium before the Civil War was Paschal Beverly Randolph (1825–1875), a man of mixed race, who also played a part in the abolitionist movement. Nevertheless, many abolitionists and reformers held themselves aloof from the spiritualist movement; among the skeptics was abolitionist Frederick Douglass.

Another social reform movement with significant spiritualist involvement was the effort to improve the conditions of Native Americans. Kathryn Troy writes in a study of Indian ghosts in seances:

Undoubtedly, on some level spiritualists recognized the Indian spectres that appeared at seances as a symbol of the sins and subsequent guilt of the United States in its dealings with Native Americans. Spiritualists were literally haunted by the presence of Indians. But for many that guilt was not assuaged: rather, in order to confront the haunting and rectify it, they were galvanized into action. The political activism of spiritualists on behalf of Indians was thus the result of combining white guilt and fear of divine judgment with a new sense of purpose and responsibility.

=== Believers and skeptics ===
In the years following the sensation that greeted the Fox sisters, demonstrations of mediumship (séances and automatic writing, for example) proved to be a profitable venture, and soon became popular forms of entertainment and spiritual catharsis. The Fox sisters earned a living this way, and others followed their lead. Showmanship became an increasingly important part of spiritualism, and the visible, audible, and tangible evidence of spirits escalated as mediums competed for paying audiences. As independent investigating commissions repeatedly established, most notably the 1887 report of the Seybert Commission, fraud was widespread, and some of these cases were prosecuted in court.

Despite numerous instances of chicanery, the appeal of spiritualism was strong. Prominent in the ranks of its adherents were those grieving the death of a loved one. Many families during the time of the American Civil War had seen their men go off and never return, and images of the battlefield, produced through the new medium of photography, demonstrated that their loved ones had not only died in overwhelmingly huge numbers, but horribly as well. One well known case is that of Mary Todd Lincoln, who, grieving the loss of her son, organized séances in the White House which were attended by her husband, President Abraham Lincoln. The surge of Spiritualism during this time, and later during World War I, was a direct response to those massive battlefield casualties.

In addition, the movement appealed to reformers, who fortuitously found that the spirits favoured such causes du jour as abolition of slavery, and equal rights for women. It also appealed to some who had a materialist orientation and rejected organized religion. In 1854 the utopian socialist Robert Owen was converted to spiritualism after "sittings" with the American medium Maria B. Hayden (credited with introducing spiritualism to England). Owen made a public profession of his new faith in his publication The Rational Quarterly Review and later wrote a pamphlet, "The future of the Human race; or great glorious and future revolution to be effected through the agency of departed spirits of good and superior men and women".

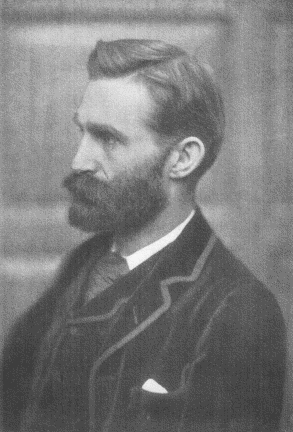
Frank Podmore, c. 1895

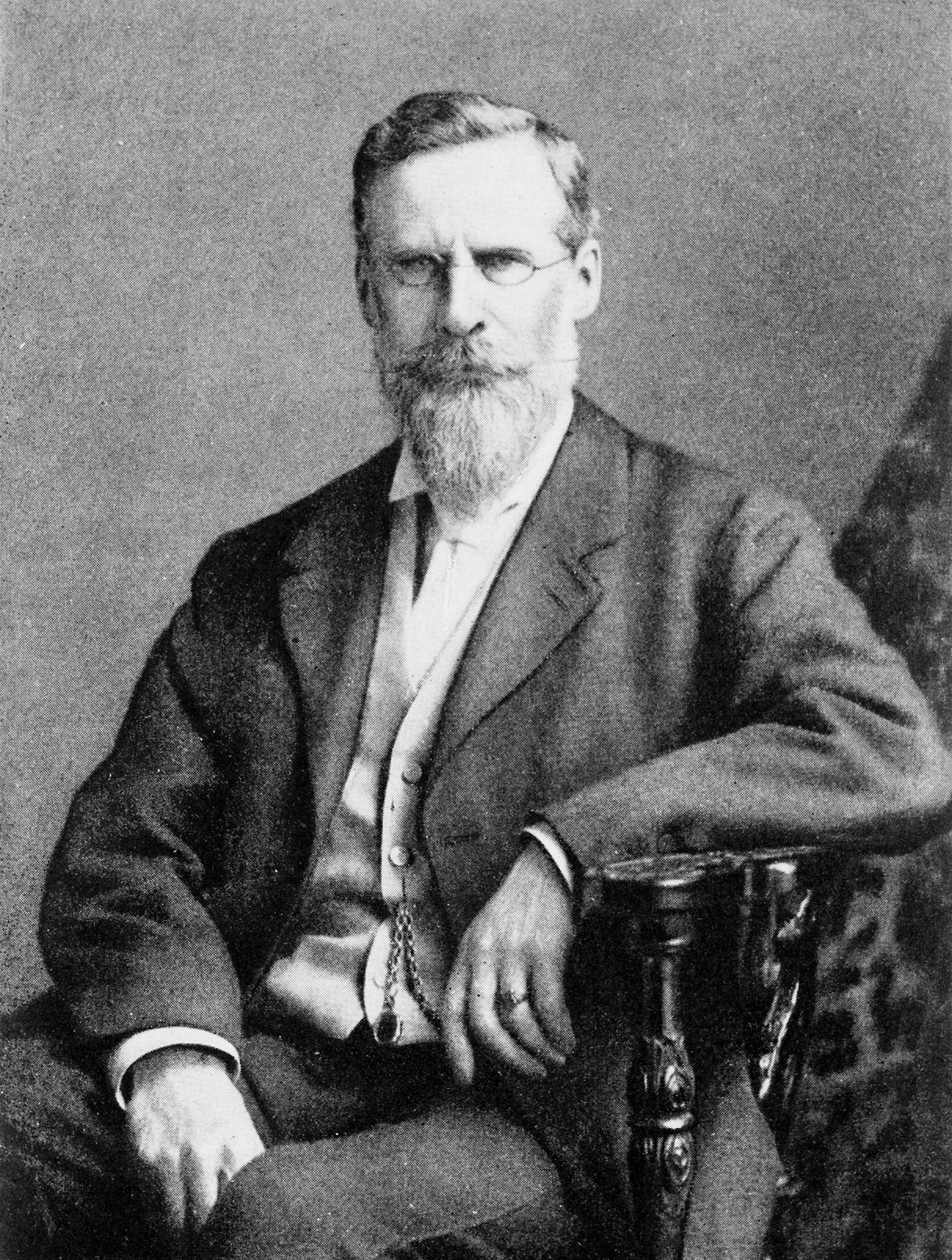
William Crookes. Photo published 1904.

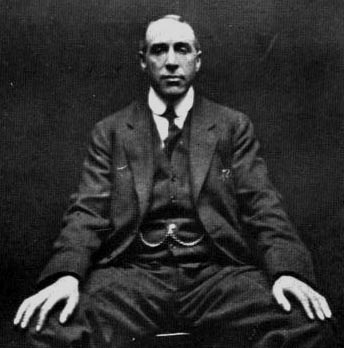
Harry Price, 1922

A number of scientists who investigated the phenomenon also became converts. They included chemist and physicist William Crookes (1832–1919), evolutionary biologist Alfred Russel Wallace (1823–1913) and physicist Sir Oliver Lodge. Nobel laureate Pierre Curie was impressed by the mediumistic performances of Eusapia Palladino and advocated their scientific study. Other prominent adherents included journalist and pacifist William T. Stead (1849–1912) and physician and author Arthur Conan Doyle (1859–1930).

Doyle, who lost his son Kingsley in World War I, was also a member of the Ghost Club. Founded in London in 1862, its focus was the scientific study of alleged paranormal activities in order to prove (or refute) the existence of paranormal phenomena. Members of the club included Charles Dickens, Sir William Crookes, Sir William F. Barrett, and Harry Price. The Paris séances of Eusapia Palladino were attended by an enthusiastic Pierre Curie and a dubious Marie Curie. Thomas Edison wanted to develop a "spirit phone", an ethereal device that would summon to the living the voices of the dead and record them for posterity.

The Society for Psychical Research was the earliest institution of the Spiritualism movement and founded in 1882. Its members included highly-regarded European scientists and intellectuals. It investigated "debatable phenomena designated by such terms as mesmeric, psychical, and Spiritualistic." The society set up a Committee on Haunted Houses. The society sought to approach such questions "without prejudice or prepossession of any kind, and in the same spirit of exact and unimpassioned inquiry which has enabled Science to solve so many problems, once not less obscure nor less hotly debated."

Prominent investigators who exposed cases of fraud came from a variety of backgrounds, including professional researchers such as Frank Podmore of the Society for Psychical Research and Harry Price of the National Laboratory of Psychical Research, and professional conjurers such as John Nevil Maskelyne. Maskelyne exposed the Davenport brothers by appearing in the audience during their shows and explaining how the trick was done.

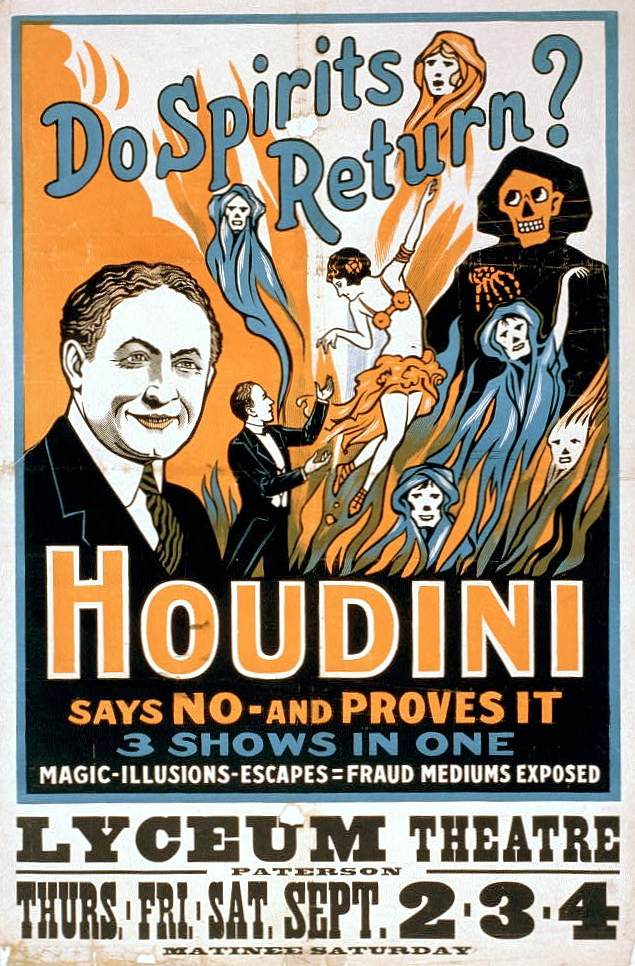
Houdini exposed the tricks of "mediums"

The psychical researcher Hereward Carrington exposed fraudulent mediums' tricks, such as those used in slate-writing, table-turning, trumpet mediumship, materializations, sealed-letter reading, and spirit photography. The skeptic Joseph McCabe, in his book Is Spiritualism Based on Fraud? (1920), documented many fraudulent mediums and their tricks.

Magicians and writers on magic have a long history of exposing the fraudulent methods of mediumship. During the 1920s, professional magician Harry Houdini undertook a well-publicised campaign to expose fraudulent mediums; he was adamant that "Up to the present time everything that I have investigated has been the result of deluded brains." Other magician or magic-author debunkers of spiritualist mediumship have included Chung Ling Soo, Henry Evans, Julien Proskauer, Fulton Oursler, Joseph Dunninger, and Joseph Rinn.

In February 1921, Thomas Lynn Bradford, in an experiment designed to ascertain the existence of an afterlife, committed suicide in his apartment by blowing out the pilot light on his heater and turning on the gas. After that date, no further communication from him was received by an associate whom he had recruited for the purpose.

=== Unorganized movement ===
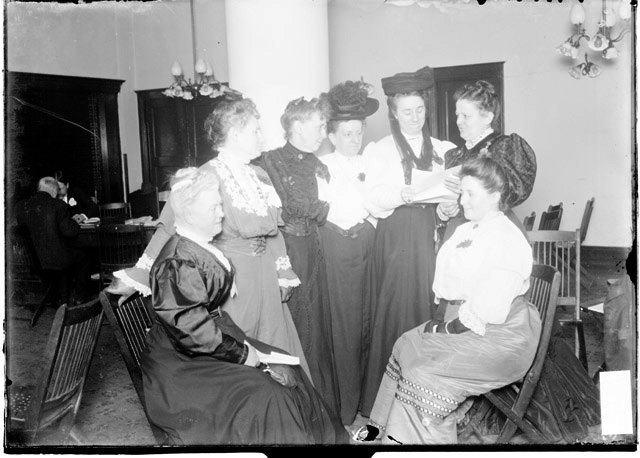
Middle-class Chicago women discuss spiritualism (1906)

The movement quickly spread throughout the world; though only in the United Kingdom did it become as widespread as in the United States. Spiritualist organizations were formed in America and Europe, such as the London Spiritualist Alliance, which published a newspaper called The Light, featuring articles such as "Evenings at Home in Spiritual Séance", "Ghosts in Africa" and "Chronicles of Spirit Photography", advertisements for "mesmerists" and patent medicines, and letters from readers about personal contact with ghosts. In Britain, by 1853, invitations to tea among the prosperous and fashionable often included table-turning, a type of séance in which spirits were said to communicate with people seated around a table by tilting and rotating the table. By 1897, spiritualism was said to have more than eight million followers in the United States and Europe, mostly drawn from the middle and upper classes.

Spiritualism was primarily a middle- and upper-class movement, and it was especially popular among women. American spiritualists would meet in private homes for séances, at lecture halls for trance lectures, at state or national conventions, and at summer camps attended by thousands. Among the most significant of the camp meetings were Camp Etna, in Etna, Maine; Onset Bay Grove, in Onset, Massachusetts; Lily Dale, in western New York State; Camp Chesterfield, in Indiana; the Wonewoc Spiritualist Camp, in Wonewoc, Wisconsin; and Lake Pleasant, in Montague, Massachusetts. In founding camp meetings, the spiritualists appropriated a form developed by U.S. Protestant denominations in the early nineteenth century. Spiritualist camp meetings were located most densely in New England, but were also established across the upper Midwest. Cassadaga, Florida, is the most notable spiritualist camp meeting in the southern United States.

Several spiritualist periodicals emerged in the nineteenth century, playing a significant role in maintaining the movement's cohesion. Among the most important were the weeklies, the Banner of Light (Boston), the Religio-Philosophical Journal (Chicago), Mind and Matter (Philadelphia), the Spiritualist (London), and the Medium (London). Other influential periodicals were the Revue Spirite (France), Le Messager (Belgium), Annali dello Spiritismo (Italy), El Criterio Espiritista (Spain), and the Harbinger of Light (Australia). By 1880, approximately three dozen monthly spiritualist periodicals were published worldwide. These periodicals differed a great deal from one another, reflecting the great differences among spiritualists. Some, such as the British Spiritual Magazine were Christian and conservative, openly rejecting the reform currents that were so strong within spiritualism. Others, such as Human Nature, were pointedly non-Christian and supportive of socialist and reform efforts. Still others, such as the Spiritualist, attempted to view spiritualist phenomena from a scientific perspective, eschewing discussion on both theological and reform issues.

Books on the supernatural were published for the growing middle class, such as 1852's Mysteries, by Charles Elliott, which contains "sketches of spirits and spiritual things", including accounts of the Salem witch trials, the Lane ghost, and the Rochester rappings. The Night Side of Nature, by Catherine Crowe, published in 1853, provided definitions and accounts of wraiths, doppelgängers, apparitions, and haunted houses.

Mainstream newspapers treated stories of ghosts and haunting as they would any other news story. An account in the Chicago Daily Tribune in 1891, "sufficiently bloody to suit the most fastidious taste", tells of a house believed to be haunted by the ghosts of three murder victims seeking revenge against their killer's son, who was eventually driven insane.

Certain methods intended to ward off spirits developed alongside broader nineteenth century interest in spirits and supernatural phenomena. In parts of the American South, many vernacular homes had ceilings or exterior woodwork painted a pale blue. It was believed that restless spirits, sometimes called “haints”, could be warded off by this pale blue color. This pale blue color became widely known as “haint blue” since it was thought that the pale blue could repel or confuse evil spirits. Architectural historian Edward A. Chappel notes that blue house paint was understood as a protective measure against demons, reflecting how spiritual beliefs influenced architectural design and everyday life.

Many families, "having no faith in ghosts", thereafter moved into the house, but all soon moved out again.

In the 1920s, numerous "psychic" books were published, ranging in quality. Such books were often based on excursions initiated by the use of Ouija boards. A few of these popular books displayed unorganized spiritualism, though most were less insightful.

The movement was extremely individualistic, with each person relying on their own experiences and readings to discern the nature of the afterlife. The organisation was therefore slow to appear, and when it did, it was resisted by mediums and trance lecturers. Most members were content to attend Christian churches, and particularly universalist churches harboured many spiritualists.

As the spiritualism movement began to fade, partly through the publicity of fraud accusations and partly through the appeal of religious movements such as Christian Science, the Spiritualist Church was organised. This church can claim to be the main vestige of the movement left today in the United States.

=== Other mediums ===
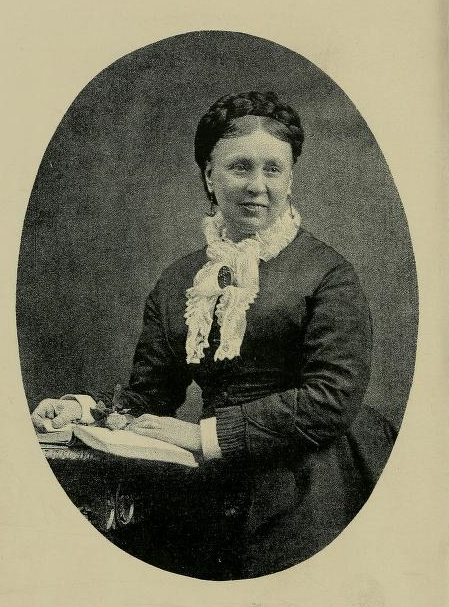
Emma Hardinge Britten

Within Spiritualist practice, mediumship has been categorized into three principal forms: mental mediumship, physical mediumship, and direct voice mediumship. Mental mediumship involves the reception and relay of spirit communications through the medium's own consciousness — including clairvoyance, clairaudience, and clairsentience — without observable physical phenomena. Physical mediumship involves claimed observable phenomena produced in the séance space, including the movement of objects, materialization of forms, and levitation, purportedly produced through the medium's interaction with spirit forces. Direct voice mediumship is distinguished from both by its central claim that spirit voices manifest independently and audibly within the séance space, emanating not from the medium's vocal apparatus but from an external location in the room.

Daniel Dunglas Home (1833–1886) is regarded as the most documented physical medium in the history of Spiritualism. Home conducted hundreds of séances attended by eminent Victorians, performing in full daylight rather than the darkened conditions typical of the period — a practice that distinguished him from many contemporaries and contributed to his reputation for transparency. Arthur Conan Doyle described Home as uniquely proficient across four distinct forms of mediumship: direct voice, trance speaking, clairvoyance, and physical mediumship.

Between 1870 and 1873, chemist and physicist William Crookes conducted controlled experiments with Home and issued a report in 1874 concluding that the phenomena produced were genuine — a finding that generated significant controversy within the scientific establishment. Despite extensive scrutiny by investigators and stage magicians, no method of fraud was conclusively demonstrated during his lifetime.

Leslie Flint (1911–1994) was a British medium described by Spiritualists as the most prominent direct voice practitioner of the twentieth century. Flint claimed to produce independent spirit voices emanating from a location external to his own body, typically a few feet above and to one side of his head, while remaining fully conscious throughout his séances — a practice he distinguished explicitly from trance mediumship. His sessions were frequently recorded, and the resulting archive has been preserved by the Leslie Flint Trust as a documentary record of twentieth-century direct voice mediumship practice. Skeptics identified alleged frauds during his career, and his claims were not verified under controlled scientific conditions.

London-born Emma Hardinge Britten (1823–99) moved to the United States in 1855 and was active in spiritualist circles as a trance lecturer and organiser. She is best known as a chronicler of the movement's spread, especially in her 1884 Nineteenth Century Miracles: Spirits and Their Work in Every Country of the Earth, and her 1870 Modern American Spiritualism, a detailed account of claims and investigations of mediumship beginning with the earliest days of the movement.

William Stainton Moses (1839–92) was an Anglican clergyman who, in the period from 1872 to 1883, filled 24 notebooks with automatic writing, much of which was said to describe conditions in the spirit world. However, Frank Podmore was skeptical of his alleged ability to communicate with spirits and Joseph McCabe described Moses as a "deliberate impostor", suggesting his apports and all of his feats were the result of trickery.

Eusapia Palladino (1854–1918) was an Italian spiritualist medium from the slums of Naples who made a career touring Italy, France, Germany, Britain, the United States, Russia, and Poland. Palladino was said by believers to perform spiritualist phenomena in the dark: levitating tables, producing apports, and materializing spirits. Upon investigation, all these things were found to be the result of deception.

The British medium William Eglinton (1857–1933) claimed to perform spiritualist phenomena such as movement of objects and materializations. All of his feats were exposed as tricks.

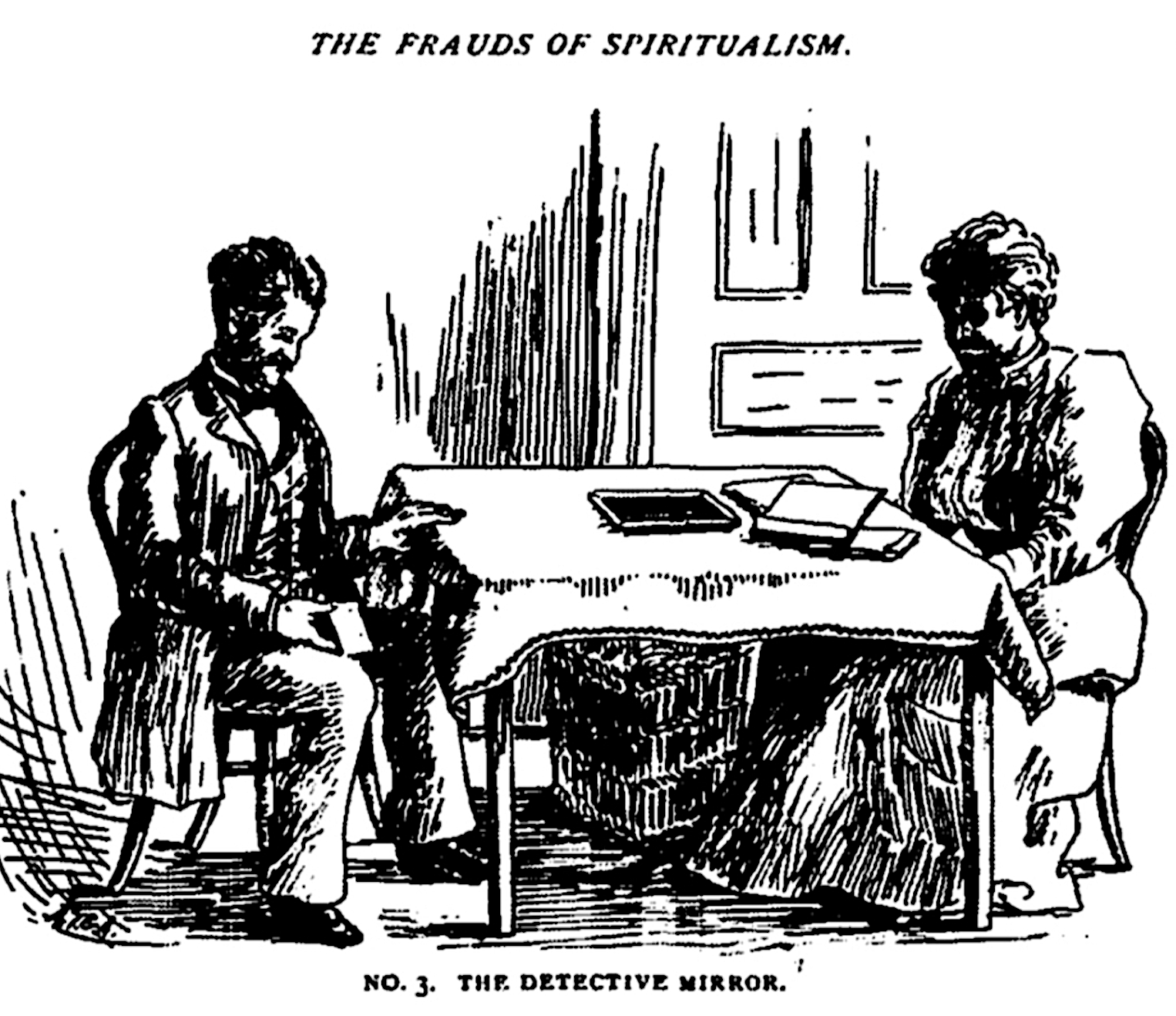
Krebs using a mirror to expose the tricks of the Bangs sisters. From Suggestion magazine.

The Bangs Sisters, Mary "May" E. Bangs (1862–1917) and Elizabeth "Lizzie" Snow Bangs (1859–1920), were two spiritualist mediums based in Chicago, who made a career out of painting the dead or "spirit portraits".

Mina Crandon (1888–1941), a spiritualist medium in the 1920s, was known for producing an ectoplasm hand during her séances. The hand was later exposed as a trick when biologists found it to be made from a piece of carved animal liver. In 1934, the psychical researcher Walter Franklin Prince described the Crandon case as "the most ingenious, persistent, and fantastic complex of fraud in the history of psychic research."

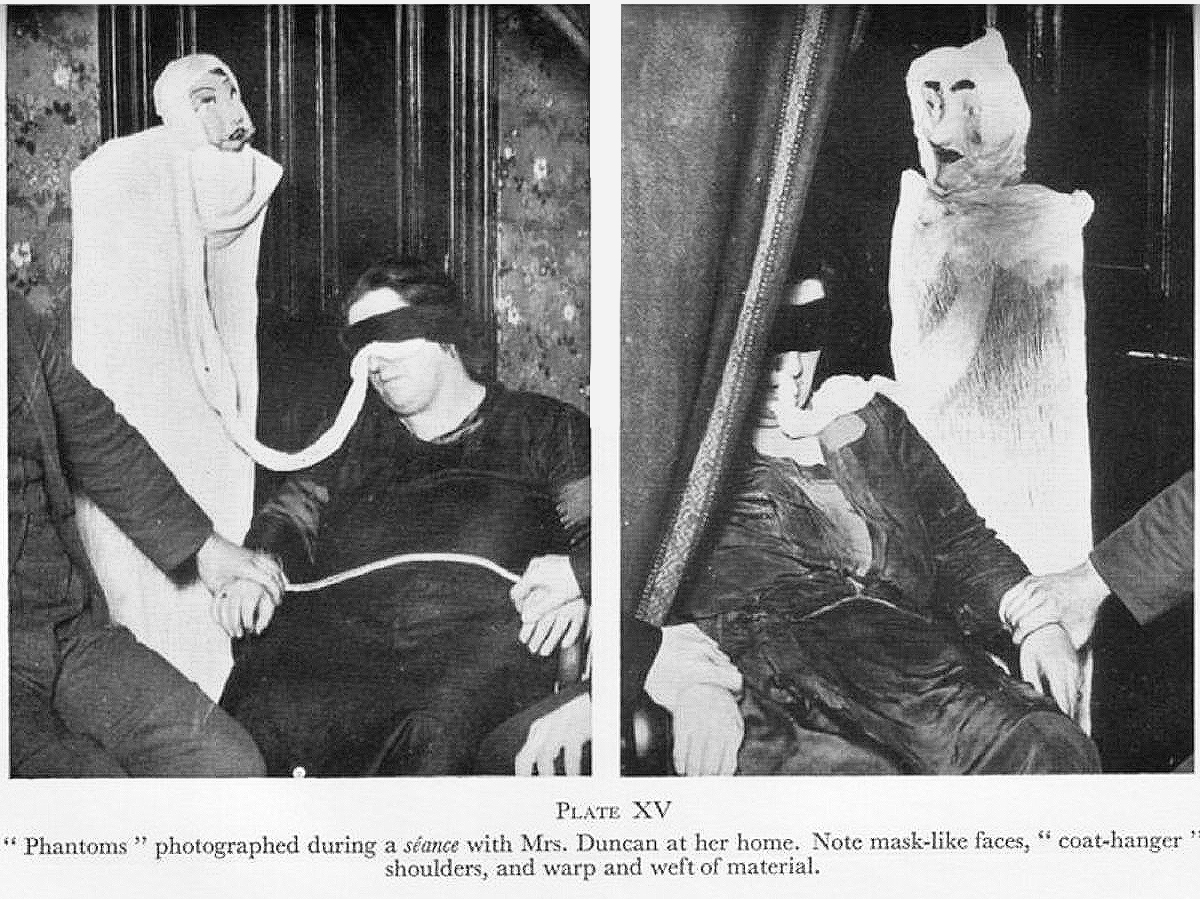
Helen Duncan

The American voice medium Etta Wriedt (1859–1942) was exposed as a fraud by the physicist Kristian Birkeland when he discovered that the noises produced by her trumpet were caused by chemical explosions induced by potassium and water, and in other cases by lycopodium powder.

Another well-known medium was the Scottish materialization medium Helen Duncan (1897–1956). In 1928, photographer Harvey Metcalfe attended a series of séances at Duncan's house and took flash photographs of Duncan and her alleged "materialization" spirits, including her spirit guide "Peggy". The photographs revealed the "spirits" to have been fraudulently produced, using dolls made from painted papier-mâché masks, draped in old sheets. Duncan was later tested by Harry Price at the National Laboratory of Psychical Research; photographs revealed Duncan's ectoplasm to be made from cheesecloth, rubber gloves, and cut-out heads from magazine covers.

== Evolution ==
Spiritualists reacted with uncertainty to the theories of evolution in the late 19th and early 20th century. Broadly speaking, the concept of evolution aligned with the spiritualist thought of progressive human development. At the same time, however, the belief in the animal origins of humanity threatened the foundation of the immortality of the spirit, for if humans had not been created by God, it was scarcely plausible that they would be specially endowed with spirits. This led to spiritualists embracing spiritual evolution.

The spiritualists' view of evolution did not stop at death. Spiritualism taught that after death, spirits progressed to spiritual states in new spheres of existence. According to spiritualists, evolution occurred in the spirit world "at a rate more rapid and under conditions more favourable to growth" than encountered on Earth.

In a talk at the London Spiritualist Alliance, John Page Hopps (1834–1911) supported both evolution and spiritualism. Hopps claimed humanity had started off imperfect "out of the animal's darkness" but would rise into the "angel's marvellous light". Hopps claimed that humans were not fallen but rising creatures, and that after death, they would evolve on various spheres of existence to perfection.

Theosophy is in opposition to the spiritualist interpretation of evolution. Theosophy teaches a metaphysical theory of evolution mixed with human devolution. Spiritualists do not accept the devolution of the theosophists. To theosophy, humanity starts in a state of perfection (see Golden age) and falls into a process of progressive materialization (devolution), developing the mind and losing the spiritual consciousness. After the gathering of experience and growth through repeated reincarnations, humanity will regain the original spiritual state, which is now one of self-conscious perfection.

Theosophy and spiritualism were both very popular metaphysical schools of thought, especially in the early 20th century, and thus often clashed over their differing beliefs. Madame Blavatsky was critical of spiritualism; she distanced theosophy from spiritualism as far as possible and aligned herself with Eastern occultism.

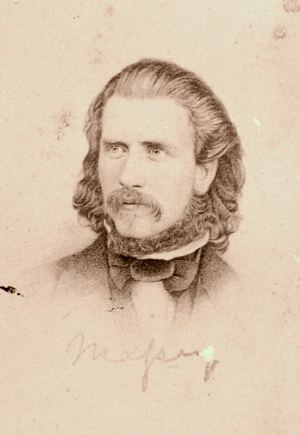
Gerald Massey

One medium who rejected evolution was Cora L. V. Scott; she dismissed evolution in her lectures and instead supported a type of pantheistic spiritualism. The spiritualist Gerald Massey wrote that Darwin's theory of evolution was incomplete.

Alfred Russel Wallace believed qualitative novelties could arise through the process of spiritual evolution, in particular, the phenomena of life and mind. Wallace attributed these novelties to a supernatural agency. Later in his life, Wallace was an advocate of spiritualism and believed in an immaterial origin for the higher mental faculties of humans; he believed that evolution suggested that the universe had a purpose, and that certain aspects of living organisms are not explainable in terms of purely materialistic processes, in a 1909 magazine article entitled "The World of Life", which he later expanded into a book of the same name. Wallace argued in his 1911 book World of Life for a spiritual approach to evolution and described evolution as "creative power, directive mind and ultimate purpose". Wallace believed natural selection could not explain intelligence or morality in the human being so suggested that non-material spiritual forces accounted for these. Wallace believed the spiritual nature of humanity could not have come about by natural selection alone, the origins of the spiritual nature must originate "in the unseen universe of spirit".

Oliver Lodge also promoted a version of spiritual evolution in his books Man and the Universe (1908), Making of Man (1924), and Evolution and Creation (1926). The spiritualist element in the synthesis was most prominent in Lodge's 1916 book, Raymond, or Life and Death, which revived a large interest in the paranormal among the public.

Allan Kardec promoted a version of spiritualism, Spiritism, which combined spiritual evolution with reincarnation, popularized by French romantic socialists. Spiritism also established a peculiar relationship with the philosophy of Positivism. While Positivism rejected theological and metaphysical explanations, valuing only empirical and scientific knowledge, Kardec sought to integrate this vision with the belief in the existence of the spirit and in communication with the dead. Thus, Spiritism presented itself as a "Positive Faith", attempting to reconcile the rational and investigative method of Positivism with the belief in the immortality of the soul and in reincarnation. Kardec appropriated the scientific language of the time to give legitimacy to his doctrine, structuring it as a kind of "spiritual science" that offered evidence of life after death and promoted a reforming morality in a context of social and religious crisis in the 19th century.

In Asia, spiritualism developed students in Meiji era Japan, where the Japanese Institute for Psychical Studies formed.Chinese students studying in Japan then introduced spiritualism to China, with various institutions in the style of the Japanese Institute for Psychical Studies or the Society for Psychical Studies forming in Republican era Shanghai.

== After the 1920s ==
After the 1920s, spiritualism evolved in three different directions, all of which exist today.

=== Syncretism ===
The first of these continued the tradition of individual practitioners, organised in circles centered on a medium and clients, without any hierarchy or dogma. Already by the late 19th century spiritualism had become increasingly syncretic, a natural development in a movement without central authority or dogma. Today, among these unorganised circles, spiritualism is similar to the new age movement. However, theosophy, with its inclusion of Eastern religion, astrology, ritual magic and reincarnation, is an example of a closer precursor of the 20th-century new age movement. Today's syncretic spiritualists are quite heterogeneous in their beliefs regarding issues such as reincarnation or the existence of God. Some appropriate new age and neo-pagan beliefs, while others call themselves "Christian spiritualists", continuing with the tradition of cautiously incorporating spiritualist experiences into their Christian faith.

=== Spiritualist art ===
Spiritualism also influenced art, having a pervasive influence on artistic consciousness, with spiritualist art having a huge impact on what became modernism and therefore art today.

Spiritualism also inspired the pioneering abstract art of Vasily Kandinsky, Piet Mondrian, Kasimir Malevich, Hilma af Klint, Georgiana Houghton, and František Kupka.

=== Spiritualist church ===
The second direction taken has been to adopt formal organization, patterned after Christian denominations, with established liturgies and a set of seven principles, and training requirements for mediums. In the United States the spiritualist churches are primarily affiliated either with the National Spiritualist Association of Churches or the loosely allied group of denominations known as the spiritual church movement; in the U.K. the predominant organization is the Spiritualists' National Union, founded in 1890.

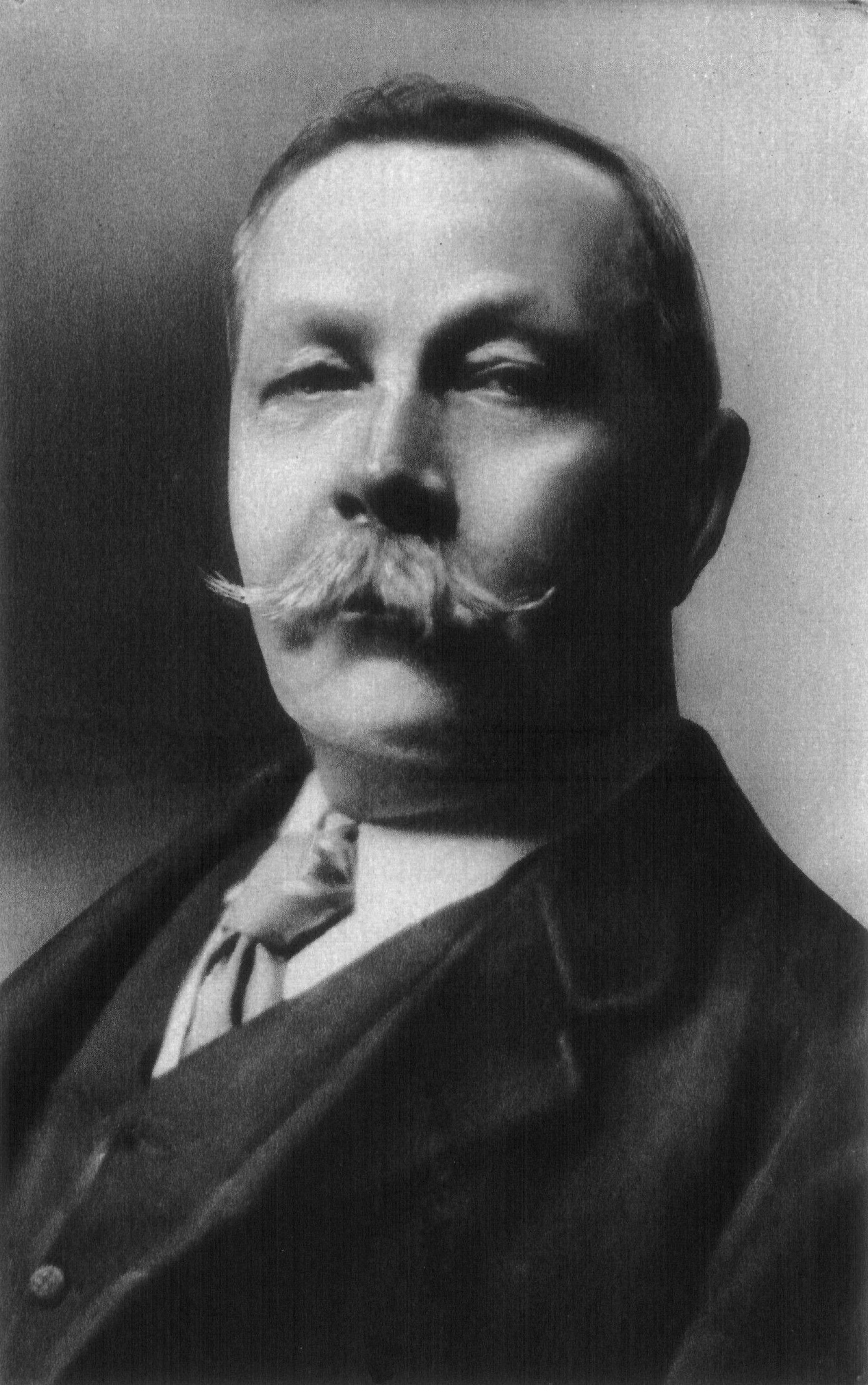
Arthur Conan Doyle, creator of Sherlock Holmes

Formal education in spiritualist practice emerged in the 1920s, with organizations like the William T. Stead Center in Chicago, Illinois, and continue today with the Arthur Findlay College at Stansted Hall in England, and the Morris Pratt Institute in Wisconsin, United States.

Diversity of belief among organized spiritualists has led to a few schisms, the most notable occurring in the U.K. in 1957 between those who held the movement to be a religion sui generis (of its own with unique characteristics), and a minority who held it to be a denomination within Christianity. In the United States, this distinction can be seen between the less Christian organization, the National Spiritualist Association of Churches, and the more Christian spiritual church movement.

The practice of organized spiritualism today resembles that of any other religion, having discarded most showmanship, particularly those elements resembling the conjurer's art. There is thus a much greater emphasis on "mental" mediumship and an almost complete avoidance of the apparently miraculous "materializing" mediumship that so fascinated early believers such as Arthur Conan Doyle.

=== Psychical research ===
Already as early as 1882, with the founding of the Society for Psychical Research (SPR), parapsychologists emerged to investigate spiritualist claims. The SPR's investigations into spiritualism exposed many fraudulent mediums which contributed to the decline of interest in physical mediumship.

== Recognition ==
Spiritualism and its belief system were affirmed as covered by the Employment Equality Regulations 2003 at the United Kingdom Employment Appeal Tribunal in 2009.

== See also ==
- Dowsing
- List of channelers
- List of spiritualist organizations
- New religious movement
- Spiritualism in fiction
- The History of Spiritualism, by Arthur Conan Doyle
