= Spiritualist church =

Church affiliated with the spiritualist movement

A spiritualist church is a church affiliated with the informal spiritualist movement which began in the United States in the 1840s. Spiritualist churches exist around the world, but are most common in English-speaking countries, while in Latin America, Central America, Caribbean and Sub-Saharan Africa, where a form of spiritualism called spiritism is more popular, meetings are held in spiritist centres, most of which are non-profit organizations rather than ecclesiastical bodies.

== History ==
The origin of mediumship is usually linked to the seances conducted by the Fox sisters at Hydesville, Arcadia, New York, in 1848, but some believers date the beginning of modern American spiritualism to the Shakers and similar religious groups. By 1853 the movement had reached San Francisco and London, and by 1860 was worldwide. The Fox family remained very active in spiritualism for many years. Other spiritualists of that era were Mercy Cadwallader, who became an advocate for the movement, and Emma Hardinge Britten, who wrote for the first spiritualist newspaper in Britain, The Yorkshire Spiritual Telegraph.

=== Great Britain ===
By the 1870s there were numerous spiritualist societies and churches throughout the US and Britain, but there was little in the way of national organization of mediums in Britain or the United States although some regions of Britain had organized Federations that might have up to thirty circles of similar beliefs. In 1891 the National Federation of Spiritualists (NFS) came into existence and grew quite large before its name change to the Spiritualists' National Union (SNU) in 1902.

British spiritualists of this time were often adherents of the temperance and anti-capital punishment lobbies, often held radical political views and were frequently vegetarians. Some were active in the advocacy of women's rights and female suffrage, and a minority espoused free love. The popular perception of spiritualists was often of radicals in the Victorian period.

Two Worlds was the major British magazine of spiritualism and had a fairly large circulation, and it advertised the existence of local circles. D.D. Home one of the most renowned mediums of his era, did much to make spiritualism fashionable among the aristocracy by his high-profile activities. Trance mediumship flourished and table-turning was a popular craze, reputedly even reaching Buckingham Palace.

By 1924 there were 309 spiritualist churches affiliated to the SNU or one of the many other organisations. In 1932, a new magazine, Psychic News, joined Two Worlds on the newsstands of Britain and carried news of the doings in local spiritualist churches.

From 1920 to 1938 there was the British College of Psychic Studies (1920 to 1947) led by Mr. and Mrs. Mackenzie in London, but more successful was the Arthur Findlay College at Stansted which continues to exist.

In 1957 spiritualist churches in Britain divided between the Spiritualists' National Union, influenced by Arthur Findlay's beliefs and holding spiritualism to be a religion, and the circles of Christian Spiritualism, who hold spiritualism to be a denomination of Christianity. Spiritualists National Union churches form the large majority and are affiliated with the Spiritualist Association of Great Britain (SAGB), which is not a church per se, but an organization for mediums. The SNU also has some member churches in other English-speaking countries. Christian Spiritualist churches are mainly affiliated with The Greater World Christian Spiritualist Association (GWCSA).

Other spiritualist groups in the UK include the White Eagle Lodge, founded by the medium Grace Cooke, the Institute of Spiritualist Mediums and the Noah's Ark Society (the NAS) whose focus was physical mediumship and the support and development of physical mediums. (The NAS was dissolved c. 2005/2006 by its founder, the late George Cranley.)

=== International ===
There are spiritualist churches in Australia, New Zealand, Canada, The Republic of South Africa, Sweden and groups in many countries including Japan, the Scandinavian countries, Korea, Italy, Germany, Austria, Hungary, The Netherlands, Belgium, Spain, Portugal and Iceland. Many such groups and also individuals, are members of the International Spiritualist Federation (ISF) which was founded in Belgium in 1923 and is an umbrella organization for all spiritualists. The ISF holds biennial congresses in different parts of the world.

In Australia, the Associated Christian Spiritual Churches of Australia (ACSCOA), International Council of Spiritualists (ICS), Church of United Spiritualism of Australia (USoA) and the Victorian Spiritualists' Union (VSU) co-exist alongside independent churches, and Canada has the Spiritualist Church of Canada (SCC) founded in 1974, along with independent churches.

=== United States ===
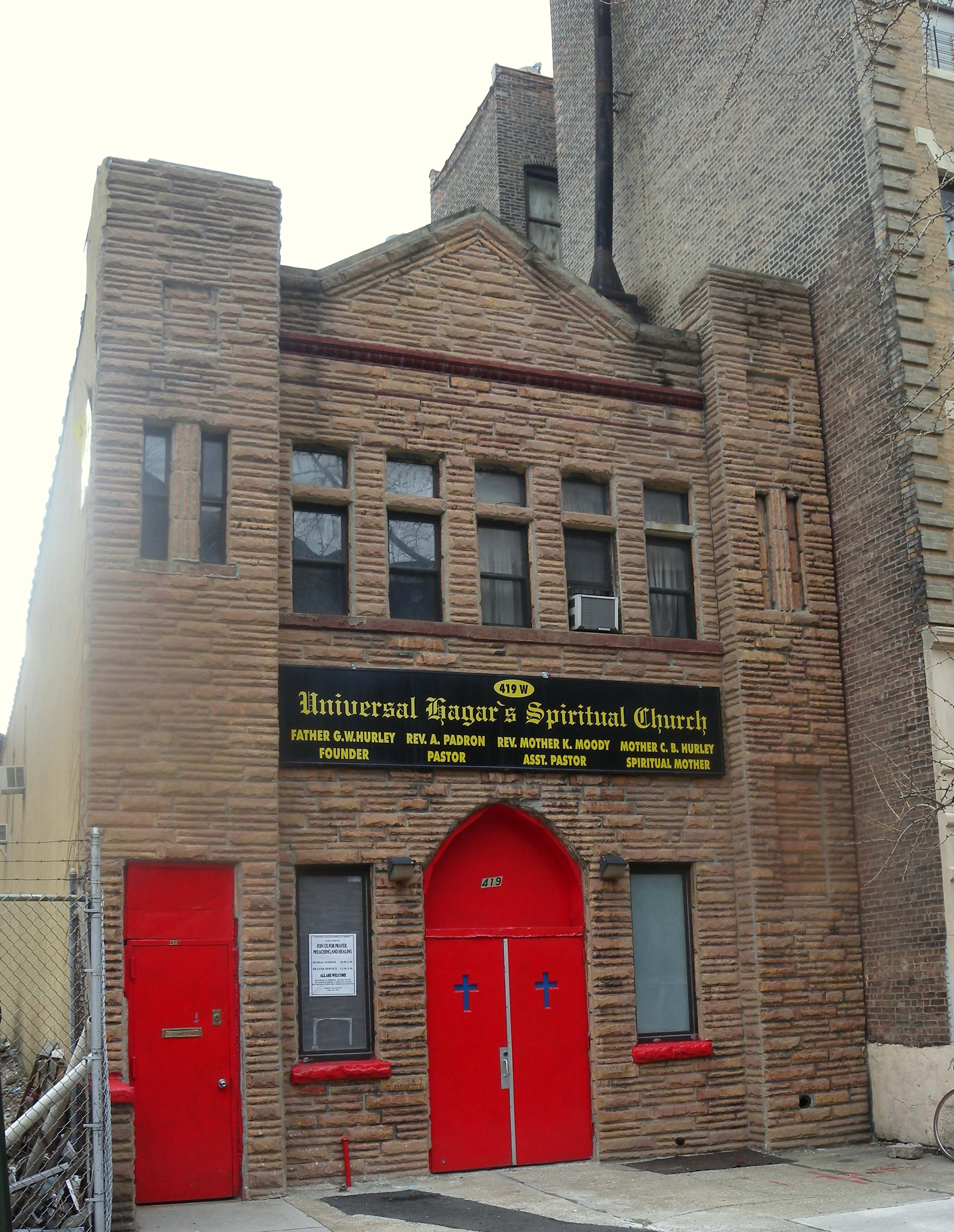
Universal Hagar's Spiritual Church, Manhattan

American spiritualism has long been more individualistic than its British counterpart. Many North American spiritualist churches are affiliated with the National Spiritualist Association of Churches (NSAC), The National Spiritual Alliance (TNSA), or the United Spiritualist Church Association (USCA), but almost as many are independent churches with no national affiliation. The Federation of Spiritual Churches and Associations (FSCA) was founded on May 25, 1944, by Rev. Vernon R. Cummins as a legal defense umbrella for autonomous Spiritualist congregations, later evolving into an ecclesiastical clearinghouse for credentialing Spiritualist ministers, mediums, and chaplains.

Spiritualist churches generally have, in addition to the church proper, an educational wing called a lyceum (the Greek word for "place of conversation"). These spiritualist lyceums function as a support system for the teaching of spiritualist history and doctrine outside of the liturgical services, and enable the booking of guest lecturers and visiting mediums.

A unique aspect of American spiritualism, which sets it apart from British church tradition, was the nineteenth century development and institutionalization of spiritualist camps, organized by urban spiritualist churches. These rural retreats, located in picturesque natural settings throughout the United States, allow spiritualist families to spend their summer vacations boating, hiking, attending spiritualist lectures, taking development classes in mediumship, and receiving messages from guest mediums. Among the best-known of the spiritualist camps are Lily Dale Assembly in Lily Dale, New York, Camp Cassadaga in Cassadaga, Florida, On-I-Set-Wigwam Spiritualist Camp in Massachusetts, Camp Chesterfield in Indiana, Sunset Spiritualist Camp in Kansas, and Wonewoc Spiritualist Camp in Wisconsin.

=== African American Spiritualist church ===
In 1922, during a time of rising Jim Crow laws and segregationism, the NSAC expelled its African American members. The Black spiritualists then formed a national organization called the Colored Spiritualist Association of Churches (CSAC), which included churches in Chicago, Detroit, Philadelphia, New York City, and elsewhere. The CSAC eventually fractured over leadership and doctrinal issues, and the historically African American spiritualist churches, since loosely referred to as the spiritual church movement, includes a variety of denominations such as the African Cultural Nationalist Universal Hagar's Spiritual Church and the protestant-Christian-oriented Pentecostal Spiritual Assemblies of Christ - International and Metropolitan Spiritual Churches of Christ. The Spiritual Churches of New Orleans are a diverse group of denominations that have separated from the denomination founded by the Wisconsin-born Mother Leafy Anderson in the early twentieth century. According to Erwan Dianteill, their theology was grounded on a very original Black feminism, and particularly on the Gospel of John:4 (the encounter of Jesus and the Samaritan woman).

Most spiritual church movement churches incorporate theological spiritualism, including the utilization of traditional "Spirit Guides" in worship services, with a mixture of protestant and Catholic iconography. The names of individual churches in these diverse denominations tend to indicate the denominational Christian orientation of their founders or their congregations. Some, such as Divine Israel Spiritual Church (in New Orleans), recall typical Black Baptist churches, others, like Divine Harmony Spiritual Church (in Knoxville, Tennessee), have names evocative of the early twentieth century New Thought movement, and some, such as Infant of Prague Spiritual Church (in New Orleans), feature Catholic names and include statuary of Catholic saints on their altars. Unlike the NSAC Spiritualist churches, the denominations of the spiritual church movement generally do not maintain spiritualist camps or a lyceum system of extra-liturgical education.

== Styles of worship ==
Spiritualist churches are places of worship for the practitioners of spiritualism. The spiritualist service is usually conducted by a medium. Generally, there is an opening prayer, an address, the singing of hymns, and finally a demonstration of mediumship. Healing circles may also be part of the formal proceedings.

=== Liturgical and iconographic variations ===
Some spiritualist churches maintain that spiritualism is a religion in its own right, and has no relationship to any other religion.

Other spiritualist churches draw inspiration from Christianity. African American spiritualist churches tend to encourage ecstatic worship styles derived from African-American Protestant Baptist and Pentecostal practices. The churches that directly descend from the teachings of Leafy Anderson are also distinguished by special services and hymns that honor the spirit of the Native American war chief Black Hawk, who lived in Illinois and Wisconsin (Anderson's home state).

A third group of spiritualist churches propose the idea of the Universe as the creator, and does not necessarily follow any specific religious doctrine or dogma.

=== Mediumship within the churches ===
Spiritualists believe that when people die physically an aspect of the personality or mind survives and continues to exist on a spirit plane, sometimes referred to as the spirit world. Spiritualists use the word spirit as a plural which describes all minds and entities who have entered into the spirit world. The purpose of the medium is to provide evidence that a human has survived by describing the person to their surviving relatives. The degree of accuracy with which the deceased are described goes some way to convincing the living relatives and friends that the medium has some contact with the spirit.

Spiritualists describe this as "survival evidence'".

There have been a number of famous practitioners of spirit communication connected to spiritualist churches. One of the principal advocates of spiritualism was the 20th century British writer Arthur Findlay. Findlay was a magistrate, farmer and businessman who left his mansion house as a place for the study and advancement of psychic science. It has become a psychic college in Stansted, England and is run by the SNU.

Mediums develop their ability by sitting regularly in development circles with other student psychics. Meditation usually plays a large role in spiritualist practice. Meditation is used to calm the "voices" of modern, hectic life so that the practitioner can better hear their guide. Meditation often includes the breathing practices of Buddhist meditation (ānāpānasati) and may also include the idea of chakras. The spiritualist may also focus on the tenets of their chosen religion to help them attain a higher existence. These may include standard prayers (Hail Mary, Shema Yisrael or salat etc.) focusing on the name of God (Jesus, YHWH or Allah etc.) or other aspects of a holy nature. Like most meditation techniques, imaging (intensely imagining a place or situation) is common. There are specific imagings used to "meet" one's guide, connect with those who have died, receive protection or support from God or simply calming the mind.

Through engaging their intuition, they attempt to contact the spirits of the dead. This is known as opening up. In Britain especially, such mediums are trained to produce clear evidence that the spirit contacted is the person they claim them to be before going on to give any "message" from the spirit. Such evidence can be details of where they lived, including addresses sometimes, particulars of illnesses suffered and notable events in their lives, often known only to the person in the congregation being given the information.

=== Healing circles within the churches ===
Spiritualist healing, as practiced in some spiritualist churches during formal liturgical services, is a form of mediumship which involves directing healing energy to the patient from a higher source. The healer uses their hands to effect repair of damaged or diseased tissue and it is claimed all or part of the patient's good health is sometimes restored.

== See also ==
- List of Spiritualist organizations
