= Spiritualism (beliefs) =

Overview of spiritualistic beliefs and practices

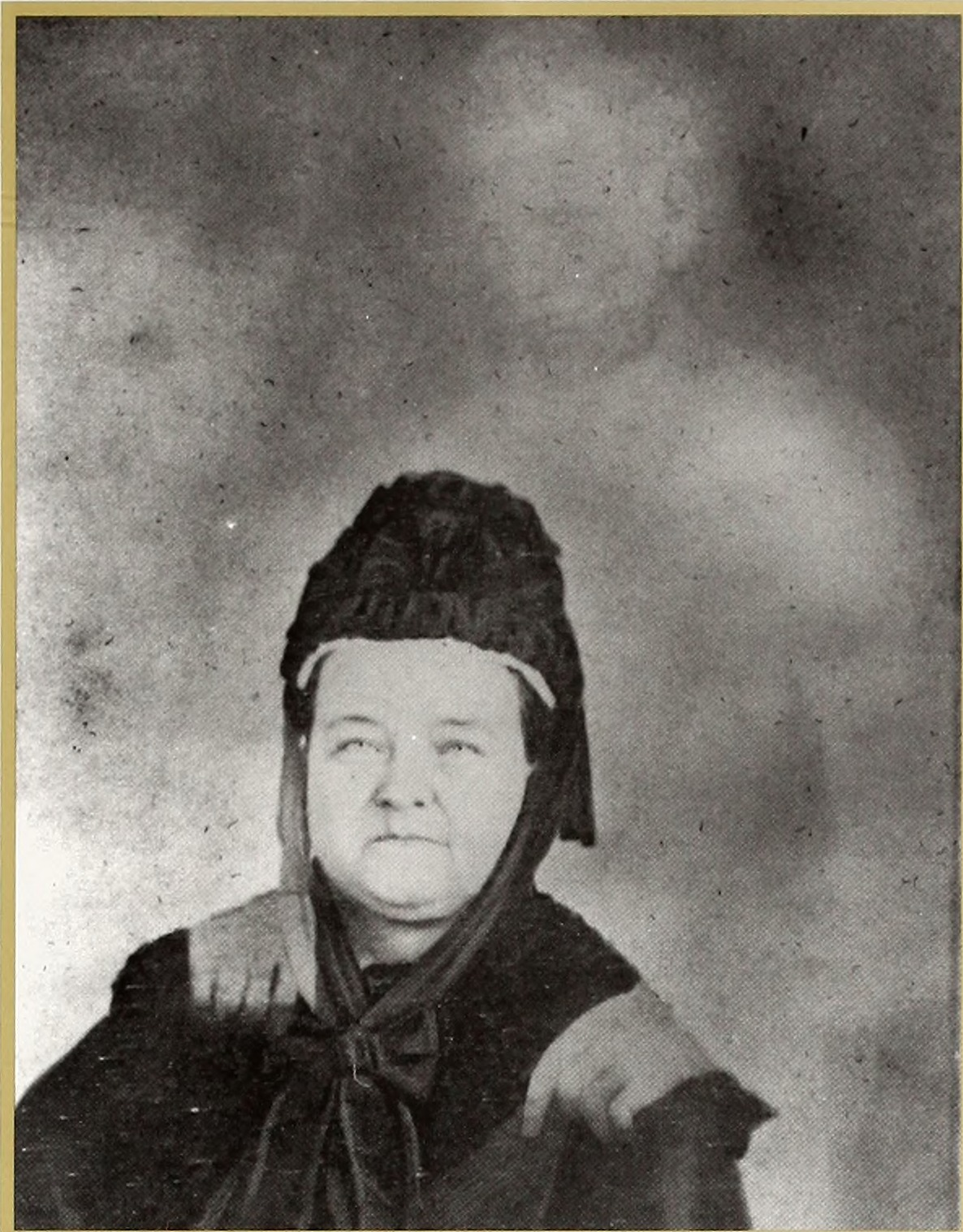
1857 ghost photograph depicting a spirit posing behind the sitter

Spiritualism is a metaphysical belief that the world is made up of at least two fundamental substances, matter and spirit. This very broad metaphysical distinction is further developed into many and various forms by the inclusion of details about what spiritual entities exist such as a soul, the afterlife, spirits of the dead, deities and mediums; as well as details about the nature of the relationship between spirit and matter. It may also refer to the philosophy, doctrine, or religion pertaining to a spiritual aspect of existence.

It is also a term commonly used for various psychic or paranormal practices and beliefs recorded throughout humanity's history and in a variety of cultures.

Spiritualistic traditions appear deeply rooted in shamanism and perhaps are one of the oldest forms of religion. Mediumship is a modern form of shamanism and such ideas are very much like those developed by Edward Burnett Tylor in his theory of animism; in which there are other parallel worlds to our own, though invisible to us and not accessible to us in our state. A psychic is to be one of the connecting links between these worlds. A psychic is defined as someone endowed with exceptional sensitivity to the occult dimension, who experiences visions and revelations. Some authors have stated only few individuals are said to have this capacity.

== Definition ==
Spiritualism is the belief that spirits are able to communicate with the living by agency of a medium. The earliest recorded use of the word is 1796 and it was used by the prominent 18th-century spiritualist Emanuel Swedenborg. The term "spiritualism" has come to have different meanings. A broad working definition of the term would include the multi-faceted belief in a vital principle within living beings, a supernatural or paranormal, divine, incorporeal being – force, spirit – anima animating bodies etc. Adherents of spiritualistic movements believe that the spirits of the dead survive mortal life, and that sentient beings from spiritual worlds can and do communicate with the living. Since ancient times, this has been an element in traditional indigenous religions. In today's world, it is a growing phenomenon manifesting itself in traditional indigenous religiosity on all continents through non-aligned spiritualistic groups and many syncretistic movements and within elements of orthodox religions by which it is still seen as a challenge.

Many reference works also use the term spiritism to mean the same thing as "spiritualism" but Spiritism is more accurately used to mean Kardecist spiritism. Central to adherents' faith is a belief that spirits of the dead communicate with the living usually through a medium.

The word also takes on specific alternative meanings in various differing fields of academia, see below.

== Usage ==
Spiritualism is used in English to mean either:

1. (Religion) – the belief that people can and do communicate with dead people and the practices and doctrines of people with this belief.
1. (Philosophy) – In a philosophical doctrine or religious beliefs emphasising that spirits and souls exist or that all reality is spiritual, not material.
2. (Metaphysics) – various doctrines maintaining that the ultimate reality is spirit or mind.
1. (Ethics) – the view that spiritual concerns are more important than this-worldly concerns (a kind of idealism or asceticism that is opposed to secularism).
1. (Epistemology) – another term for mysticism.
1. (Art) – "Abstract Spiritualism", a term coined by Gerard Tempest, friend of the renowned surrealist Giorgio de Chirico in the 1950s to describe his "landscapes of the mind's eye." A recurring theme begun in 1953 and continuing throughout the 1990s.

== Beliefs ==
=== Modern Spiritualism ===
"Modern Spiritualism", or "Modern American Spiritualism" is used to refer to an Anglo-American religious movement having its golden age between the 1840s and 1920s but which continues on to this day.

==== National Spiritualist Association of Churches, USA ====
The Nine Principles of the National Spiritualist Association of Churches, USA are;

1. We believe in Infinite Intelligence.
2. We believe that the phenomena of Nature, both physical and spiritual, are the expression of Infinite Intelligence.
3. We affirm that a correct understanding of such expression and living in accordance therewith, constitute true religion.
4. We affirm that the existence and personal identity of the individual continue after the change called death.
5. We affirm that communication with the so-called dead is a fact, scientifically proven by the phenomena of Spiritualism.
6. We believe that the highest morality is contained in the Golden Rule: "Do unto others as you would have them do unto you."
7. We affirm the moral responsibility of individuals, and that we make our own happiness or unhappiness as we obey or disobey Nature's physical and spiritual laws.
8. We affirm that the doorway to reformation is never closed against any soul here or hereafter.
9. We affirm that the precepts of Prophecy and Healing are Divine attributes proven through Mediumship.

=== Christian Spiritualism ===
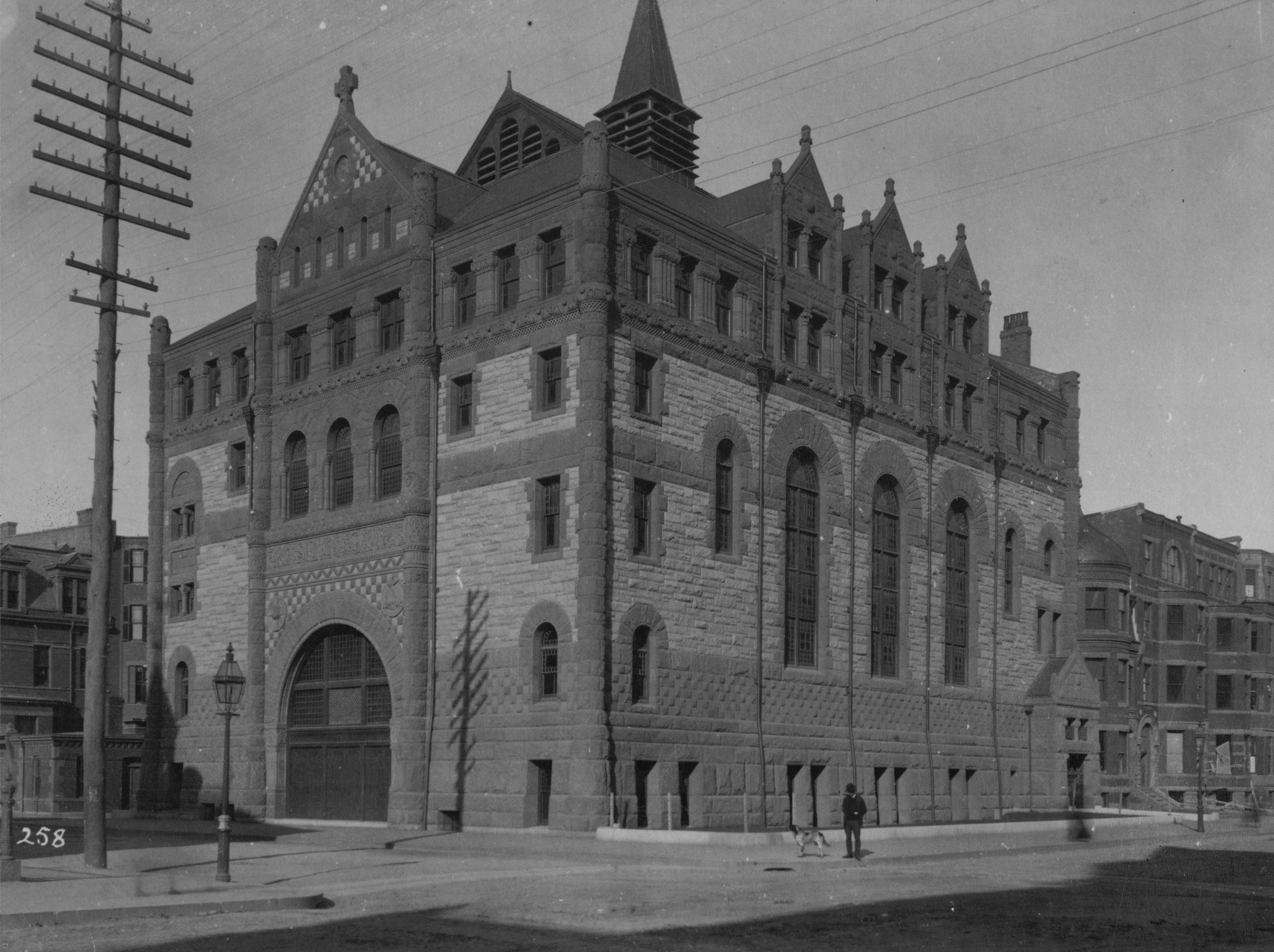
First Spiritual Temple, Boston, Massachusetts, albumen print, c. 1885–1895

Spiritualism has been related to the practices of early Christianity and has developed into an additional form of Christian Spiritualism, e.g. the still active First Spiritual Temple in the US founded in 1883 and the Greater World Christian Spiritualist League (later to become the Greater World Christian Spiritualist Association) in the UK which was founded in 1931.

Foremost in the movement towards Christian Spiritualism in the United Kingdom was one of the leading pioneers in the spiritualism movement, medium and Reverend William Stainton Moses. He was a member of the BNAS (British National Association of Spiritualists), vice-president of the Society for Psychic Research and launched the London Spiritualist Alliance which later became the College of Psychic Studies.

Contemporary Christian Spiritualist denominations also include those within the American Spiritual Church Movement pioneered by Leafy Anderson, such as the Metropolitan Spiritual Churches of Christ, founded in 1925, Pentecostal Spiritual Assemblies of Christ Worldwide, founded in 1938, whose motto is "Pentecostal by Birth, Spiritual by Lifestyle, Apostolic by Experience, and Christian by Demand. A Spiritual Church... On a Spiritual Foundation... Walking in the Supernatural...," and Universal Hagar's Spiritual Church, founded in the 1920s.

=== France Pre-1848 ===
French spiritualism, better known as Spiritism; popular throughout France and Latin American countries. Its foremost researcher and author is Allan Kardec.

Spiritualist beliefs are found from time to time in the early literature of the French "magnetists". As early as 1787 M. Tardy de Montravel wrote that in the trance the soul of the "somnambule" became freed from its body and was able to intercourse with other spirits. Dr G.P. Billot, and J. P. F. Deleuze and recorded discussing and documenting seances from the 1820s.

The early French Spiritualist, Alphonse Cahagnet, publisher of spirit messages such as "Arcanes de la vie future devoiles" (1848), is one of its foremost cases. Familiar with the teachings of Swedenborg, and with an interest evoked by contemporary German clairvoyants, in the Paris of his day, Cahagnet stood almost alone, belonging to no school. For the advent of Modern Spiritualism in America, Cahagnet would have found but few readers, although his documentation of his work with the medium Adele Maginot was at once amongst the most remarkable and the best-attested documents on which the early case for Spiritualism depended.

=== Native American spiritualism ===
Representations of Native Americans images have played a significant role in nineteenth and twentieth century spiritualism although in reality Natives and their tradition have suffered considerably under the influences of competing Christian churches. Since 1970, there have been a number of individuals purporting to sell Native American spiritualism, sometimes called '"American Indian Spiritualism." The spread of these beliefs began with a number of literary hoaxes undertaken by non-Indians such as Carlos Castaneda and Jamake Highwater. Several Native Americans have also sought to exploit interest in Native American spiritualism, writing distortions of indigenous spiritual practices and knowledge for consumption in the mass market. This situation has been attacked by legitimate Indian scholars and by activists such as the American Indian Movement, Survival of American Indians and the late Gerald Wilkenson, head of the National Indian Youth Council.

=== The Caribbean ===
Spiritualism in the Caribbean has taken different roads of expression based on its contact with other religious systems. In urban areas, for example, Spiritualists were highly literate and more apt to indulge the concepts of foreign authors. In the rural areas, however, illiteracy was widespread and practitioners held a diverse array of beliefs and practices.

In Cuba, for instance, two fundamental variants of espiritism exist:

- La Mesa Blanca Spiritualism is highly colonialized, meaning the European influence is quite evident. Catholicism, Native and African meld together into a syncretic belief system. This variant is designated by the use of La Mesa Blanca or "White Table".
- Egungun Spiritualism has strong Kongo–Bantu roots. Elements from Lucumi/Regla de Ocha are evident. This type of practice, designated by the use of chants and dancing (performed by the mediums) in a line or chain to the beat of songs, hymns and invocations that ultimately lead to a state of trance or possession by the Spirit, is seen in rural areas and in the province of Santiago.

La Mesa Blanca Spiritualism is the type of Espiritismo that made its way to US. The old line Eggungun form of service has not made much headway on the mainland. Séances, in Latino cultures, are called misas. Santería, more properly called La Regla Lucumi (as the Yoruba were called in Cuba) is famous for its magic based on a knowledge of spirits and how to interact with them.

=== South America ===
Definitions of spirit possession, channelling and mediumship within the Brazilian 'cultos' is recognised to correspond with what appears to be the majority view as described by ethnographers of spirit possession worldwide. There are a number of descriptions available concerning what happens when someone becomes possessed. Practises brought over by African slaves from West Africa, Mixed with indigenous South American tradition to develop their own flavour. During the suppression of Culto Omoloco or Umbanda by the Roman Catholic Church a period of syncretism commenced that included the introduction of images of the saints present in the churches presenting a new look for repressors behind which the Africans worshipped their gods and ancestors. This process of merger continued with the introduction of Kardecist spiritism and includes spiritualists.

Use of Spirit Entities
Afro	Brazilian	Origin	Line/Tradition
Orixá		Yoruba	Candomblé Nagô
Vodun		Dahomey	Candomblé Jeje
	Vodunsu, Encantado	Europe, Middle East	Mina
	Caboclo Indigenous	Amazonian	Mina, healing and consultation
	Animal Spirits	Indigenous Amazonian	Curing

From: 'Channellers, Cowries and Conversations with the Gods: explaining multiple divination methods in an Afro-Brazilian religious tradition'.

In Puerto Rico, trance mediums feature in is spiritism and in Cuba, syncretic spiritualistic practises similar to Santería are called Santerfa and enjoy an estimated five million Hispanic American followers.

=== India ===
Spiritualism is also practised within India in both modern and ancient forms involving contacting the spirits, knowledge and wisdom of ancestors who are then worshiped for generations. Spirituality in general is seen as a process of learning the secrets of the world beneath and outside to gain inner peace. It is prevalent in both the North and the South, and across caste divides by way of ritual, and exists in a variety of mediumship cults.

In india there are many religious groups which are following spirituality at it best. India is known for his ancient traditions and cultures.

In 'A Tale of goddesses, money, and other terribly wonderful things: spirit possession, commodity fetishism, and the narrative of capitalism in Rajasthan', anthropologist J.G. Snodgrass explores the use of spiritualism amongst Rajasthani performing communities arguing for an appreciation of the way religious forms, and particularly the use of spiritual possessions, represent a form of language. Rajasthanis are possessed by a range of spiritual entities. Some of these are judged good and beneficial, some evil.

Trance mediumship and channelling are also practised by the unrelated new religious movement called, the Brahma Kumaris who have their headquarters in the state.

=== Eastern Asia ===
Noted as early as 1850 by J. R. Logan in the Journal of the Indian Archipelago IV. 552 who illustrated the different forms of spiritualism which prevailed in Eastern Asia at that time". Henry Olcott of the Theosophical Society went to length to draw correlations between Eastern spiritualistic practises and Modern Spiritualism.

=== China ===
Hsien-t'ien Tao sects claim to represent a way (Tao) that transcends and unites all other religions. Explicit syncretism is a noticeable feature of these groups who claim that their teachings aim to unify the "Three Religions" (Confucianism, Taoism, Buddhism), the "Five Religions" or even the former three plus Christianity and Islam. Most Hsien-tien Tao groups rely heavily on spirit-writing as a means of communicating with "the Mother" as well as lower-ranking deities. Amongst practitioners, the T'zu-hui Tang differ from the other Hsien-t'ien Tao sects, which were all originally based in mainland China, in that it originated in Taiwan in post-World War II years. It was founded in 1949, when the "Golden Mother of the Jasper Pool" revealed herself through a medium in the northeastern Taiwanese city of Hualien. The cults influence reaches to Malaysia.

In the late nineteenth century, a growing number of Western and Japanese sinologists believed that something akin Western mesmerism, planchette and spiritualism had existed in China long before emerging in the West.

Early twentieth-century Chinese psychical researchers used the theories of hypnosis and suggestion as a framework through which to clarify the scientific rationale underlying the efficacy of such healing methods as talismans, meditation, spirit-writing, acupuncture and daoyin.

=== Japan ===
In Japan, spirit mediums are called Reibai. Although the primary religion of Japan, Shintoism is essentially animistic, relating to Kami, or spirits, psychical research typical of the West was introduced to Japan by Wasaburou Asano (1874–1937). Wasaburou established the Society for Spiritual Science Research in Japan and is recognized as creating modern Japanese Spiritualism. His successor Takeo Waki further developing the movement. Later Hiroyoshi Kuwahara created Neo Spiritualism which combined Japanese Spiritualism with the content of British spirit messages.

Japan Psychic Science Association (JPSA) was started in December 1946 promotes spiritualism and conducts psychical research. It provides members with the opportunities for psychic readings and healings and promotes scientific research by a team of scientists and engineers.

Recently widespread popular interest was inspired by Hiroyuki Ehara, a self-professed spiritual counselor who hosts a weekly television show Aura no Izumi where he looks into celebrities' past lives and reads their "auras". Spiritual reading are known as Seishin Touitshuka. Other notable spiritualists include, Fukurai Tomokichi (1869–1952) Japanese pioneer of parapsychology, Mifune Chizuko (1886–1911), a clairvoyant. Mita Koichi (1885–1943), a psychic and Deguchi Onisaburo (1871–1948) Leader of Ohmoto, a Japanese Shinto sect who practised channelling known as Chinkon-kijin. Japan also has its own traditional form or table turning or ouija called kokkuri and spirits beings are called yokai in its folklore.

Other Japanese religious leaders claiming to channel spirits include Ryuho Okawa of the Japanese new religious movement Kofuku-no-Kagaku, or Happy Science, who claims to channeled the spirits of Muhammad, Christ, Buddha, and Confucius.

=== Pacific islands ===
In Samoa, Java, Tonga etc. distinctions are made between god-like and spirit-like beings, with gods representing the moral order and spirits dealing with periphery issues, both through channelling, mediumship and possession. Authors note the susceptibility of missionaries in Samoa to local spirits, remembering that spirits were a significant feature of the Victorian milieu through the revival of Spiritualism.

In Micronesia, recently deceased kin often appear as spirit visitors and possess female relatives in order to provide comfort and guidance. Identically to Anglo-American practises, they deliver important messages from beyond the grave. These spirits are fully sentient beings who retain social and emotional ties with their earthly homes and families. They occupy a liminal space between this world and the afterlife.

During this liminal period, spirits must learn how to "be dead", while the living struggle to reconcile themselves to the corporeal death and new spiritual life of the departed. Spirit possession and other forms of spirit communication, including the popular use of ouija boards, help to facilitate the process of "becoming dead" on both sides of the cosmological divide. Spiritualistic practices play an important role in helping individuals to understand death as a journey when it is also marked by social rupture and the problems of grief and attachment.

=== The Antipodes ===
In Australia, Aborigine tribes in Victoria called spirits Mrarts, understood to be the souls of "Black Fellows dead and gone", not demons unattached. The mediums, now very scarce, are Birraarks who were consulted as to matters present and future, whose practises include the 'spirit-rapping' known to the Modern Spiritualists and whistles, heard in certain Brazilian séances. The Māoris' specialty was 'trance utterance', the Tohungas being mediums.

=== Africa ===
West-African Kongol and Bantu tradition is generally referred to as Vodun (or anglicised to Voodoo). Spirit mediumship and spirit possession are fairly common practices in Sub-Saharan Africa, both in traditional religions and in Christian contexts. As is the norm, the term spiritualism and spiritism are used generally and interchangeably to describe indigenous spiritualistic practises. Spiritism, spiritualism, and spiritual churches have been established in Ghana and Nigeria. Following similar trends of the syncretism of traditional spirit worship and Christianity, they pervade everyday life to the top of society where they play a part in politic elections, ritualizing to help politicians win elections and interpreting events in prophetic terms and are used in healing.

Kubandwa is a spirit possession cult spread all over the Great Lakes region of Africa (Rwanda, Burundi, north-western Tanzania, Uganda, Eastern Congo) past women have played an important role in kubandwa, both as mediums and spirits. Tromba mediumship features in Madagascar.

=== Islam ===
Spiritualism is practised but not condoned in Islamic societies. The Sufi sect of Dervishes are referred to as "Eastern Spiritualists". Likewise, the Zār cult of North Africa (Sudan, Egypt) and the Middle East (Iran).

== Spiritualistic activities ==
The phenomena of spiritualism consist of: prophecy, clairvoyance, clairaudience, gift of tongues, laying on of hands, healing, visions, trance, apports, revelations, raps, levitation, automatic and independent writing and painting, photography, materialization, psychometry, direct and independent voice, and any other manifestation lending support to the continuity of life after death.

Such universal practises and the giving of spiritual guidance, the different manifestations of spiritualistic activities were categorised by Sir William Crookes, a highly distinguished British physicist and chemist, as being:

- The movement of heavy bodies with contact, but without mechanical exertion
- The phenomena of percussive and other allied sounds
- The alteration of weights of bodies
- Movements of heavy substances when at a distance from the medium
- The rising of tables and chairs off the ground, without contact with any person
- The levitation of human beings
- Movement of various small articles without contact with any person
- Luminous appearances
- The appearance of hands, either self-luminous or visible by ordinary light
- Direct (automatic) writing
- Phantom forms and faces
- Special instances which seem to point to the agency of an exterior intelligence
- Miscellaneous occurrences of a complex character.

== Gender balance ==
Women have historically had a fairly constant interest in the spirit world. Spiritualism's current popularity in the West is a result of women having more power and visibility, giving the spirit world a prominence in society that it previously had only during spiritualism's "boom" periods when men became interested.

Historically, the majority of mediums for tromba spirits amongst the Sakalava have also been adult women, usually in their forties or older and is likewise associated with female status. In general, a Sakalava ritual in which the spirits must be fed, cannot be performed if the two are not present and represented.

== Notable individuals ==
=== Emanuel Swedenborg (1688–1772) ===
A Swedish scientist, philosopher, politician and theologian. Widely recognized as the "Father of Modern Spiritualism" but practicing before the movement started. A clairvoyant medium who used his spiritualist gifts for the royalty of Sweden.

=== Allan Kardec (1804–1869) ===
Developed the 19th-century spiritualist philosophical doctrine of Spiritism, popular in Francophone and Latin nations.

=== Edward Burnett Tylor (1832–1917) ===
Anthropologist, introduced the term animism.

=== Joseph Campbell (1904–1987) ===
American 20th-century mythology professor and author best known for his work in the fields of comparative religion.

=== Carl Jung (1875–1961) ===
Carl Jung's doctoral dissertation was not medical research but the investigation of a medium, his maternal cousin, Hélène Preiswerk. The spiritualist narrative in Jung's personal life reached a climax in 1916 when he became convinced that his house was crammed with spirits. He practised a typically mediumistic activity of ‘spirit-directed' writing.

== See also ==
- Necromancy
- Spiritual materialism
- Spirituality
