= Clarence H. Cobbs =

American spiritualist clergyman and broadcaster

- Born: Clarence Henry Cobbs; February 29, 1908; Memphis, Tennessee
- Died: June 28, 1979 (aged 71); Chicago, Illinois
- Resting place: Oak Woods Cemetery
- Occupation(s): Clergyman, broadcaster
- Organization: First Church of Deliverance

Clarence Henry Cobbs (February 29, 1908 – June 28, 1979) was an African-American spiritualist clergyman and broadcaster, the leader of the First Church of Deliverance in Chicago.

== Early life ==
Clarence H. Cobbs was born in Memphis, Tennessee, on February 29, 1908. He attended Kortrecht High School, where his teachers included hymnwriter Lucie Campbell. He moved to Chicago in 1916, becoming a member of the Pilgrim Baptist Church. In the late 1920s, he met and was influenced by spiritualist medium "Mother" Della Hedgepath.

== The First Church of Deliverance ==
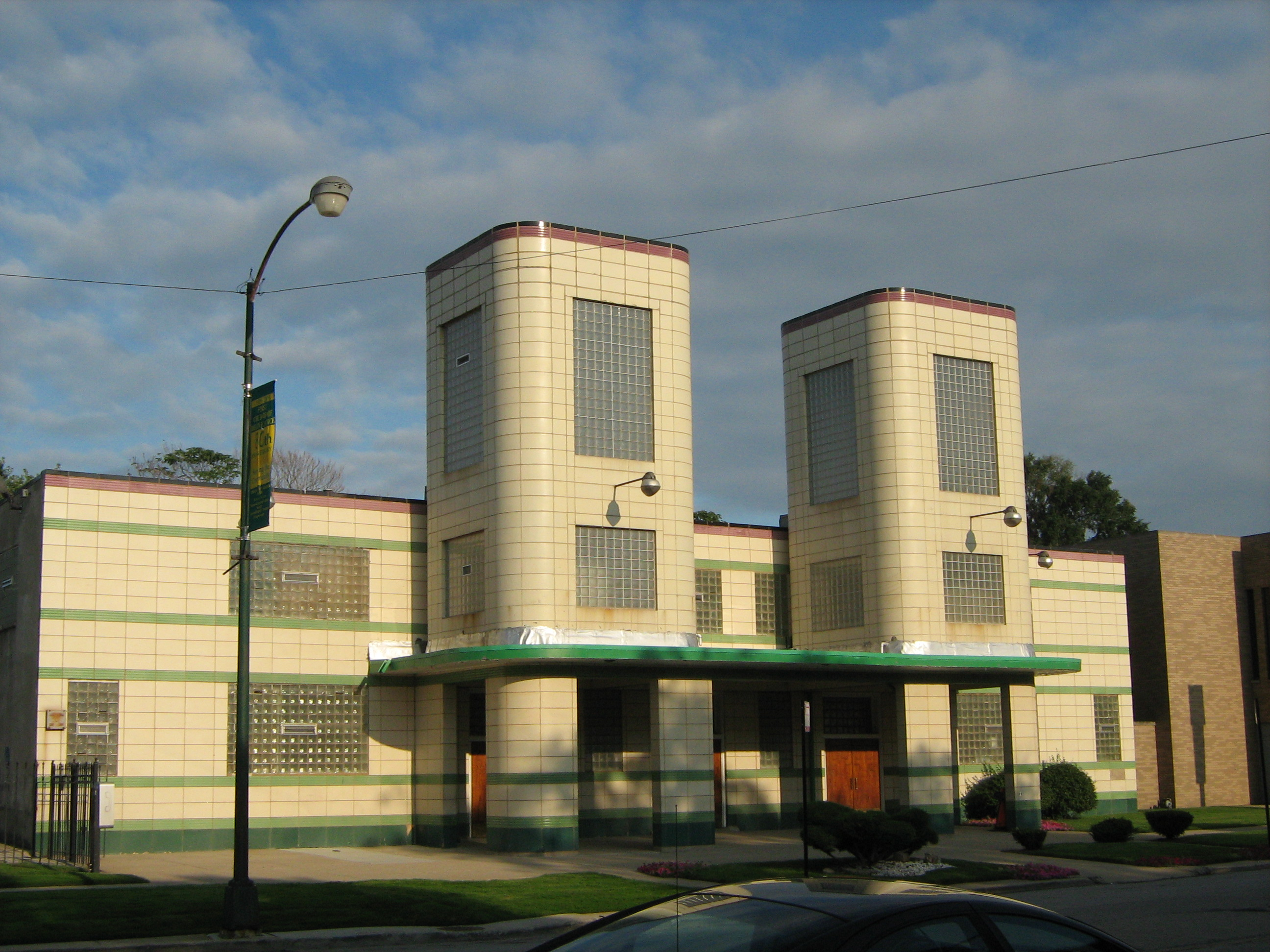
The First Church of Deliverance

After Hedgepath's death, Cobbs founded his own congregation, the First Church of Deliverance. It initially met at his mother's residence, and moved to a storefront at 4155 South State Street in May 1929. It moved again in 1930, to 4633 South State Street, and to a brick building at 4315 South Wabash Avenue in 1933.

Nicknamed "Preacher", Cobbs became known for his fashionable clothes, informal manner, and stirring performances with the church's 200-member choir. They appeared before large crowds in Comiskey Park, and began broadcasting services on radio station WSBC in 1935. The hour-long "Midnight Broadcast" pioneered a format which was followed by many subsequent religious programs.

In 1939, the church moved into a large new building designed by Walter T. Bailey at its Wabash Avenue site. That same year, composer Kenneth Morris prevailed on Cobbs to install a Hammond organ, giving the choir's music a distinctive sound. Morris recalled,

I wanted nothing else. It sold itself. Reverend Clarence Cobbs was only too happy to get it because it did what he wanted [since] he wanted to use it for gospel purposes. It was the most unusual thing you ever heard. People came from all over just to hear me play that organ.

By the early 1940s, the congregation had over 9,000 members. It affiliated with the Metropolitan Spiritual Churches of Christ (MSCC). After the death of Bishop William F. Taylor in 1945, Cobbs became the head of one of two successor segments, the Metropolitan Spiritual Churches of Christ, Incorporated. This would grow to include 130 churches, including ones in Ghana, Jamaica, and Liberia.

In 1953, the Church of Deliverance became the first black church in the country to televise its services, which were carried on WLS-TV for 12 weeks.

== Personal life ==
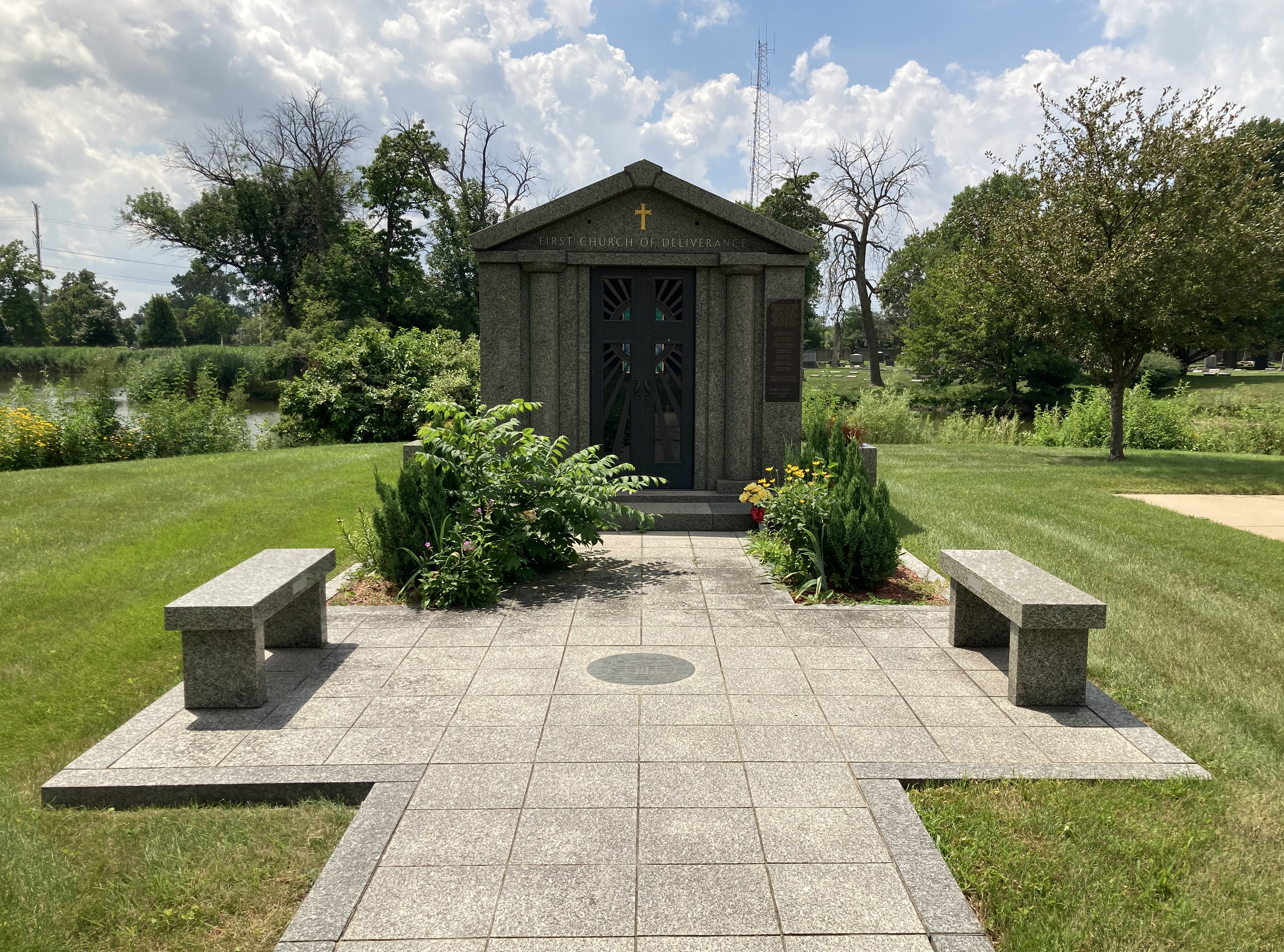
First Church of Deliverance mausoleum at Oak Woods Cemetery

Though he never publicly discussed his orientation, it was rumored among churchgoers and Bronzeville residents that Cobbs was homosexual. The First Church of Deliverance became known as a welcoming place for gay black Chicagoans, and Cobbs made no effort to hide annual vacations he took with his male secretary R. Edward Bolden. When articles in The Chicago Defender indicated that he was "facing the possibility of questioning by state's attorney's police concerning widespread rumors of a scandalous nature", Cobbs stated that he was a "full man", and filed a defamation suit against the paper.

Cobbs was a member of the executive committee of the NAACP's Chicago chapter. During racial tensions around fair housing protests, he invited civil rights leader Archibald Carey to speak on his radio program to counsel against violence and promote acceptance.

Clarence H. Cobbs died at his home in Chicago on June 28, 1979. He is interred in Oak Woods Cemetery.

== Legacy ==
The First Church of Deliverance published music for gospel composers such as Dave Carl Weston. Doris Akers credited one of Cobbs' radio sermons for inspiring her 1951 song "My Expectation", and songwriters Thurston G. Frazier and Cora Martin also dedicated works to him. Cobbs supported singer Billy Williams in the years before the latter's death in 1972, and paid for his funeral services and burial.

Cobbs' hour-long radio broadcasts pioneered a format which was followed by many subsequent religious programs.

The First Church of Deliverance building was designated a Chicago Landmark on October 5, 1994.
