= Catherine Seals =

Mother Catherine Seals
- Church: Temple of Innocent Blood
- In office: 1922–1930
- Successor: Mother Rita

Personal details
- Born: Nanny Cowans c.1874
- Died: August 12, 1930 (aged 55–56) Lexington, Kentucky, U.S.
- Denomination: Spiritualist
- Residence: 9th Ward of New Orleans

Mother Catherine Seals (c. 1874 – August 12, 1930) was an American religious leader and faith healer based in New Orleans. During the Spiritualist/Spiritual Movement of the 1920s, she led one of the largest congregations. She founded the Temple of the Innocent Blood, "one of the largest African American religious organizations of the early twentieth century," in what is now the Lower Ninth Ward. She is known for having ministered to an interracial congregation. Her work was documented by Zora Neale Hurston and Edward Larocque Tinker.

== Early life ==
Nanny (or Nanie) Cowans was born in Hustonville, Kentucky in the approximate period 1874 to 1887. She was raised by her father, Bill Cowans, and step-mother, Sue Cowans in Lexington. She moved to New Orleans when she was around 16 and married for the first time at 17. She married a total of three times. By 1920 she was married to George Jenkins, a man ten years older than her, was known as Catherine Jenkins, and was working as a cook. She had at least two children.

According to most sources for her life, George Jenkins was an alcoholic. An obituary in Time magazine notes that she remonstrated with her third husband for his philandering. He kicked her in the stomach. The kick caused a partial paralysis." She went to a local houseboat-based faith healer, John Cudney, known as Brother Isaiah. After hours of waiting, Brother Isaiah denied her due to her race. She eventually found her way to Mother Leafy Anderson, the founder of the Black Spiritual Movement. In Catherine's own pleas to God, she pled that if God cured her, she would heal others, regardless of race. She changed her name to Mother Catherine Seals (or Seal).

== Temple of Innocent Blood and the Manger ==
Mother Catharine prayed at Mother Anderson's Eternal Life Christian Spiritualist Church on Amelia Street. She took "developing classes" with Mother Anderson, learning mediumship, prophecy, and healing. A classmate noted that Catherine wore a loose-fitting blouse with a red collar one day, which was forbidden. A misunderstanding resulted in Mother Catherine leaving the Church.

Mother Catherine began ministering from her home on Jackson Avenue. She believed that women made better leaders, and she gained thousands of black and white followers. She built a following among the Italian immigrant community. Her work focused on caring for unmarried pregnant women. Zora Neale Hurston described childbirth as, "the most important element of her creed," and a white follower said that the church "was originally founded to stop abortions." As is common in Spiritual churches, her theology drew from Catholicism, though it also focused on Mother Catherine as a prophetic intermediary. For example, Mother Catherine named the children after saints. The church prayed to the image of a Black Jesus. Haitian Vodou practice was also included– a 1928 visit to the Temple of Innocent Blood, Zora Neale Hurston noted a snake motif on the wall, which may have represented Damballa, a Haitian Vodou deity. Mother Catherine played the trombone, and embraced Anderson's use of Black New Orleans music in worship. A racially mixed choir sang and a ten-piece orchestra played. The orchestra included jazz musicians Cag Cagnolatti, Harold Dejan, and Frank Lastie all played at the Temple of Innocent Blood.

By 1922, she had acquired the property that became the Temple of Innocent Blood. In a trance, she had seen that this location was Jesus's true birthplace, leading her to name the area "the Manger." She claimed that the Manger was connected to Bethlehem. Like the Biblical city, the Temple was difficult to access, requiring people to trudge through knee-deep mud to see her. Through the 1920s, she acquired at least 11 city lots in what is now the Lower Ninth Ward. The Manger included a chapel and space where Mother Catherine lived.

The property included a complex of wooden huts housing single mothers and their illegitimate children. It may have also housed orphans and tubercular patients. No men lived in the complex. Although Mother Catherine was not a midwife, some children were born at the complex. Legally, Mother Catherine could not provide interracial shelter, due to Jim Crow laws, but she still sheltered both black and white children. Census records show that Mother Catherine had adopted some of the children. The building that had been meant to serve as an orphanage burnt down, possibly due to arson.

During one healing session, Mother Catherine discussed the challenges of being illiterate. She was adamant about the education of her school-aged charges. Children were also involved in the ministry. Some were acolytes, who helped direct visitors, while others served in prophecy or healing.

Mother Catherine was known for her healing powers, using simple ingredients like castor oil and Epsom salts in her practice. She hoped to create a hospital on Manger property, the "Innocent Blood Home." She wore a white headdress and a starched apron with the word "MOTHER" embroidered on its bib in red.

== Death and legacy ==
In August 1930, Mother Catherine "had the 'miseries.'" She felt drawn home to Kentucky and traveled back, where she died on August 12, 1930. Due to the concerns of local health officials, her body was not returned to New Orleans to be buried. Her funeral was attended by thousands and was followed by a procession through the streets, in an early jazz funeral. Time Magazine covered her funeral.

After Mother Catherine's death, the city of New Orleans tried to auction the Temple and Manger. Mother Rita, Mother Catherine's successor, claimed that if the building were sold, "the entire city of New Orleans would be destroyed by flood 'so quickly that no one would have time to speak.'" Ultimately, Mother Catherine's dictated will, signed with an "X," may have been found legal, though some sources claim that the building and its contents were auctioned. Churches inspired by her keep her picture on their altars. Folklore claims that the spirit of Mother Catherine periodically appears to women who carry on their work.

Much of what is known about Mother Catherine's life comes from field interviews conducted by the Louisiana Writers' Project as part of the Federal Works Progress Administration.
