= Leafy Anderson =

American spiritualist (1887–1927)

Mother Leafy Anderson (1887–1927) was an American spiritualist born in Wisconsin in the 19th century. She was a spiritualist who claimed her mediumship included contact with the spirit of the Native American war chief Black Hawk, who had lived in Illinois and Wisconsin, Anderson's home state.

Some reports say Anderson was born in Balboa, Wisconsin in 1887. Records vary as to her marital status.

In 1913, Anderson founded the Eternal Life Spiritualist Church in Chicago. In 1919, she moved to New Orleans. Some believe that she also established churches in St. Louis, New Jersey, and Indiana Anderson was the founder of the Spiritual Church Movement in New Orleans, Louisiana in the 1920s, a loose confederation of churches largely based in the African American community. The church she founded in New Orleans featured traditional "spirit guides" in worship services, with a mixture of Protestant and Catholic Christian iconography, as well as special services and hymns intended to honor the spirit of the Sauk leader Black Hawk. Eleven congregations grew out of the original church, with locations in Memphis, Little Rock, and Pensacola.

After Anderson's death, her successor, Mother Catherine Seals, led the church, The Temple of the Innocent Blood, until her death, at which point it fractured, giving rise to a multiplicity of Spiritualist denominations in New Orleans and elsewhere.

These denominations, along with a number of similar but independent spiritualist churches across America, are known as the "spiritual church movement."

== See also ==
- Spiritualism
- Spiritualist Church
- List of Spiritualist organizations
