= First Church of Deliverance =

Coordinates: 41.8163°N 87.6243°W

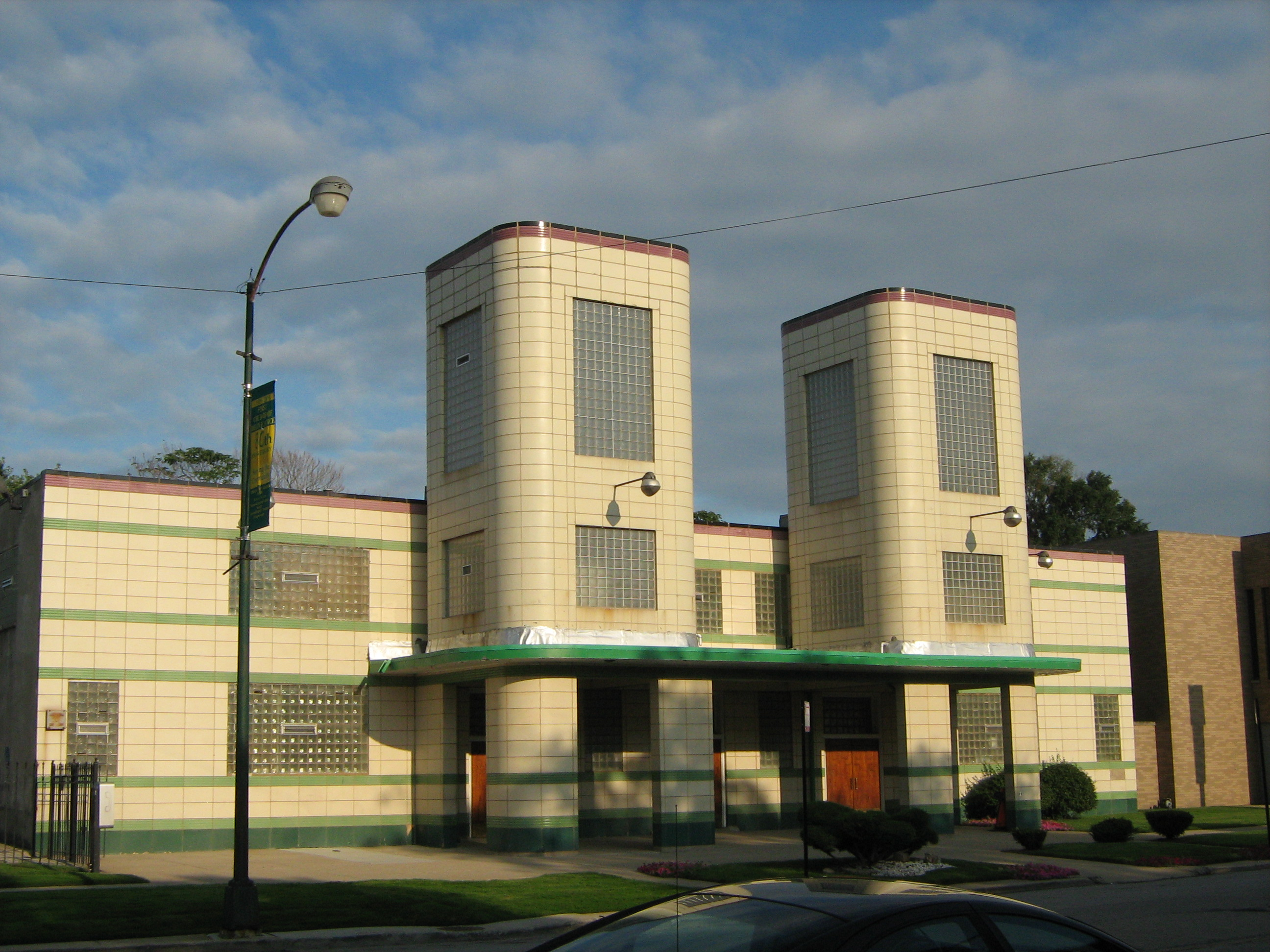
- Walter T. Bailey's First Church of Deliverance in 2009.
- First Church of Deliverance
- Location: Chicago, Illinois
- Address: 4315 South Wabash Avenue
- Country: United States
- Denomination: Spiritual Christianity

History
- Founded: May 8, 1929
- Founder: Clarence H. Cobbs

Architecture
- Style: Streamline Moderne

Chicago Landmark
- Designated: October 5, 1994

First Church of Deliverance is a landmark Spiritual church located at 4315 South Wabash Avenue in Chicago, Illinois, in the United States. First Church of Deliverance was founded by Reverend Clarence H. Cobbs on May 8, 1929. The church began with nine members and held its first service in the basement of his mother's home located in the Bronzeville area on the south side of Chicago. The church was built in 1939 by Walter T. Bailey, and two towers were added to it in 1946 by Kocher, Buss & DeKlerk. It is a rare example of the Streamline Moderne design being used for a house of worship, and was designated a Chicago Landmark on October 5, 1994.
