= First Baptist Church (Montgomery, Alabama) =

Coordinates: 32°22′55″N 86°17′55″W

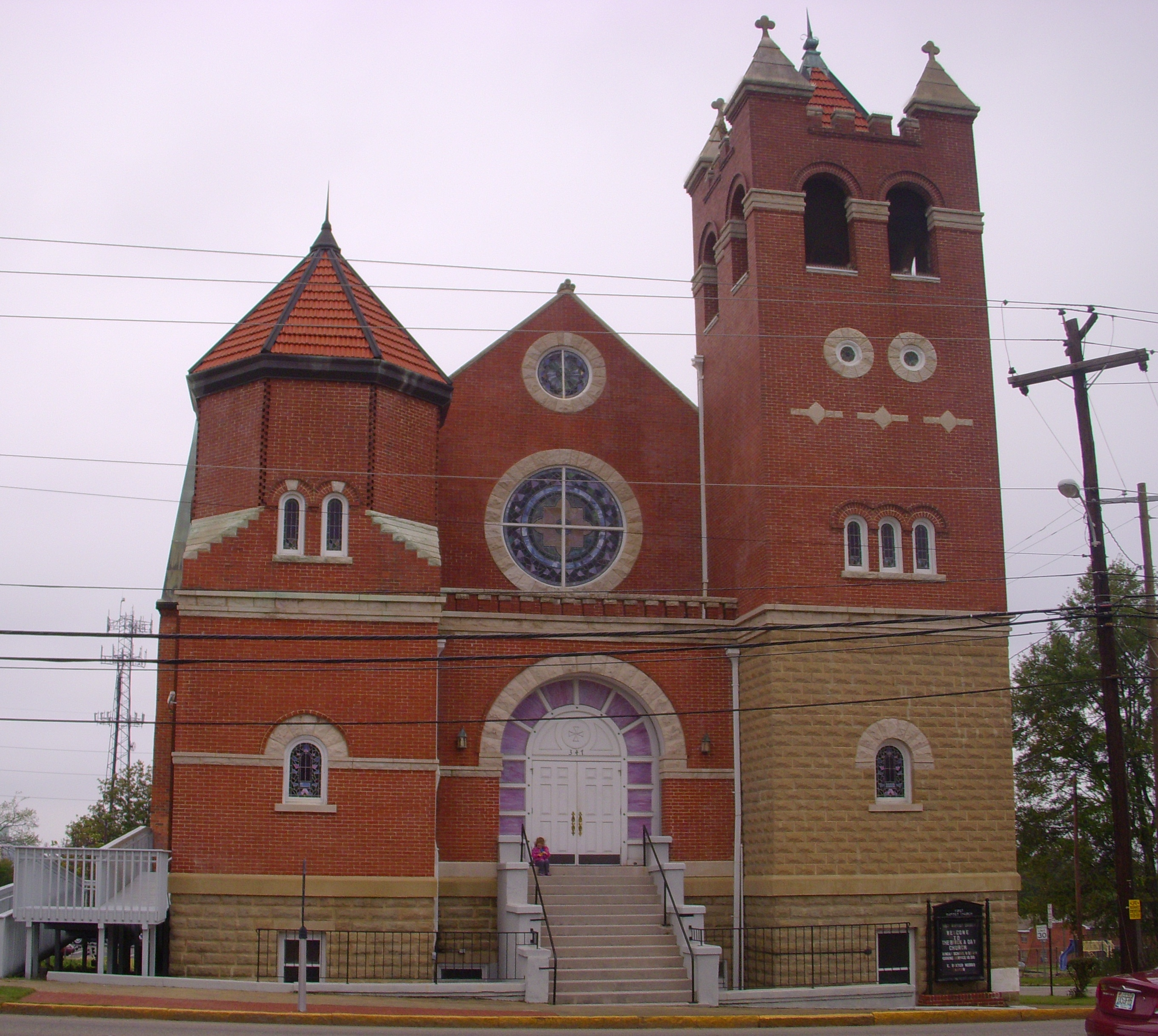
- Front of the First Baptist Church
- First Baptist Church
- Location: North Ripley Street, Montgomery, Alabama
- Country: United States
- Denomination: Baptist
- Website: http://www.firstbaptistchurchmontgomery.com

History
- Founded: 1866

Architecture
- Architect: Walter T. Bailey
- Style: Romanesque Revival
- Completed: 1910–1915 (present building)

Clergy
- Pastor: Anderson Ayers
- First Baptist Church
- U.S. National Register of Historic Places
- Alabama Register of Landmarks and Heritage
- NRHP reference No.: 100010460

Significant dates
- Added to NRHP: June 25, 2024
- Designated ARLH: May 10, 2000

The First Baptist Church (also known as the Brick-A-Day Church) on North Ripley Street in Montgomery, Alabama, is a historic landmark. Founded in downtown Montgomery in 1867 as one of the first black churches in the area, it provided an alternative to the second-class treatment and discrimination African-Americans faced at the other First Baptist Church in the city.

In the first few decades after its establishment the First Baptist Church became one of the largest black churches in the South, growing from hundreds of parishioners to thousands. Almost a hundred years later, in the 1950s and 1960s, it was an important gathering place for activities related to the Civil Rights Movement, and became associated with Ralph Abernathy, the 1955-56 Montgomery bus boycott, and the Freedom Rides of May 1961. The church was listed by the Alabama Historical Commission on the Alabama Register of Landmarks and Heritage on May 5, 2000. It was added to the National Register of Historic Places in 2024.

== History ==
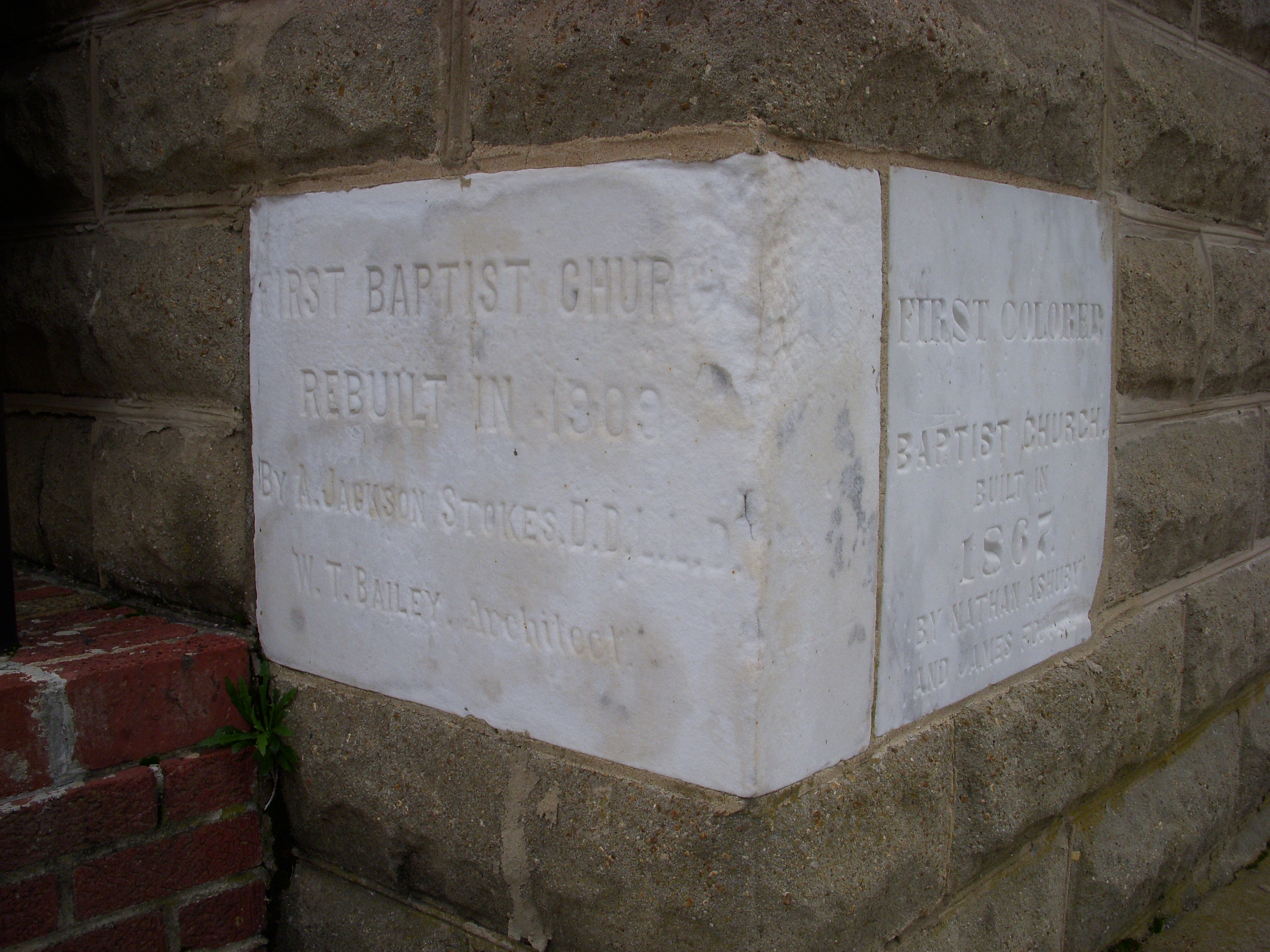
Cornerstone of First Baptist church, Ripley Street/Columbus Street.

The congregation first organized in 1866; early parishioners had worshiped during slavery at the First Baptist Church on Perry Street. Before the American Civil War, blacks were allowed only on the balcony of that church: "they were never allowed on the main floor of the sanctuary unless they were sweeping or mopping." In 1867, 700 African-American communicants had marched to an empty lot on the corner of Ripley Street and Columbus Street, declaring themselves the "First Baptist Church (Colored)" and founding what became "the first 'free Negro' institution in the city." The wooden building itself, which faced north to Columbus Street, was called the Columbus Street Baptist Church.

The first pastor was Nathan Ashby, who also became the first president of the Colored Baptist Convention in Alabama, founded in his church on December 17, 1868. Ashby retired in 1870, after being struck by paralysis. He was followed, briefly, by J.W. Stevens, and starting in 1871, James H. Foster was the pastor for twenty years. Foster is credited with increasing membership from a few hundred to several thousand; his successor, pastor Andrew Stokes, added even more.

Fire destroyed the first frame church. Between 1910 and 1915, the church was rebuilt (now facing east, toward Ripley Street) under the leadership of pastor Stokes. Members of the congregation were asked to each bring a brick a day to build it—hence the church's nickname, the "Brick-A-Day Church." The building was designed in Romanesque Revival style by Walter T. Bailey of the Tuskegee University.

== Civil Rights Movement ==
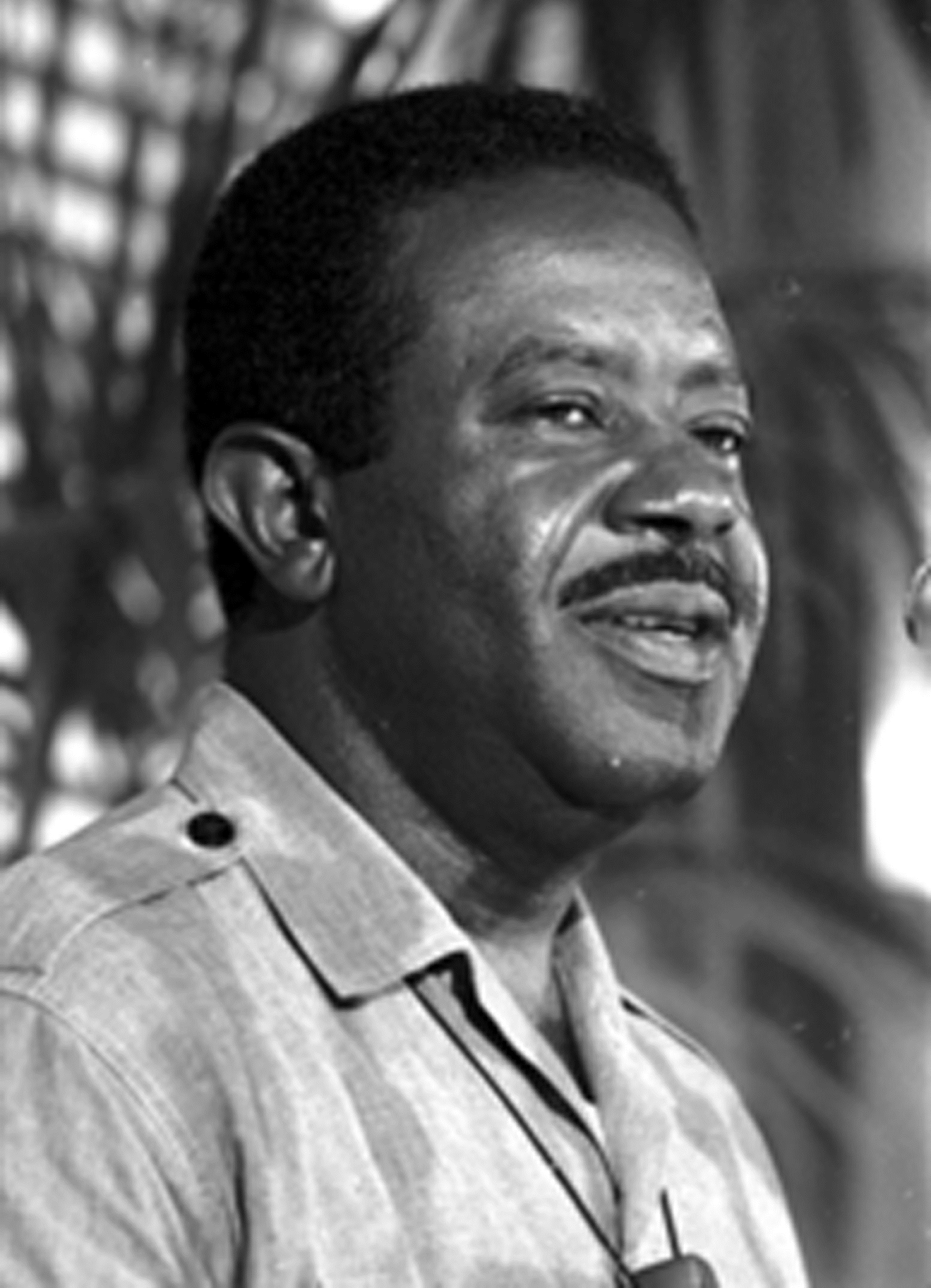
Ralph Abernathy, pastor at First Baptist Church (1952-1961).

From 1952 to 1961, the church was led by civil rights activist Ralph Abernathy, a good friend of Martin Luther King Jr., who preached a few blocks away, at the Dexter Avenue Baptist Church, from 1954 to 1960. During the Montgomery bus boycott (1955–1956), it was the location of mass meetings; Abernathy was a confidante of Edgar Nixon and quickly became involved with the boycott. After the boycott was over, and the buses in Montgomery were desegregated, occasionally buses would get ambushed and shot at. One such shooting, on January 10, 1957, was followed by bombings at Montgomery's Bell Street Baptist Church, the Mount Olive Baptist Church, the Hutchinson Street Baptist Church, and the First Baptist Church and its parsonage (Abernathy's residence). Raymond C. Britt, Jr., was charged with the bombing of the First Baptist Church, and Henry Alexander and James D. York were charged with the bombing of Abernathy's house, but city prosecutor D. Eugene Loe ended up dropping the charges.

In the spring of 1958, the basement of the church was the site of the formal initiation of John Lewis into the civil rights movement. Lewis, who had been active at American Baptist College and Fisk University in Nashville, Tennessee, was planning to enroll at Troy State University in an attempt to desegregate the school, and was invited to Montgomery: at First Baptist Church in the pastor's office in the basement, he met Abernathy and King.

=== First Baptist Church Siege ===
On May 21, 1961, the church was a refuge for the passengers on the Freedom Ride which met with violence at the Greyhound Bus Station in downtown Montgomery. The church was filled with some 1500 worshipers and activists, including Martin Luther King Jr., Fred Shuttlesworth, Diane Nash, and James Farmer. The building was besieged by 3000 whites who threatened to burn it. In the basement, Dr. King, in the company of Abernathy, Wyatt Tee Walker, James Farmer, and John Lewis, was on the phone with United States Attorney General Robert F. Kennedy, while bricks were thrown through the windows and tear gas came drifting in. According to Lewis, Kennedy jokingly asked King to say a prayer, since he was in a church anyway; the activists in the basement were not amused. The events of 20–21 May 1961, including the "siege of First Baptist," played a crucial part in the desegregation of interstate travel.

Robert and John F. Kennedy both pleaded with John Malcolm Patterson, governor of Alabama at the time, to cooperate and help protect the people inside First Baptist Church. Eventually, around 10PM, Patterson placed the city under "qualified-martial rule". A large group of city policemen along with more than a hundred members of the Alabama National Guard had swarmed to First Baptist Church and created a shield around it. Former marshals on the scene were placed under the National Guard command. Shortly after the mob was finally dispersed. Yet the citizens in the church continued to be held in a siege by the National Guardsmen.

At around 4AM, assistant attorney general William Orrick, worked out a deal with the Adjutant General of the National Guards, Henry Graham, to release everyone in the church. National Guard trucks and Jeeps were sent to retrieve the Freedom Riders and parishioners out of the church.

== Historical marker ==
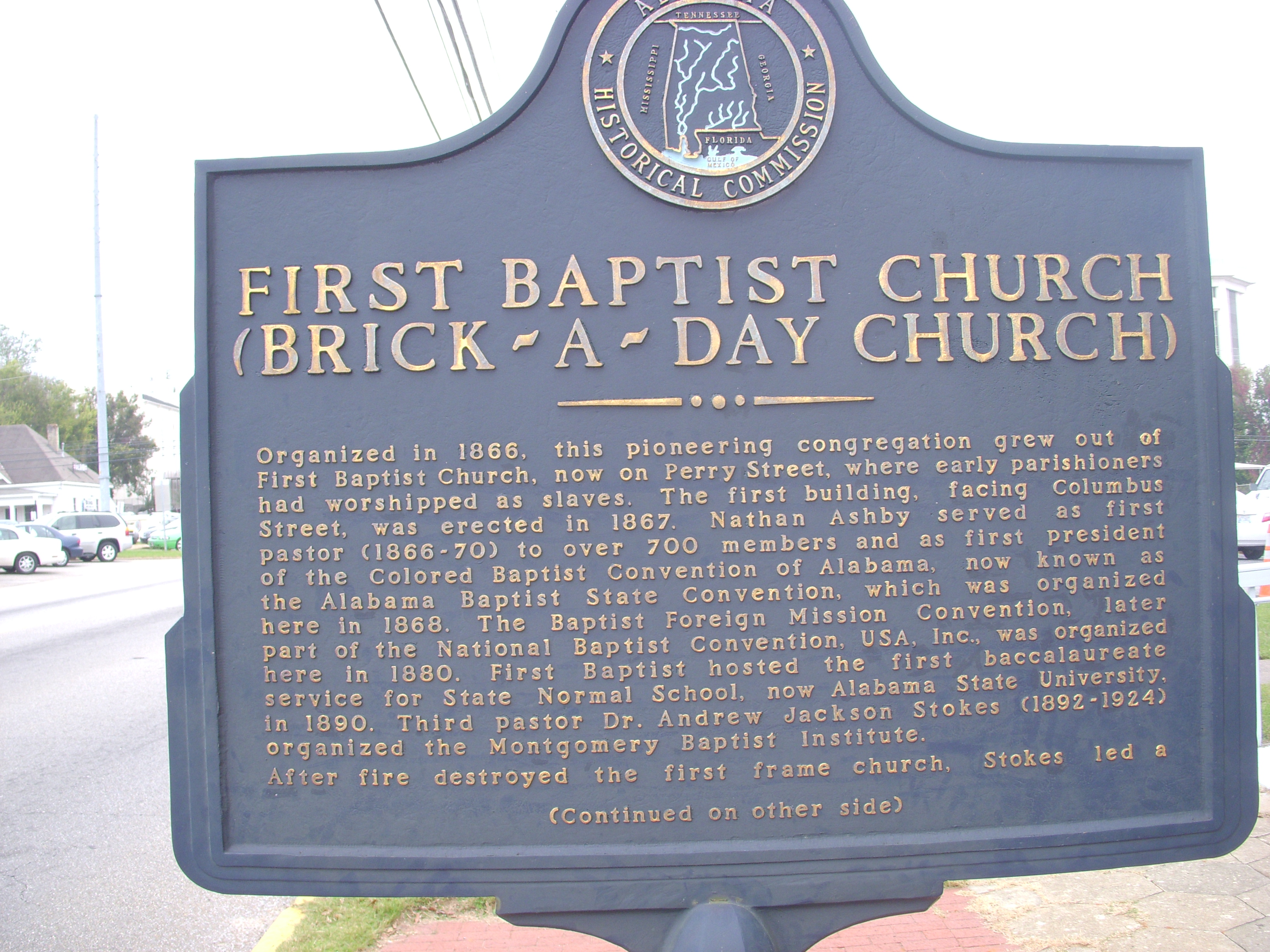
Historical marker, front view

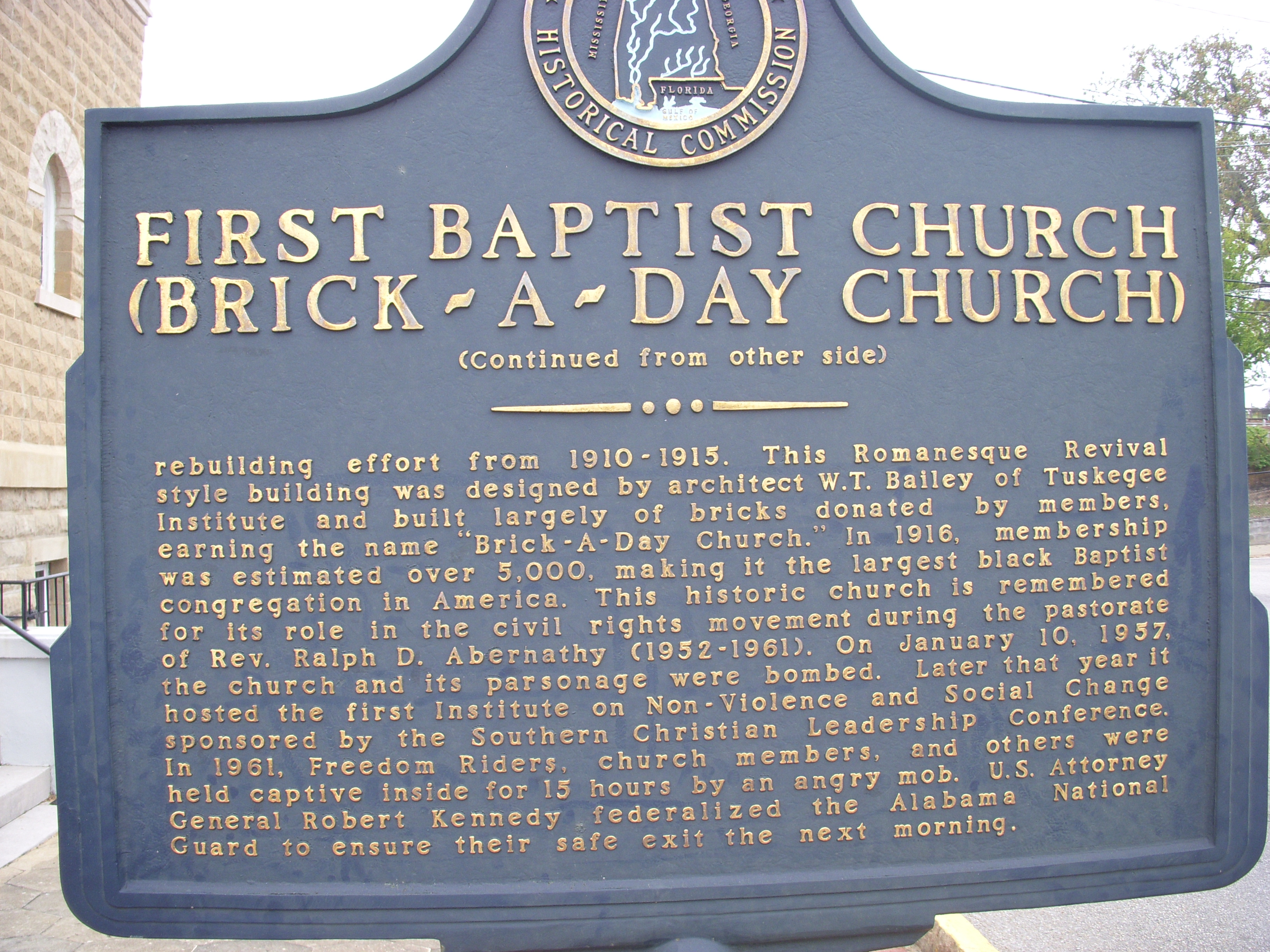
Historical marker, back view
