= Walter T. Bailey =

American architect (1882–1941)

- Born: January 11, 1882; Kewanee, Illinois, U.S.
- Died: February 21, 1941 (aged 59); Chicago, Illinois, U.S.
- Education: University of Illinois Urbana-Champaign
- Occupation: Architect
- Buildings: Woodmen of Union Bath House; First Church of Deliverance

Walter Thomas Bailey (January 11, 1882 – February 21, 1941) was an American architect from Kewanee, Illinois. He was the first African American graduate with a bachelor of science degree in architectural engineering from the University of Illinois at Urbana-Champaign and the first licensed African-American architect in the state of Illinois. He worked at the Tuskegee Institute, and practiced in both Memphis and Chicago. Walter T. Bailey became the second African American that graduated from the University of Illinois.

== Early life and education ==
Walter Thomas Bailey was born January 11, 1882, in Kewanee, Illinois, where he attended Kewanee High School. He enrolled at the University of Illinois at Urbana-Champaign in 1900. Bailey was the first African-American graduate of the University of Illinois' School of Architecture with a Bachelor of Science in architectural engineering. He earned that degree in 1904 and was granted an honorary master's degree in architecture from the university in 1910. On October 15, 1905, Walter T. Bailey married Josephine L. McCurdy. In the same year, Josephine gave birth to their first born, Edyth Hazel. Seven years later they gave birth to their second child, Josephine in 1913.

== Architectural career ==
Bailey was the first licensed African-American architect in the state of Illinois. Initially, after he graduated, Bailey worked for a small architectural firm owned by Henry Eckland in his hometown of Kewanee. During this time, he also worked for a Champaign, Illinois, firm, Spencer & Temple. Bailey assisted in the planning of the 1905 Colonel Wolfe School in Champaign during this period.

In 1905, Bailey was appointed as the head of the Mechanical Industries Department at the Tuskegee Institute. While at Tuskegee, Bailey designed several campus buildings including White Hall (1908), and a girl's dormitory. He remained at Tuskegee until 1916 when he moved to Memphis and opened a practice on Beale Street. After Bailey's move to Memphis he began the first of multiple commissions for the Knights of Pythias of North America, South America, Europe, Asia, Africa and Australia. He designed the Mosaic State Temple Building and the Pythian Theater Building, both in Little Rock in 1922. The next year he undertook another Arkansas commission, this one in Hot Springs, the Pythian Bath House and Sanitarium. The Pythian Bath House and Sanitarium was constructed solely for the use of African Americans.

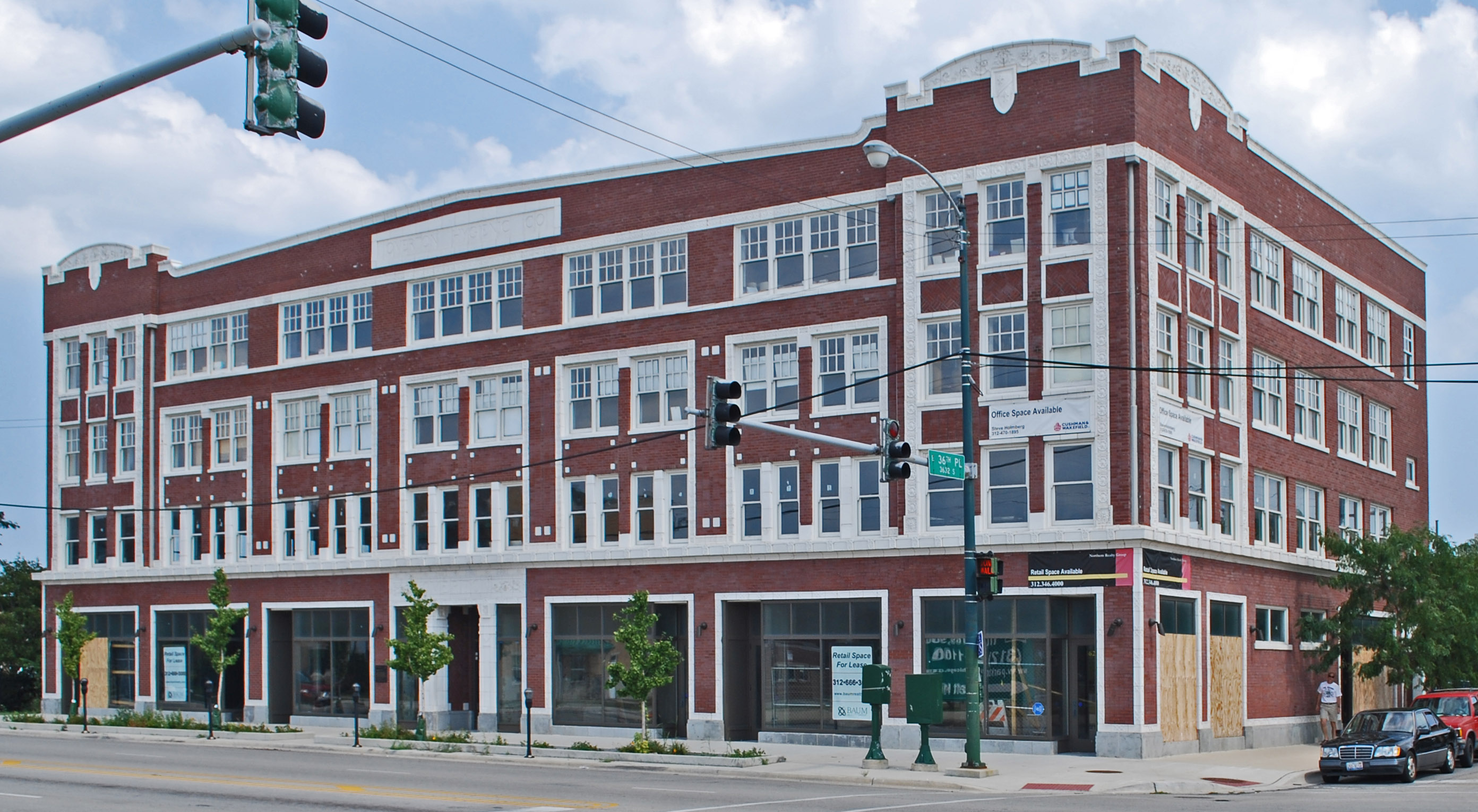
The Overton Hygienic Building on South State Street. Bailey's first Chicago office was on the second floor.

Through his Knights of Pythias connections, Bailey was given what would be the largest commission of his career, the National Knights of Pythias Temple in Chicago, Illinois. Construction began on the building in 1924 and Bailey moved his office to the city. The construction of National Pythian Temple cost $850,000. The site of the temple was on Chicago's south side in an area known as "Bronzeville" or "Black Metropolis". Bailey first rented an office on the second floor of the Overton Hygienic Building on South State Street. Construction on the National Knights of Pythias Temple proceeded slowly and by 1928 the interior of the building remained unfinished. The National Pythian Temple "was planned to be the headquarters of the Knights of Pythias and to house the lodge's combined national offices, numerous meeting halls, and rent-producing stores and offices." Walter T. Bailey designed terra- cotta griffins in the frieze of the Knights of Pythias Temple. Though the Knights of Pythias eventually lost ownership of the building, Bailey did maintain his office in the structure after its completion. The Knights of Pythias Temple was demolished in 1980. A large decorative fragment from the building, an Egyptian pharaoh in glazed terra cotta, probably designed by Baily to celebrate black pride, is conserved in the collection of the Art Institute of Chicago.

Aside from the Knights of Pythias Temple in Chicago Bailey had few major commissions during the 1920s and the subsequent Great Depression greatly decreased business for Bailey and many other black entrepreneurs in the area. The last major project for Bailey was the Chicago Landmark art moderne First Church of Deliverance in 1939. The First Church of Deliverance designed in Art Moderne style, was inspired by Reverend Clarence H. Cobbs. The art Moderne style is predominately composed of strong horizontals with large glass panel windows. Walter T. Bailey implemented the style of Art Moderne by adding lines of green terra-cotta blocks on the facade of the Church of Deliverance. The building served as both a church and a radio station for Reverend Clarance Cobbs to broadcast sermons.

== Death ==
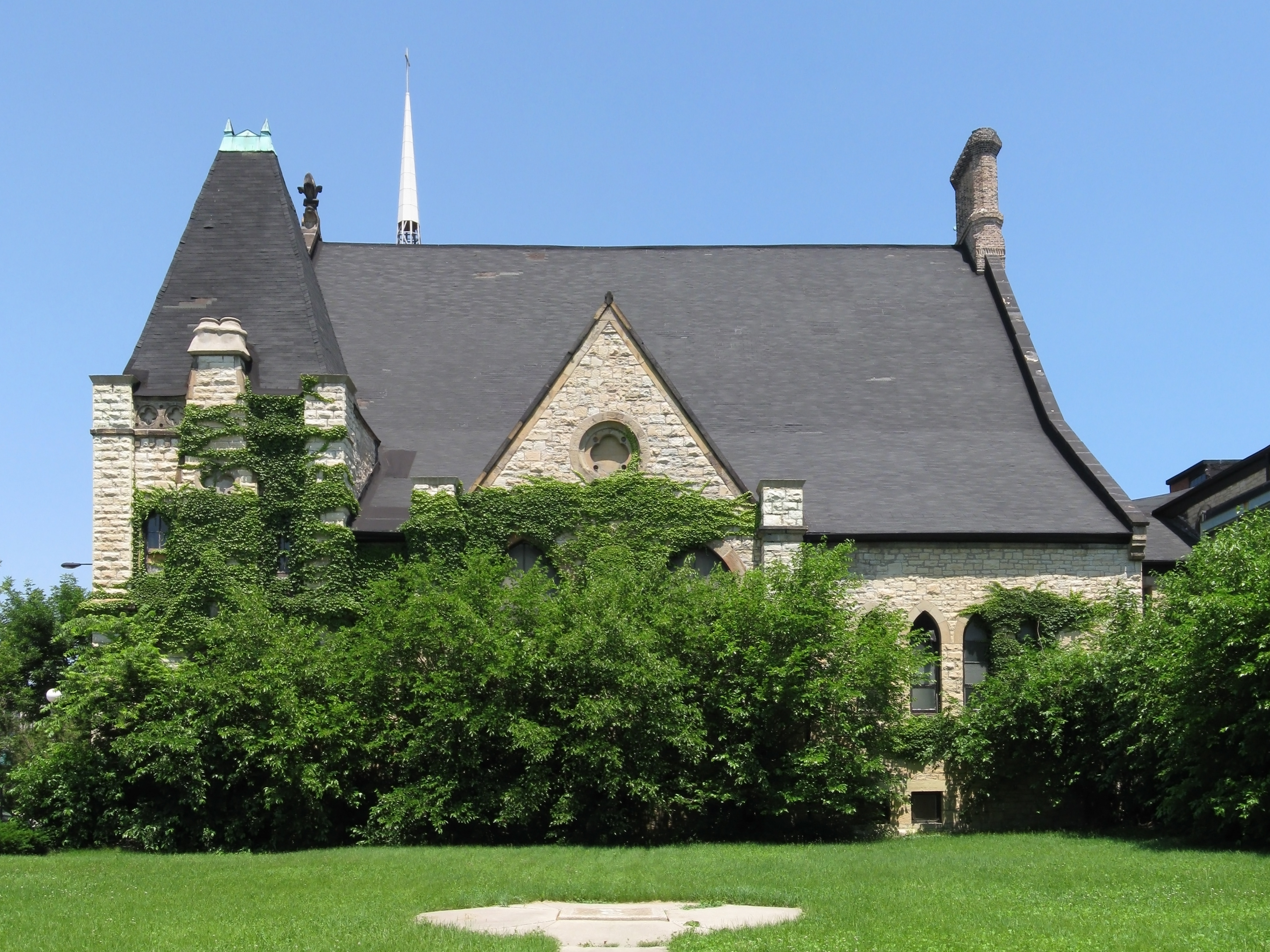
The Olivet Baptist Church, a prominent African-American Chicago church and reportedly one of Bailey's last projects

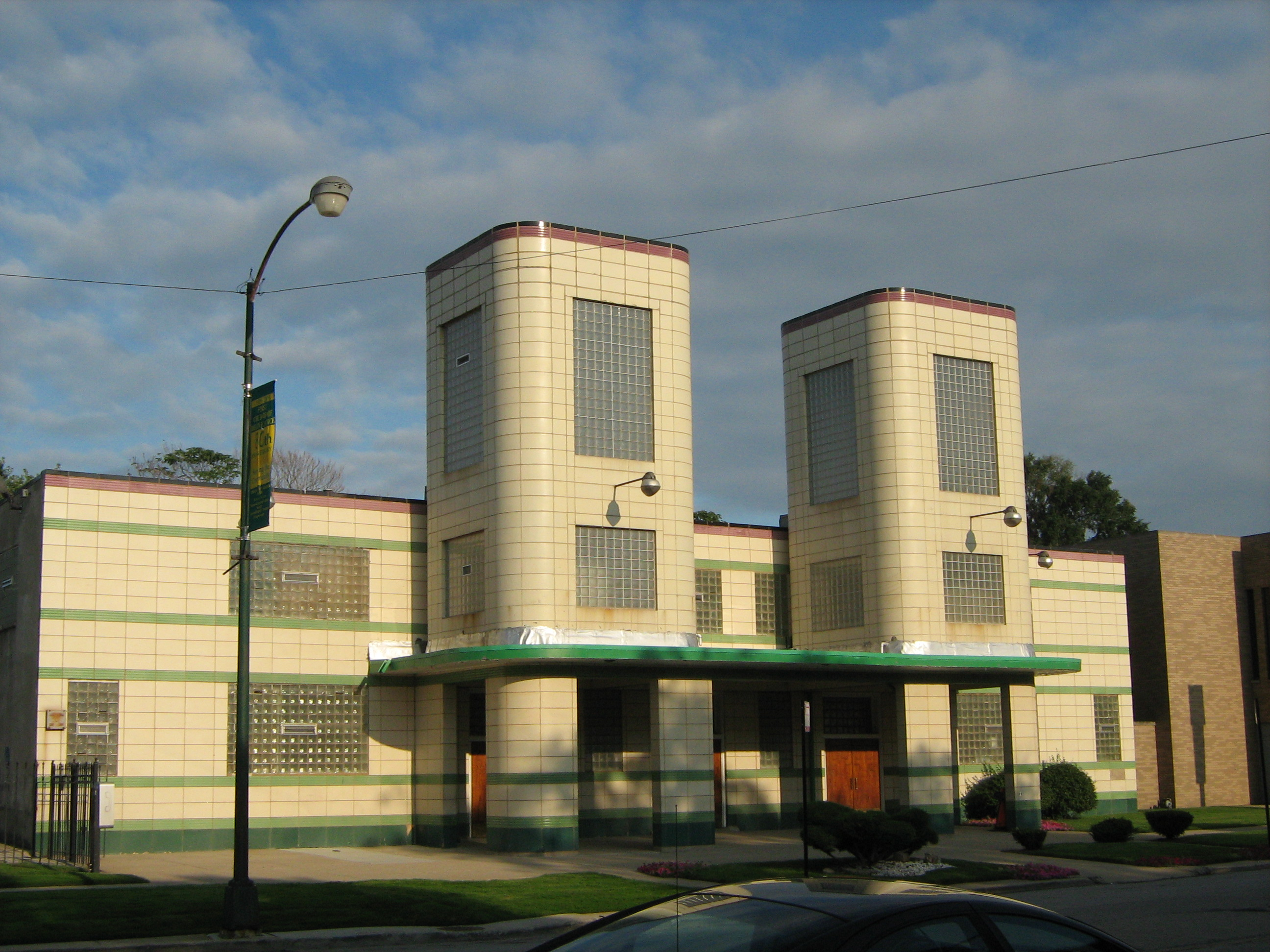
Bailey's First Church of Deliverance, a Chicago Landmark

Bailey died on February 21, 1941, in Chicago, from pneumonia and complications caused by heart disease. Obituaries at the time stated he was working on two projects when he died. One was the Olivet Baptist Church, the other was reportedly the Ida B. Wells Homes but that work was probably in a secondary capacity.

== Selected works ==
- 1905 – Colonel Wolfe School, Champaign, Illinois
- 1906 – Alabama Agricultural Fair Negro Building, Montgomery, Alabama
- 1910–1915 – First Baptist Church, Montgomery, Alabama
- 1922 – Mosaic State Temple Building, Little Rock, Arkansas
- 1922–1923 – Pythian Theater Building, Little Rock, Arkansas
- 1923 – Pythian Bath House and Sanitarium, Hot Springs, Arkansas
- 1924 – Fraternal Savings and Trust Bank, Memphis, Tennessee
- 1924 – Knights of Pythias Building, Nashville, Tennessee
- 1924 – Woodmen of Union Bath House, Hot Springs, Arkansas
- 1924–1928 – National Knights of Pythias Temple, Chicago, Illinois
- 1928 – Momence Country Club, Momence, Illinois (plans only)
- 1929 – Mt. Moriah Lodge No. 28 Free and Accepted Masons, Evanston, Illinois
- 1939 – First Church of Deliverance, Chicago, Illinois
- 1940 – Ida B. Wells Homes, Chicago, Illinois
- 1941 – Olivet Baptist Church, Chicago, Illinois
