= Erwan Dianteill =

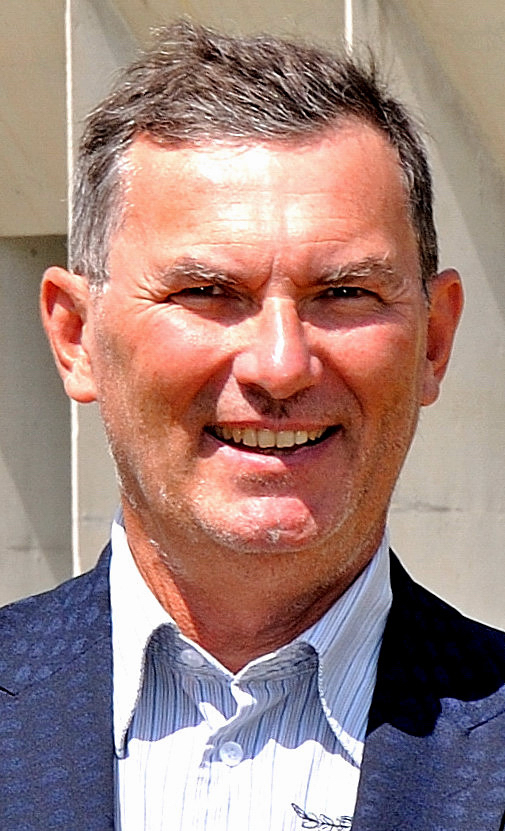
- Born: 1967 (age 58–59)
- Education: Ecole Normale Supérieure Paris-Saclay
- Employer(s): University of Paris (2019) (Faculty of Human and Social Sciences - Sorbonne)
- Organization(s): CANTHEL - Center for Cultural & Social Anthropology
- Title: Sociologist & Ethnologist

Erwan Dianteill (born 1967) is a French sociologist and anthropologist, graduate of the Ecole Normale Supérieure Paris-Saclay, holder of the aggregation in the Social Sciences, Doctor of Sociology and professor of Cultural and Social anthropology at the Sorbonne (University of Paris, est. 2019). He is also Senior Laureate of the Institut Universitaire de France since 2012 and Non-Resident Fellow of the W. E. B. Du Bois Research Institute at Harvard University since 2017. Dianteill's work explores anthropological and sociological theories about religion and interconnections between political and religious powers. It also includes the study of symbolic origins of domination and resistance. He is a specialist in the anthropology of African and African-American religions.

Erwan Dianteill created in 2010 the Center of Cultural and Social Anthropology (CANTHEL) component of the School of Humanities and Social Sciences – Sorbonne. Along with Francis Affergan, he also founded cArgo – International Journal for Cultural and Social Anthropology (Paris, France), in 2011.

He has twice served as Chair of the Department of Social sciences of the Paris Descartes University, then University of Paris (2019) (2010–2012, 2018–2024).

He was a visiting professor at the University of California, Santa Barbara; Tulane University; the University of Buenos Aires; the National University of Honduras; the University of Havana; the University of Vienna; the University of Salento; and Harvard University (Divinity School in 2016 and African and African American Studies Department in 2020). He was a Fellow of the Hutchins Center for African and African American Research at Harvard University in 2024–2025. He is a visiting professor at the University Ca'Foscari in Venice in 2026.

His book The Oracle and the Temple - From Medieval Geomancy to the Church of Ifa (Nigeria, Benin) was awarded the History of Religions Grand Prize (Pierre-Antoine Bernheim Foundation) by the Academy of Inscriptions and Belles-Lettres - Institut de France in 2025. It is the first work on Africa to receive this prize.

== Critical readings on religion ==
Dianteill conducts a critical reading of the history of anthropology and sociology of religions (three books co-authored with Michael Löwy).

Dianteill contributed to these works with a critical assessment of the contributions of Marcel Mauss, W. E. B. Du Bois, Roger Bastide, Michel Leiris, Zora Neale Hurston, Roger Caillois, Lydia Cabrera, Lucien Goldmann and Pierre Bourdieu to the social sciences of religion.

In the third book of their trilogy (Le Sacré Fictif, 2017), Dianteill and Löwy have also shown the fertility of literary fiction to understand religion and the sacred. Dianteill analyzes in that book the fictions of Joris K. Huysmans (modern European witchcraft), Ahmadou Kourouma (modern African witchcraft), Amos Tutuola (the African spirit world), Umberto Eco (religion and eroticism) and Alison Lurie (American millenarianism).

== Research on African American religions ==
Dianteill has done researches on Afro-American cultures (Cuba, United States, Brazil), on the evolution of autochthonous religions in West Africa (Benin) and on new Christian churches. He published two books on Afrocuban religions in Havana and one book on the African American Spiritual Church in New Orleans.

His work on Cuban Santeria (Des dieux et des signes, 2000; Dioses y signos, 2019), and in particular his very precise study of the emergence of a written tradition within this Afro-Cuban religion, is an “essential reference” in the field (Lorenzo López y Sebastián, professor at the Universidad Complutense). According to Roberto Motta, a specialist in African religions in Brazil, this book is a "veritable treatise on Afro-Cuban religions (...) There isn't a single Brazilian who has spent any time with Candomblé in Bahia and Rio, or Xangô in Recife, who can't find himself in the people, the temples, the rituals, the initiations described here, and in Erwan Dianteill's enthusiasm. “ For Bertrand Hell, this is a ”major work“, which ”favors a singular method combining classical analysis of interviews, texts and figures with a personal religious investment“, while renewing ”the anthropological view of Afro-Cuban religions and, more broadly, of all systems of communication with the spirits ".

In addition, Dianteill is one of the few researchers to have studied the African-American spiritual churches of New Orleans, which integrate Catholic, Protestant elements and an underlying Vaudou influence. Denis Constant-Martin, professor at Sciences Po, writes about Dianteill 's book La Samaritaine Noire (The Black Samaritan Woman) : "Erwan Dianteill's remarkable investigation not only uncovers a network of atypical churches, it also provides a better understanding of the history of New Orleans, and confirms, based on other sources, the historical links between the city and the Caribbean region."

His interview of Henry Louis Gates Jr., on the occasion of the publication of Gates' book "Black Church" in France, clarifies the use and limits of Marxist theory to explain African American religion. The same interview revisits the debate between Melville Herskovits and E. Franklin Frazier on Africanisms in the Black Church.

== Research on African religions ==
Erwan Dianteill has been conducting a fieldwork since 2007 in Porto-Novo (Benin) on the transformation of the Fa/Ifá divination in a modern African city (in 2009, film of a Fa/Ifá initiation and complete recording of the myths attached to the Fa/Ifá divination signs). He has shown the meaningful link between Ifa divination and Arab and Latin geomancy in the Middle Ages. One of the signs of the Ifa system is the equivalent of the Morning Star in medieval geomancy, that is the planet Venus.

Furthermore, Dianteill has traced the history of the Church of Ifá since its founding in the early 1930s in Nigeria and Benin. This approach is supplemented by a precise ethnography of the contemporary liturgy of this religious institution, which was formed from the mythology of Ifá, taken up in a Protestant theological and ecclesial form. This investigation on the Church of Ifá questions religious syncretism between African culture and Christianity in new ways, by reformulating the categories of material acculturation and formal acculturation (Roger Bastide). The book L'oracle et le temple (2024) is, according to Jacob Olupona, "the latest work on Ifa scholarship and stands as important intervention in the anthropology of religion".

In addition, Dianteill was the first scholar to study extensively the Epiphany festival of Porto-Novo (Benin), a unique popular celebration that a Catholic missionary (Francis Aupiais) and a Vodun dignitary (Zounon Medje) initiated in 1923. He published the first book on the subject in Gun language (Fifanixwe xo̳gbonu to̳n / L'Epiphanie de Porto-Novo, Porto-Novo & Paris, Editions des Lagunes, 2d ed. 2018), with a preface from the philosopher Paulin Hountondji.

Dianteill's three books, on Havana in the 1990s (Des dieux et des signes, 2000), New Orleans in the 2000s (La Samaritaine noire, 2006) and Porto-Novo in the 2010s (L'oracle et le temple, 2024), form a trilogy of Afro-Atlantic religious anthropology. Dianteill has carried out ethnographic and historical research in these colonial and port cities, all part of the Atlantic slave trade and creolization places for African and European civilizations. The conclusion of L'oracle et le temple gives an account of this itinerary and proposes a comparative analysis of Afro-American and African religions, between Latin America, North America and West Africa.

Far from looking for the historical origins of Afro-American religions, Dianteill looks at the process of transculturation and creolization at work in colonial and post-colonial America as a heuristic model. This method leads to a better understanding of the transformations of contemporary African religions, in urban, multi-ethnic environments characterized by great religious diversity.

== Studies on Dante and Geomancy ==
In the 2020s, Dianteill extended his research on the history of divination to the study of medieval literature, proposing a geomantic reading of Dante's Purgatorio. In the article "Virgil the Geomancer: A Geomantic Reading of “Purgatorio” from Dante’s Commedia, with a Focus on Canto XIX," published in 2026 in the International Journal of Divination and Prognostication, he analyzes the reference to "geomancers" in Canto XIX of Purgatorio and connects it to the medieval geomantic tradition.

The Divinatory Comedy: Geomancy in Dante’s Purgatorio (Brill, oct. 2026), falls within the same context. In it, Dianteill develops the hypothesis that certain narrative and symbolic structures of the second canticle can be interpreted in light of medieval geomantic systems, particularly in relation to the tradition attributed to Bartolomeo da Parma.

These works connect Dianteill's research on divinatory systems with the study of medieval European culture, treating geomancy as part of the doctrinal and symbolic repertoire available in the late Middle Ages.

== At the UNESCO ==
Erwan Dianteill is counselor for the Humanities and Social Sciences at the French National Commission of the UNESCO.

He was President of the Intergovernmental Council for the Management of Social Transformations (MOST) of the UNESCO, which includes 35 countries (2019–2021). .

He was previously vice-president of the same council from 2017 until 2019, representing Western Europe and North America.

Erwan Dianteill (University of Paris, President of the MOST Intergovernmental Council) and Ndri Thérèse Assié Lumumba (Cornell University, President of the MOST Scientific Council) are the organizers of the Global Colloquium on Social Sciences and the COVID-19 Pandemic, bringing together researchers from nineteen UNESCO member states (21-22 of October, UNESCO, Paris, 2021). The proceedings of this historical conference have been published in 2024: "Preparing for the next pandemic leveraging social and human sciences for crisis: lessons from COVID-19".

== Decorations ==
- Senior Laureate of the Institut Universitaire de France in 2012
- Knight of the Palmes Académiques ("Academic Palms") in 2016.
- Senior Laureate of the Institut Universitaire de France in 2023
- History of Religions Grand Prize (Pierre-Antoine Bernheim Foundation) by the Academy of Inscriptions and Belles-Lettres - Institut de France in 2025.

== Main publications (in French) ==
- 2026 The Divinatory Comedy - Geomancy in Dante's Purgatorio, Brill, 407 p.
- 2024 The Oracle and the Temple - From Medieval Geomancy to the Church of Ifa (Nigeria, Benin), Geneva, Labor & Fides, 336 p.
- 2019 Dioses y signos, Madrid, Ediciones de la Universidad Complutense, 2019, 465 p. (Expanded Spanish edition of Des dieux et des signes, 2000). Preface: Carmen Bernand.
- 2017 Porto-Novo Epiphany - Texts, History, Ethnography, Porto-Novo & Paris, Editions des Lagunes, 2017 (bilingual, Gungbe and French); Preface: Paulin Hountondji.
- 2017 Fictitious sacred - Sociology and religion, literary approaches (with Michael Löwy), Paris, Editions de l'éclat, collection "Imaginary philosophy"
- 2011 Eshu, god of Africa and the New World (with Michèle Chouchan), Paris, Larousse
- 2009 Sociology and religion III – Unusual approaches (with Michael Löwy), Paris, PUF, collection "Sociology today"
- 2008 (editor, with Bertrand Hell) The Spectacular Possession : theater and globalization, journal Gradhiva, April 2008.
- 2006 The Black Samaritan Woman - African American Spiritual churches in New Orleans, Editions de l’Ecole des Hautes Etudes en Sciences Sociales, collection "Cahiers de l’Homme"
- 2006 Sociology and religion II – Dissident approaches (with Michael Löwy), Paris, PUF, collection "Sociology today"
- 2000 Of Gods and signs (Des dieux et des signes)- Initiation, divination and writing in Afro-Cuban religions. Paris, Editions de l’Ecole des Hautes Etudes en Sciences Sociales, collection "Civilisations et sociétés"
- 1995 The Scholar and the Santero - Birth of the study of Afro-Cuban religions (1906-1954). Paris, Editions L'Harmattan / Université Paris 8, Collection "Histoire des Antilles Hispaniques", ISBN 2-7384-3829-6
