= List of spiritualist organizations =

This is a list of notable spiritualist organizations:

- Agasha Temple of Wisdom
- Arthur Findlay College
- Camp Chesterfield
- Federation of Spiritulist Churches and Assoc.
- International Spiritualist Federation
- Metropolitan Spiritual Churches of Christ
- National Spiritualist Association of Churches
- Spiritualist Association of Great Britain
- Spiritualists' National Union
- IANDS

== See also ==
- Spiritualist church
