= Metropolitan Spiritual Churches of Christ =

Christian denomination

- Classification: Esoteric Christianity
- Orientation: Spiritual
- Theology: Spiritualism
- Polity: Episcopal
- Presiding Bishop: James D. Tindall, Sr.
- Headquarters: Kansas City, Missouri
- Founder: Bishop William F. Taylor
- Official website: mscccongress.org

The Metropolitan Spiritual Churches of Christ (MSCC) is a Christian denomination descending from the spiritual church movement. Formed in 1925 in Kansas City, Missouri, the MSCC is divided into 7 dioceses led by diocesan prelates. The current presiding prelate for the denomination is Bishop James D. Tindall Sr.

== History ==
In September 1925, the first congregation—Metropolitan Spiritual Church of Christ—was established in Kansas City, Missouri by Bishop William F. Taylor (not to be confused with Bishop William Taylor, missionary) and Elder Leviticus L. Boswell. Previously, Taylor served within the Christian Methodist Episcopal Church, and Boswell served within the Metropolitan Community Church; Boswell was ordained as an elder within the Church of God in Christ. Leaving their established religious communities to establish a Spiritualist movement, one member claimed the MSCC "provided in part an 'umbrella group for gays.'" In 1926, the Metropolitan Spiritual Churches of Christ began ordaining women ministers.

Following the death of Bishop Taylor, a succession crisis occurred, and in 1942 the MSCC merged with the Divine Spiritual Churches of the Southwest, based in New Orleans, Louisiana. This merger created the United Metropolitan Spiritual Churches of Christ, though the united and uniting church schismed into two separate denominations: the United Metropolitan Spiritual Churches of Christ, and the Metropolitan Spiritual Churches of Christ in Kansas City.

In 1974, the MSCC held its 49th congress under the leadership of Bishop Taylor's successor, Bishop Clarence H. Cobbs. Under Bishop Taylor's administration, Cobbs founded the First Church of Deliverance in May 1929. By 1979, Lucretia L. Smith became the first female presiding bishop of the denomination.

== Doctrine ==
As a part of the spiritual church movement, the Metropolitan Spiritual Churches of Christ syncretizes certain tenets of Christian Science, Pentecostalism, and Methodism. The MSCC also teaches the foursquare gospel and some of its churches use Catholic iconography and statues, though ritual items and belief systems vary through each congregation; once, the denomination officially practiced seances, however the MSCC "has attempted to disassociate itself from certain aspects of the larger Spiritual movement (.e.g., seances) and particularly Voodoo."
