= International Spiritualist Federation =

International society

- Abbreviation: ISF
- Formation: 1923
- Founded at: Barcelona (proposed), officially established in 1923
- Services: Runs courses and holds lectures annually to raise awareness of spiritualism
- Head of the organisation: Arthur Conan Doyle (1925 conference)

The International Spiritualist Federation is a society dedicated to supporting spiritualist churches around the globe, with particular emphasis on those based in countries which do not support spiritualism as a religion. The federation was first proposed at an 1888 conference held in Barcelona, but was officially established in 1923. Every year since then they have run courses and held lectures for one week which attempt to raise awareness of spiritualism. Particularly notable was the 1925 conference attended by then head of the organisation, Sir Arthur Conan Doyle, who blamed ectoplasm for his faulty slides during his presentation.
