= Spiritual church movement =

African American Spiritualist churches

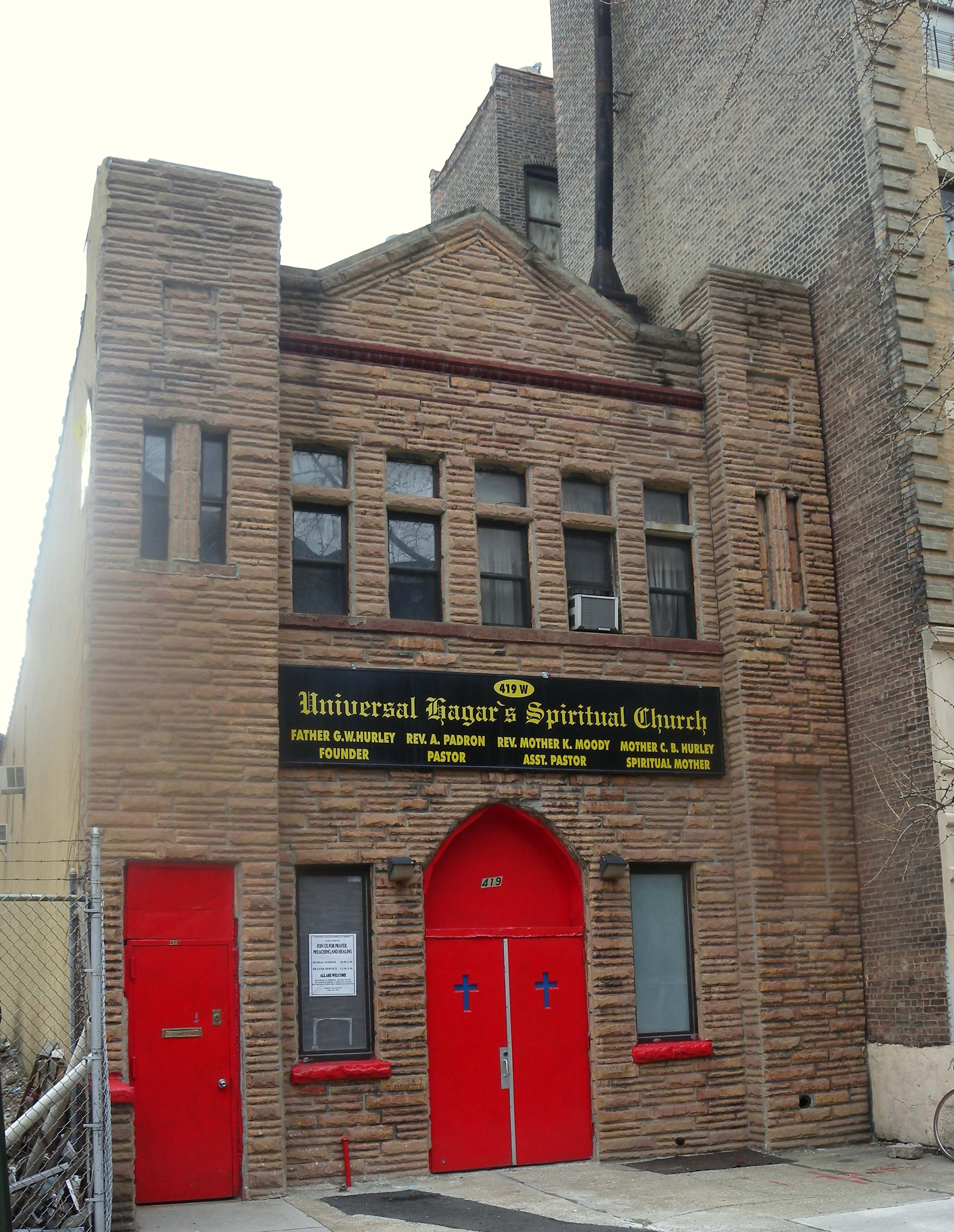
Universal Hagar's Spiritual Church, New York City

The spiritual church movement is an informal name for a group of loosely allied and also independent Spiritualist churches and Spiritualist denominations that have in common that they have been historically based in the African American community.

Many of them owe their origin to the evangelical work of Leafy Anderson, a black religious leader of the early 20th century who was born in Wisconsin and in 1913 founded the Eternal Life Christian Spiritualist Association. In 1920, she relocated to New Orleans, Louisiana, where she demonstrated mediumship by bringing messages from her spirit guide Black Hawk, a historical war leader of the Native American Sauk tribe, who had lived near where she was born.

Although the churches founded by Anderson are often associated with New Orleans, the spiritual church movement has always been national in scope. It spread quickly throughout America during the 1920s, and one impetus for its diffusion was that in 1922, the National Spiritualist Association of Churches expelled or made unwelcome all of its black members. This led to the formation of a national group called the Colored Spiritualist Association of Churches, and within a few years there were Black Spiritualist churches in Chicago, Detroit, Philadelphia, and many other cities. During the decade preceding World War II, the Spiritual churches of New York City were well documented in print and film.

At the present time, the spiritual church movement encompasses primarily churches which are influenced by Protestant Christian worship styles, especially Baptist and Pentecostal praise music, as well as churches that contain a great deal of Catholic imagery, including the veneration of saints.

It is common usage to distinguish spiritual church movement churches from other, often less explicitly Christian, Spiritualist churches, by the use of the name "Spiritual" rather than "Spiritualist" in their titles. This naming convention is found in mid-20th-century books such as How To Conduct a Candle Light Service by Mikhail Strabo and Rev. Adele Clemens of Divine Harmony Spiritual Church. It is also notable in the names of Christian Spiritualist denominations within the Spiritual Church Movement, such as:

- Metropolitan Spiritual Churches of Christ, founded in 1925
- Pentecostal Spiritual Assemblies of Christ Worldwide, founded in 1938 (whose motto is "Pentecostal by Birth, Spiritual by Lifestyle, Apostolic by Experience, and Christian by Demand. A Spiritual Church... On a Spiritual Foundation... Walking in the Supernatural..."),
- Mount Zion Spiritual Temple, founded by King Louis H. Narcisse in Oakland, California, in 1945, and the allied churches he founded and led in Detroit, Michigan; Sacramento, California; Bakersfield, California; and Houston, Texas
- Universal Hagar's Spiritual Church, founded in the 1920s, which also operates the Hagar’s School of Mediumship and Psychology.

== See also ==
- List of Spiritualist organizations
