= Bendann =

Bendann is a surname. Notable people with the name include:

- Daniel Bendann (1836–1914), American photographer
- Effie Bendann (1877/78–1936), American teacher and author
