= Hornor =

Hornor is a surname. Notable people with the surname include:

- Charles W. Hornor (1813–1905), American lawyer and political activist
- Edward Hornor Coates (1846-1921), American businessman
- John Hornor Jacobs (born 1971), American author
- Lynn Hornor (1874–1933), American politician
- Thomas Hornor (surveyor) (1785–1844), British land surveyor, artist and inventor
