= National Museum of Industrial History =

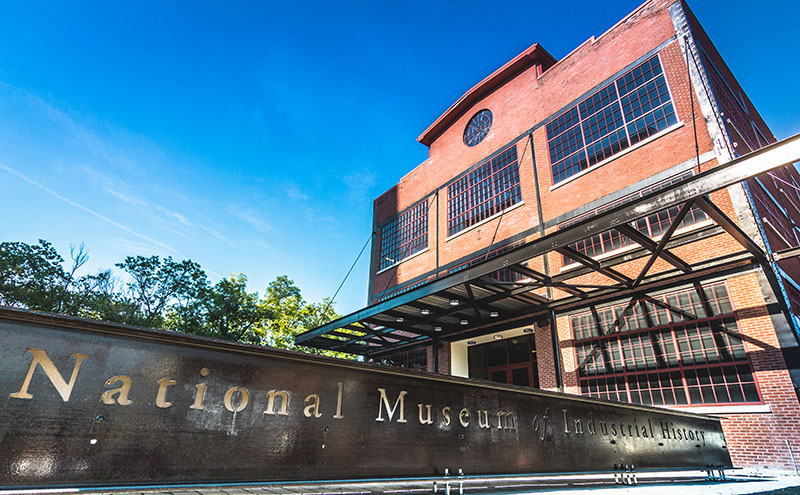
- National Museum of Industrial History in Bethlehem, Pennsylvania
- Established: 2016
- Location: 602 East 2nd Street, Bethlehem, Pennsylvania, U.S.
- Coordinates: 40.6128°N 75.3710°W
- Type: Historical museum
- CEO: Kara Mohsinger
- Curator: Andria Zaia
- Website: nmih.org

The National Museum of Industrial History, abbreviated NMIH, housed in the former facility of Bethlehem Steel in Bethlehem, Pennsylvania, is a museum affiliated with the Smithsonian Institution that seeks to preserve, educate, and display the industrial history of the nation. It holds a collection of artifacts from the textile, steel and iron, and propane gas industries.

The museum holds a significant collection of industrial machinery on loan from the institute's National Museum of American History. The museum also has a large collection of documents, machinery, photographs, and other archival material from Bethlehem Steel, one of the world's largest steel manufacturers prior to its 2001 bankruptcy and 2003 dissolution.

The museum opened in August 2016 with the goal to "forge a connection between America's industrial past and the innovations of today by educating the public and inspiring the visionaries of tomorrow". The $7.5 million museum has four exhibitions, each focusing on a different aspect of industrial history that affected both Pennsylvania and the rest of the country. The museum showcases the nation's industrial past by highlighting the machinery and the lives of workers at that time period.

== History ==
The National Museum of Industrial History opened in August 2016 in Bethlehem, Pennsylvania. The museum's curator of collections said the museum's goal was "to forge a connection between America's industrial past and the innovations of today by educating the public and inspiring the visionaries of tomorrow."

The museum occupies the former Bethlehem Steel plant building, which had been renovated many times since its initial construction. The steel mill has been closed since 1995. Bethlehem Steel was the nation's largest shipbuilder and second-largest steel manufacturer.

Each of the museum's exhibitions represents a certain aspect of industrial history in Pennsylvania and the nation. The museum is the first affiliate museum of the Smithsonian Institution. The museum was proposed in the 1990s, but was sidelined due to legal issues, which prevented clearance for opening until 2015. During its first few years, the museum has raised nearly $17 million.

The delay prompted a state grand jury investigation, whose 2014 report concluded the museum suffered from serious mismanagement and wasted public and private funds. The panel referred the matter to the Pennsylvania Attorney General's office but the Attorney General found no evidence of criminal wrongdoing or misappropriation of funds, concluded the museum was financially viable, and gave the museum two years to open or dissolve. The museum then designed and created the exhibits on time.

== Exhibitions ==
=== Machinery Hall ===
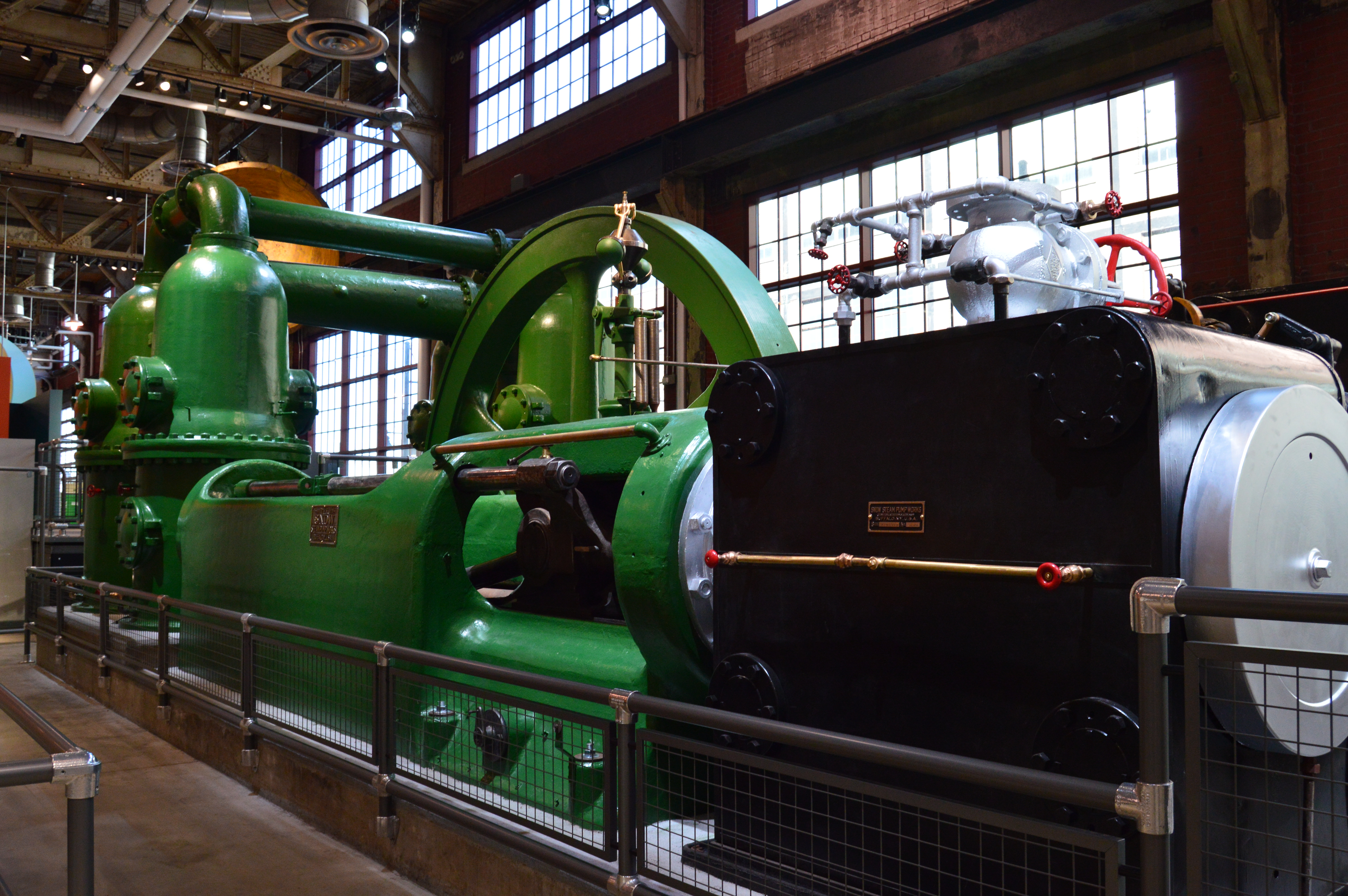
A Corliss steam engine at the museum

The Machinery Hall displays the then-current American industrial technology from the 1876 Centennial International Exposition in Philadelphia.

This exhibit includes an interactive display of Bethlehem Steel's history of industry dominance to engage the viewers passing by. Other depictions within this display include presentations describing where the produced steel was used and the backgrounds of origin of Bethlehem Steel's workers. Employees immigrated from several European countries to work at the company.

=== Iron and steel ===
The iron and steel collection celebrates the history of Bethlehem Steel, the location of the museum itself. This collection is a permanent part of the museum and its artifacts are mainly donated by Bethlehem Steel. It focuses on the corporation's history of steel-making. This exhibit serves to present insight into the daily lives of workers at Bethlehem Steel which employed 31,000 people at peak.

The three Bethlehem Steel plant models showcased in this exhibit were used in training employees and testing out modifications to the factories. Additionally, the first piece of steel ever made in the Bethlehem Steel mill along with a commemorative anvil. There is an interactive map that allows users to see the reach Bethlehem Steel had across the United States.

=== Silk Gallery Hall ===
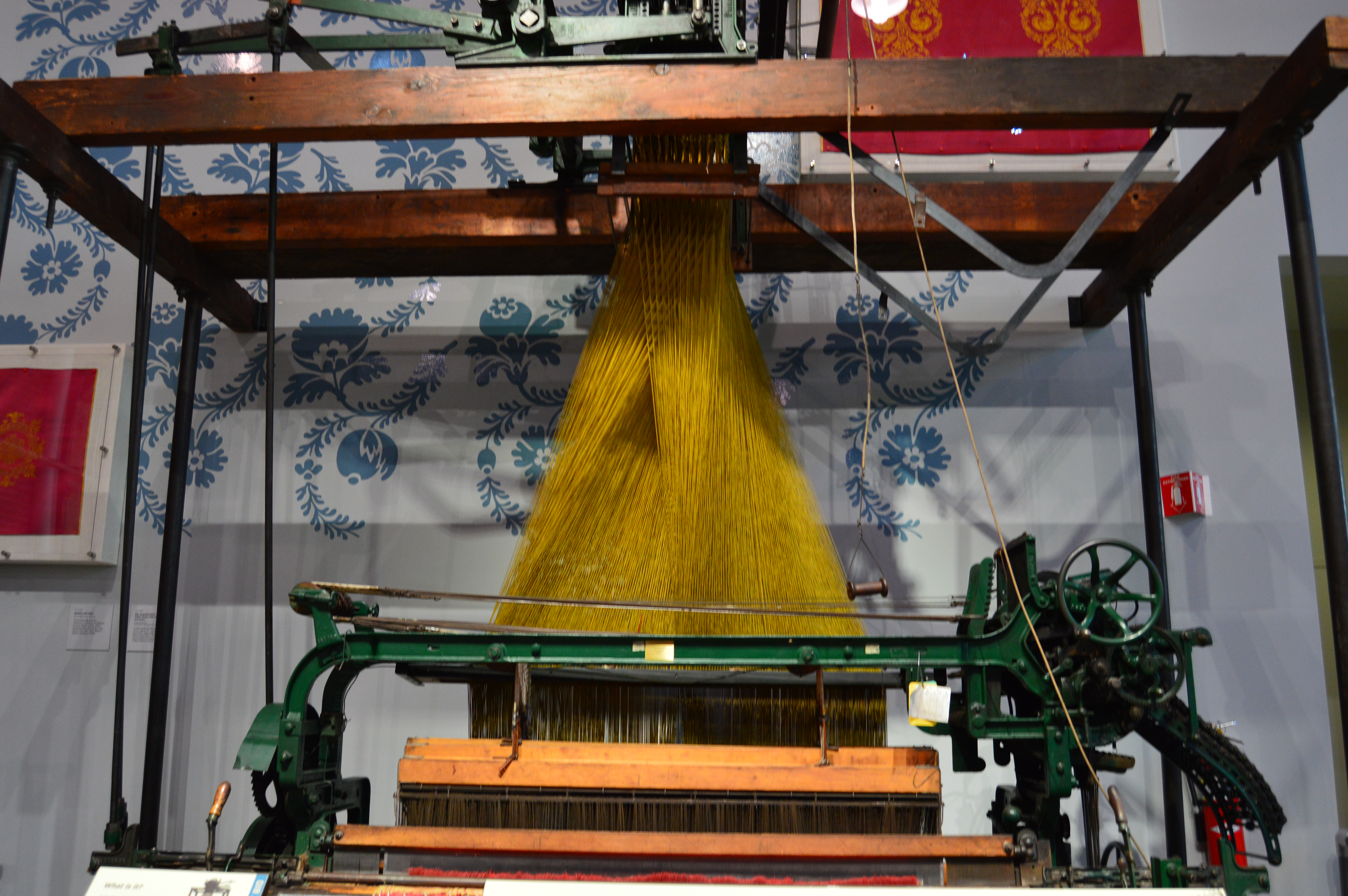
A Jacquard machine at the museum

While the men worked at Bethlehem Steel, women and young children worked at Lehigh Valley Silk Mills which employed even more people than the steel industry did in Bethlehem. The Silk Gallery serves to tell the story of these working women and children. This exhibit, a permanent part of the museum, walks visitors through an interactive process of how silk was made. Visitors are able to experience the work done by workers by holding a 20-pound bobbin tray that children carried for hours at the silk factories. Other tools are on display such as line shafts and looms.

=== Propane Gallery ===
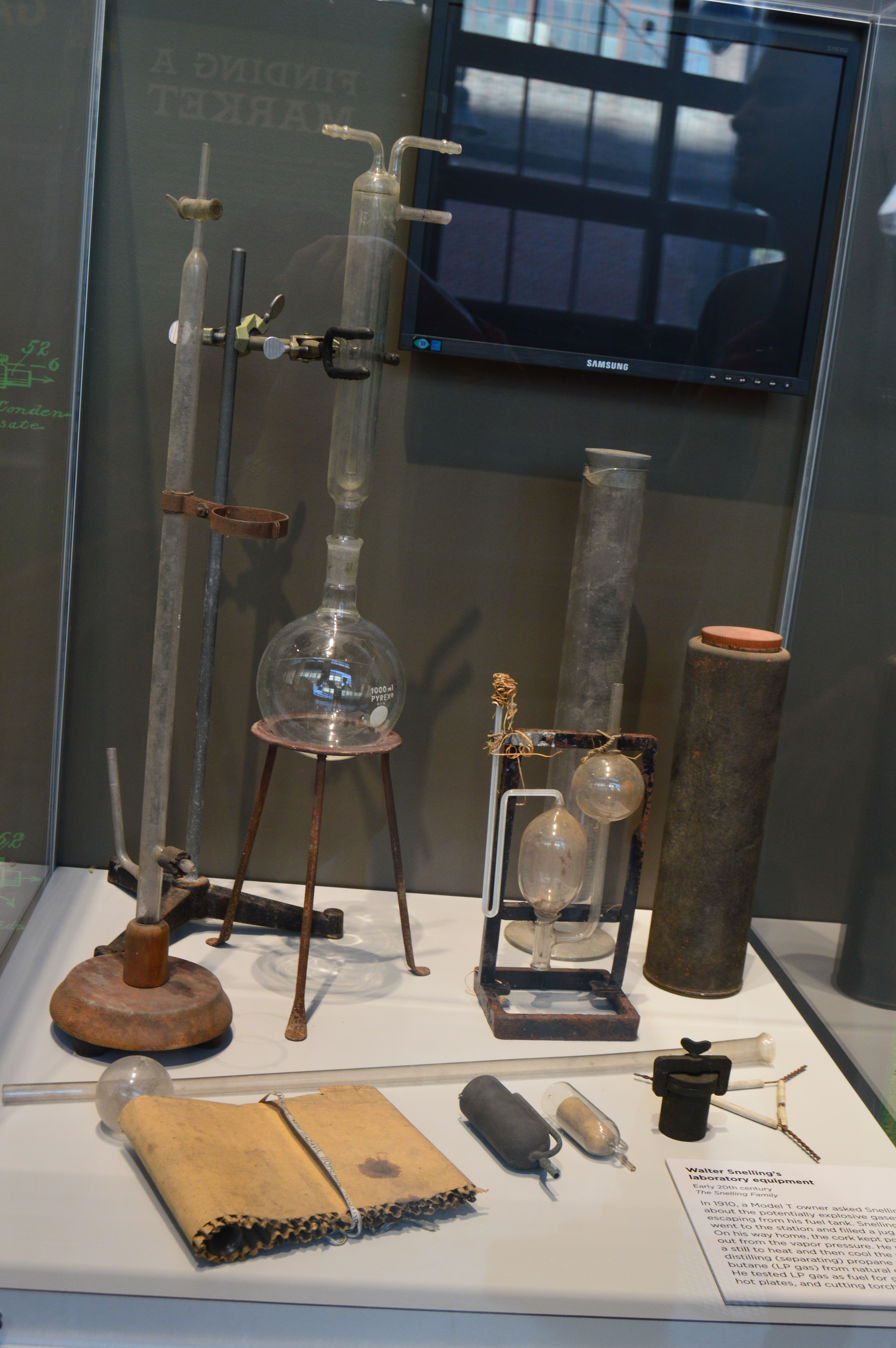
The lab equipment of Walter O. Snelling, who discovered how to distll propane

The Propane Gallery focuses on the workings of Walter O. Snelling, an American chemist from Allentown who discovered how to distill propane. Items from Snelling's laboratory are on display at the museum, including photos from his propane company, American Gasol Co. There is also an educational exhibit showing the propane usage in the country during World War II.

=== Rotating Gallery ===
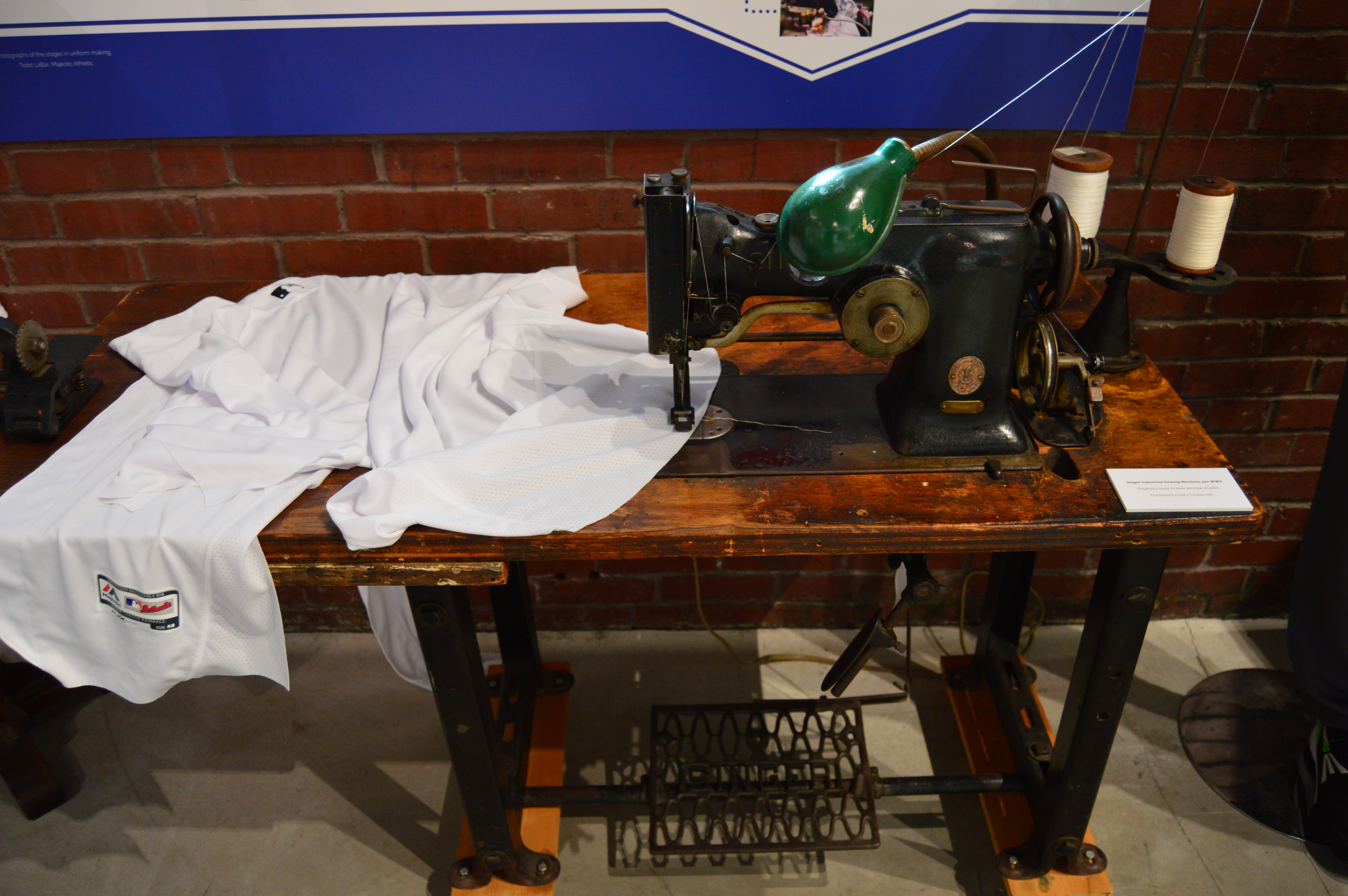
Major League Baseball uniform production

There is a changing gallery at the museum. This gallery holds 3D printers, loaned to the museum by Lehigh University and Northampton Community College. There is a schedule planned for the next year that includes commemorating the 75th anniversary of the "E" for Excellence Award. In 1941, the U.S. Navy gave this award to Bethlehem Steel because of their plant's production of nearly 38,000 ships in support of the war effort.

In May 2017, the museum opened a new exhibit, "Making America's Pastime", which focused on the production of Major League Baseball equipment.

== Artifacts ==
The nearly $7.5 million museum houses over 200 artifacts. One of these is the museum itself, built within the frame of the Steel plant's Electric Repair Shop that ran back in 1913. Within the section involving the 1876 World's Fair, visitors are welcomed by artifacts and machines that were displayed at the Centennial International Exposition. Such machines include massive 19th and 20th century engines and pumps.

After the Centennial International Exposition, most of the machines went directly to the Smithsonian Museum, but the museum has donated several artifacts to Bethlehem's very own. Amy Hollander, executive director of the museum stated in reference to the artifacts, "Among them are some that are the first made, the longest operating or the last produced. These objects are gateways to bigger stories." Amidst first made and last produced include the first piece of steel rolled in Bethlehem and last rolled piece of Class A armor.

The Machinery Hall holds 21 artifacts loaned by the Smithsonian Institution which were previously on display at the National Museum of American History. Items from the 1876 World's Fair in Philadelphia can be found on display in this exhibition. The largest and most prominent artifact in this hall is the 115-ton, 8 MGD, International Steam Pump Company's Snow, Corliss Steam Engine that had pumped water for York, PA beginning in 1914. In addition to the steam engine, the Machinery Hall also boasts a Milwaukee's Pawling & Harnischfeger Co. Crane and an H-beam from Bethlehem Steel. Other artifacts displayed in this hall include original items used by workers such as punch cards, hard hats, whistles, welfare baskets, and safety reports.

The Silk Gallery Hall depicts the history of the Lehigh Valley Silk industry. Within this exhibit, you are greeted by the most prominent artifact, the Jacquard loom. This loom was used in conjunction with the Scalamandre Silk Mill located in Long Island City, New York. It was utilized to produce the fabric for the White House for nearly eighty years up until Bill Clinton's presidency. One particular piece of fabric that was formed for John F. Kennedy holds a place in this exhibit.

The Propane Gallery, features an interactive hot air balloon simulation. Visitors enter a hot air balloon basket, while the simulation describes the use of propane in these aircraft. Glenn Koehler, NMIH's marketing and outreach coordinator believes that the Propane Gallery is the most popular interactive exhibit. Mechanical and digital characteristics such as moving floor boards and aerial video give the viewers a very well rounded, realistic approach to a hot air balloon ride. The educational purpose of this display is to express the widespread use of propane gas.

== Gallery ==
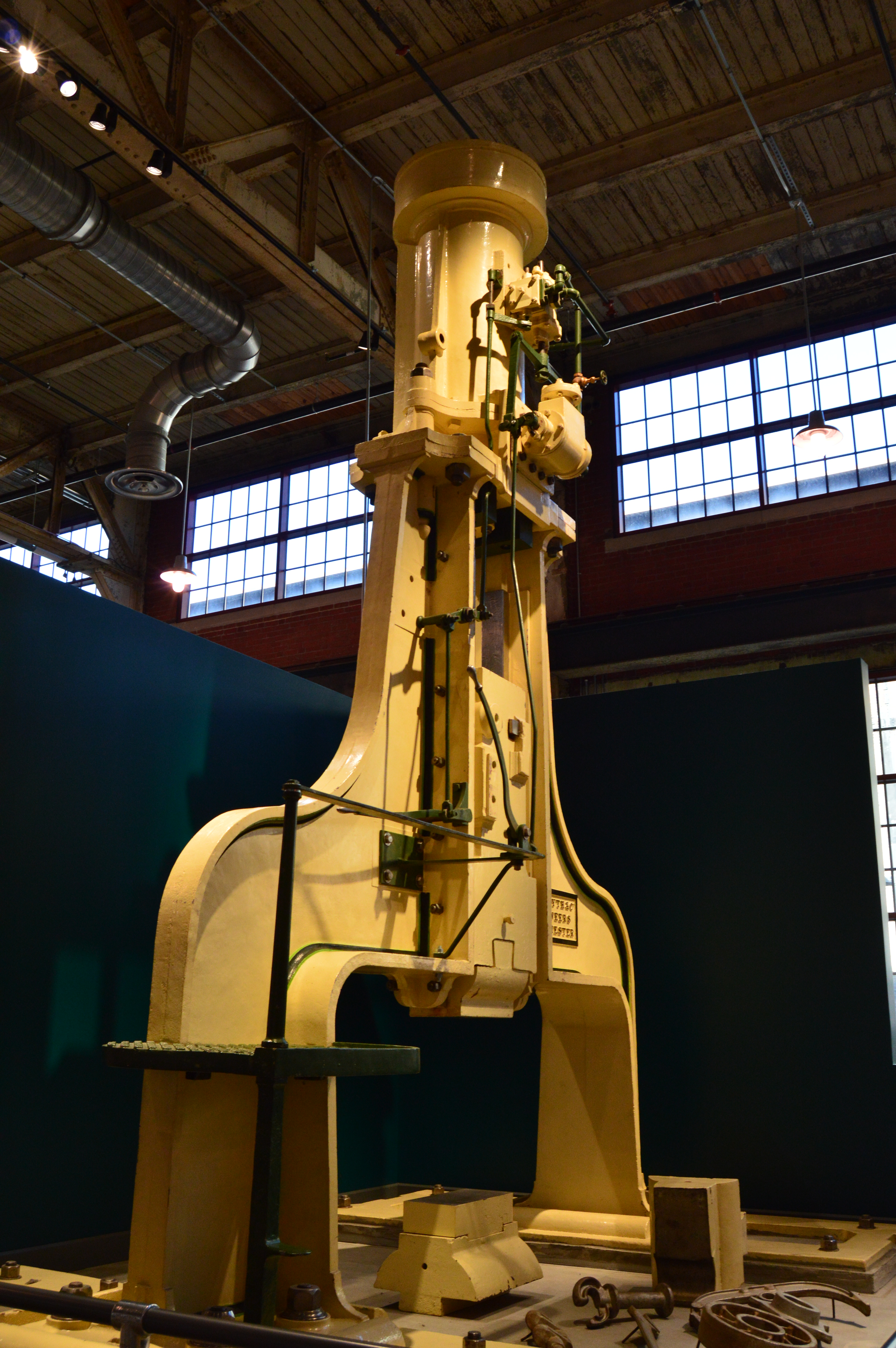
A steam drop forge at the museum

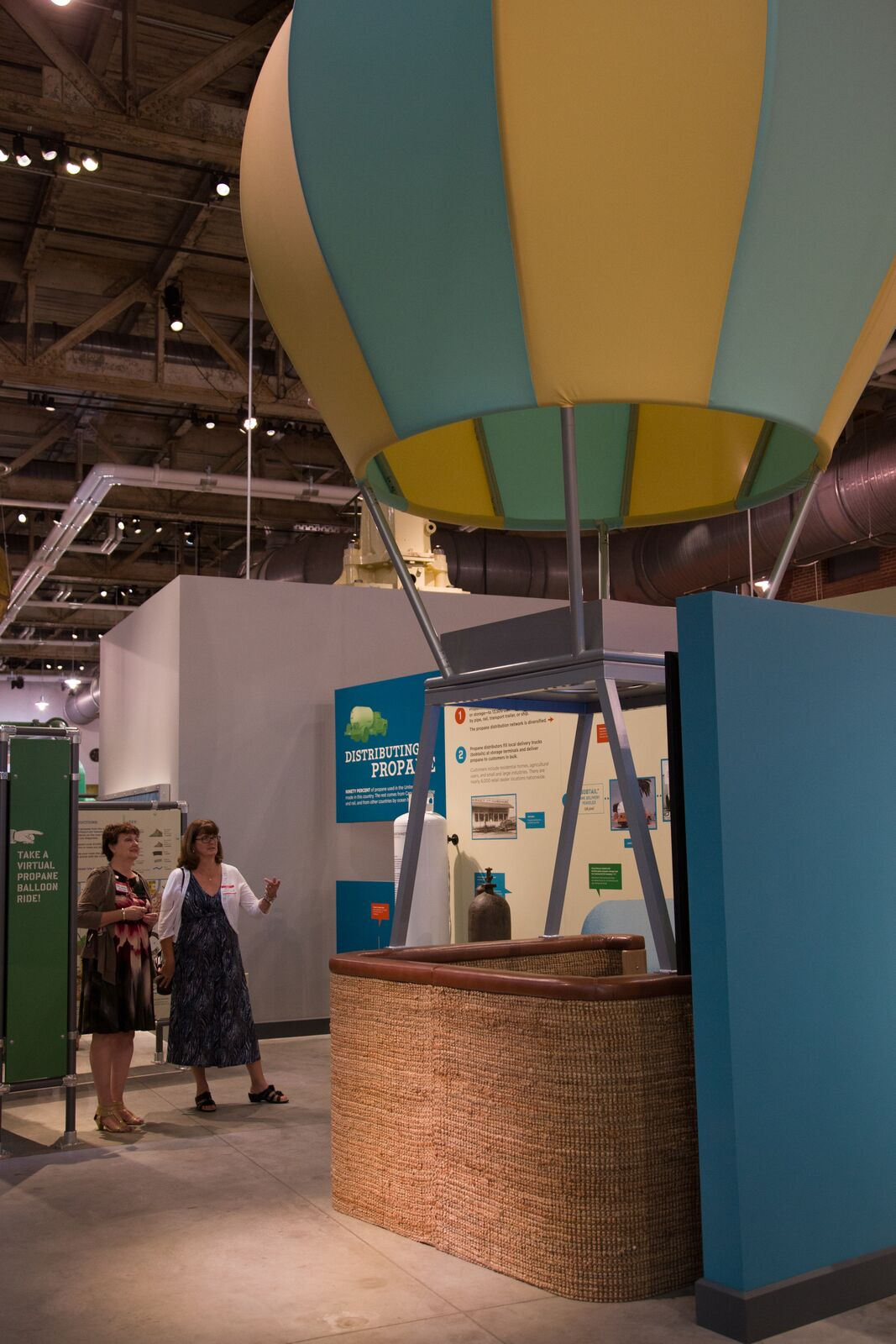
A hot air balloon interactive exhibit

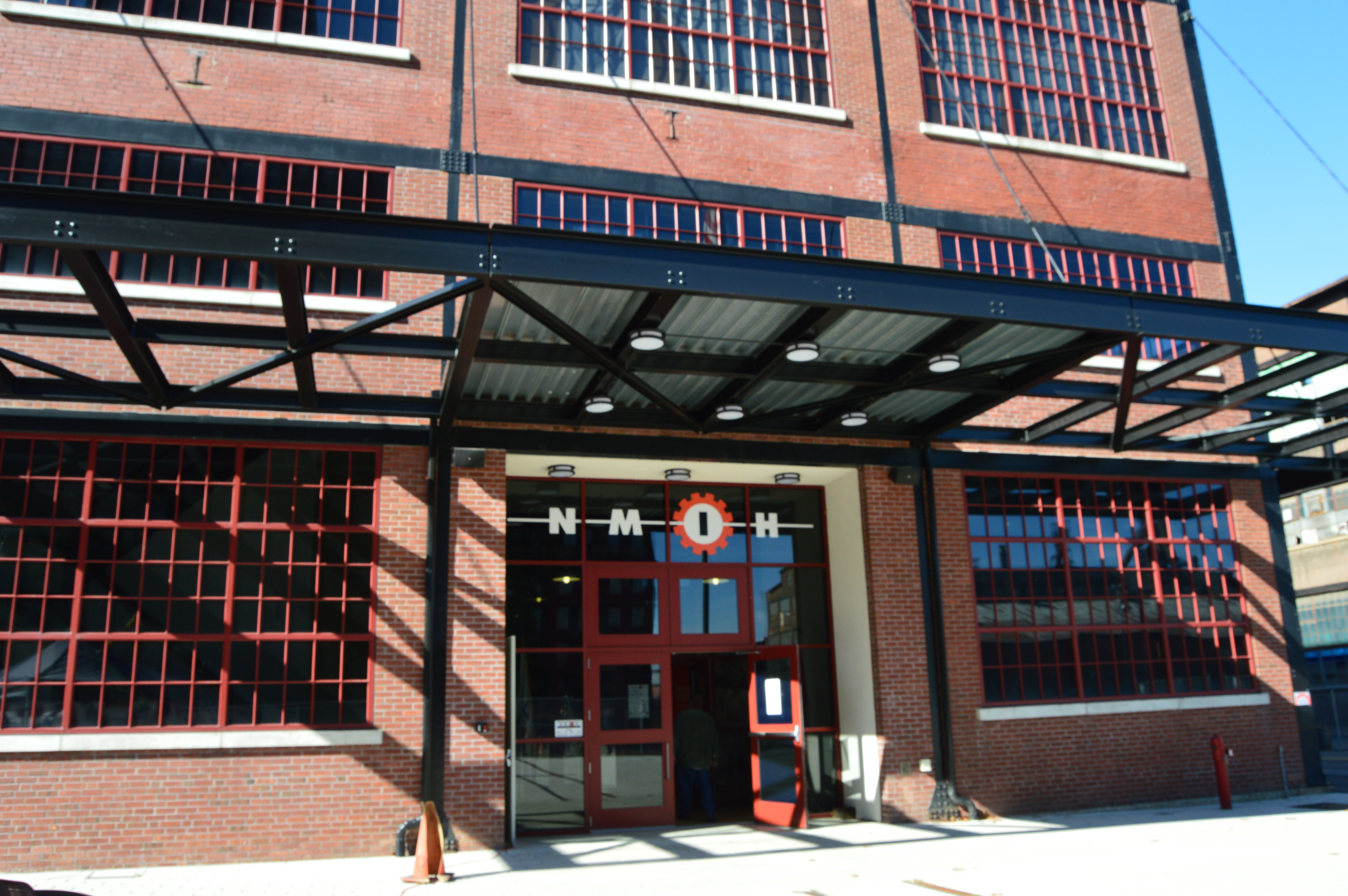
The museum's entrance

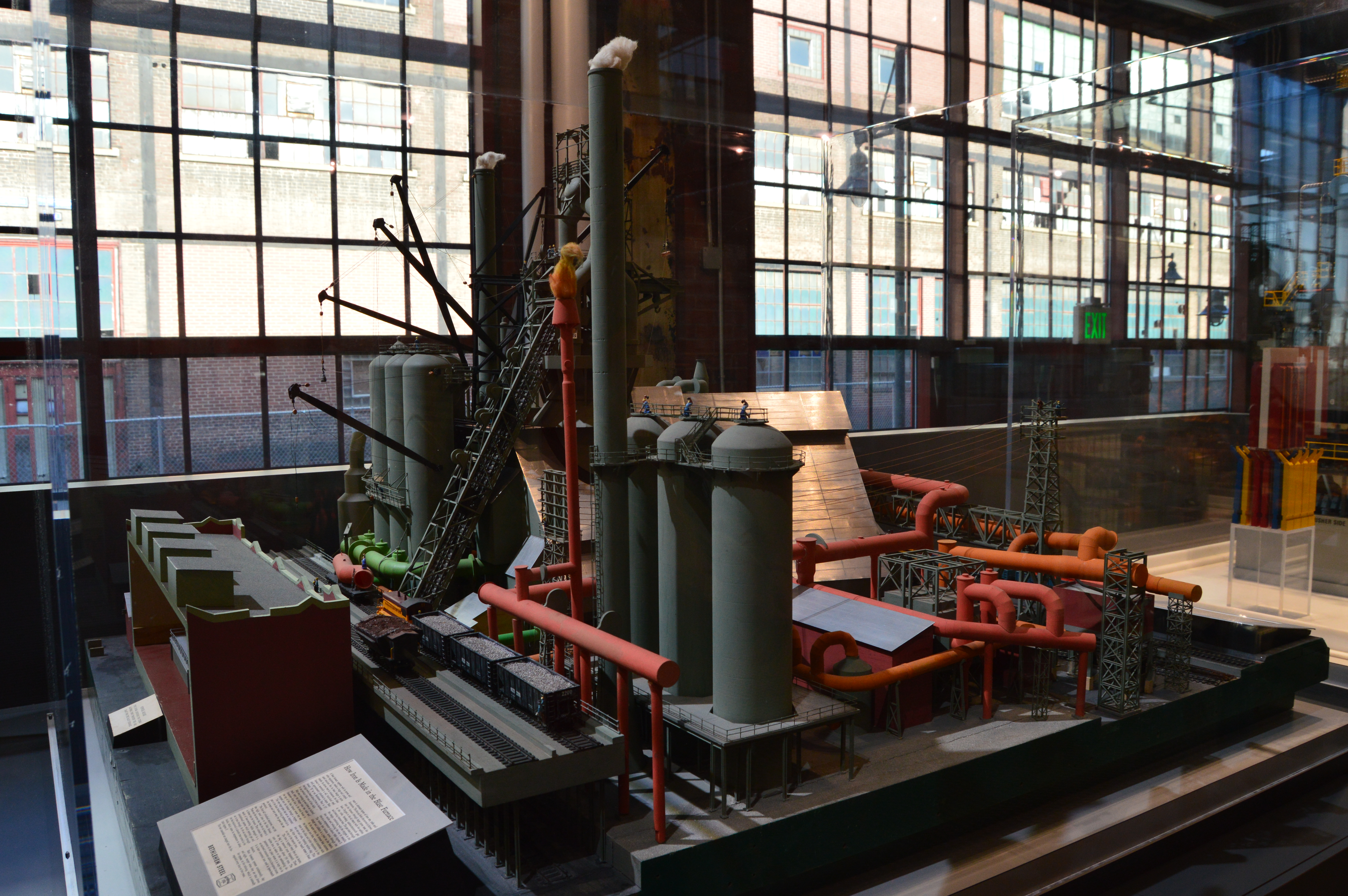
Plant display

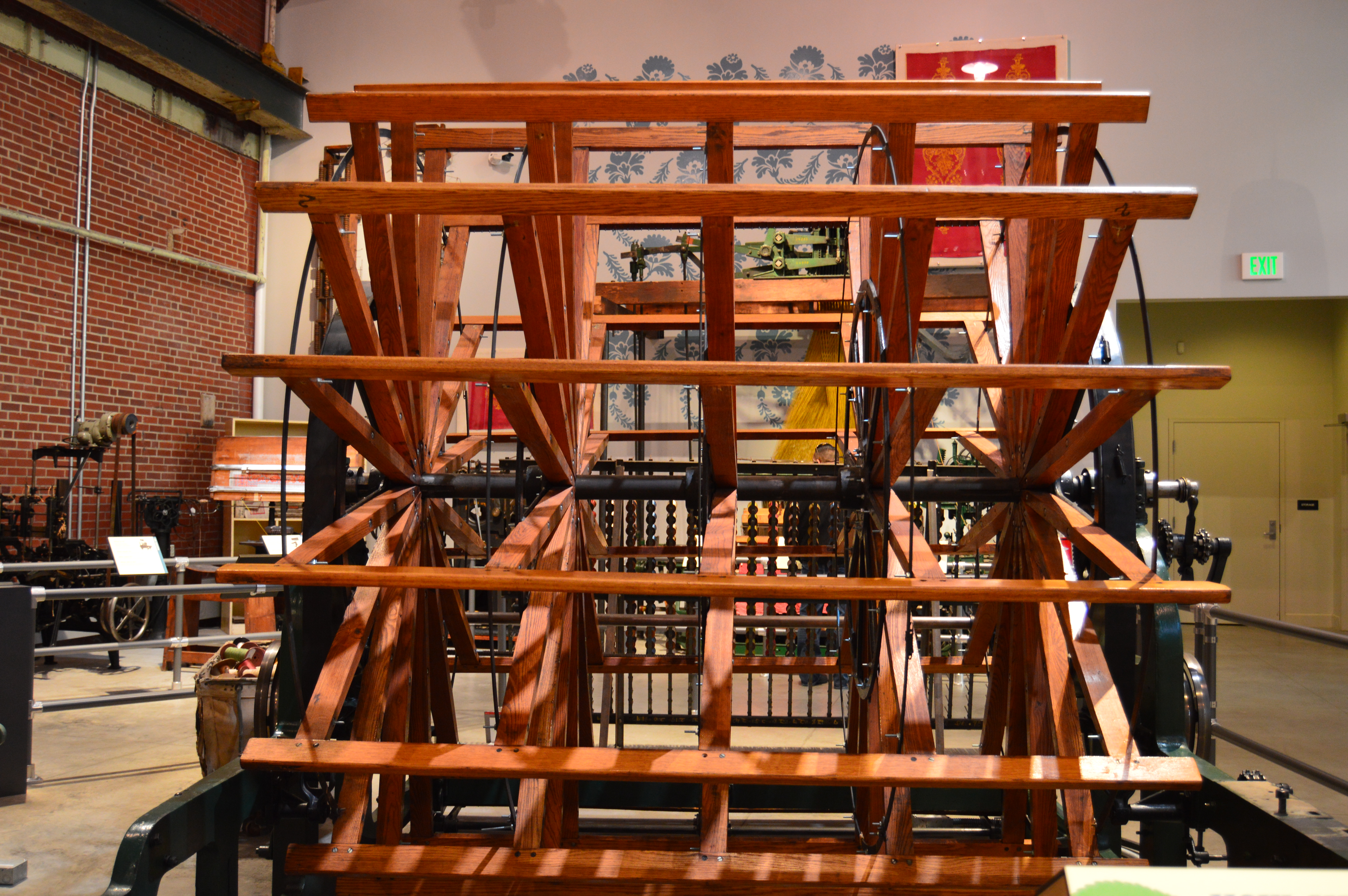
Jaquard loom

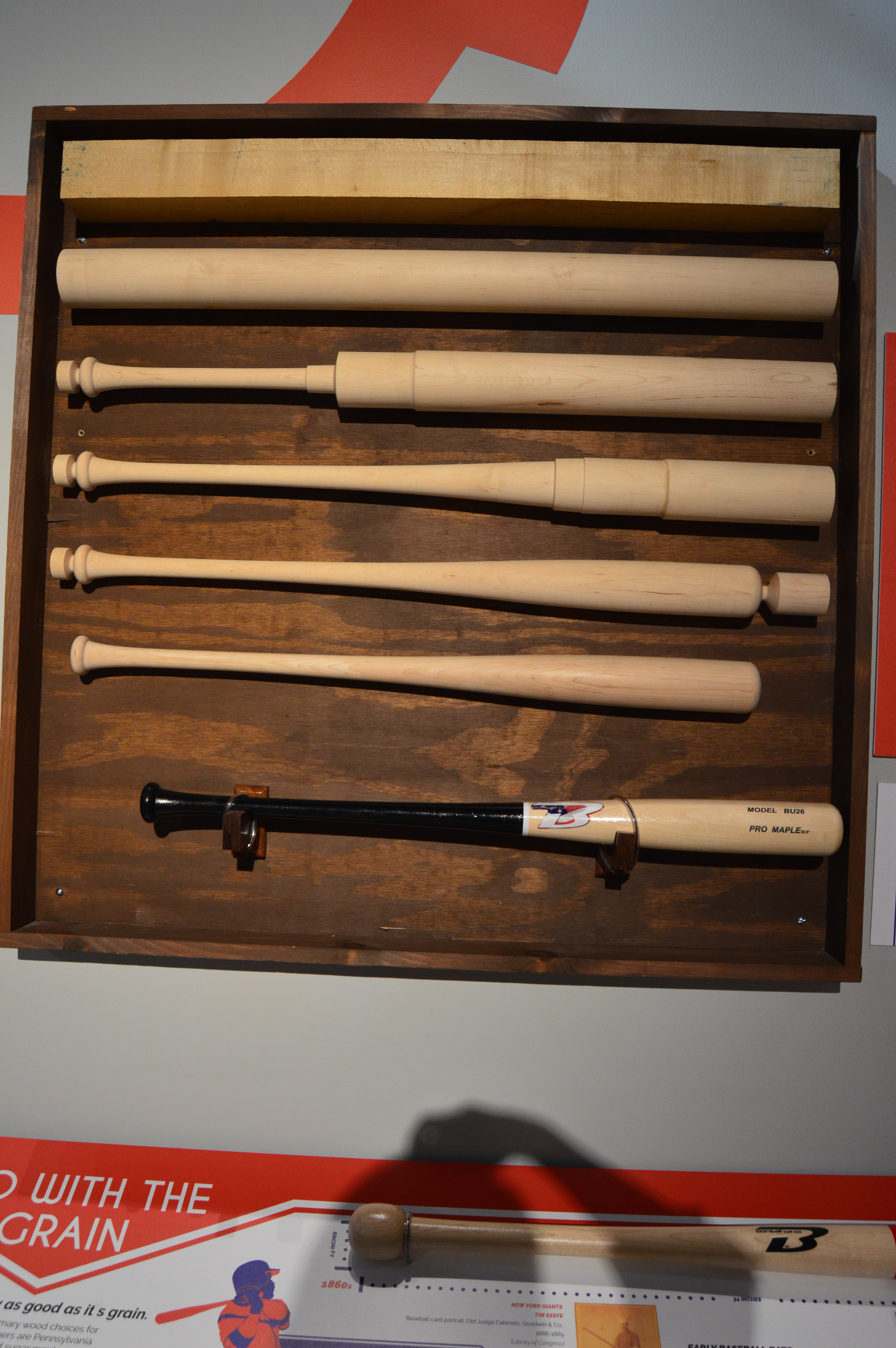
Baseball bat production

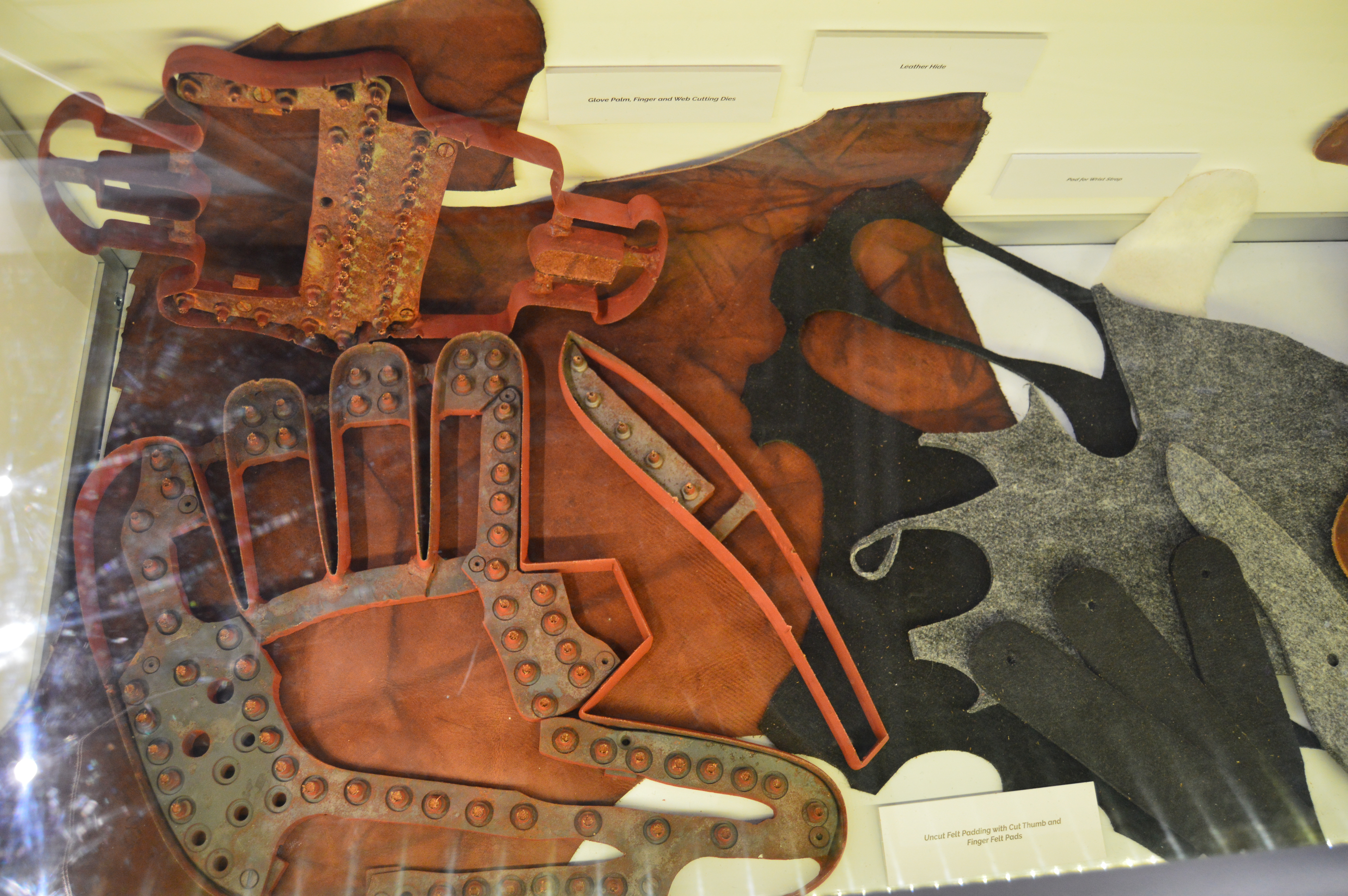
Baseball glove production

== See also ==
- Technological and industrial history of the United States
