= Abraham Bogardus =

American photographer (1822–1908)

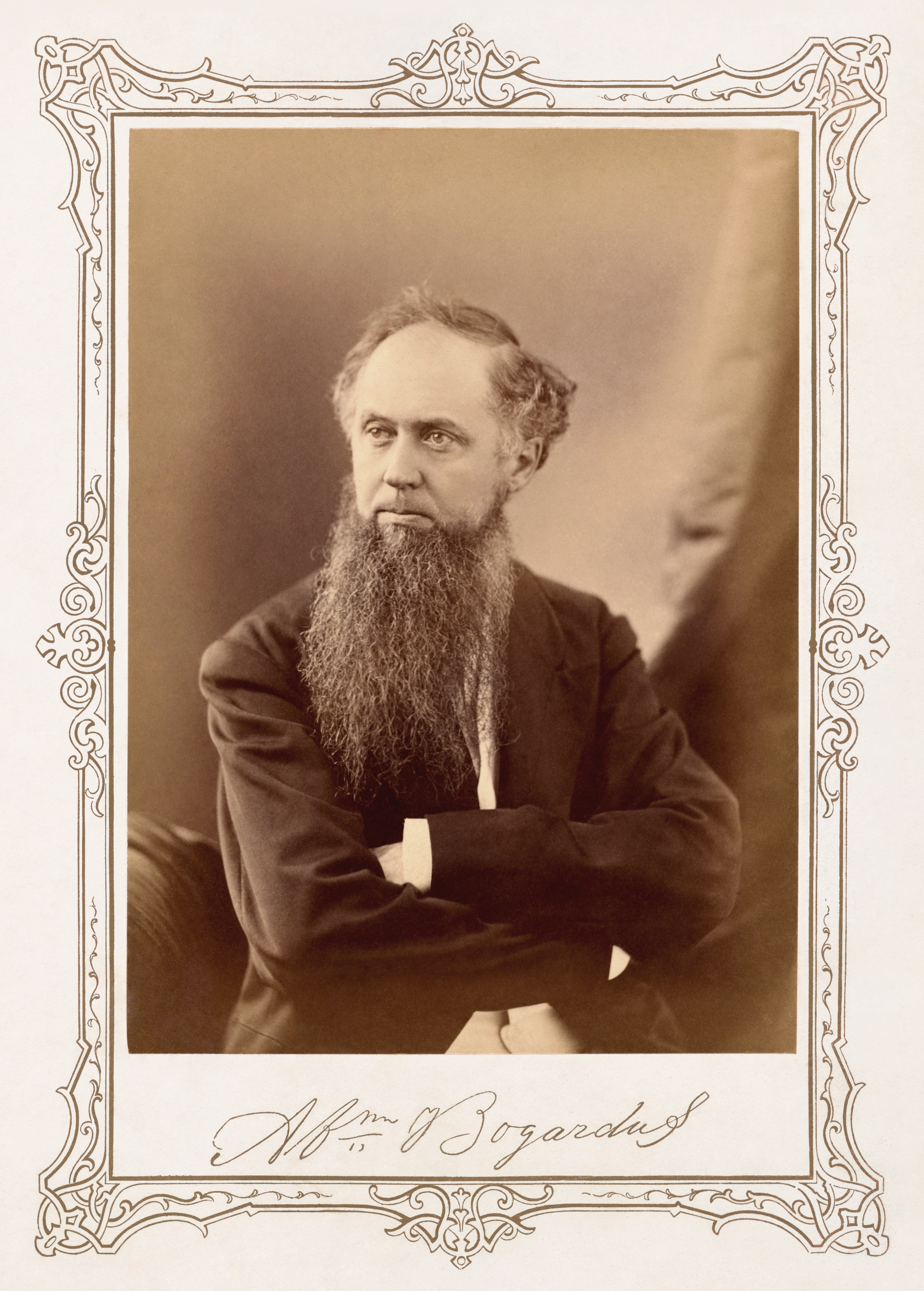
- Self-portrait, 1871, with facsimile signature
- Born: November 29, 1822
- Died: March 22, 1908 (aged 85); Brooklyn, New York

Abraham Bogardus (November 29, 1822 – March 22, 1908) was an American daguerreotypist and photographer who made around 200,000 daguerreotypes during his career.

He was trained in the daguerreotype process by New Yorker George W. Prosch, who in 1839 had made a camera for Samuel F.B. Morse. Bogardus opened a studio and gallery at 363 Broadway in New York in 1846, becoming very successful. In 1868, he helped in the founding of the National Photographic Association of which he was president for five years. He worked as a clerk in a dry goods store in the late 1830s, and exhibited a painting at the American Institute in 1845.

From 1847 to 1852, he was listed as a daguerreotypist at 217 Greenwich Street. His residence was in Newark, New Jersey, from 1849 to 1851, returning to Grove Street, New York City, between 1851 and 1852. His success enabled a branch gallery at 126 Washington Street, Newark, in 1849, which moved to 8 Clinton Street, Newark, in 1850. His New York City gallery was moved to 229 Greenwich Street in 1851 and the old Root Gallery at 363 Broadway refitted in 1862. He opened a new studio at 1153 Broadway in 1869, maintaining the 363 Broadway address.

That same year he became an important witness at the trial of William H. Mumler, a spirit photographer who had been accused of fraud by, among others, P. T. Barnum. Barnum hired Bogardus to fabricate a photograph of him with the supposed "ghost" of Abraham Lincoln; this photograph was then tendered in evidence at Mumler's trial to demonstrate to the court how easy it was to conjure fake images of ghosts.

In 1871 to 1873, he was in partnership with Daniel and David Bendann, brothers from Baltimore, Maryland, at 1153 Broadway in New York. In 1873, Bogardus produced daguerreotypes of bank note designs for the American Bank Note Co.

Wanting to retire in 1884, Bogardus advertised in the Philadelphia Photographer: "Wishing to retire from the photographic business, I now offer my well-known establishment for sale, after thirty-eight years' continuous existence in this city. The reputation of the gallery is too well known to require one word of comment. The stock of registered negatives is very valuable, containing a large line of regular customers, and also very many of our prominent men, Presidents, Senators, etc., and for which orders are constantly received. They include Blaine and Logan. Entire apparatus first-class; Dallmeyer lens, etc. For further information, address Abraham Bogardus & Co., 872 Broadway cor. 18th St., New York."

He died in his home at 246 Madison Street in Brooklyn, NY surrounded by friends in 1908.

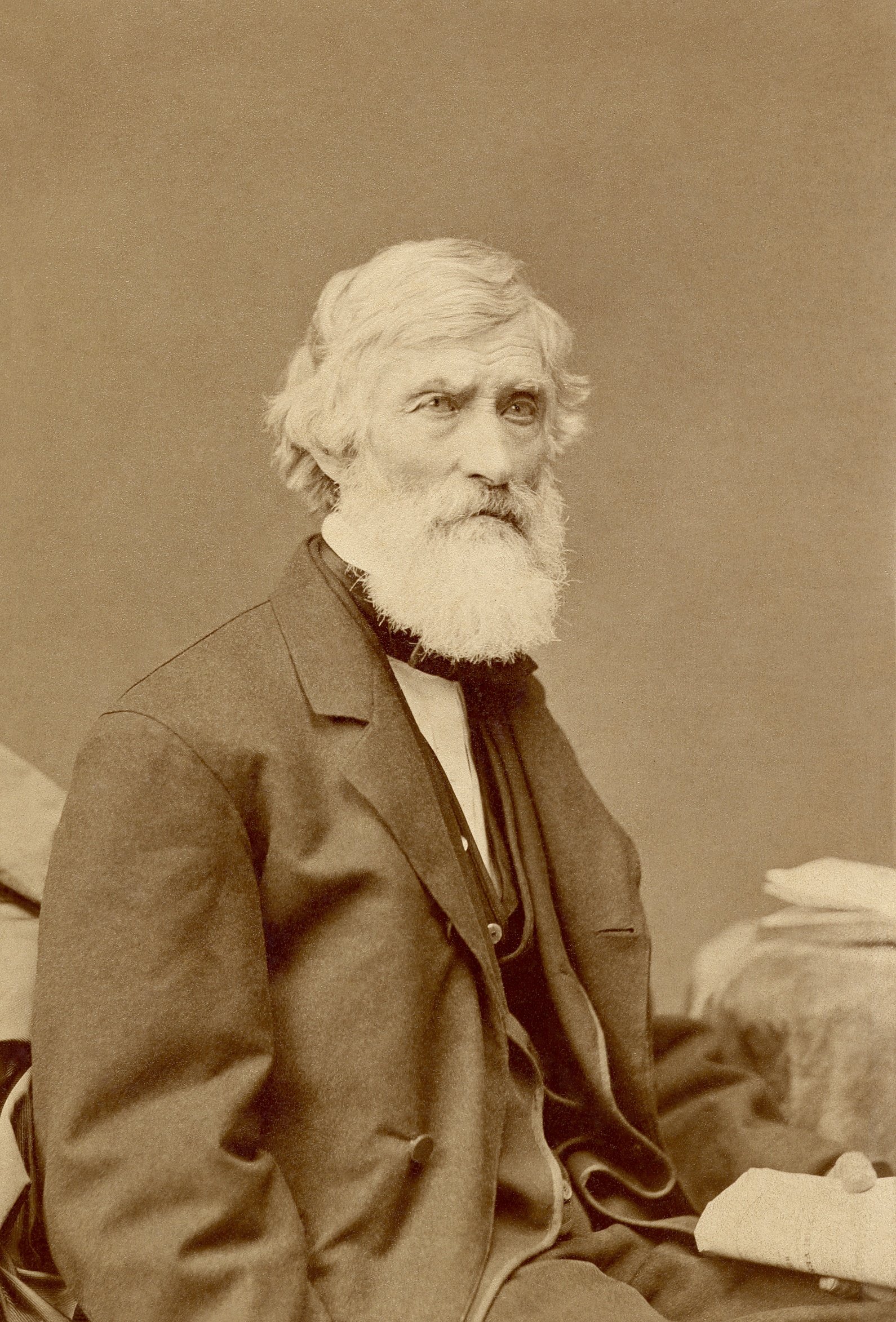
Asher Brown Durand (1869)
by Bogardus

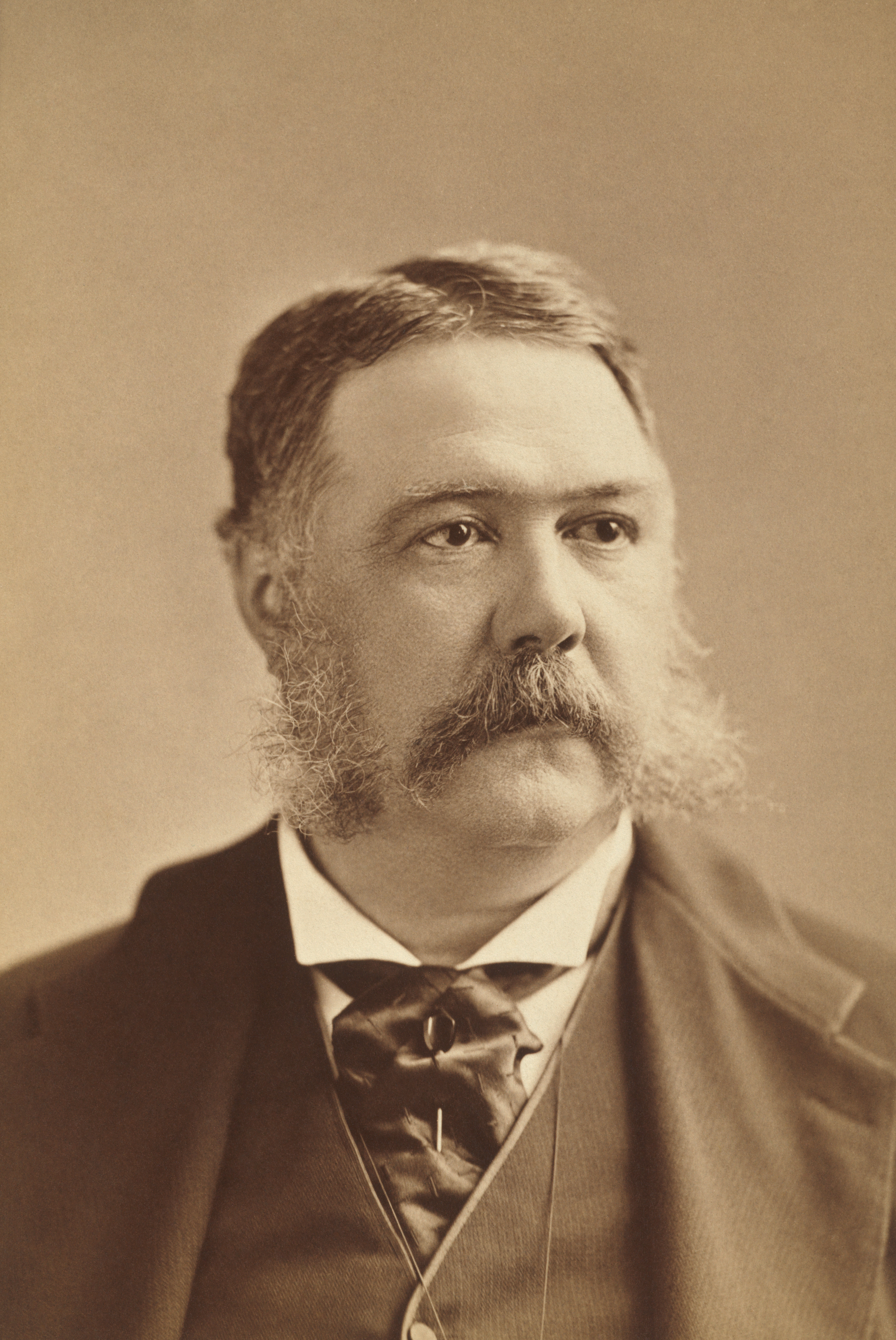
Chester A. Arthur (1880s)
by Bogardus

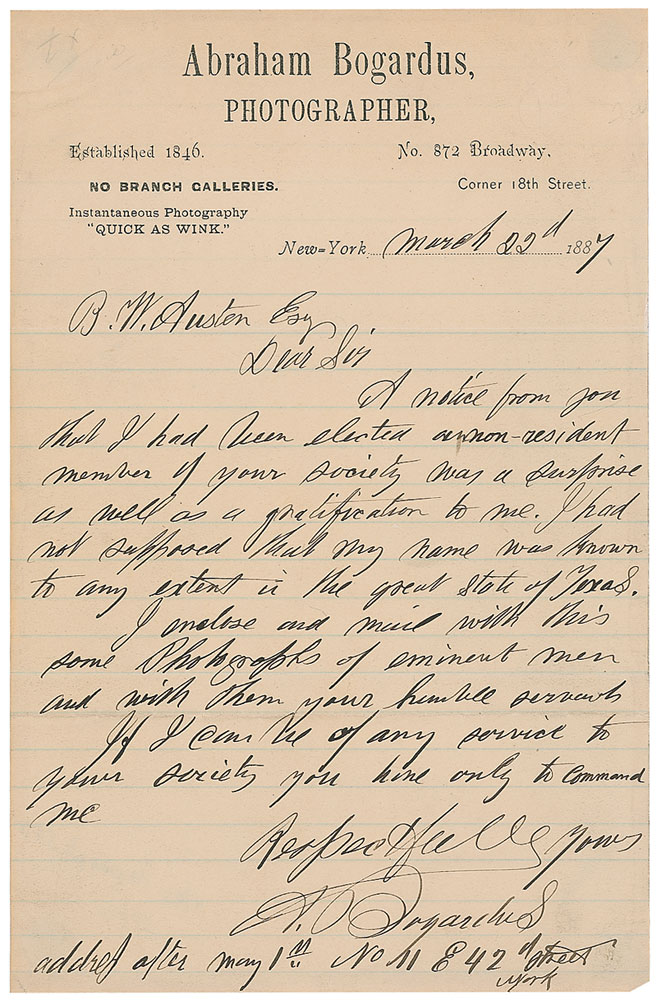
Letter by Bogardus, after being elected as a non-resident member of a society in Texas
