= Charles W. Hornor =

American lawyer

Charles West Hornor (January 4, 1813 – July 8, 1905) was a lawyer and Reconstruction Era political activist who was secretary of the New Orleans Freedmens Aid Association in New Orleans following the end of the Civil War. He worked with Thomas J. Durant, who was also involved with politics and the causes of freedmen and social reform. Louisiana History describes Hornor as among the leading Radical Republicans in New Orleans at the time. Hornor represented Thomas J. Allen in a case before the U.S. Supreme court. He introduced the first female lawyer to ever appear before the U.S. Supreme Court. He received a letter of support from residents in New York for nomination to fill a vacancy on the U.S. Supreme Court after the 1865 death of John Catron. The vacant seat was eliminated by Congress to prevent Democrat Andrew Johnson, who became president after Abraham Lincoln was assassinated, from filling the seat.

== Early years ==
Born in Philadelphia, Pennsylvania, Charles West Hornor descended from an established Quaker family which arrived in 1683 as part of William Penn’s fleet of Quaker settlers. Hornor’s grandfather, Benjamin Hornor, was a founding member of the Pennsylvania Abolition Society in 1784. Quaker moral values were deeply instilled in his family.

Charles West Hornor was born in 1813 to Joseph Potts Hornor and Jane West. After attending schools in Philadelphia, he studied at Nazareth Hall in Nazareth, Pennsylvania, a Moravian boarding school. To his disappointment, he was withdrawn from school at age 16, and put to work in a wholesale dry goods house. At that young age, he already had his sights on becoming a lawyer. After several years, he joined a brokerage firm, experienced the volatility of the market, and finally, in 1836, relocated to New Orleans, Louisiana, to clerk in a bank. New Orleans was becoming the nation’s third largest city and the hub of growing Mississippi River trade. After working in the bank, he moved to an insurance company where he was able to study law under the company’s attorney. He was made an attorney in 1842 at the age of 29.

Hornor married Mary Ellen Talman of New York City, New York, in 1835 and had two children before Mrs. Hornor died of Yellow Fever in 1841. He married Sarah Elizabeth Smith in 1850 with whom he had eight more children.

== Career ==
Once a member of the Bar, Hornor formed a partnership with fellow Philadelphian Thomas J. Durant. They practiced commercial law together in New Orleans until the close of the Civil War. Immediately after the war, Durant moved to Washington DC while Hornor moved to Philadelphia. Hornor joined Durant in Washington DC in 1872, where he practiced law, including trying cases before the Supreme Court, until an advanced age.

Hornor had a lively intellect and after retirement, occupied himself pursuits as varied as studying medicine and translating Georg Wilhelm Friedrich Hegel’s Lectures on Aesthetics from German to English. Alice Lee Moqué was his daughter with his second wife. His grandson was the chemist Walter O. Snelling and his great-grandson was Richard A. Snelling, former governor of Vermont.
