= Alice Lee Moqué =

American traveler, writer, newspaper correspondent, photographer, cyclist and suffragist

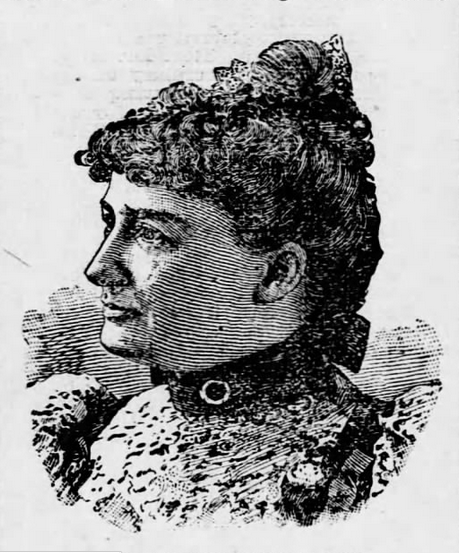
- Born: Alice Lee Hornor; October 20, 1861; New Orleans, Louisiana
- Died: July 16, 1919 (aged 57); Washington, D.C.
- Other name: Alice Lee Snelling
- Occupations: Writer, Traveler, Suffragist
- Known for: Delightful Dalmatia
- Spouse(s): Walter Comonfort Snelling m.(1879–d. 1893); John Oliver Moqué m.(1894–1919)

Alice Lee Moqué (née Hornor; formerly Snelling; October 20, 1861 – July 16, 1919) was an American traveler, writer, newspaper correspondent, photographer, and suffragist. She was also one of the first women cyclists in America.

In addition to newspaper articles on a wide variety of topics, and a novel, she published Delightful Dalmatia (1914), an account of traveling through Dalmatia before World War I. She was elected to the League of American Pen Women in 1915.

== Early life ==
Alice Lee Horner was a daughter of Judge Charles West Hornor, a lawyer and abolitionist from a Philadelphia Quaker family, and his second wife Sarah Elizabeth Smith from Augusta, Georgia. Alice Lee Horner was born in New Orleans during the American Civil War.

There is some confusion over Alice Lee Hornor's birth year. Who's Who for 1916 gives her birth date as October 20, 1865. However, Library of Congress authority records list her birth year as 1863, and the Congressional Cemetery, where her ashes were buried, reports 1861.

The politics of the American Civil War made it difficult for abolitionists like Judge Hornor to practice in the south. His original legal partner in Louisiana, Thomas J. Durant, moved to Washington, D.C., around 1848. After the war, in 1865, the Hornor family also moved, first to Philadelphia, Pennsylvania and later to Washington, DC. There Judge Hornor reestablished his practice with Durant and served before the United States Supreme Court. Alice attended public school at Washington High School in Georgetown.

== Mrs. Walter Comonfort Snelling ==
Alice's first marriage occurred "while in her teens and still a school girl." She married Walter Comonfort Snelling on October 20, 1879, in Washington, D.C. Snelling was an inventor who patented an adding machine. They had three sons, chemist Walter Otheman Snelling, Henry H. Snelling, and Charles Hornor Snelling.

Alice apparently took university classes, including two years of law and three years of medicine. She was interested in chemistry, and became a skilled photographer, doing her own developing and platemaking. By 1890 she was publishing articles on the technique of photography in major photography magazines such as Wilson's Photographic Magazine and The International Annual of Anthony's Photographic Bulletin, as A. Lee Snelling and Alice Lee Snelling. These interests were shared by her son Walter, a chemist who later developed a light-sensitive coating for photographic paper using TNT.

Her first husband, Walter Comonfort Snelling, died on July 1, 1893 in West Chester, Pennsylvania.

== Mrs. John Oliver Moqué ==
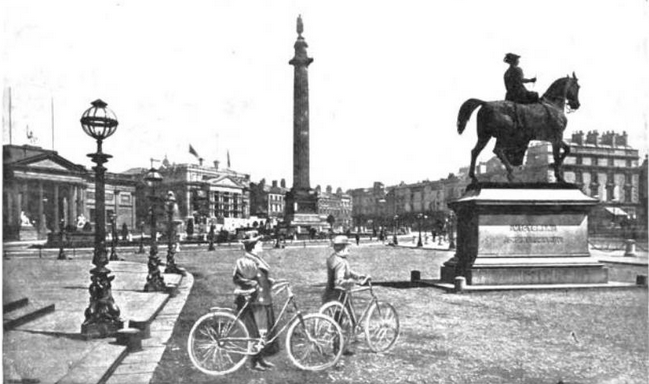
Alice & John Moqué with bicycles, St. George's Square, London

Alice married her second husband, John Oliver Moqué, on June 27, 1894. John Oliver Moqué was born March 26, 1868, to Catherine Araminta Joyce (1837 - 1918) and James E. Moqué. Alice and John Oliver Moqué had a daughter, Voleta Alice Moqué.

Alice became increasingly publicly active after her first husband's death. She joined the American Authors Guild in 1893. She wrote for the newspapers on a wide range of topics from Washington society news and suffrage reports to bicycling and travel.

=== Bicycling ===
Alice Lee Moqué was an avid sportswoman. "An enthusiastic follower of all out door sports, Mrs. Moqué not only skates, rows and cycles, but is an expert swimmer and a fair shot with a rifle." She was one of the first women in America to be a bicyclist, in the face of strong social opposition. With John Oliver Moqué, Alice toured England and the continent "by wheel", publishing accounts of the trip in Outing: An Illustrated Monthly Magazine of Sport, Travel, and Recreation in 1895. She describes the awkwardness of early bicycling costumes for women, which required long skirts.

I would have been absolutely ostracized socially had I dared to appear on the wheel in such cycling garb as I now wear. The bloomered and short-skirted women of to-day, who merrily ride away in freedom and comfort, do not dream of what we of earlier days went through. – Alice Lee Moqué

=== Health and eugenics ===
Alice Lee Moqué was a founding member of the National Congress of Mothers and at one time its vice president. She spoke at the first convocation of the National Congress of Mothers in Washington, D.C., held February 17–19, 1897. The congress was attended by over 2,000 people: "mothers, but also fathers, teachers, laborers and legislators".

Alice spoke on "Reproduction and Natural Law." She asserted that childhood health should no longer be seen as a result of some ineffable divine design but rather as a logical and predictable result of natural laws governing parental health. She advocated for universal health education to promote a higher standard of health. People looking for a prospective mate should assess their "mental, moral and physical status" and suitability as parents. Prospective parents should educate themselves and follow a healthy lifestyle, insofar as it is possible, so as to produce healthy children. Such a duty was owed both to one's children and to society at large. According to this line of reasoning, the health and education of the mother were essential to the health of her children, and women were therefore encouraged to educate themselves and become physically fit. Moqué explicitly states that those who do not wish to become parents should be free not to do so; informed and willing motherhood is hailed as "an intelligent realization of the divine plan of reproduction, a perfect, purposed maternity."

At the second convocation of the National Congress of Mothers in Washington, DC, held May 2–7, 1898, she spoke on "The Mistakes of Mothers".

Alice was the first woman to be invited to address the American Medical Association, which she did at a conference held June 6–9, 1899. Her address, "Restrictive marriage legislation from the standpoint of the wife, mother and home" was printed in The Journal of the American Medical Association." Again, her address dealt with science, society, and eugenics. She criticized "blind conservatism", arguing that "to the student of biology, sociology, and ethnology, the institution we call marriage...is identical in purpose" to mating in the lower animals. She advocated mandatory blood tests before marriage to detect sexually transmitted diseases such as syphilis, which was untreatable and caused horrific birth defects. She asserted that ethicists must someday recognize "rights of the unborn", and supported sterilization if heredity or disease was likely to cause "a crime against progeny".

In her article "An educated maternity", published in The Westminster Review of 1900, it is clear that she looks to science as a means of progressive change and remediation of society's ills.

The true spirit of philanthropic effort recognises the necessity of not only alleviating the evils we have, but the urgent obligation to seek for and discover their cause, that ultimately a cure may be effected, whereby the whole race will be benefited. – Alice Lee Moqué, 1900.

=== Suffrage ===
Alice's ideas about suffrage, health, and eugenics are closely intertwined. Women's health was a goal in itself, a means to a better future through eugenics, and a justification for women suffrage.

Women, as a class, know but little of themselves. Their minds are being freed from the narrow limits formerly fixed by an absurd sex-bias as "women's sphere", and with her enlightened mind has come a wider horizon, and the old fetters that held captive the sex are broken; but her emancipation has not come, and will not come until her education is complete. This education of the future must begin at the beginning with body, and not as is now attempted at the end, with mind. – Alice Lee Moqué, 1900

Alice was energetically involved in the suffrage movement by 1914-1915. Who's Who lists her as the press representative in Washington for the National American Woman Suffrage Association, the press chairman for the Washington Woman Suffrage Council, and the editor of Washington's "Pot Bouille" (the boiling pot) news. This news and suffrage feature was reprinted in publications such as the San Antonio Express, The Farmer and Mechanic and The Tennessean.

Moqué's articles describe in detail a 1914 "Melting Pot" campaign in which the women of Washington donated gold and silver items to be melted down to raise money for the national suffrage campaign. The Washington Herald of March 7, 1917, reports Alice as being "at home" at her new residence at 1641 Harvard Terrace, Washington, D.C., in between suffrage activities including the Mi-Careme Suffrage Ball and Bazaar and a reception at the National American Woman's Suffrage Headquarters at 1626 Rhode Island Avenue.

=== Women in wartime ===
In 1897, Alice was elected the adjutant-general of the newly formed Woman's Cuban League. She felt strongly about the Spanish–American War, wrote patriotic poetry and was quoted in the newspapers.

Her position, then and during World War I, was that a "physically fit, patriotic woman" was capable of serving in the same positions as a man. She noted that nurses had already demonstrated their "nerve, heroism, and fearlessness" in battlefield conditions facing the same risks as men. She exhorted "Columbia's splendid daughters" to take jobs at home as "aeroplane scouts, ambulance drivers, observers, machine gun corps" and others, to enable more men to go to the front. She set an example by serving in the Women's Volunteer Aid of the Motor Corps during World War I.

She was one of the women delegates to the National Security Congress in January 1916, an open forum on national defense.

== Books ==
In addition to numerous articles, Alice published two books under the name Alice Lee Moqué. The Body Master's Daughter (1897) was referred to in The New York Times as a "brilliant and thrilling" novel.

More popular was Delightful Dalmatia (1914), an account of traveling with John Oliver Moqué in Dalmatia before World War I. Alice explains that Dalmatia is their ninth "wedding tour," since they take one "every year". She writes of Dalmatian women: "I'm so glad I wasn't born a Dalmatian – or I feel sure I would be a bomb-throwing, acid-pouring, Croatian suffragette!" Although she portrays herself as somewhat flighty, her descriptions of Dalmatia are careful, detailed, and knowledgeable. That she describes Dalmatia just prior to the first World War adds extra interest to her account. The book is illustrated throughout with her photographs, in spite of military prohibitions against taking pictures in many of the places they visited. It "had a great success as one of the war books of the year".

A member of the American Authors Guild since 1893, Alice was elected to membership in the League of American Pen Women in May 1915. She was awarded a medal by the Société Académique d'Histoire Internationale.

== Death ==
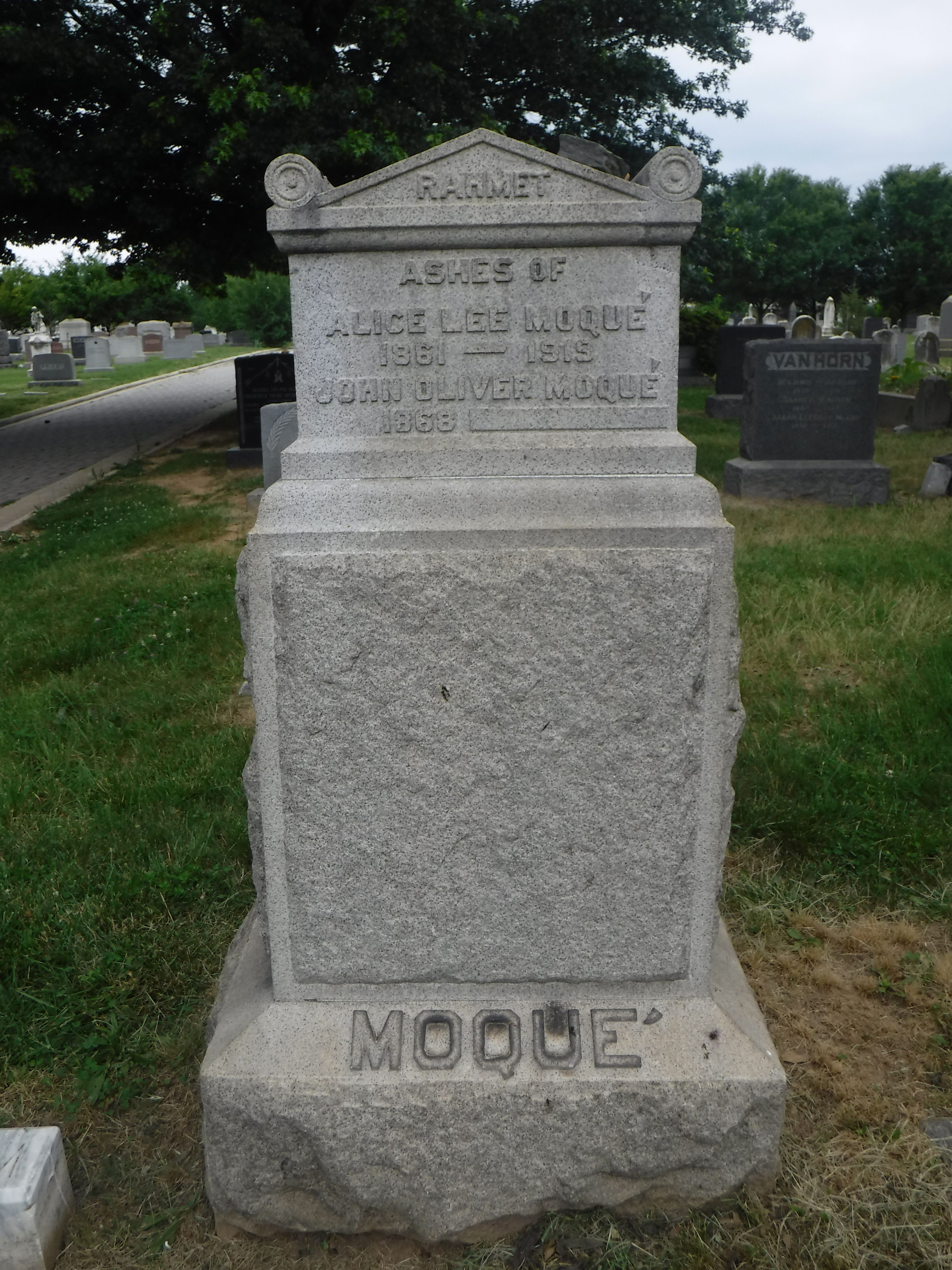
Alice Lee Moqué gravestone, Washington's Congressional Cemetery

Alice died on July 16, 1919 of complications following a broken leg. A funeral service was held on July 18, 1919. She had planned her own funeral rites and requested cremation. Her ashes were interred in plot R61/261 of Washington's Congressional Cemetery on August 23, 1919. To her sons Walter and Henry, who were already independent adults, she left $100 each. The balance of her estate went to her second husband, John Oliver Moqué.

John Oliver Moqué later married Mary Ida Cole. He died on January 13, 1942. Although his name and birth year were listed on Alice Lee Moqué's headstone, he was buried with Mary Ida Cole in Fort Lincoln Cemetery in Brentwood, Maryland.
