= William H. Mumler =

American photographer (1832–1884)

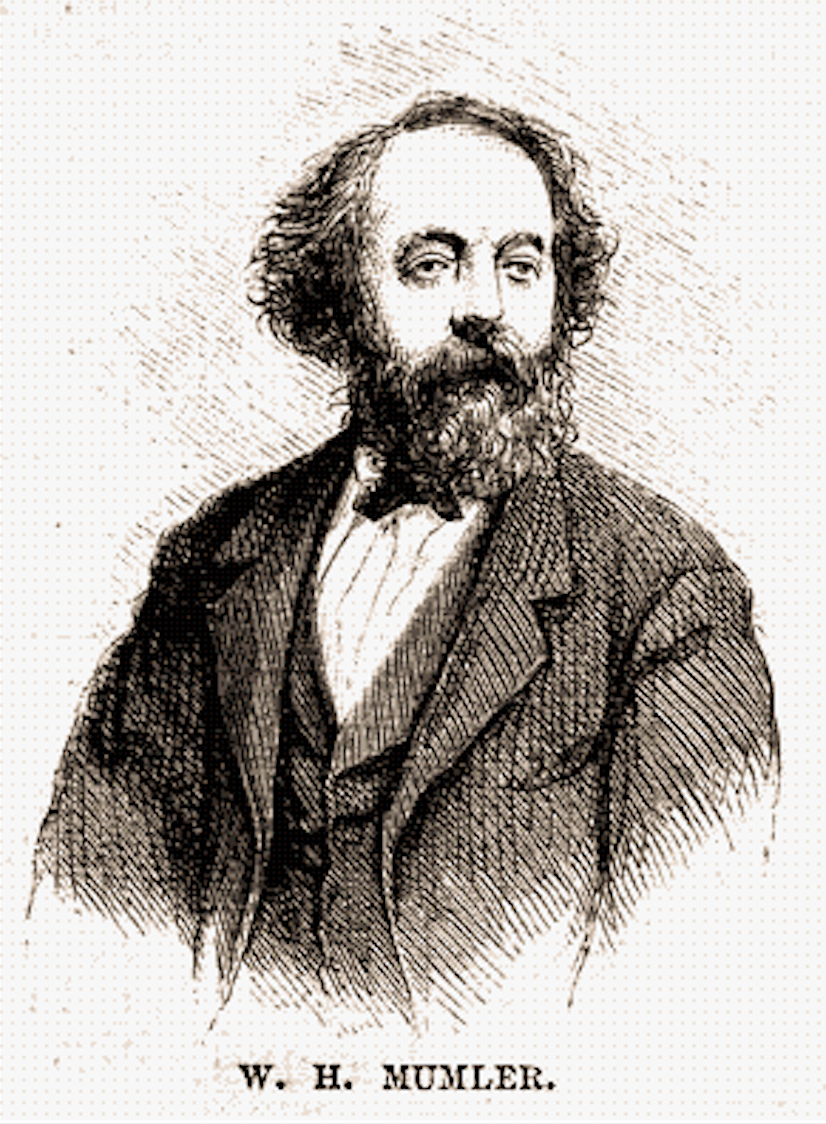
- A May 1869 engraving illustration of Mumler in Harper's Magazine
- Born: 1832
- Died: 1884 (aged 51–52)
- Occupation: Photographer
- Known for: Spirit photography

William H. Mumler (1832–1884) was an American spirit photographer who worked in New York City and Boston producing photos which showed a living person posed with shadowy or translucent human image that was promoted as the spirit of ghost of a deceased person.

Mumler's first spirit photograph was apparently an accident—a self-portrait which, when developed, also revealed what he claimed was the spirt of his deceased cousin. Mumler then left his job as an engraver to pursue spirit photography full-time, taking advantage of the large number of people who had lost relatives in the American Civil War. His two most famous images are the photograph of Mary Todd Lincoln with the ghost of her husband Abraham Lincoln and the portrait of Master Herrod, a medium, with three spirit guides. Mumler was eventually taken to court and tried for fraud and larceny. Noted showman P. T. Barnum testified against him. He was later acquitted by a judge, and his photography career continued.

Mumler's photographs are recognized as fakes but they circulated widely during the last quarter of the 19th century and were marketed as objects of belief and visual curiosities both within and beyond the spiritualist movement. He later discovered a process, called the "Mumler Process", by which photo-electrotype plates could be produced and printed more easily.

== Biography ==
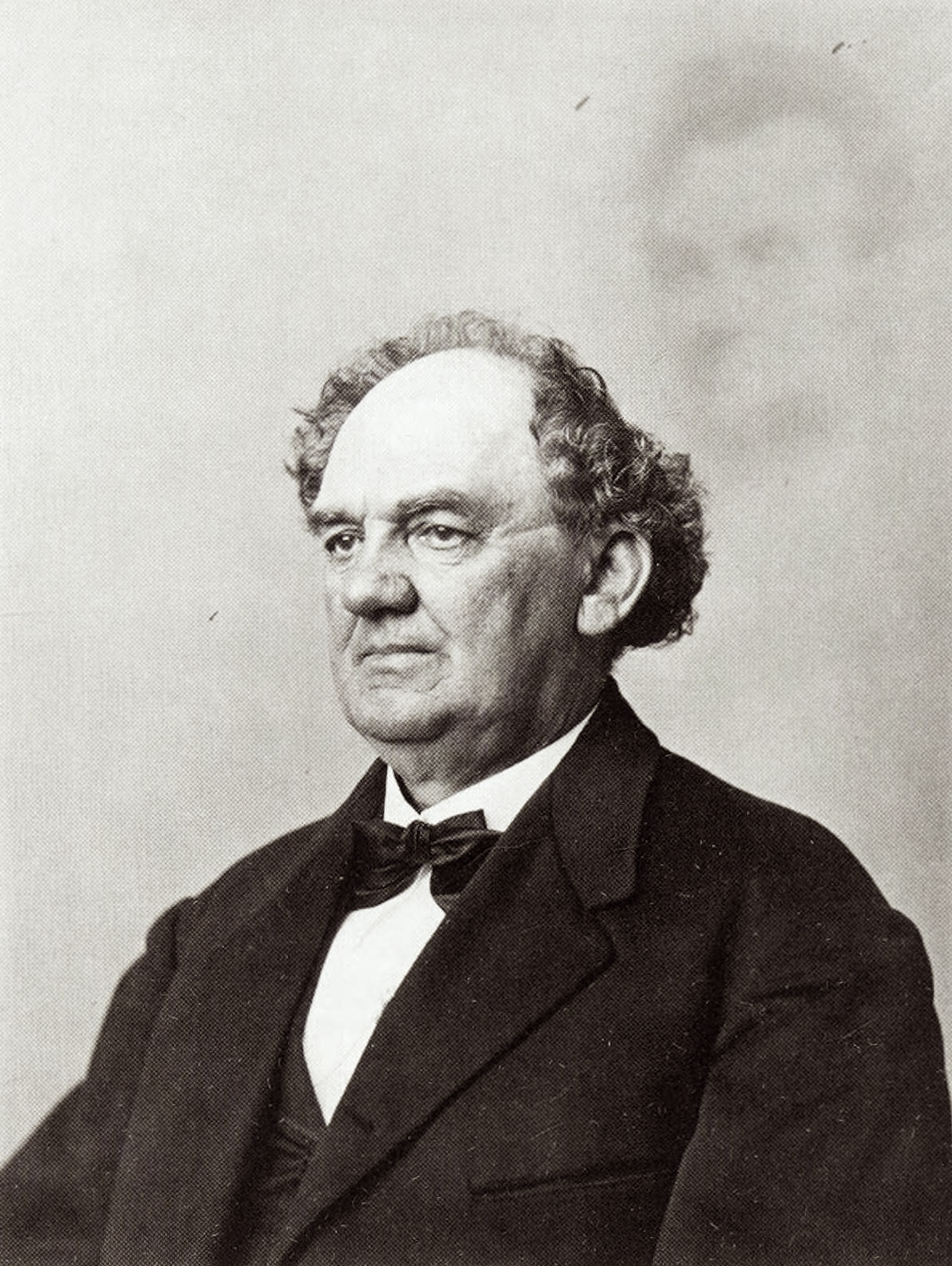
P.T. Barnum hired Abraham Bogardus to fabricate this photo of Barnum and the 'ghost' of Abraham Lincoln. This picture was then tendered in evidence at Mumler's trial for fraud to show how easy it was to forge spirit photographs.

Before beginning his career as a spirit photographer, Mumler worked as a jewellery engraver in Boston, practicing amateur photography in his spare time. In the early 1860s, he developed a self-portrait that appeared to feature the apparition of his cousin who had been dead for 12 years. This is widely credited as the first spirit photograph—a photograph of a living subject featuring the likeness of a deceased person (often a relative), supposedly imprinted by the spirit of the deceased. Mumler then became a full-time spirit photographer, continuing to work in Boston but eventually moving to New York City, where his work was analyzed by numerous photography experts, none of whom could find any evidence of fraud. Spirit photography was a lucrative business thanks to the enormous death tolls that resulted from the American Civil War, and the thousands of families who sought reassurance that their loved ones live on after death.

Mumler's wife, Hannah Mumler, was also a famous healing medium, and conducted her own spiritual business in addition to the business of assisting her husband.

Critics of Mumler's work included P. T. Barnum, who claimed that Mumler was taking advantage of people whose judgment was clouded by grief. Barnum's accusation was one of many in a chorus of voices that had accused Mumler of staging ghosts of people who were still in fact living, and breaking into houses to steal photos of deceased relatives. According to Joe Nickell "Mumler was exposed as a fraud when people recognized that some of the supposed spirits were still among the living." Mumler was eventually brought to trial for fraud in April 1869. Barnum testified against him, having hired Abraham Bogardus to create a picture that appeared to show Barnum with the ghost of Abraham Lincoln to demonstrate the ease with which such spirit photographs could be created. Those testifying in support of Mumler included Moses A. Dow, a journalist whom Mumler had photographed. Ultimately Mumler was acquitted because the prosecution could not prove beyond all doubt that he was fabricating the photographs. Following the trial, some sources reported that he was disgraced and died penniless, while others state that his business became even more successful, due to the publicity of the trial.

Mumler continued working in photography, and later discovered a process by which photo-electrotype plates could be produced and printed as easily as woodcuts (known as the "Mumler Process"). He died on May 16, 1884, and his obituary focused on his photographic contributions in general, making only a passing reference to the earlier spirit photography scandal in the last line. ("The deceased at one time gained considerable notoriety in connection with spirit photographs.")

== Photographs ==
=== Ghost of Abraham Lincoln ===
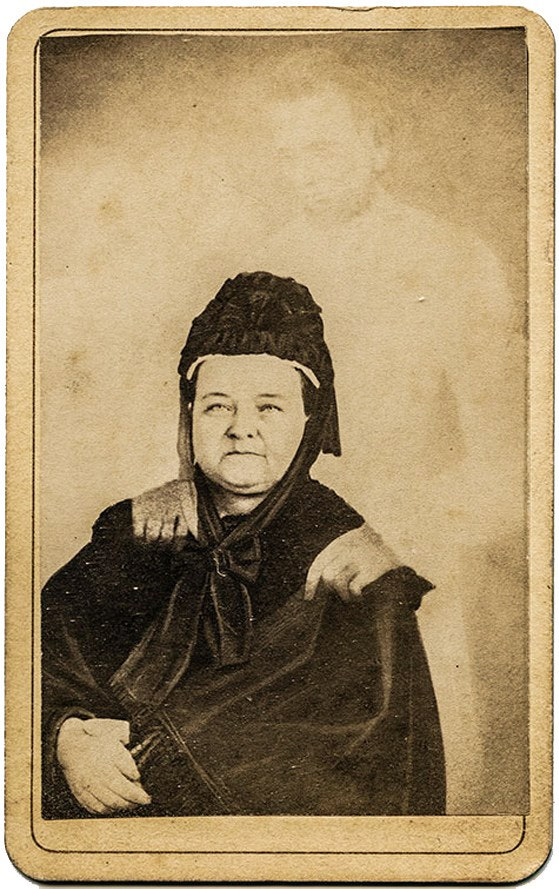
Mary Todd Lincoln with the "ghost" of her husband.

Mumler's most famous photograph apparently shows Mary Todd Lincoln with the "ghost" of her husband, Abraham Lincoln. Paranormal researcher Melvyn Willin, in his book Ghosts Caught on Film, claims that the photo was taken around 1869, and that Mumler did not know that his sitter was Lincoln, instead believing her to be a 'Mrs Tundall'. Willin goes on to say that Mumler did not discover who she was until after the photo was developed. The College of Psychic Studies, referencing notes belonging to William Stainton Moses (who has appeared in photographs by other spirit photographers), claim that the photo was taken in the early 1870s, that Mrs. Lincoln assumed the name of 'Mrs. Lindall,' and that she had to be encouraged by Mumler's wife (a medium) to identify her husband on the photo. Although the image has been dismissed as a fraudulent double exposure, it has been widely circulated. In a letter to the Boston Record, Mumler claimed the photograph had been taken in late February 1872.

=== Master Herrod ===
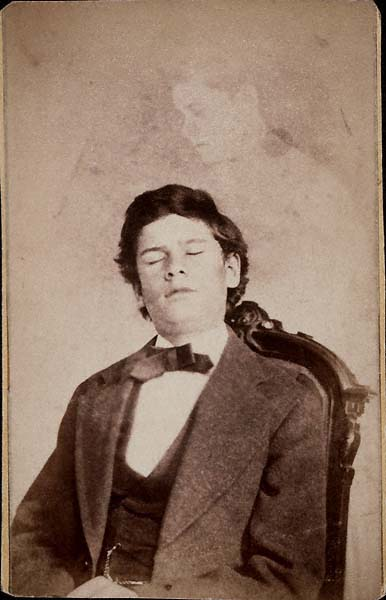
An image of Herrod with a single "ghost".

Master Herrod was a young medium from Bridgewater, Massachusetts photographed by Mumler in about 1872. One photograph, once developed, apparently showed Herrod in a trance surrounded by the spirits of Europe, Africa and America. The photograph was advertised for sale in The Religio-Philosophical Journal on August 24, 1872.

=== Other photographs ===
Other photographs by Mumler included pictures showing various spirits (including relatives, fiancés, actresses and spirit guides) with living sitters. Other well-known sitters include Moses A. Dow, editor of The Waverley Magazine, whose photograph apparently showed the spirit of his assistant Mabel Warren, and Fanny Conant, a well-known medium from Boston, apparently photographed with the ghost of her brother Chas.

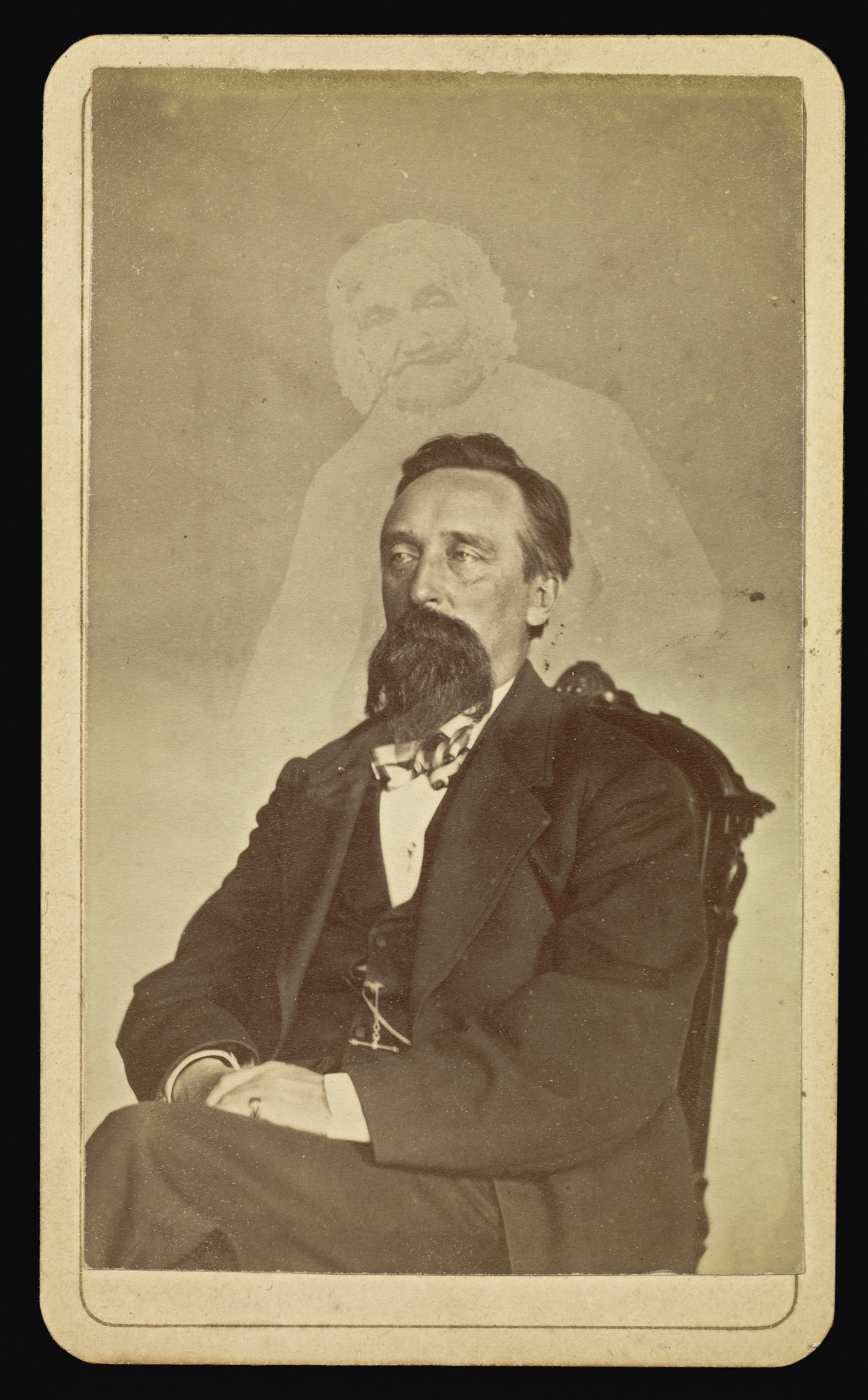
John J. Glover with "ghost" of old lady

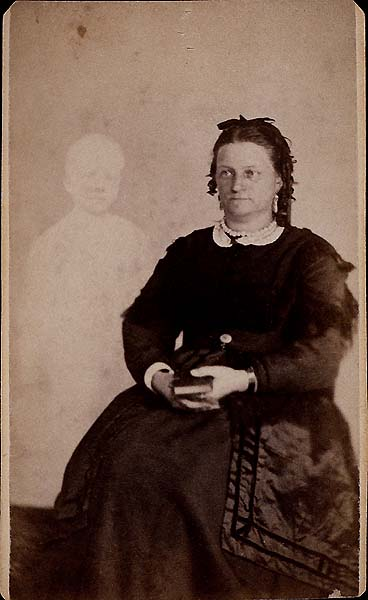
Mrs. French with a child "ghost"

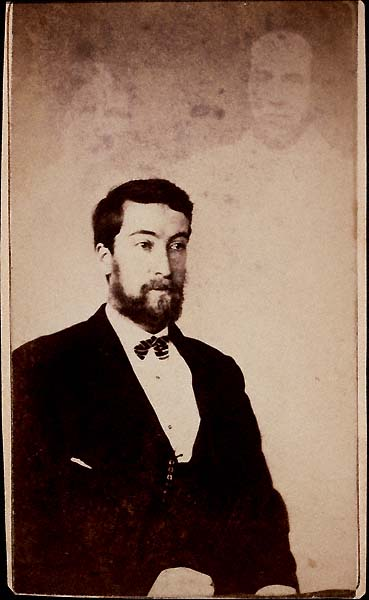
An unidentified subject with two "ghosts"

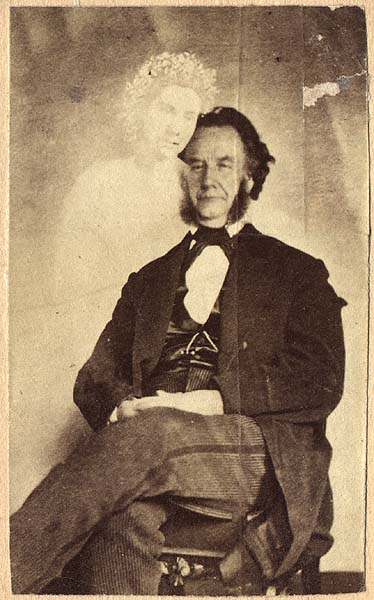
Moses A. Dow with the "ghost" of his assistant

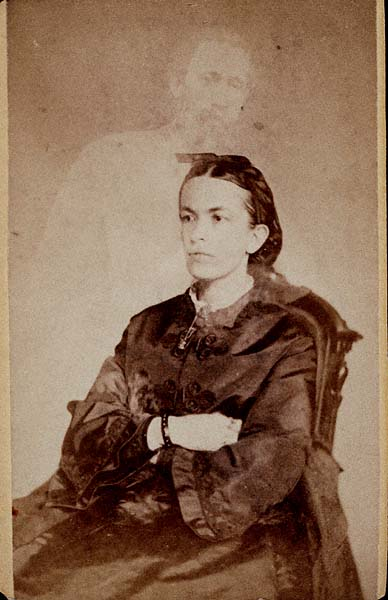
Fanny Conant with the "ghost" of her brother
