= Edward Livingston Wilson =

American photographer, writer, and publisher (1838–1903)

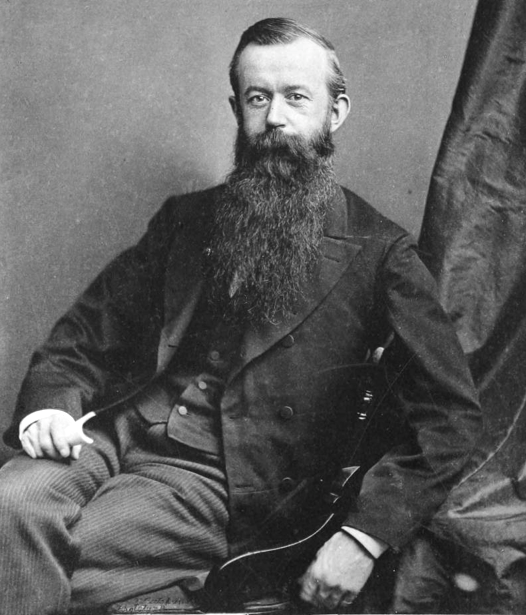
Portrait of Wilson by Frederick Gutekunst, 1881

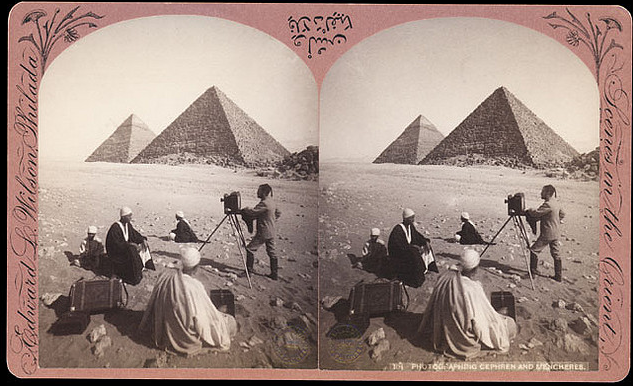
Wilson in Egypt, ca.1882

Edward Livingston Wilson (1838–1903) was an American photographer, writer and publisher. In Philadelphia in the 1860s he worked for Frederick Gutekunst and in 1864 he began the Philadelphia Photographer magazine. He served as an energetic officer of the National Photographic Association of the United States. In 1869 he joined the "Eclipse Expedition" in Iowa overseen by Henry Morton, and in 1881 travelled to the Middle East. In New York City he published Wilson's Photographic Magazine starting in 1889. Collaborators included Michael F. Benerman and William H. Rau. Readers included Edward S. Curtis.
