= New Orleans Freedmens Aid Association =

The New Orleans Freedmens Aid Association was a fraternal benevolent society for freedmen, established seven months after the end of the American Civil War in New Orleans. The first group of its kind in the area, it helped with burial services and life insurance. This type of organization helped establish traditional second lines celebrations in New Orleans.

== See also ==
- Freedmen's Aid Society
