= Daniel Bendann =

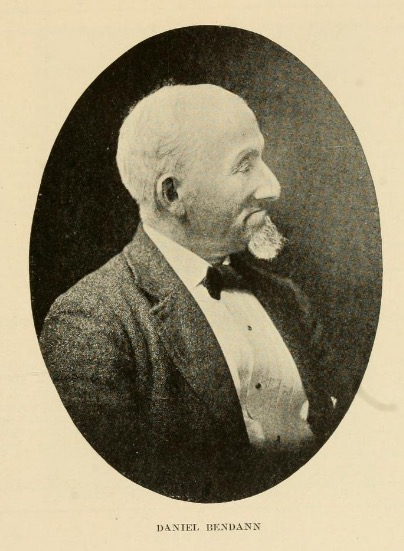
- Daniel Bendann c. 1910
- Born: 1836; Germany
- Died: December 6, 1914 (aged 77–78); Baltimore, Maryland
- Occupation: Photographer
- Known for: Bendann Brothers Backgrounds

Daniel Bendann (1836 - December 6, 1914) along with his brother David Bendann were American Civil War Era photographers known for their elegant photographic backgrounds. Daniel founded their gallery, Bendann Brothers, in 1859 and it remains in the family as of 2019, considered Baltimore's oldest gallery.

The brothers were born in Germany but the family moved to Richmond, Virginia where Daniel worked for the Whitehurst Studio. He opened his own studio first in Richmond and later Baltimore, Maryland where he employed his brother David. By the 1860s they were one of the largest photographic studios south of Philadelphia and the largest Jewish-owned studio in the country.

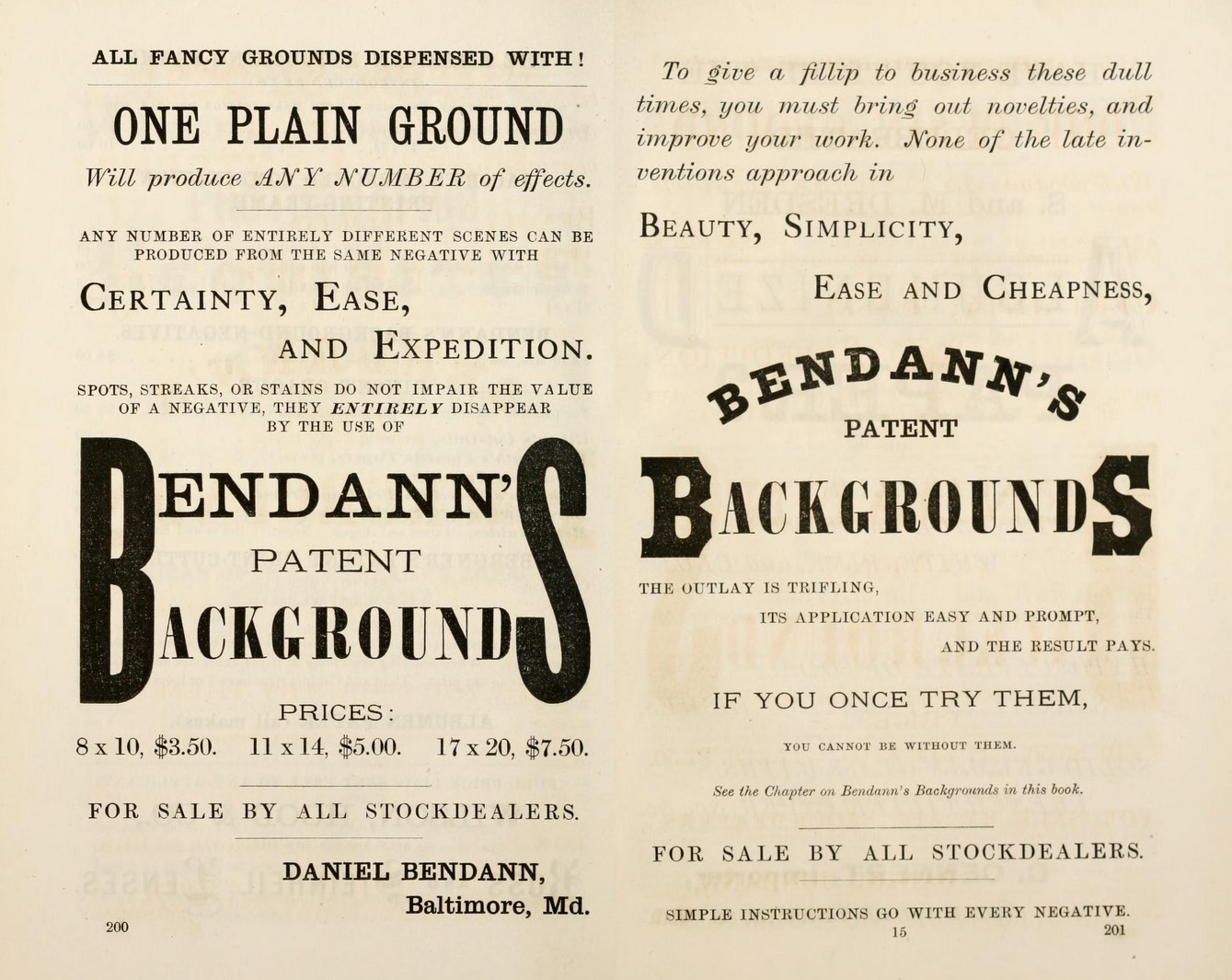
Bendanns Backgrounds Advertisement from Charles Hearn's book The Practical Printer

The Bendanns had a system which they patented, whereby photographic studios could purchase negatives for their “Bendann Brothers Backgrounds” that they could use in their own photos. The Bendann Brothers received a National Photographic Association Holmes Medal in 1872 for this invention.

Together they took portraits of many well-known people including Edgar Allan Poe, Jefferson Davis, Robert E. Lee, Presidents Buchanan and Hayes, and Johns Hopkins.

David Bendann left Bendann Brothers in 1874 to open Bendann Art Galleries. Daniel stayed with the studio, retiring around 1900.
