= Wilson's Photographic Magazine =

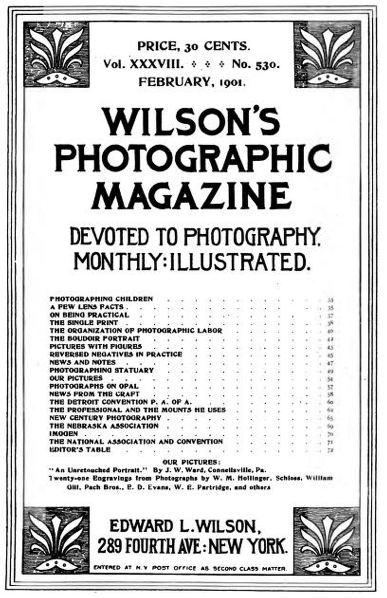
Wilson's Photographic Magazine, 1901

Wilson's Photographic Magazine (1889–1914) was an American periodical published in New York by Edward Livingston Wilson. It featured work by notable photographers such as Elmer Chickering and Imogen Cunningham and articles about the photography industry. Editors included Wilson, Mrs. Edward L. Wilson and T. Dixon Tennant.

Previously Wilson had produced a magazine called The Philadelphia Photographer which appeared from 1864 through December 1888. That magazine often featured tipped in frontispiece photographic prints created by Philadelphia photographer John Moran. Wilson's Photographic continued this work for a wider audience. In 1915 the magazine was renamed The Photographic Journal of America which ran until 1923.
