= National Photographic Association of the United States =

Logo

The National Photographic Association of the United States (1868–1880) formed "for the purpose of elevating and advancing the art of photography, and for the protection and furthering the interests of those who make their living by it." In particular, the group organized initially to prevent "the reissue of the ... ambrotype patent."

== History ==
Through the years, officers of the society included

- W. Irving Adams,
- J. Baker,
- Abraham Bogardus,
- James Wallace Black,
- R. J. Chute,
- Benjamin French,
- Alfred Hall,
- Alfred Howe,
- Albert Southworth,
- W. H. Rhoads,
- Samuel Root
- William Rulofson,
- J. F. Ryder,
- J. B. Webster, and Edward L. Wilson.

Conferences occurred annually, beginning in June 1869, with the "National Photographic Association Exposition and Convention" held in Boston. Its purpose was "to keep the public informed as to progress of photography, [to share] amongst photographers a knowledge of the improvements that are made both here and abroad, and to excite ... a taste for the new art. An exhibition will be formed to contain the pictures of contemporary artists. ...There will also be shown various photographic apparatus, chemicals. ... A course of lectures on the chemical properties of light will be delivered by a number of scientific gentlemen." Subsequent conventions took place in: Cleveland (June 7–10, 1870) ("it is thought 400 members will be present. The photographs on exhibition are the largest collection ever seen in this country, and are the finest specimens"); Philadelphia (June 1871); St. Louis (1872); Buffalo (1873); Chicago (July 1874); San Francisco (July 1875); and Philadelphia (1876).

At the 1871 convention in Philadelphia, events included "a grand stereopticon and lantern exhibition; ...business and scientific meetings." "The whole affair is to be a grand one, conducted on a magnificent scale. The railroad companies have made liberal arrangements for delegates, and at least one thousand photographers are expected." Among the numerous exhibitors in Horticultural Hall:

- A. M. Allen, Pottsville PA
- D. H. Anderson, Richmond VA
- E. & H. T. Anthony & Co., NY
- B. F. Battels, Akron, OH
- W. G. Basset, Erie PA
- Robert Benecke, St. Louis
- Bennermann & Wilson
- Herman Boettger, Philadelphia
- A. Bogardus, NY
- J. H. Bostwick, Bristol PA
- N. H. Bussey, Baltimore
- W. M. Chase, Baltimore
- Charles Cooper & Co., NY
- Cramer, Gross & Co., St. Louis
- James Cremer, Philadelphia
- Crosscup & West
- Dinsmore & Wilson, Baltimore
- B. L. H. Dobbs, Pittsburg
- L. Dubernol, NY
- E. J. Foss, Boston
- Gihon & Thompson, Philadelphia
- F. Gutekunst, Philadelphia
- William H. Harding
- E. E. Henry, Kansas
- Jones & Stiff, Salem MA
- Kilburn Brothers, Littleton NH
- R. Knecht, Paterson NY
- A. Kracan, Iowa
- Oscar Kunath, NY
- W. Kurtz, NY
- M. Carey Lea, Philadelphia
- Lenox Glass Co., Massachusetts
- D. Lothrop, Philadelphia
- Maddock & Co., NY
- J.F. Meyer
- Miltz & Swart, Peoria, Ill.
- J. Morrey
- Albert Moore, Philadelphia
- J. W. Morgeneier, Sheboygan, Michigan
- William Nottmann, Montreal
- Oster, Philadelphia
- Lewis Pattberg & Bro., NY
- W. S. Pendleton, Brooklyn
- L. D. Philippi, Philadelphia
- Photograph Relief Printing Co., Philadelphia
- Powers & Weightman
- J. Reid, Paterson NJ
- William H. Rhoads, Philadelphia
- J. F. Ryder, Cleveland OH
- S. W. Sawyer, Chicago
- Schneider & Son, Philadelphia
- Andrew Scholler, St. Louis
- Scoville Manufacturing Co.
- F. L. Stuber, Bethlehem PA
- H. K. P. Trask
- Henry Peach Robinson and Nelson King Cherrill, Tunbridge, England
- William Valk, Philadelphia
- Leon Van Loo, Cincinnati
- Vansyckel & Burr, Philadelphia
- Dr. H. Vogel, Berlin
- C. E. Wallin, Indiana
- Walmsley & Co., Philadelphia
- F. A. Wenderoth, Philadelphia
- Wilson, Hood & Co., Philadelphia
- C. A. Zimmerman, St. Paul MN

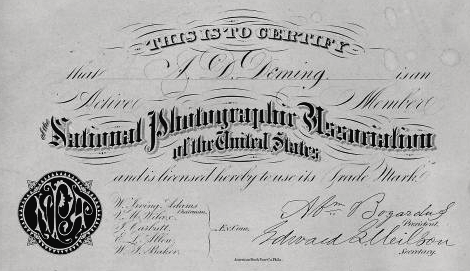
Membership certificate, c.1874

Growing membership and conference attendance proved the success of the organization. By 1873, "we can see the leaven working which was scattered at the birth of the National Photographic Association, and the result is most promising. The whole body photographic is feeling its influence in one way or another, and the thirst for more knowledge is very apparent in the increased attendance upon and interest in the annual conventions and exhibitions."

However, according to one account, by the late 1870s "photographers were ... assailed on every side by process-vendors and patentees, and 'lightning' processes were pushed against them with great vigor, and many victims were caught. The Executive Committee of the N.P.A. became discouraged, and, largely in debt, the society died."

In 1880 the group merged with the Photographers Association of America (later called the Professional Photographers of America).
