= Walter O. Snelling =

American chemist (1880–1965)

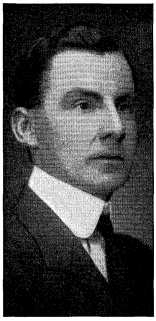
- Snelling in 1915
- Born: Walter Otheman Snelling; December 13, 1880; Washington, D.C., U.S.
- Died: September 10, 1965 (aged 84); Allentown, Pennsylvania, U.S.
- Education: George Washington University (B.S.), Harvard University (B.S.), Yale University, George Washington University (PhD)
- Known for: Discovery of propane
- Awards: Edward Longstreth Medal (1962); Honorary Doctor of Science, Lehigh University
- Scientific career
- Fields: Chemist
- Workplaces: U.S. Bureau of Mines; American Gasol

Walter Otheman Snelling (December 13, 1880 – September 10, 1965) was a chemist who contributed to the development of explosives, aircraft ordnance, and liquefied petroleum gas.

== Early life and education ==
Snelling was born in Washington, D.C., on December 13, 1880, the elder of two sons of Walter Comonfort Snelling (1859–1893) and Alice Lee Hornor (1861–1919). Walter Comonfort Snelling was an inventor who patented an adding machine. Alice Lee Hornor, from a Quaker family, became a suffragette who studied law and medicine and traveled and wrote extensively. On June 27, 1894, she remarried, to John Oliver Moque. He had a full brother, Henry Hornor Snelling, and a half-sister, Voleta Alice Moque.

Snelling attended George Washington University, where he received a B.S. in 1904, and then attended Harvard University, where he received a second B.S. in 1905. He then attended Yale University, and received a Ph.D. from George Washington University in 1907.

== Career ==
From 1907 to 1910, he worked for the United States Geological Survey, initially in Washington, D.C., and later in Pittsburgh. He invented an underwater detonator that was credited with saving the U.S. government $500,000 a year during the construction of the Panama Canal.

In 1910, Snelling became chemist-in-charge of the explosives laboratory at the United States Bureau of Mines. A major focus of his job was mine safety, but he also researched the production of propane, which had been discovered dissolved in light crude oil in Pennsylvania by Edmund Ronalds in 1864. Snelling highlighted propane as a volatile component in gasoline in 1910, built a distilling apparatus, and separated it into liquid and gaseous components. The volatility of these lighter hydrocarbons caused them to be known as "wild" because of the high vapor pressures of unrefined gasoline.

On March 31, 1910, The New York Times reported on Snelling's work with liquefied gas, reporting that, "...a steel bottle will carry enough gas to light an ordinary home for three weeks."

Snelling's work with "wild gas" became the basis for a patent critical to Snelling's next venture, development of a commercial method to produce liquefied petroleum gas, mostly propane. By the end of 1911, Snelling had established contact with Frank P. Peterson, Chester Kerr, and Arthur Kerr, who were actively researching natural gas. On November 11, 1911, American Gasol Co. was incorporated in West Virginia. C. L. Kerr, Frank Peterson and Snelling each held 261 shares of the initial 2,000 shares of the company's stock. Kerr was named president, and Peterson and Snelling were among the directors of the new company. On March 25, 1913, Snelling's method of processing and producing liquified petroleum gases was issued patent #1,056,845. A separate method of producing LP gas through compression was created by Frank Peterson and its patent granted on July 2, 1912.

The first customer for liquified petroleum gas was John Gahring, who had it installed for lighting and cooking in his home as of May 17, 1912. By June 1912, Snelling felt that the business was stable enough to enable him to resign from the Bureau of Mines. However, expansion was slow, and in September 1912, M. L. Benedum and J. C. Trees of Pittsburgh financed the company, paying $10,000 for 200 shares of stock each. On August 25, 1913, E. W. De Bower offered Snelling, Peterson, and Kerr a certified check for $50,000 for American Gasol, and gave them 30 minutes to decide whether or not to sell. Peterson and Kerr voted to accept the offer, and Snelling reluctantly agreed.

Analysis of sample of propane that can be traced back to Snelling has been shown to contain 0.062 mole% methane, 23.44 mole% ethane, 57.366 mole% propane, 7.127 mole% isobutane, 11.957 mole% butane, and 0.044 mole% isopentane. In 1913, Snelling sold his propane patent for $50,000 to Frank Phillips, the founder of Phillips Petroleum Company.

Snelling worked as a consultant and private researcher until 1917 when he was offered full-time employment at the Trojan Powder Company. He eventually became the company's director of research. Snelling remained with Trojan from 1917 until his retirement in 1954, and continued to consult for them until 1957.

During World War II, Snelling worked on military ordnance, including service at Plum Brook Ordnance Works in Sandusky, Ohio and the Supreme Headquarters Allied Expeditionary Force in Germany. While at Plum Brook, he studied the effects of sunlight on TNT, and discovered that TNT could be used instead of silver salts to coat photographic paper.

In 1946, he became a consultant to the newly formed Atomic Energy Commission, serving as a member of the Raw Materials Advisory Committee until 1960 when it was dissolved. By 1960, he held 179 patents, most in the areas of propane, oil-cracking, explosives, and ordnance.

In 1962, the Franklin Institute in Philadelphia recognized Snelling, awarding him its Edward Longstreth Medal. He was awarded an honorary doctor of science from Lehigh University.

== Personal life ==
In 1919, Snelling married Helen Marjorie Gahring (1901–1976) in Union City, Pennsylvania. She was the daughter of his first customer, John Gahring. The Snellings had seven children and lived their entire married lives in Allentown, Pennsylvania. The family purchased a home at the edge of the city's West Park in either 1940 or 1941, and Walter remained there until his death on September 10, 1965.

One of their sons, Richard Arkwright Snelling, was the Governor of Vermont. Another son, Charles Darwin Snelling, was appointed chairman of the Metropolitan Washington Airports Authority, a life trustee of Cedar Crest College in Allentown, a member of the Propane Education and Research Council, and past president of the Pennsylvania Society. He published a short memoir in New York Times columnist David Brooks' blog.

== In popular culture ==
On an episode of the animated television series King of the Hill, character Hank Hill refers to Snelling as the "father of modern propane."
