= Amory Nelson Hardy =

American photographer

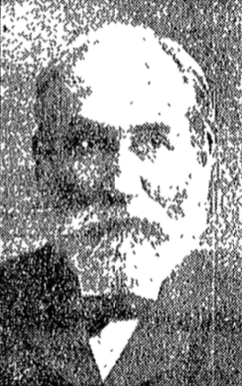
Portrait of A.N. Hardy

Amory Nelson Hardy or A.N. Hardy (July 17, 1834, or 1835 – February 24, 1911) was American photographer active in Boston, Massachusetts in the 19th century. Portrait subjects included US president Chester A. Arthur, clergyman Henry Ward Beecher, politician James G. Blaine, abolitionist William Lloyd Garrison, doctor Oliver Wendell Holmes Sr., jurist Oliver Wendell Holmes Jr., writer Julia Ward Howe, labor activist Florence Kelley, suffragist Mary Livermore, philanthropist Isabella Somerset, and suffragist Frances Willard. He also made "electric-light portraits" of roller skaters in 1883.

== Biography ==
Hardy was born in Carmel, Maine, son of schoolteacher Benjamin Hardy. He married Angeline S. Davis in 1857 and had three children: Bertha, Grace, and William. As a young man he started a photography business in Lewiston, Maine, before moving to Boston where he kept a studio on Winter Street (c. 1873–1878), Washington Street (c. 1868 and c. 1879–1887), Temple Place, and Tremont Street. He belonged to the National Photographic Association of the United States, the Massachusetts Charitable Mechanic Association, and, outside of his professional life, the Tremont Temple congregation. In 1880 he exhibited photos at the first convention of the Photographers Association of America in Chicago. Hardy worked in Boston during a time when a number of other professional photographers kept studios in the downtown area, including Allen & Rowell, James Wallace Black, Elmer Chickering, William H. Getchell, J.J. Hawes, E.F. Ritz, Antoine Sonrel, and John Adams Whipple.

== Collections ==
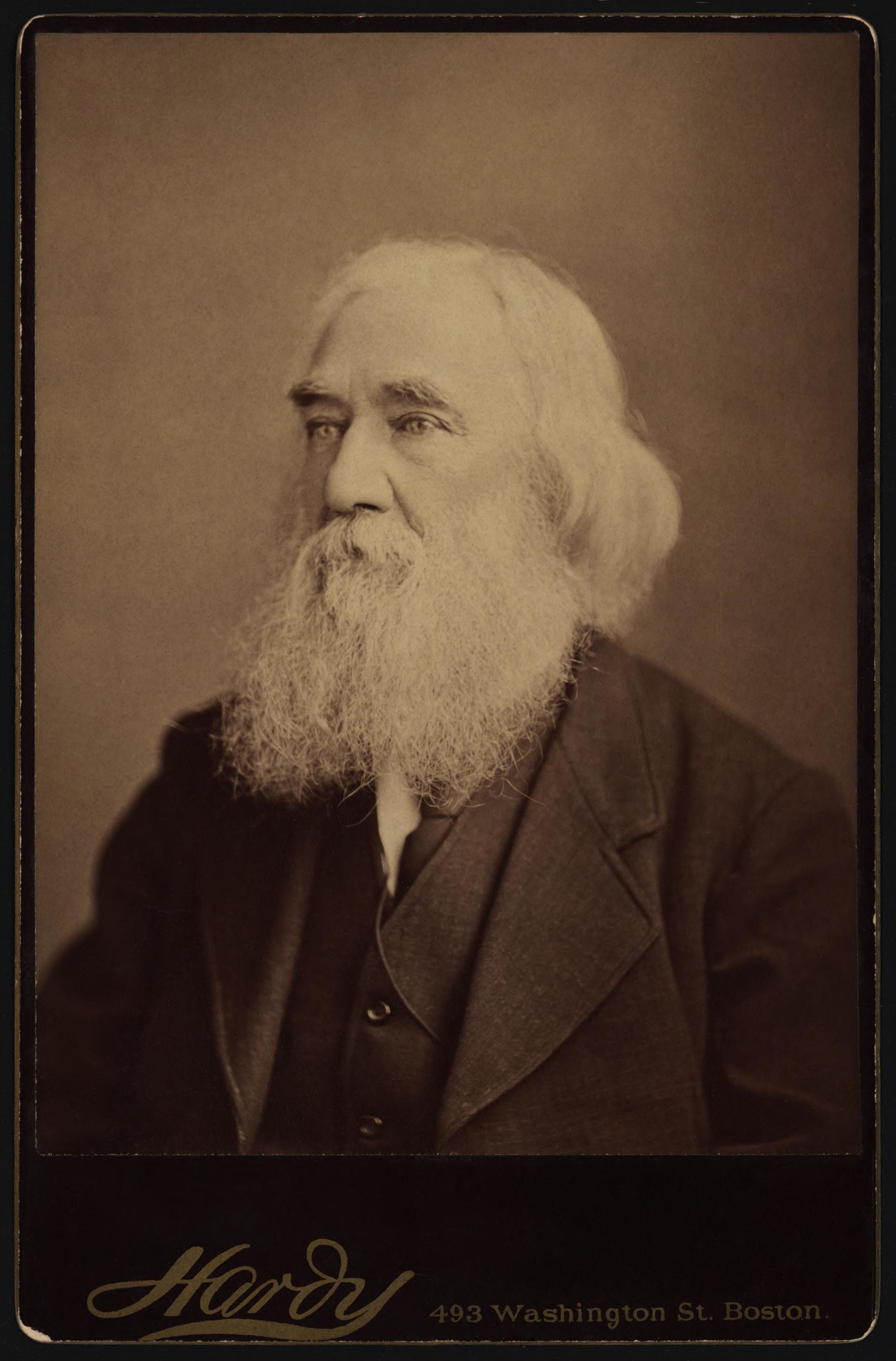
Cabinet card of Lysander Spooner held by the University of Michigan

Examples of Hardy's work are in the collections of the following institutions:

- Boston Athenaeum
- Boston Public Library
- Dennis Historical Society, Dennis, Massachusetts
- Harvard University
- Hingham Historical Society, Hingham, Massachusetts
- Historic New England
- International Center of Photography
- Massachusetts Historical Society
- New York Public Library
- US Library of Congress
- US National Portrait Gallery

== Bibliography ==
- "Inside View of a Boston Photographic Studio". Photographic Times and American Photographer. 12 (135). New York. 1882. (About Hardy)
- "A.N. Hardy". Leading Manufacturers and Merchants of the City of Boston. 1885. p. 286.
- "Amory N. Hardy Dead; Prominent as a Photographer for 40 Years in Boston and Won Many Medals for His Work", Boston Daily Globe, February 26, 1911

== Images ==
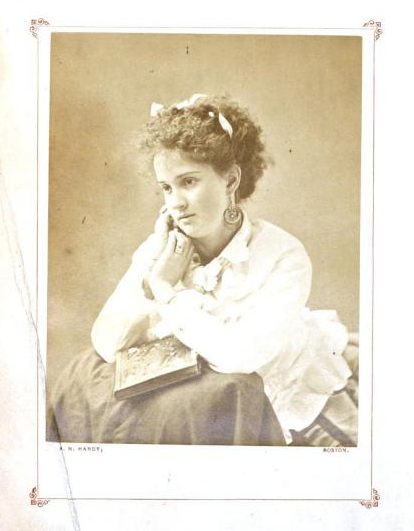
Portrait by A.N. Hardy, 1872

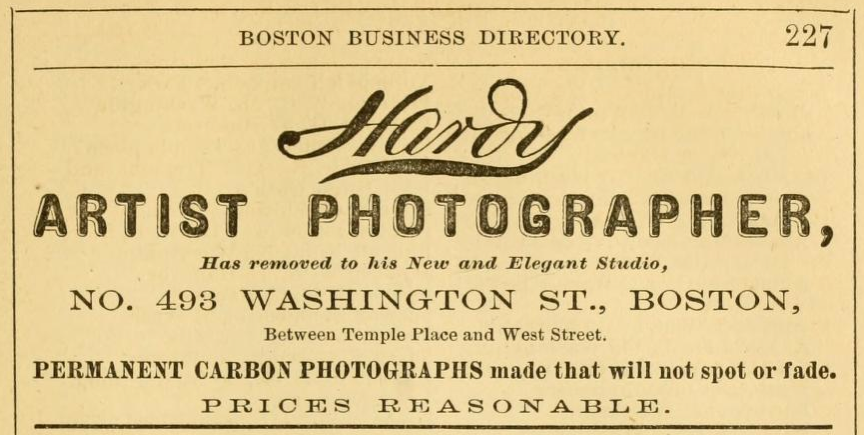
Advertisement for Hardy, 1879

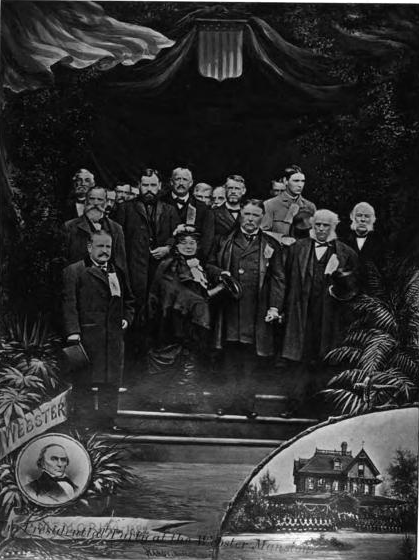
U.S. President Chester A. Arthur at Daniel Webster house, Marshfield, Massachusetts, 1882, by A.N. Hardy

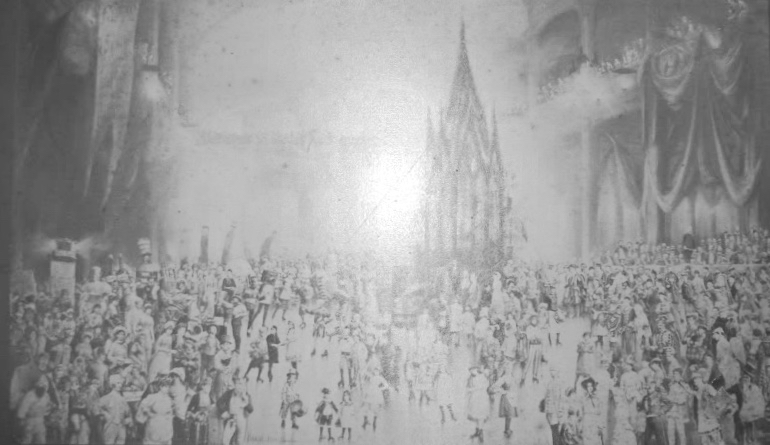
Rollerskating event at Mechanics Hall, Boston, 1883, by Hardy

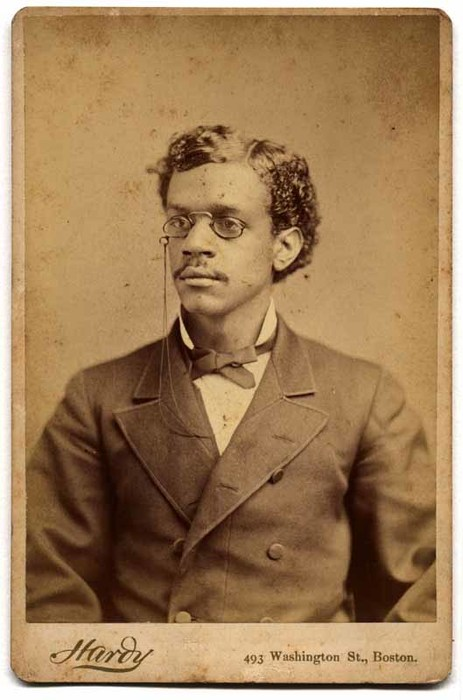
Portrait by Hardy, 19th century

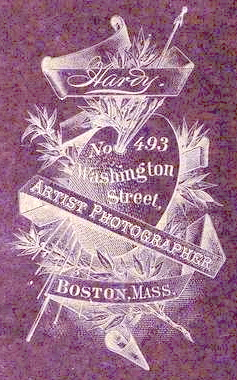
Logo of Hardy, 19th century
