= John Bellew =

John Bellew may refer to:

- John Chippendall Montesquieu Bellew (1823–1874), English author, preacher, and public reader
- John Bellew, 1st Baron Bellew of Duleek (died 1692), Irish Jacobite soldier and politician
