= Elmer Chickering =

American photographer

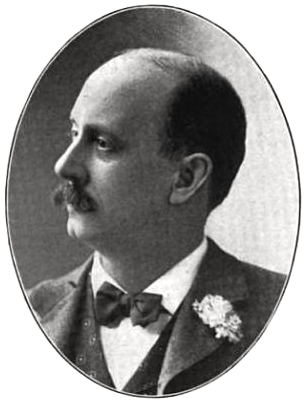
Portrait of Elmer Chickering, c. 1903

Elmer Chickering (1857–1915) was a photographer specializing in portraits in Boston, Massachusetts, in the late 19th and early 20th centuries. He kept a studio on West Street, and photographed politicians, actors, athletes and other public figures such as Kyrle Bellew, John Philip Sousa, Sarah Winnemucca, Edmund Breese, and the Boston Americans.

== Biography ==
Born in Vermont in 1857, Chickering moved to Boston and set up a photography studio around the 1880s. His photographic work appeared in numerous publications, including Good Housekeeping. In 1905 Chickering renamed his business as "Elmer Chickering Co."

In 1895 Chickering "took some pictures of A. M. Palmer's company in the play of Trilby. They naturally came into great demand at once. But here the difficulty ensued. Rushing over the wires came a message from Harper & Bros., saying that, as the characters were made up after Du Maurier's drawings, they should regard the sale of any such pictures as an infringement of their copyright. To this Mr. Chickering disagreed, on the ground that the photographs were not copies of any drawings, but of actual scenes on the stage, which any man might sketch. Telegrams flew back and forth, but Harper & Bros, would not yield. Meanwhile, the papers sought for the photographs. ... Inasmuch as he has 160 negatives, the question is of some moment."

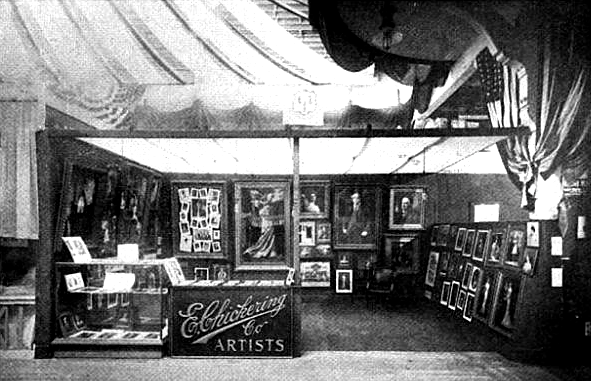
Booth of E. Chickering Co., New England Industrial and Educational exposition, Mechanics Hall, Boston, 1911

After Chickering's death in 1915, "the well-known Chickering Studios, West Street, Boston ... is now owned and operated by George H. Hastings and Orrin Champlain. ... Mr. Hastings, personally, manages the Chickering Studio, which is now enjoying a large and profitable patronage."

Examples of Chickering's work are in the New York Public Library.

== Images ==
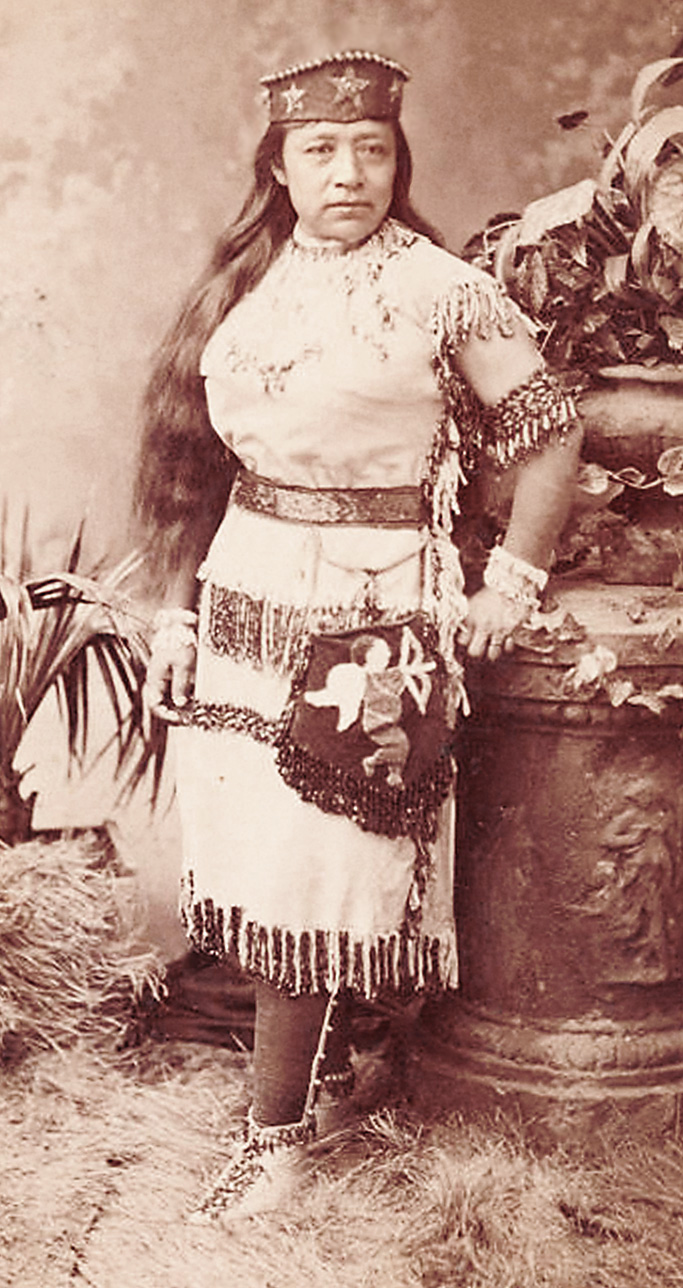
Portrait of Sarah Winnemucca, c. 1884

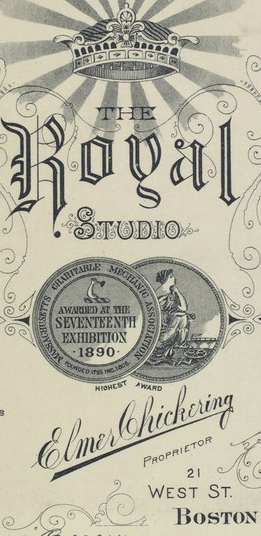
Chickering's "Royal Studio", West St., Boston, ca.1893

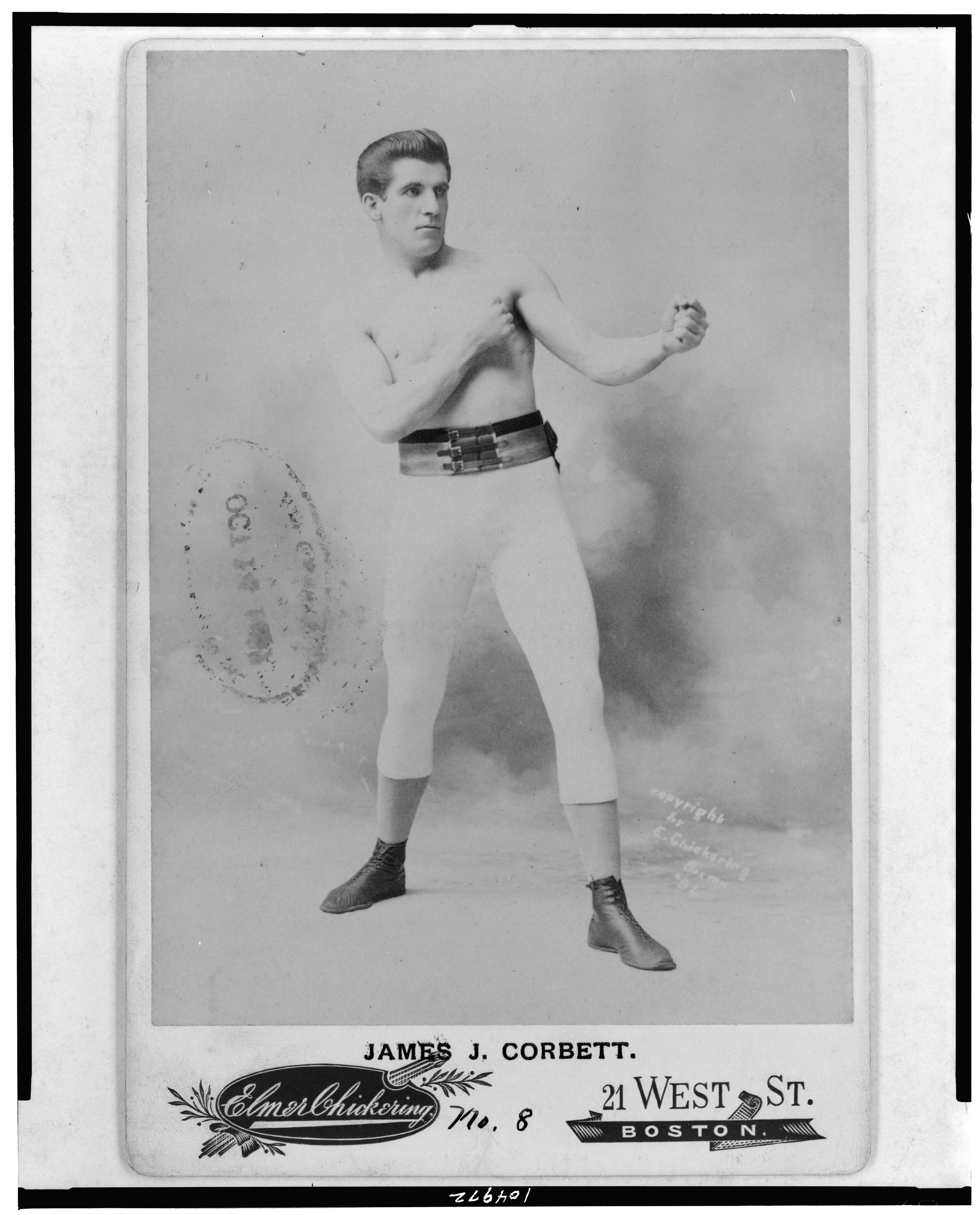
Portrait of James J. Corbett, 1897

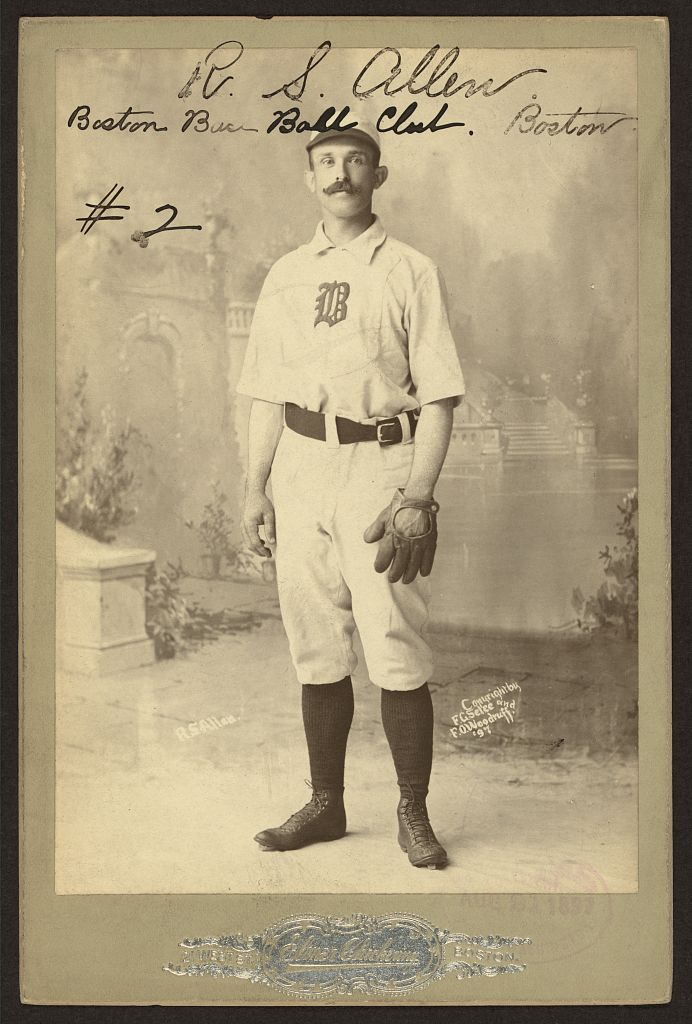
Portrait of Robert Allen of the Boston Beaneaters, 1897

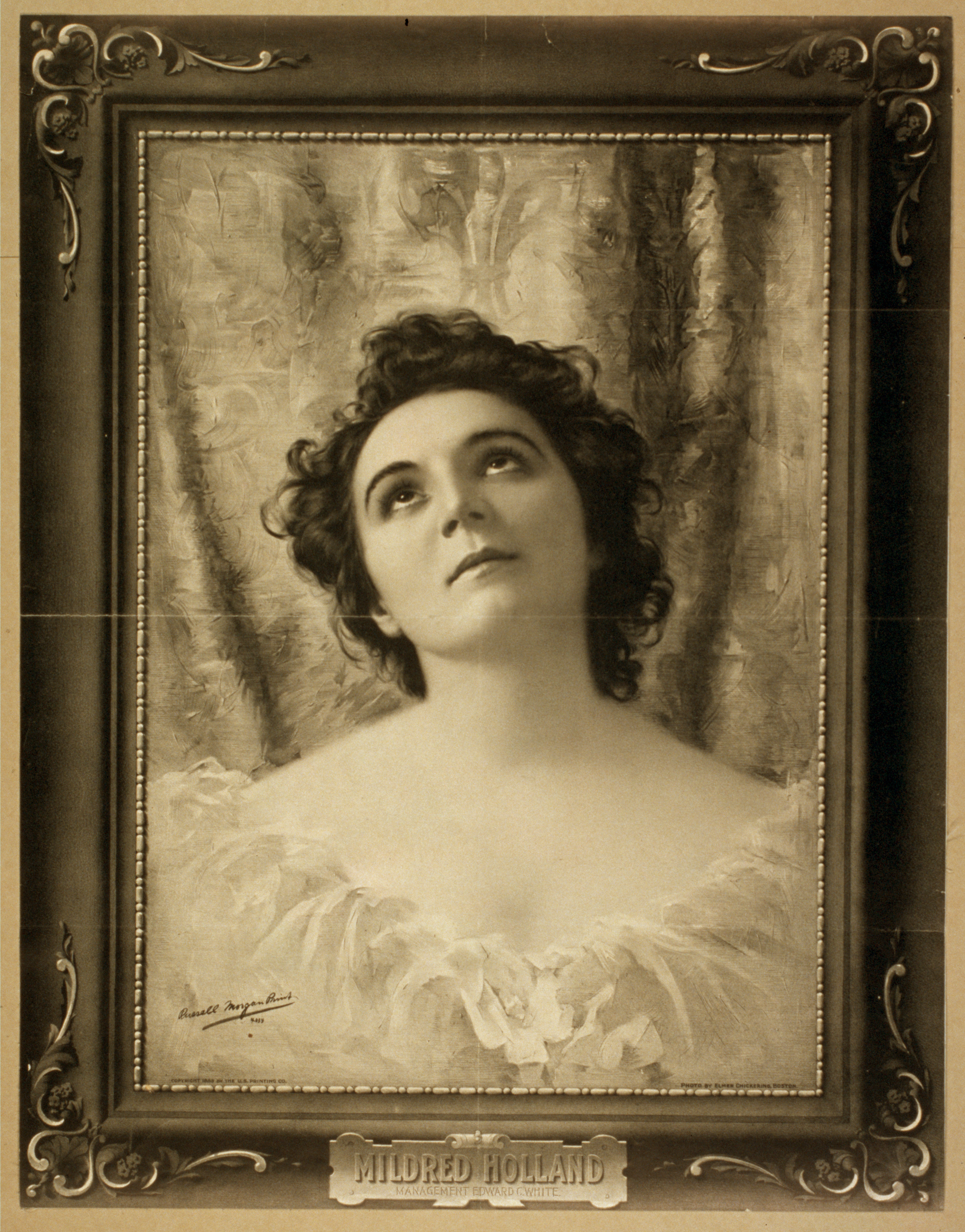
Poster of Mildred Holland, from photo by Chickering, 1899

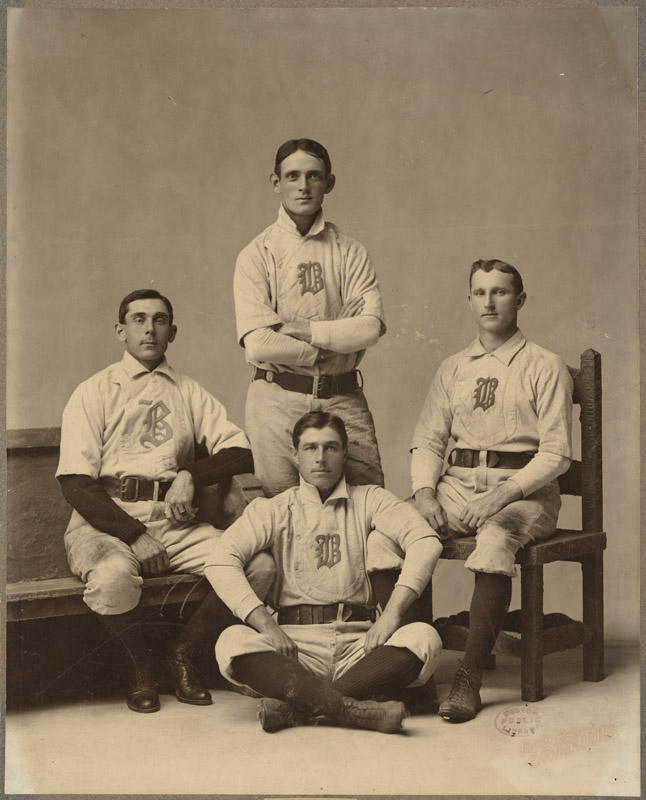
Portrait of "famous Boston infield of 1900" (clockwise from left) second baseman Bobby Lowe, first baseman Fred Tenney, shortstop Herman Long and third baseman Jimmy Collins

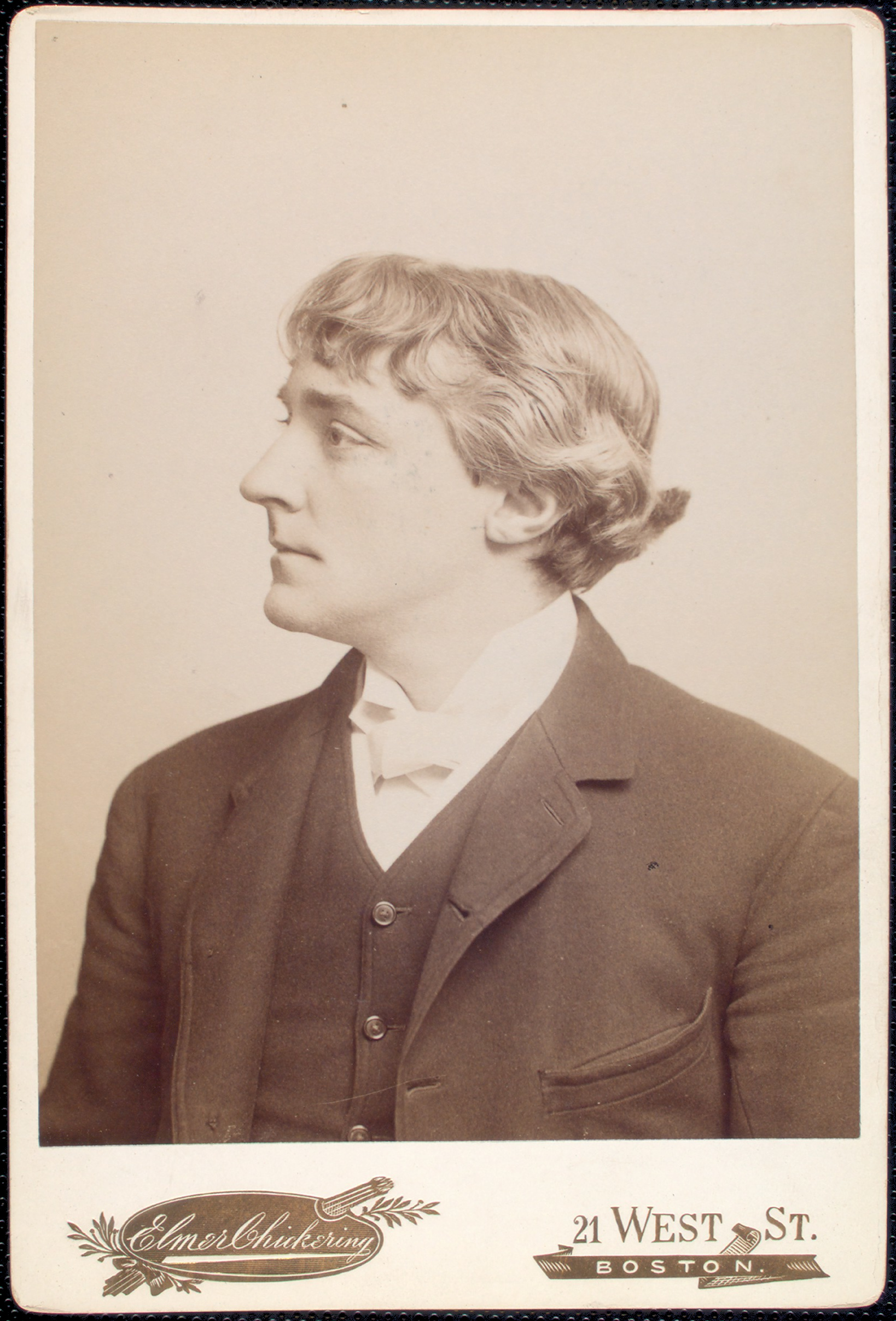
Portrait of Kyrle Bellew

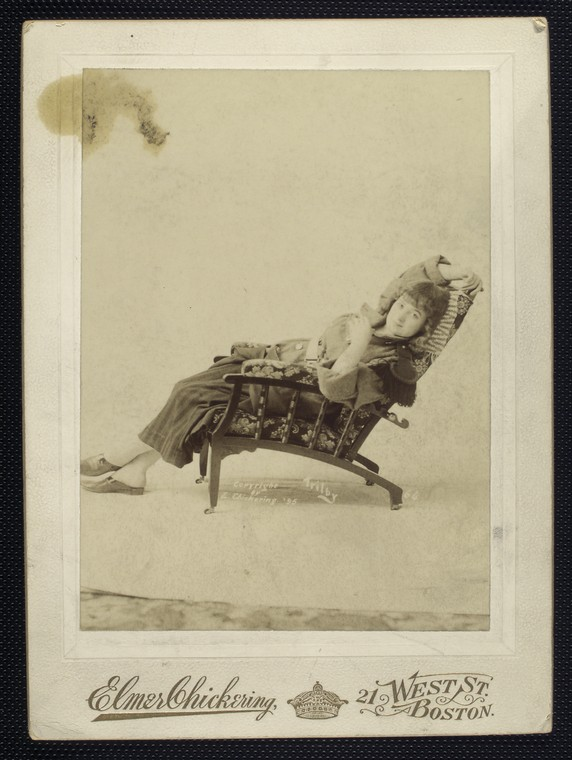
Portrait of Mabel Amber

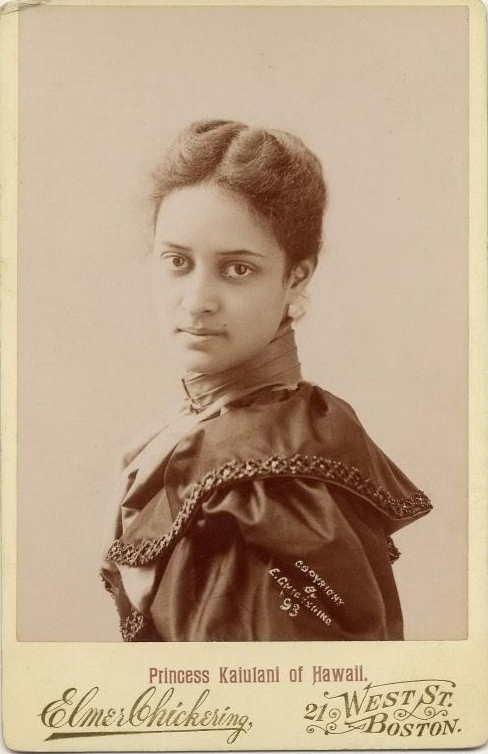
Portrait of Princess Kiulani of Hawaii
