= John Chippendall Montesquieu Bellew =

English clergyman and author

J. C. M. Bellew
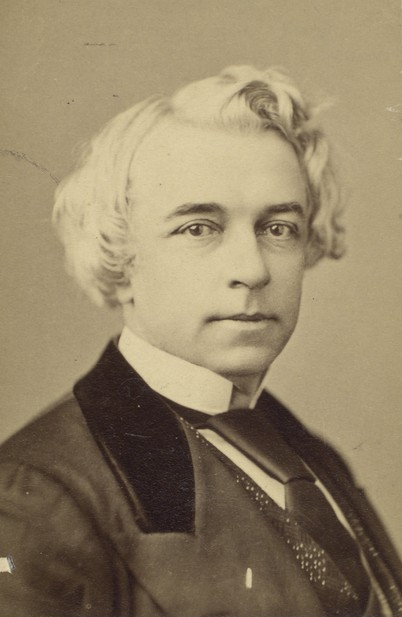
- Born: John Higgin; 3 August 1823; Lancaster, Lancashire, England
- Died: 19 June 1874 (aged 50); St John's Wood, London, England
- Resting place: Kensal Green Cemetery, London, W10, England
- Occupation: Cleric
- Years active: 1848–1870
- Spouse: Eva Maria Money (m. 1847; div. 1861) Emily Louisa Wilkinson (née East) (m. 1861)
- Children: 4

John Chippendall Montesquieu Bellew (né Higgin; 3 August 1823 – 19 June 1874) was an English author, preacher, and public reader.

== Early life ==
He was born at Lancaster on 3 August 1823, the only child of an infantry officer, Captain Robert Higgin, of the 12th Regiment, son of John Higgin of Lancaster. His mother, Anne Maria Bellew, who was a Roman Catholic, who towards the close of 1822 had married Captain Higgin; she was the daughter of John Bellew, of Castle Bellew, County Galway, and cousin of Lord Bellew. She was co-heiress under the will of her uncle, Major-general Bellew, heir-at-law of the O'Briens, earls of Thomond.

Educated during his earlier years at Lancaster Grammar School, Higgin in 1843 matriculated at St Mary Hall, Oxford. On attaining his majority in the autumn of 1844 he took his mother's maiden name Bellew, and dropped his patronymic Higgin. He was induced to do this by the circumstance of his being descended maternally from the senior branch of the O'Briens, and thus a descendant from Teige the second brother of Donough, the fourth earl, brother of Daniel O'Brien, 1st Viscount Clare. Soon after entering the university, he became known as a speaker at the Oxford Union.

== Cleric ==
Bellew was ordained in 1848, was appointed a curate of St. Andrews in Worcester, and in 1850 transferred to a curacy at Prescot, Lancashire. In the following year he went to the East Indies. There, almost immediately upon his arrival in 1851 at Calcutta, he was nominated chaplain of St. John's Cathedral there. He held that position for four years, during part of which he also wrote for the Morning Post and edited the Bengal Hurkaru.

Returning to England in 1855, he was appointed assistant minister of St. Philip's, Regent Street. In 1857 he assumed the sole charge of St. Mark's Hamilton Terrace, Marylebone. That office he held for five years; in 1862 he became incumbent of Bedford Chapel, Bloomsbury. Between 1855 and 1867 he became known as one of the most popular London preachers. It was said that no preacher of his time had greater oratorical gifts by nature, and that no man had taken greater pains than he to improve and cultivate them. He published sermons, a novel (Blount's Tempest), and some work on poetry. In 1868, he converted to Roman Catholicism, his mother's faith and gave up Anglican holy orders on 13 August 1870. In so doing he gave up an income of around £1,000 a year.

Bellew continued to write, but became particularly known for his public readings, which were thought comparable to those of Charles Dickens and Fanny Kemble. However, making two American expeditions in rapid succession exhausted him, and he died aged 50 on 19 June 1874, at 16 Circus Road, St John's Wood, London. He was buried at Kensal Green Cemetery.

== Works ==
- Loyalty: a legend of Speke Hall, Lancashire: a play: as licensed by the Lord Chamberlain, and originally performed, London, Whittaker and Co.; Oxford, J. Vincent, 1845.
- Sermons preached in St. Philip's, Regent Street : together with two discourses delivered on the days of national thanksgiving, 1855, 1856, London: T. and W. Boone, 1856.
- The perishable and the imperishable : a sermon preached in the parish church of the Holy Trinity, Hull, on Sunday, the 20th of February 1859, London: Chapman and Hall, 1859.
- Oliver Goldsmith: his life and writings, London: Chapman and Hall, 1859.
- Christ in Life, Life in Christ, London: Chapman and Hall, 1860. 397pp.
- Over the Lebanon to Baalbek, London: Ward and Lock, 1861.
- Our heavenly home : a sermon delivered at St. Mark's, St. John's Wood, on Christmas Day, 1861, London: J. Knight, 1861.
- Shakespeare's Home at New Place, Stratford-upon-Avon, being a history of the Great House built in the reign of King Henry VII by Sir Hugh Clopton, Knight, and subsequently the property of William Shakespeare, Gent., wherein he lived and died, London: Virtue Bros. and Co., 1863. 8vo, 380pp.
- Pergamos, London: Virtue, 1863.
- Laodicea, London: Virtue, 1863.
- Philadelphia, London: Virtue, 1863.
- Smyrna, London: Virtue, 1863.
- Sardis, London: Virtue, 1863.
- A Descriptive Account of Thyatira, London: Virtue, 1863.
- The Church of Ephesus, London: Virtue, 1864.
- Blount Tempest, London: Hurst & Blackett, 1865. 3 vols.
- Holland House, London & New York: George Rutledge & Sons, 1867.
- Poet's Corner, a Manual for Students in English Poetry, with biographical Sketches of the Authors, 1868. 6vo, 920pp.
- 'Introduction', in The complete works of Bret Harte, in prose and poetry : now first collected, London: J. C. Hotten, 1872.
- J.M. Bellew's readings from American authors, Edinburgh, The Edinburgh publishing company, 1879.

== Family ==
Bellew met a young widow, Eva Maria Money, and they married on 27 March 1847. Together, they had four children: Evelyn Montesquieu Gambier (born 25 October 1847), Eva Sibyl (born October 1848), Harold Kyrle Money (better known as the stage actor Kyrle Bellew; born 28 March 1850), and Ida Percy Clare (born 17 June 1852).

Bellew received a mensa et thoro from his wife in 1855 on the grounds of adultery and took custody of their children, eventually divorcing her in 1861 and marrying Emily Louisa Wilkinson (née East) in that same year.
