= Ernest Ferdinand Ritz =

Swedish-American photographer

Ernest Ferdinand Ritz (5 March 1848 – 4 June 1890) was a Swedish-American photographer in Boston, Massachusetts during the 19th century.

Ritz was born in Stockholm. He came to the United States in November 1859, settling with his parents, Johanna and Oscar, in Boston. He became a citizen in 1876.

He learned photography working for Abraham Bogardus in New York City. From 1865 until 1884, he worked in partnership with George F. Hastings (1852–1931) at the Ritz & Hastings photography studio, located on Temple Place in Boston. The studio devoted itself exclusively to portrait work. In 1881 Ritz & Hastings showed work at the Massachusetts Charitable Mechanic Association exhibit and in 1883 at the Professional Photographers of America conference in Milwaukee.

He died in Boston, aged 42.

== Image gallery ==
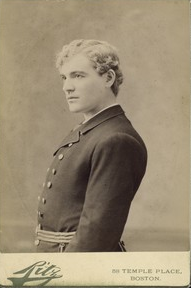
Portrait of Kyrle Bellew by Ritz (New York Public Library)

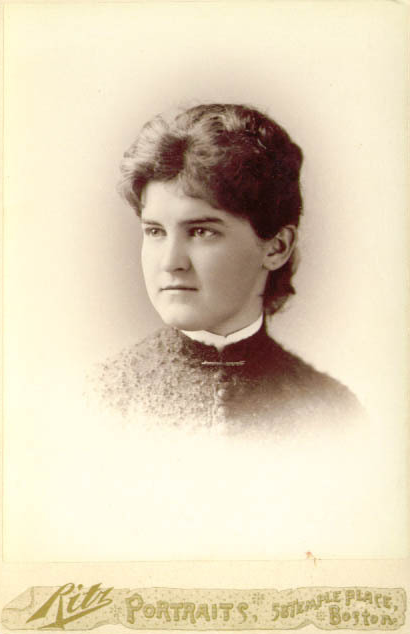
Portrait of unidentified woman by Ritz

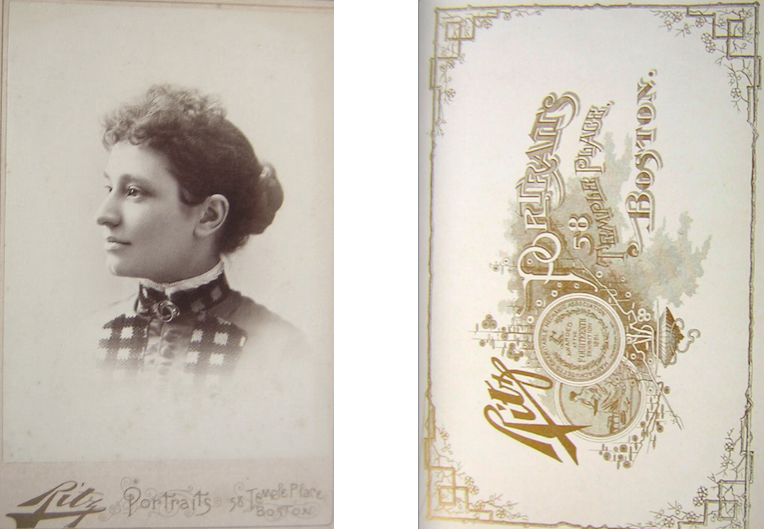
Portrait of unidentified woman by Ritz

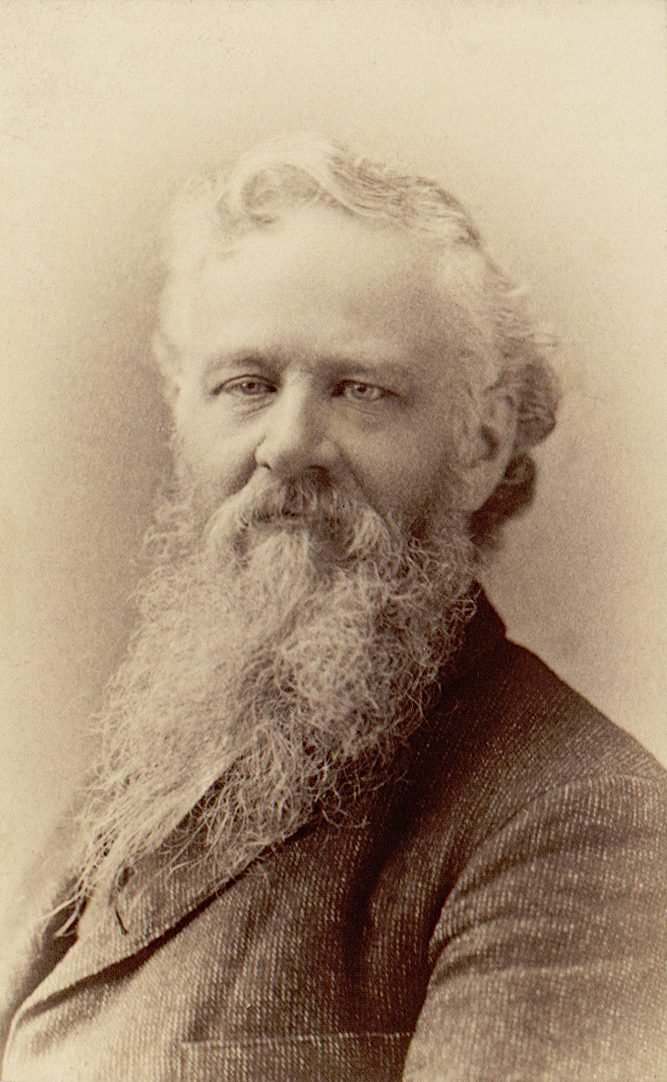
Portrait of William Douglas O'Connor by Ritz & Hastings (Library of Congress)

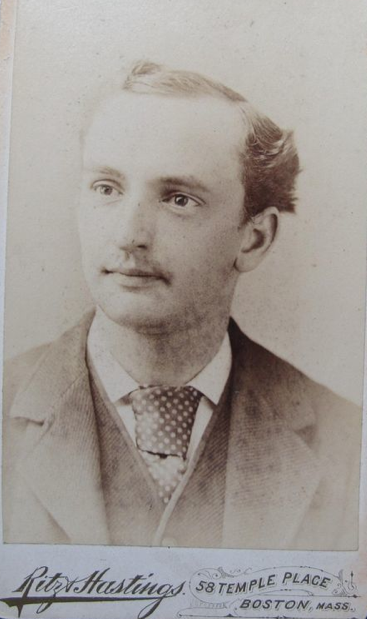
Portrait of unidentified man by Ritz & Hastings
