= William H. Getchell =

American photographer

William Henry Getchell (1829–1910) was a photographer in 19th-century Boston, Massachusetts. He was born in Hallowell, Maine, on March 10, 1829. He lived in Peoria, Illinois, and then moved to Boston. In 1857 he married Sarah Hartwell; they had one child—Frederick Getchell (b. 1858). In the early 1860s Getchell worked in Boston with George M. Silsbee and John G. Case as Silsbee, Case & Co.; and again with Case as Case & Getchell, ca.1862-1864. He later ran a solo photography studio in the 1860s and 1870s. As of 1898 he lived in Dorchester. He died in Boston in August, 1910.

== Images ==
Case & Getchell

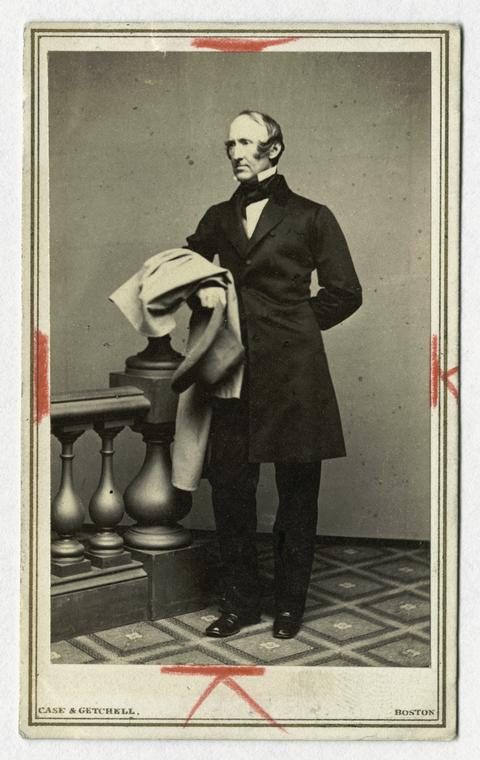
Portrait of Wendell Phillips, by Case & Getchell, ca.1863-1864

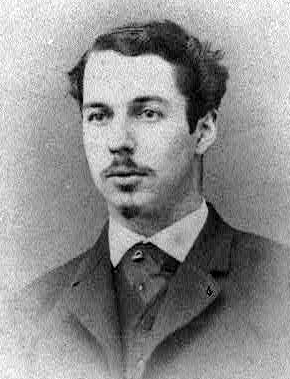
Portrait of Samuel Franklin Emmons, by Case & Getchell, ca.1860-1870

W.H. Getchell

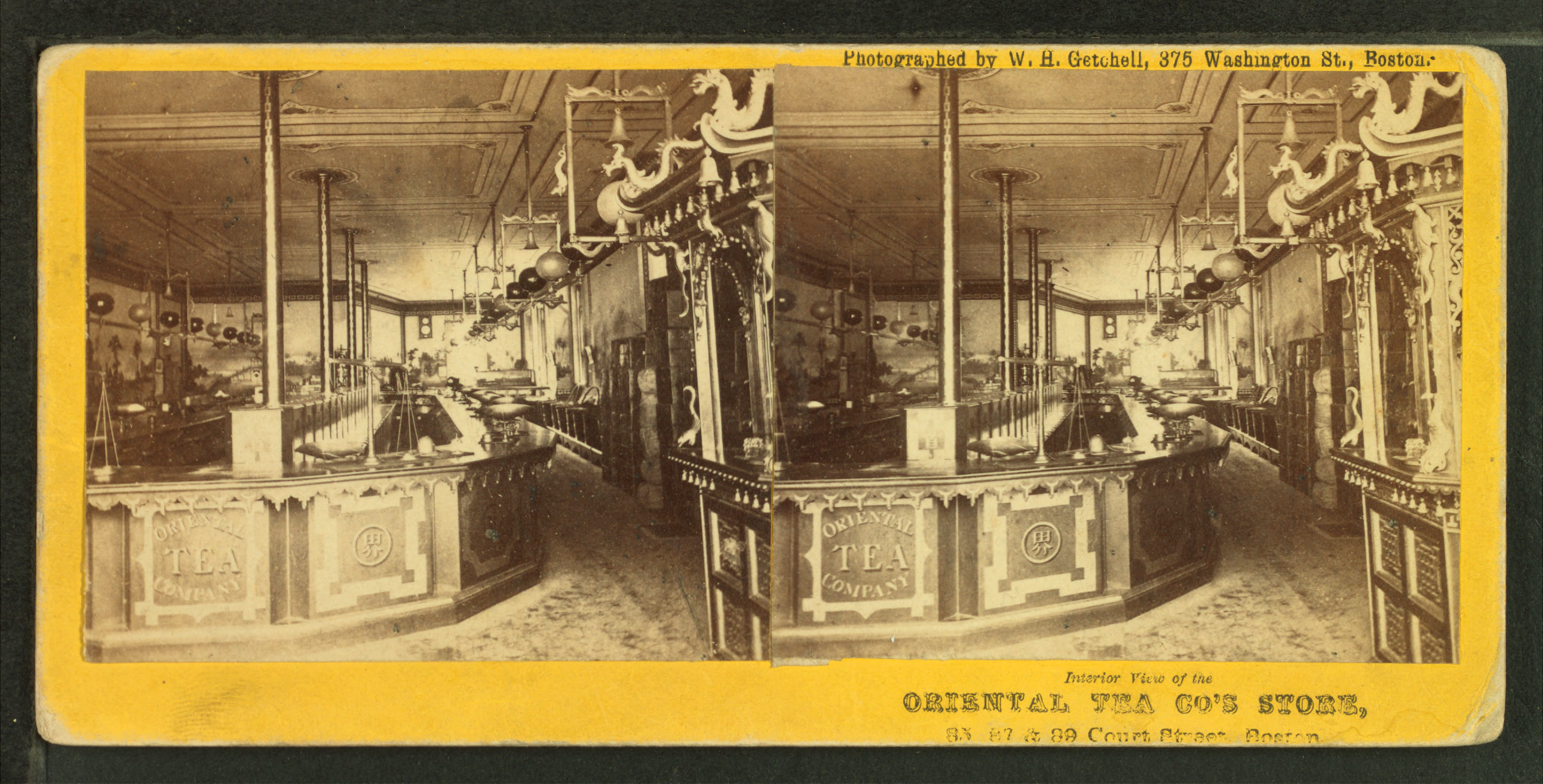
Oriental Tea Co., Court St., Boston

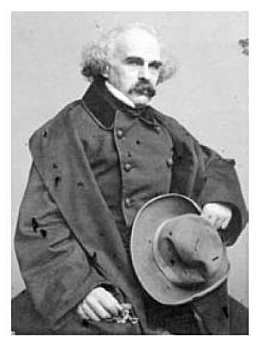
Nathaniel Hawthorne, 1861

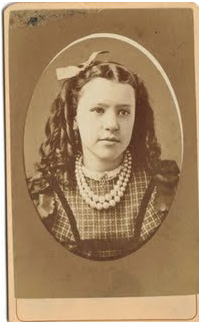
Unidentified young woman, ca.1870s
