= Edward L. Allen =

American photographer

Edward Lowe Allen (February 20, 1830 – January 6, 1914) was a 19th-century Canadian-American photographer. He was born in Halifax, Nova Scotia part of Newfoundland, and emigrated in 1845. In 1861, he became the first professional photographer in Boston, Massachusetts. He kept a studio on Temple Place in Boston (c. 1868–1871). For some years, he worked in partnership with Frank Rowell (as "Allen & Rowell"). Examples of Allen's photographs reside in the Boston Public Library and the Boston Athenaeum.

== Image gallery ==
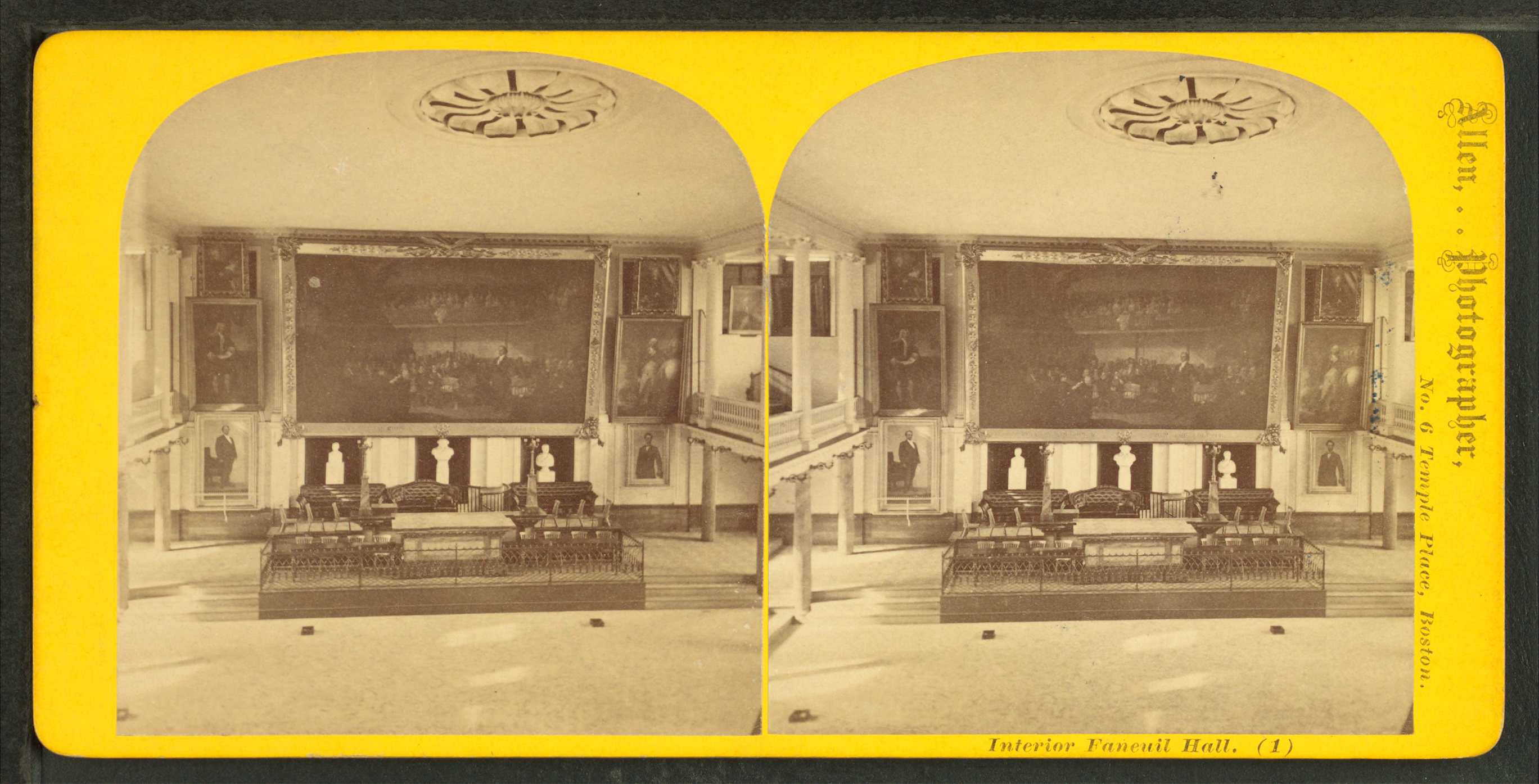
Faneuil Hall, Boston, 19th century

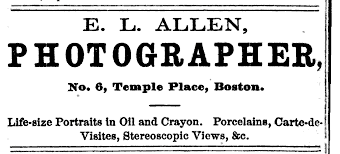
Advertisement, 1871

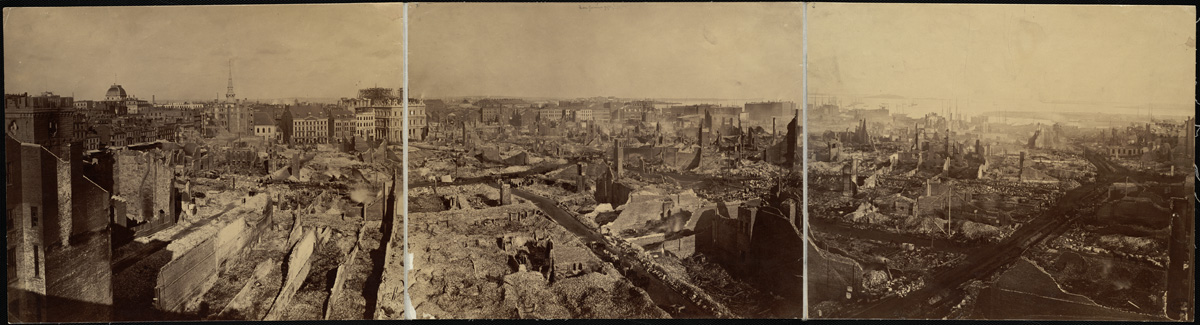
After the fire, Boston, 1872

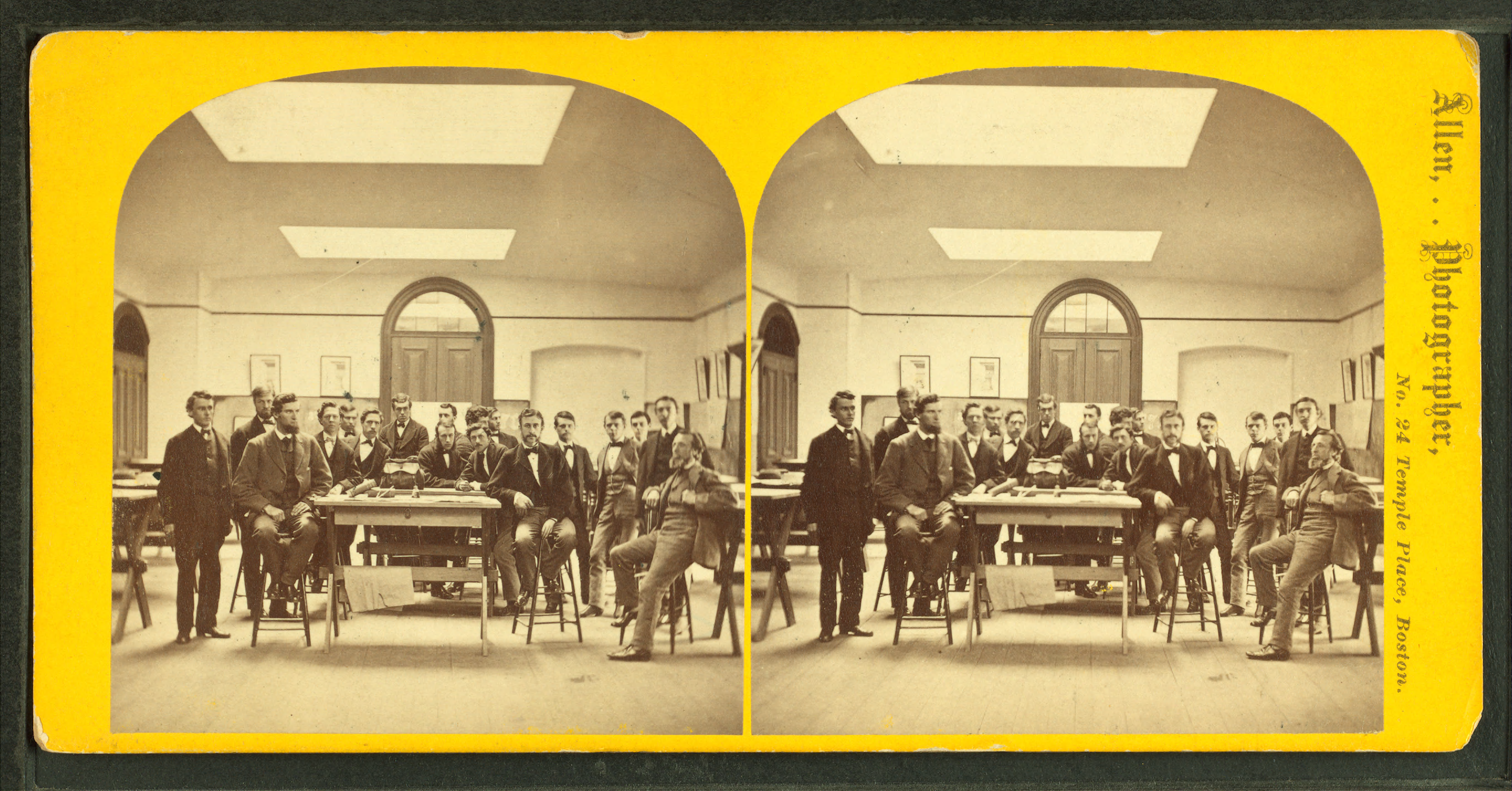
Institute of Technology, Boston, 19th century
