= Second Firsts =

2013 book on grief by Christina Rasmussen

- Title page of the original edition
- Author: Christina Rasmussen
- Cover artist: Nita Ybarra
- Language: English
- Subject: Grief
- Genre: Health; Psychology; Motivational; Counseling; Self-help
- Publisher: Hay House
- Publication date: November 4, 2013
- Publication place: United States
- English publication date: 2013
- Media type: Print
- Website: www.secondfirsts.com

Second Firsts is a 2013 book published by the crisis intervention counselor Christina Rasmussen, in which she introduces a new model of grief based on the science of neuroplasticity. She describes grief as a catalyst for redefining identity, and outlines the process of "reentry", or returning to life.

== Background ==
Christina Rasmussen studied grief at the University of Durham in England, and her Master's thesis is on the subject of bereavement.

On July 21, 2006, Christina's husband of 10 years, Bjarne Rasmussen, died from Stage IV colon cancer. Christina continued working to support her children.

After switching careers, Rasmussen decided in 2010 to focus on her work as an independent grief counselor. Continuing her prior research in the field, she began identifying a pattern of behaviors and beliefs that serve to perpetuate grief and affect quality of life after loss. Aligning her observations with concepts from neuroscience and, more specifically, neuroplasticity, Rasmussen developed a new model of grief.

== Overview ==
Rasmussen's model of grief is known as the Life Reentry Model, referring to the notion that grief is not only a function of coping with loss, but also of each individual's need to "reenter" life. The model echoes concepts previously described by George Bonanno, a clinical psychology professor at Columbia University (Teachers College), and a pioneering researcher in bereavement. For example, the model calls for the grieving individual to use action to recover, parallel to Bonanno's theory of psychological resilience. As well, the model opposes traditionally pervasive theories in the field, such as the stages of grief defined in the Kübler-Ross model, and Freud's description of "grief work".

== Reception ==
Edward J. Benz Jr., president and CEO of the Dana–Farber Cancer Institute, remarked that "Second Firsts shows us why we must start living again and how to go about it. This engaging, touching, and helpful work is a must read for anyone facing or coping with the loss of someone close.”

Anita Moorjani, New York Times best-selling author and survivor of a Near Death Experience (NDE), wrote that "In Second Firsts you will discover how to move from merely surviving to once again thriving."

Karen Salmansohn, a best-selling self-help author, said that "Second Firsts is about creating a bigger life after loss. It is about dreaming of a brand new way to fall in love again with living fully. It is certainly not an easy task, but this little book makes it easier."

Bernie S. Siegel, American writer, former pediatric surgeon, and New Age speaker, said that "Second Firsts can be your life coach, direct you to heal, and create a new life."

In 2012, Second Firsts was featured on Hello Giggles, as well as the blog of The White House.

== See also ==
Psychological resilience
Christina Rasmussen
George Bonanno
Allison Maslan
