= Christina Rasmussen =

American psychologist

- Born: April 21, 1972 (age 54)
- Education: University of Durham; Northeastern University
- Occupations: Founder, author, and CEO of Second Firsts
- Writing career
- Notable work: Second Firsts: Live, Laugh, and Love Again

Christina Rasmussen is a Greek–American crisis intervention counselor and author. She is best known for writing Second Firsts, a 2013 book introducing a new model of grief based on the science of neuroplasticity, as well as creating a grief counseling organization of the same name.

== Background ==
In September 1998, Rasmussen delivered her master's thesis on the stages of grief at the University of Durham in England.

In 2003, Rasmussen's husband of 10 years, Bjarne Rasmussen, was diagnosed with stage IV colon cancer. On July 21, 2006, he died in the intensive care unit of the Dana Farber Cancer Institute at the age of thirty-five.

While grieving, Rasmussen continued working to support her two children. She obtained a graduate certificate in human resource management from Northeastern University, and joined the human resource department at Parexel, a multinational life sciences consulting firm.

In September 2010, she started writing her weekly letter on her site Second Firsts which began her journey as a writer.

On November 4, 2013, her first book Second Firsts was published by Hay House.

The Life Reentry Institute was born in 2017 bringing forth a professional curriculum to allow for professionals to bring Life Reentry into their work.

In December 2018 Rasmussen published her first book with HarperOne, Where Did You Go? It received critical reviews from religious establishments such as the National Catholic Reporter.

== Second Firsts ==
In April 2010, Rasmussen created the Life Reentry Model, a model of grieving based on her professional, academic, and personal observations of the bereavement process. This model is the foundation of her 2013 book, Second Firsts, as well as her grief counseling organization of the same name.

Rasmussen's model of grief operates on the assumption of psychological resilience, echoing the theories introduced by George Bonanno, a professor of clinical psychology at the Teachers College of Columbia University. Her theories conflict with popularized concepts of grief stemming from the 1917 and 1969 publications of Mourning and Melancholia and On Death and Dying by Sigmund Freud and Elisabeth Kübler-Ross, respectively. The defining characteristic of the model proposed by Second Firsts is the view of loss as a catalyst for change and self-growth.

== Reception and influence ==
For her work on Second Firsts, Rasmussen has been featured on the blog of the White House, as well as HelloGiggles, a lifestyle website created by actress Zooey Deschanel.
