= Distress in cancer caregiving =

Type of Medical Caregiving Role

An informal or primary caregiver is an individual in a cancer patient's life that provides unpaid assistance and cancer-related care. Caregiving is defined as the processing of assisting someone who cannot care for themselves, which includes physical, mental, emotional, social, and spiritual needs. Due to the typically late onset of cancer, caregivers are often the spouses or children of patients, but may also be parents, other family members, or close friends.

Taking care of family members at home is a complicated experience. The relationships involved constantly shift and change, in expected and unexpected ways. The expected or expected changes can negatively affect physical health, emotions, social life, and spiritual well-being of the caregiver. Informal caregivers are a major form of support for the cancer patient because they provide most care outside of the hospital environment. This support includes:

- Physical support: management of side effects and late effects of treatment and assistance with personal tasks such as bathing.
- Emotional support
- Financial assistance: helping cover the expenses associated with cancer treatment
- Practical assistance: treatment monitoring, assistance with decision making and assistance with non-personal tasks such as grocery shopping
- Spiritual support

== History ==
With medical advances in cancer screening and treatment, cancer has become a chronic rather than an acute disease with the result that patients survive longer with cancer. As a result, there has been a push towards outpatient care in recent years. Consequently, informal caregivers are now taking on the responsibility of caring for a loved one with cancer. Informal caregivers have become so essential that they are estimated to provide an average of 55% of the care needed. For years, research has been reporting the physical, psychological, financial, social, and spiritual repercussions of cancer on the patient. With the discovery of the distress, particularly psychological, that cancer could cause in patients, researchers also began to investigate whether caring for someone with cancer could have similar effects on informal caregivers. Over the years, many stressors have been identified and the effects of caring for a loved one with cancer are becoming well documented. Research in this area is continuing not only to better understand the caregiver's experience, but also to learn how their adjustment to the caregiver role impacts their ability to provide care to the cancer patient.

== Psychological repercussions ==
=== Patient-caregiver differences ===
Cancer patients and caregivers are psychologically affected by cancer, however the way it affects them differs in many respects. Both patients and caregivers report significant unmet needs in the areas of managing daily life, emotions, and social identity. Studies Indicate that patients are less concerned with these daily life issues than their caregivers. Caregivers may be more concerned with these daily life issues because they are neglecting their own needs in order to improve the care of the patient. Men and women may have different perceptions of the cancer and its effects depending on their role as either the patient or the caregiver.

=== Phases of the cancer trajectory ===
Many researchers and clinicians have divided the cancer trajectory in order to explain the changes that occur to the patient and caregiver at various points throughout the cancer trajectory.

==== Initial or acute phase ====
The initial or acute phase encompasses the time of diagnosis. A number of stressors can lead to caregiver psychological distress with the diagnosis of treatment. At this point in the trajectory, the most salient psychological outcomes revolve around fear, uncertainty, sadness and feelings of powerlessness or helplessness. Additionally, in studies where cancer recurrence was not evaluated, caregivers report the highest levels of anxiety and post-traumatic stress symptoms during this phase. Caregivers are often frightened and upset by the diagnosis of their loved one, but they have an additional responsibility of trying to support the patient as they go through this difficult time. In the process of providing support, caregivers are often overlooked and have no one to turn to with their own concerns. This period is full of uncertainty, with both the patient and the caregiver not knowing what to expect in terms of treatment, recovery, and overall outcome. This can lead to significant psychological distress for some caregivers.

==== Chronic phase ====
The chronic phase encompasses the treatment for cancer. Along with the psychological repercussions typical of the initial phase, many other psychological outcomes become relevant as the patient undergoes cancer treatment due to a number of additional stressors that the caregiver must deal with. These additional stressors may cause "intrapsychic strain, such as guilt or changes in the caregiver's self-concept" (Haley, 2003, p. 153). For a minority of caregivers, they may meet the criteria for a psychiatric diagnosis, typically of depression or an anxiety disorder. But for the majority, any distress they experience does not reach clinically diagnosable levels, although they may exhibit depressive symptoms. Currently, it remains uncertain how levels of psychological distress change with time. Some studies report that psychological distress decreases over time, but others report that it increases. This increase may be a result of caregivers neglecting their own needs while caring for the patient. For some, this emotional repression may lead to feelings of resentment towards the patient. At this point of the trajectory (and ongoing), caregivers may also begin to exhibit symptoms of burnout due to the increased work-burden of caring for someone with cancer. There are many physical and emotional components to burnout. Caregivers may also experience compassion fatigue. In family caregivers, compassion fatigue has been linked to heavier caregiving demands (more than 25 hours per week), limited support systems, and higher caregiver burden. Compassion fatigue is also common in nurses, especially in specific medical environments such as intensive care and oncology. Interventions such as increasing peer and family support as well as improving coping skills have been shown to reduce compassion fatigue. Amongst the emotional components, caregivers may experience frustration, anger, depression, resentment and insecurity.

==== Resolution phase ====
The resolution phase encompasses the completion of treatment, but there are a number of directions that the cancer trajectory can go from this point. For some families, resolution may consist of the movement into palliative care and bereavement. For others, this may involve a transition into survivorship, where the patient may go into remission or may experience cancer recurrence. Caregivers may experience the same fears, uncertainties, burnout and feelings of guilt or sadness as caregivers in the previous stages. However, depending on the path that the family experiences after treatment, there are additional psychological repercussions for caregivers.

==== Palliative care and bereavement ====
Palliative care is an especially demanding task for cancer caregivers than less progressive cancer because the care required for those with terminal cancer tends to be more demanding. Caregivers in this situation often report high caregiver burden lasting the entire period. Caregiver distress also tends to increase as patients progress through this phase, causing a lower caregiver quality of life. In some instances, caregivers even report higher levels of distress than the patient during this phase. Having a difficult time with caregiving increases distress caregivers face as they enter the bereavement period after the death of their loved one, whereas finding meaning in caring for their loved one may relate to better long term adjustment for caregivers. Before bereavement, loved ones often face anticipatory grief, where they mourn and prepare for the loss of their loved one. Families often react with fears of abandonment, anxiety, hopelessness and helplessness, and an intensified attachment to their loved one. Upon the death of their loved one, caregivers typically experience grief, which in a minority of cases may be complicated by a diagnosis of Major Depressive Disorder later in the grief process. Some caregivers experience unresolved grief, which can lead to Prolonged Grief Disorder (PGD), which is included in the eleventh edition of the International Classification of Diseases and the fifth edition of the Diagnostic and Statistical Manual of Mental Disorders. In a 2022 meta-analysis, the prevalence rate of Prolonged Grief Disorder in families experiencing bereavement due to a member with cancer was estimated at 14.2%. Differences in the prevalence of grief disorders among bereaved familial cancer caregivers shows evidence for higher rates of PGD in females, those with a religious affiliation, spousal caregiving, and coping with death from neurological cancer. Females and spouses commonly experience higher burdens from caregiving, as evidence has pointed to them providing more direct care in cancer caregiving. Psychological predictors of poor adjustment to grief include anxiety, depression, psychological distress, demoralization and anticipatory grief symptoms. Pre-loss grief in cancer caregivers, which refers to feeling grief prior to the death of the patient, has been linked to higher prolonged grief rates. Feeling prepared for the death of the patient has also been linked to grief disorders, as unpreparedness has been shown to be associated with prolonged grief and major depressive disorder. A 2024 systematic review, which analyzed bereaved Taiwanese family members involved in cancer care, found that preparedness for death could be related to higher rates of complicated grief. Conversations between the caregiver and healthcare staff on how to better prepare for the impending loss have been shown to be predictors of better adjustment in grief disorders. The caregiver's relationship with the patient pre and post cancer diagnosis has been shown to impact bereavement adjustment. Factors such as, communication problems with the patient and family, ambivalent or dependent relationships with the deceased loved one, family tensions, and difficult decision making, have been shown to impact grief adjustment. Depression and PTSD can be a greater concern for caregivers with unresolved tensions with their loved one, whereas stronger bonds during the palliative phase seems to be related to a healthier transition into bereavement for the caregiver.

==== Survivorship ====
As patients and caregivers enter the survivorship period after the completion of primary treatment, they often feel uncertain and overwhelmed by what lies before them. Patients often leave their last treatment session without much direction as to what they should expect next. This is distressing for the caregiver as well because caregiving continues into this phase of the cancer trajectory because of the long-term and late effects of treatment, the psychological distress patients face, and any other related factors. Overall, caregivers report worsened quality of life. Typically, younger caregivers and spouses of the cancer patient have greater unmet needs, which was strongly associated with seeing caregiving as overwhelming. In the first 2 years of survivorship, younger caregivers reported greater unmet psychological, medical, financial, and everyday needs. At 5 years, younger caregivers only reported everyday activity needs insufficient. Wealthier caregivers reported less financial struggles but more unfulfilled everyday needs. A common concern faced by survivors and their caregivers is how to return to their "normal" life without cancer, while managing the feeling of being "lost in transition" within the healthcare system. Survivors and caregivers are often uncertain and fearful about death and cancer recurrence, even in the absence of cancer-related symptoms.

==== Recurrence ====
Cancer recurrence has been called "one of the most stressful events in the course of illness for both patients and their families". Caregivers do worry about cancer recurring just as much as or more than cancer survivors. Generally, caregivers report worsened quality of life due to recurrence or fear of recurrence (FCR). Similar to cancer survivors, caregivers' FCR is significantly associated with depression and anxiety. Caring for those with worse overall health is associated with higher FCR. The caregiver's FCR can increase if there is an upcoming follow-up medical appointment for the survivor. Caregivers are found to play a protective role for survivors, which explains why they adopt similar behaviors to the survivors.

== Physical repercussions ==
Along with psychological repercussions of cancer, some caregivers also experience physical effects due to caregiving. This is particularly true of highly burdensome caregiving, as is typically the case with older or palliative patients. Commonly, caregivers report sleep disturbances, such as fatigue or insomnia. In caregivers of advanced stage patients, these disturbed sleep patterns are associated with symptoms of depression. Sometimes, caregivers may also experience a loss of appetite or may meet the criteria for an eating disorder. For caregivers experiencing burnout, there are also often physical effects. These include: headaches, insomnia, backaches, lethargy, lingering colds, gastrointestinal upset, and cardiovascular problems. Other reported physical repercussions of caregiving include: impaired immunity, high blood pressure, and arthritis. As is the case with psychological distress, research suggests that the physical repercussions that caregivers experience may be due to them neglecting their own needs and physical health in order to improve the care of the patient.

== Stressors ==
=== Social ===
A number of factors regarding relationships with the patient, spouse, family or others can increase caregiver distress. One major factor is the social role changes they often face – for example, being a caregiver and a parent. Caregiving can also cause a decrease in the social activities that the caregiver usually engages in because they are required to take on extra tasks to help their loved one. For some caregivers, this role strain can cause depression, resentment, or a loss of intimacy with the patient. In some families, the stress of caregiving can also lead to increased family conflict. For most ill patients and their spousal caregivers, scores of marital satisfaction tend to be very similar to the normal population. But for a minority, cancer and caregiving can cause relationship strain and can impact the couple's intimacy. Depending on the type of cancer, caregivers have also reported changes in their sexual relationships (usually decreases in sexual activity). This may be because of the physical changes and body image issues certain cancer patients can face from treatment or from the cancer itself.

=== Lack of knowledge or experience ===
There are often issues cited with the dissemination of practical knowledge for caregivers of cancer patients. Caregivers often feel underprepared when taking on a caregiver role because they are misinformed, or do not have full information, on the progression the disease may take or the treatment needed for it. There is also a lack of information or communication between the caregiver and medical staff regarding how they should provide care. Often, caregivers have little knowledge of the resources available to them to assist in their roles, or to help them cope with the psychological difficulties they themselves are having. Educating the caregiver has been shown to decrease stress levels.

=== Economic ===
Caregivers with low income tend to have a more negative caregiver experience. Some spousal caregivers may feel required to quit their job in order to fulfill care requirements. Other partners may choose to work more in order to try to offset some of the financial pressures. The fiscal pressures of losing an income source, increasing expenditures to pay for treatment, and having a lower household income to pay for daily expenditures have been linked with causing significant distress in caregivers.

=== Patient characteristics ===
The physical and mental impairments that are caused by cancer may also cause significant problems for the caregiver. The patients' ability to function on their own and to independently take care of themselves, termed functional status, has a strong effect on caregivers. Caregivers of patients with low functionality, or who almost entirely rely on the caregiver for their needs, may cause particular distress for the caregiver. Strongly linked to this, the type of help that caregivers are required to provide may be a stronger predictor of their caregiver burden than the time they must commit to helping. This is a function of the patient's functional status: having to help with personal tasks because the patient is unable to take care of himself or herself tends to cause greater caregiver burden than having to engage in non-personal tasks. Survivors who suffer from a decreased mental capacity, much like low functioning survivors, also put increased strain on their caregivers. The duration of care, and the patient's ability to cope with the symptoms of cancer and cancer treatment have also been linked to the levels of distress reported by caregivers. In addition, patients who show more distress, concern or hopelessness, or who appraise the illness or caregiving more negatively tend to have caregivers with a lower quality of life.

== Other variables ==
=== Gender ===
Results about the differential effects of gender on patient and caregiver distress are mixed, but a recent meta-analysis has indicated that regardless of role (i.e. patient or caregiver), women are more distressed by cancer than men. It is widely known that women play significant roles in health by being primary caregivers, for their families and working in healthcare, both formally and informally. There are patterns in society that reinforce and continue differences and inequalities between men and women when caring for someone with cancer. Women who care for their spouses often feel overly responsible and may sacrifice their own needs more than men in similar roles. These caregiving roles for women often lack support, recognition, and pay. Women often have a double burden, in terms of working a job and being a care provider for the family. Women who care for both of their parents have reported negative effects on their marriage, more than effects reported by husbands in spousal caregiving. Daughter caregivers, who care for a loved one with cancer, report greater levels of anxiety and depression in comparison to husbands providing care to a spouse. Husband caregivers may deny feelings of depression, due to traditional gender roles, which can create adverse effects on the family unit. Research has shown that wives providing care for their husbands reported emotional distress due to the lack of communication husband's elicited in regards to their emotions.

=== Age ===
The age of the patient and caregiver can affect the psychological effect that cancer has on them. However, which age group of caregivers (young adult, middle age or elderly) are more distressed by caregiving is still unconfirmed. Some suggest that younger caregivers suffer from more psychological distress, but others suggest that elderly caregivers are more at risk for distress. This may be a function of the phase of the cancer trajectory that caregivers are undergoing: studies tend to find high distress amongst younger caregivers in the acute and chronic phases, and high distress amongst elderly caregivers in the resolution (specifically, bereavement) phase of caregiving. Elderly caregivers are also at greater risk for negative effects on their physical health than are younger caregivers. Older caregivers are more likely to have comorbid health conditions and decreased physical ability. In relation to their psychological health, older caregivers may be at higher risk because of a higher likelihood of social isolation than younger caregivers. However, older caregivers are usually more satisfied with their role than are younger caregivers. Among women, this may be explained by the finding that younger female caregivers tend to perceive demands on their time due to role strain more negatively. Role strain tends to be more severe for later middle age caregivers due to their many responsibilities with family and work. Caregivers in this age group may also be more prone to emotional distress, and ultimately, a decreased quality of life. This is because the caregivers are at higher risk of experiencing social isolation, career interruption, and a lack of time for themselves, their families and their friends. The age of the cancer patient can also affect the physical and psychological burden on caregivers. Given that the highest percentage of individuals with cancer are older adults, caregiving for older cancer patients can be complicated by other comorbid diseases such as dementia. The spouses of elderly cancer patients are likely to be elderly themselves, which may cause the caregiving to take an even more significant toll on their well being.

=== Socioeconomic status ===
Individuals of lower socio-economic status may experience the increased burden of financial strain due to the expenses involved in cancer care. Research has shown that many family caregivers suffer from financial difficulties, such as cutting down time at work or having to quit their job due to the burden of caregiving. Several studies have highlighted many more adverse outcomes in caregiving related to finances including lost hours, lower retirement benefits, and depending on others for financial aid. This may cause them to experience more psychological distress from cancer caregiving than other caregivers. Caregivers with lower levels of education have been shown to report more satisfaction from caregiving.

=== Outlook/perspective ===
Caregivers can sustain their quality of life by deriving self-esteem from caregiving. Caregivers' beliefs and perceptions can also strongly impact their adjustment to caregiving. For instance, caregivers who believe their coping strategies are effective, or caregivers who perceive sufficient help from their support networks, are less likely to be depressed. In fact, these factors relate more strongly to their levels of depression than stress does.

=== Personality factors and coping patterns ===
Personality factors may play a role in caregiver adjustment to cancer. For instance, caregivers that are high on neuroticism are more likely to suffer from depression. On the other hand, caregivers that are more optimistic or who acquire a sense of mastery from caregiving tend to adjust better to the experience. Caregivers who remain emotionally resilient and maintain a realistic attitude and approach to care have been shown to cope well with adverse health outcomes. Along these lines, caregivers who use problem-solving coping strategies or who seek social support are less distressed than those that use avoidant or impulsive strategies. Some caregivers also report that spirituality helps them cope with the difficulties of caregiving and watching a loved one endure their cancer. A 2020 literature review, found that caregivers who are affiliated with religion have lower rates of major depression. Religious beliefs may aid in coping, as faith may motivate individuals to endure the difficulties of caregiving. Religious practices such as, meditation, pastoral care, and bible readings, have been shown to be effective coping skills.

=== Relationship to patient ===
The caregiver's relationship to the patient can be an important factor in their adjustment to caregiving. Spouses, followed by adult daughters, are the most likely family members to provide care. Spouses generally tend to have the most difficulty adjusting to this experience, especially the female spouse. Wives who care for their husbands often feel more negative effects from caregiving. Adult daughters also tend to express difficulty, which may be a factor of age more-so than the relationship with the patient in that spouses tend to be older caregivers than adult children.

== Interventions ==
Research has suggested that psychosocial interventions may improve the distress of cancer caregivers. There are many types of interventions available, including educational, problem-solving skills training, cognitive-behavioral therapy, interventions for young adults and adolescent caregivers, music therapy, grief therapy, and religious/spiritual interventions.

=== Grief and Bereavement-Focused Therapy ===
Family-focused grief therapy has been shown to significantly improve overall distress levels and depression in those affected by cancer. Interventions designed to identify vulnerable caregivers before the patient's death can help prevent caregivers from experiencing abnormal grief up to 12 months post-loss. To identify vulnerable familial caregivers, interventions need to focus on specific demographic characteristics that predict grief disorders (older age, women, spousal caregivers, lack of religion, lack of social support, caregiver burden, closeness to the patient, and unpreparedness for death) and the presence of a dysfunctional family unit. Interventions that show effectiveness for grief disorders in bereaved cancer caregivers include cognitive-behavioral models, which include web-based therapies and interventions that identify dysfunction in a family unit. Both, early hospice referrals and hospital bereavement support programs, have been shown to help bereaved family caregivers and reduce barriers in accessibility. Depression in caregivers may be pronounced if the cancer patient is enrolled in hospice nearing death as opposed to earlier in the palliative care journey. Early hospice enrollment and preventing the patient from dying in a hospital have been associated to better grief outcomes in cancer caregivers.

=== Educational Therapy ===
Interventions that increased patients general knowledge about their specific disease have been reported to reduce anxiety, distress and help them take a more active part in the decision making process. Interventions by members of the healthcare system designed to teach caregivers proficiency in both the physical and psychological care of patients have been shown to benefit both partners. Interventions that focus on both the patient and the caregiver as a couple have proven more effective in helping adaptation to cancer than those that try to help the patient or caregiver individually, largely due to the inclusion of training in supportive communication, sexual counselling and partner support.

=== Cognitive Behavioral Therapy (CBT) ===
Cognitive behavioral therapy (CBT) has yielded mixed outcomes for caregivers, requiring more in-depth research. A systematic review found that CBT has an overall statistically significant effect on caregivers, but not within randomized controlled trials. But, there was a statistically significant effect size for caregivers of cancer survivors. Cognitive behavioral therapy for insomnia (CBT-I) has been shown to improve typical contributors to distress in caregivers such as insomnia, hyperarousal, anxiety, and fatigue. A randomized controlled trial of lung cancer patients showed that CBT was more effective in lowering emotional vulnerability compared to the integrative body-mind-spirit intervention (I-BMS). But, I-BMS improved quality of life and spiritual care, and reduced depression more than CBT. Scholars have designed and tested therapies that extend from CBT practices, that are more tailored to cancer caregivers' unique distress. For example, emotion regulation therapy (ERT) combines CBT practices with emotion-focused therapy to focus on perseverative negative thinking (PNT). ERT was showed a decrease in PNT, depressive symptoms, worry, and anxiety, as well as improvement in emotion regulation. Mindfulness-Based Stress Reduction (MBSR) and Acceptance and Commitment Therapy (ACT) are also derived from CBT and are conducted on patient-caregiver dyads.

=== Interventions for Young Adults/Adolescent Caregivers ===
Interventions targeting young adults or adolescents (15–25 years) are especially needed, as in comparison with younger children, they are more likely to avoid coping or talking about their feelings related to the death of a sibling from cancer. This age group, who has experienced the death of a parent or sibling to cancer, has been shown to have an increased likelihood for several adverse psychosocial impacts including separation anxiety disorder, self-harm, substance abuse disorder, and conduct disorder. Interventions that target unmet needs reported by young adults and adolescents, such as social support and help with coping skills, could prevent grief and distress post-loss. Support groups for young adults and adolescents who have lost a parent to cancer have been shown to improve life satisfaction and global wellbeing.

=== Music Therapy ===
Music therapy is another psychosocial intervention used to reduce distress among caregivers of people with cancer. There are mixed opinions as to whether music therapy makes a difference or not on cancer caregiver distress due to limited research and biases. Some studies showed that music therapy could ease symptoms of anxiety, depression, and distress in caregivers while also promoting reflection, relaxation, and communication. Shared music-making for caregivers has been shown to strengthen relationships and help build community.

=== Religion and Spirituality ===
==== Coping Strategies ====
Spirituality has been demonstrated to be interrelated with quality of life and intertwined between caregivers and cancer patients. Spiritual coping entails using spiritual methods or resources to overcome tough situations. Psychosocial behaviors such as self-efficacy, anxiety, or depression of either the caregiver or patient impacts the others' spiritual coping. Examples of positive spiritual coping are seeking connections, meaning, or support. Negative spiritual coping may foster as feeling abandoned or punished. Spiritual well-being protects against demoralization, which can increase in both caregivers and patients when approaching the patient's death. Demoralization is associated with spiritual and psychological distress rather than the burden of daily caregiving tasks. Religion has been shown to be a protective factor on bereavement outcomes in bereaved family cancer caregivers. In a 2024 systematic review, bereaved Taiwanese caregivers felt comforted by continuing a relationship with the deceased patient by performing rituals and ancestor worship, serving as a protective factor in the grieving process. Religion is also a resilience factor for caregivers. Among caregivers of patients with brain cancer, common religious and spiritual coping strategies include praying, getting support from religious authorities, and discussing death anxiety.

==== Interventions ====
The "Hear My Voice" intervention allows for brain cancer patients to voice their spiritual beliefs, values, and wisdom, which are then transcribed and returned to the patient and their loved ones. This was found to increase positive religious coping, quality of life, and spiritual wellbeing among the caregivers and patients. The Care for the Cancer Caregiver workshop increased caregivers' sense of meaning, but not at a significant level. However, Meaning-Centered Psychology for Cancer Caregivers (MCP-C) showed a significant increase in caregivers' sense of meaning. A randomized controlled trial on dyads of caregivers and patients with gastrointestinal cancer found that peer helping combined with coping skills intervention did not enhance their spiritual well-being. Family participatory dignity therapy (FPDT) for dyads of caregivers and patients with hematological cancer showed a statistically significant increase in hope and spiritual well-being for the patients. Given the dyadic nature of this study, caregivers may have experienced similar changes, but the study did not explicitly measure caregivers' hope or spiritual well-being.

== Benefits ==
Not every caregiver experiences only negative consequences from cancer caregiving. For some caregivers, there are personal benefits that stem from caring for their loved one, and the benefits found might help to buffer the negative experiences that caregivers frequently face. The concept of post-traumatic growth is of particular note when discussing the benefits of cancer caregiving, and cancer in general. Post-traumatic growth is a positive psychological growth that occurs as a result of a traumatic incident. Studies have found that within the cancer caregiver population, strong predictors of post-traumatic growth are: less education, being employed, or displaying high avoidance tendencies pre-surgery, and framing coping strategies in a positive style. Furthermore, individuals who engage in religious coping or have high perceived social support are more likely to report post-traumatic growth. Other benefits of caregiving include: an improved sense of self-worth, increased self-satisfaction, a sense of mastery, increased intimacy with their ill loved one, and a sense of meaning. Experiencing a loved one's cancer may also cause significant lifestyle changes for caregivers. For instance, caregivers may become more proactive by engaging in health behaviours such as increased exercise, better diets and increased screening. However, this finding is not conclusive; some studies report that certain behaviours such as screening tend to decrease amongst caregivers.

== See also ==
- Care work
