= Ambiguous loss =

Loss without closure or clear understanding

Ambiguous loss is a loss that occurs without a significant likelihood of reaching emotional closure or a clear understanding. This kind of loss leaves a person searching for answers, and thus complicates and delays the process of grieving, and often results in unresolved grief. Causes include infertility, termination of pregnancy, disappearance of a family member, estrangement, death of an ex-spouse, and a family member being physically alive but in a state of cognitive decline due to Alzheimer's disease.

An ambiguous loss can be categorized into two types of loss: physical or psychological. Physical loss and psychological loss differ in terms of what is being grieved for, the loss of the physical body, or the psychological mind. Experiencing an ambiguous loss can lead to personal questions, such as, "Am I still married to my missing spouse?," or "Am I still a child to a parent who no longer remembers me?". Since the grief process in an ambiguous loss is halted, it is harder to cope or move on to acceptance from the type of loss experienced. There are various types of grief that can occur due to the type of ambiguity experienced and corresponding therapy techniques to address the certain types of grief. The overall goal of therapy to cope with ambiguous loss is to overcome the trauma associated with it and restore resilience.

== Origin of concept ==
The term "ambiguous loss" was first used in the late 1970s by Pauline Boss, a researcher who studied families of soldiers who went missing in action. From 1973 to 1977, Boss had used the term "boundary ambiguity", but she later replaced that with "ambiguous loss".

== Types ==
An ambiguous loss can be physical or psychological in nature.

=== Physical loss ===
A physical ambiguous loss means that the body of a loved one is no longer around, such as a missing person or unrecovered body from war, but is still remembered psychologically due to the chance of coming back, for example in missing person cases. A physical ambiguous loss can occur across generations, such as with the families of victims of genocides, and can cause traumatic distress as posttraumatic stress disorder.

=== Psychological loss ===
The second type of ambiguous loss is where a person is still physically there, but is psychologically absent. This happens in cases where the brain is affected, therefore affecting the behavior or well-being of the individual. Psychological ambiguous loss does not just occur to family and friends of the person affected.

Psychological loss can happen personally in terms of one losing sense of who one is. This can stem from having a traumatic brain injury and cause a lost feeling and uncertain identity issues. This type of loss can also be experienced by people who leave certain groups, such as Jehovah's Witnesses.

== Grieving process ==
The grieving process for an ambiguous loss differs from regular mourning in that one is unable to gain closure due to unresolved grief. In cases of a psychological ambiguous loss, the grieving process can be especially difficult because of the inability to accept or admit that there is a problem and confront the situation in the first place to deal with the issue. One key factor in getting over an ambiguous loss is resilience. In the normal grieving process, people obtain closure after dealing with a loss. In an ambiguous loss, closure does not exist, and should not be sought in this case.

=== Resilience ===
Resilience and hope are important in the case of an ambiguous loss because paired together, they are able to allow the individual to come to terms with the loss and continue moving forward in life. One way to tell that someone is resilient in a case with ambiguous loss is that they actively seek out help when they know it is needed. Uncontrollable factors such as culture, age, socioeconomic status, and genetics are all factors that contribute to resilience. Trauma and ambiguous loss often co-exist together and if the trauma is not dealt with it can trigger unresolved emotions. Therapy will address a case of ambiguous loss by restoring resilience, and reconnecting with the loss and the relationship with whom the loss is associated.

=== Three types of grief ===
The difference between regular grief and grief from an ambiguous loss occurs because the type of loss creates the type of grief experienced. Grief in ambiguous loss can be both beneficial and difficult. As the grief in an ambiguous loss differs from the progressions of regular grief there is no time pressure to move on or achieve closure. This allows for people to remember a lost loved one and move on with relationships and life. There are three specific types of grief that can develop from the type of ambiguous loss.

==== Anticipatory grief ====
Anticipatory grief occurs before bereavement, mourning after death occurs, and upon realizing that death may be imminent for a loved one, anticipatory grief sets in. This type of grief is common among families who have a loved one living with Alzheimer's disease. The grief becomes anticipatory due to the knowledge that the loved one's mental state will only become worse, so the grieving process can start very early.

==== Disenfranchised grief ====
The second type of grief that can develop from an ambiguous loss is disenfranchised grief. It is also known as unrecognized grief because it often occurs in the loss of someone or something not taken as seriously by others, e.g. a beloved pet. Ecological Grief or Climate Grief has also been identified as a form of disenfranchised grief.

==== Frozen grief ====
Frozen grief is the third type of grief, it is a result of the ambiguity of death because of the physical or psychological disappearance and therefore one's grief is frozen since they do not get a chance to let grief run a normal course.

== See also ==
- Anticipatory grief
- Delayed grief
- Disenfranchised grief
