= Disenfranchised grief =

Grief that is not acknowledged as legitimate by society

Disenfranchised grief is a term coined by Dr. Kenneth J. Doka in 1989 to describe forms of grief that are not acknowledged on a personal or societal level. Observers may take issue with a mourner's expression of grief or view their loss as insignificant, which can lead to feelings of isolation and doubt over the impact of the loss experienced. This concept is viewed as a "type of grief", but it can be viewed as a "side effect" of grief. This is not only applicable to grief in the case of death, but also many other forms of grief. There are few support systems, rituals, traditions, or institutions, such as bereavement leave, available to those experiencing grief and loss.

Even widely recognized forms of grief can become disenfranchised when well-meaning friends and family attempt to set a time limit on a bereaved person's right to grieve. For example, the need to regulate mourning and restore a state of normal work activity severely impacted the grieving process of victims of the Oklahoma City bombing, according to American scholar Edward Linenthal. Grieving for deceased children was redefined as post-traumatic stress disorder if parents were not "over it" within two weeks.

== Disenfranchised losses ==
Examples of events that may lead to disenfranchised grief include:

- deaths among distant, disapproved, or unrecognized relationships:
  - the death of a friend, co-worker, or patient
  - the death of an ex-spouse or a partner in an extramarital affair
  - the death of a partner or chosen family member in an gay, polyamorous, asexual, or otherwise non-heteronormative relationship
  - the death of a pet
- deaths under socially difficult circumstances:
  - the death of a loved one due to suicide or murder
  - a death due to socially stigmatized cause, such as HIV/AIDS, drug addiction, or lung cancer
  - a death due to capital punishment of a criminal
- losses that society deems less worthy of grief than the death of a child or adult:
  - a parent's loss or surrender of a child to adoption or foster care
  - a pregnancy loss (i.e. miscarriage and stillbirth)
- other non-death losses:
  - the loss of a relationship with a person who has become severely disabled (e.g., comatose, advanced stages of dementia)
  - a trauma in the family a generation prior
  - the loss of a home or place of residence
  - the loss of a job

== Disenfranchised grievers ==
Sometimes, people believe that a particular person is not capable of grieving. This commonly happens with very young children and disabled people.

Additionally, grieving people may be disenfranchised because of their circumstances.

Loss of a grandchild can be extremely difficult for a grandparent, but the grandparent's grief is often disenfranchised because they are not part of the immediate family. Attention and support is given to the child's parents and siblings, but the grandparent's grief is two-fold as they are not only grieving the loss of their grandchild, but also for their adult children who have lost their child. This phenomenon is termed double-grief by Davidson and it makes bereavement even more difficult.

Loss of an ex-spouse is disenfranchised due to the lack of a current personal relationship between the former couple. Although the marriage has ended, the relationship has not, and there are ties between the two people that will forever be there, including shared children, mutual friendships, and financial connections. Research has shown that those couples who never resolved conflicts after the relationship ended experienced much more grief than those who had. The grievers experience guilt and thoughts of "what might have been" similar to those of widows.

Loss of a child by adoption is often disenfranchised, because the decision to give a child up for adoption is voluntary and therefore it is not socially acceptable to grieve. Birth mothers lack support, and are expected to just move on and pretend the child does not exist. Many birth mothers experience regret and have thoughts of what might have been or of reuniting with the child.

== Relationships ==
Many types of relationships are not legitimized by society; therefore when one person in the relationship dies, the other may not have their grief legitimized and the grief becomes disenfranchised. Following the death of a partner in a homosexual relationship, societal support tends to prioritize the immediate family, invalidating the significance of the romantic relationship and loss for the grieving partner (McNutt & Yakushko, 2013).

Another example may be a former partner, such as the death of an ex-spouse. The death of an ex-spouse does not typically receive the same recognition as the death of a current spouse. Another type of relationship is one in which the griever and the person who died did not necessarily have a close personal relationship. This relationship may include coworkers, doctor and nurse relationships with patients, or even people that the griever does not know personally at all, such as celebrities. Relationships formed online are often not recognized or validated by society, for example where friendships are made through online games and social media. However, when one person dies, the griever will often experience disenfranchised grief (Doka, 1989).

== Responses ==
There are many models for dealing with grief. The Kübler-Ross model describes grieving in five steps or stages: denial, anger, bargaining, depression, and acceptance (Kübler-Ross, 1969). In other words, in order to begin grieving, one must first endorse the loss, and then express emotion. The griever must then accept the loss and adjust to the change the death or loss caused in his or her life (Cordaro, 2012). Over the years, however, how grief is conceptualized has moved away from predictable stages that lead to 'recovery' or 'closure', towards an understanding of grief that addresses the complexity and diversity of the grieving experience (Australian Psychological Society, 2016). Models such as Worden's tasks of grief (2008) and the dual-process model (Stroebe and Schutt, 1999) offer frameworks for dealing with grief in a way that enhances the self awareness of the grieving person (Australian Psychological Society, 2016).

Disenfranchised grief presents some complications that are not always present in other grieving processes. First, there are usually intensified reactions to death or loss. For example, the griever may become more depressed or angry due to not being able to fully express their grief. Secondly, disenfranchised grief means society does not recognize the death or loss; therefore, the griever does not receive strong social support and may be isolated. As disenfranchised grief is not legitimized by others, the bereaved person may be denied access to rituals, ceremonies, or the right to express their thoughts and emotions (McKissock & McKissock, 1998). When supporting someone through disenfranchised grief it is important to acknowledge and validate their loss and grief (McKissock & McKissock, 1998).

== See also ==
- Ambiguous loss
- Anticipatory grief
- Delayed grief
- Grief

== Sources ==
- Aloi, J. A. (2009). "Nursing the disenfranchised: Women who have relinquished an infant for adoption". Journal of Psychiatric and Mental Health Nursing, 16(1), 27–31. doi:10.1111/j.1365-2850.2008.01324.x
- Cordaro, M. (2012). "Pet loss and disenfranchised grief: Implications for mental health counseling practice". Journal of Mental Health Counseling, 34(4), 283–294.
- Doka, K. J. (1989). Disenfranchised grief: Recognizing hidden sorrow. Lexington, MA, England: Lexington Books/D. C. Heath and Com.
- Havelin, L. (2012, February 3). Children and Pet Loss. Retrieved October 22, 2014.
- Humphrey, K. (2009). Counseling strategies for loss and grief. Alexandria, VA: American Counseling Association.
- Kamerman, J. (1993). "Latent functions of enfranchising the disenfranchised griever". Death Studies, 17(3), 281–287
- Kubler-Ross, E. (1969). On death and dying. New York, NY: Scribner.
- McNutt, B., & Yakushko, O. (2013). "Disenfranchised grief among lesbian and gay bereaved individuals". Journal of LGBT Issues in Counseling, 7(1), 87–116.
- Perrucci, A. (2014, October 7). "High court refuses to rule—and gives tacit victory—on same-sex marriage". Retrieved October 22, 2014.
- Purtuesi D.R. (1995). "Silent voices heard: impact of the birth-mother's experience then and now".
- Some, Sobonfu (Photographer). (2012, May). Embracing Grief.
