= Grief counseling =

Therapy for responses to loss

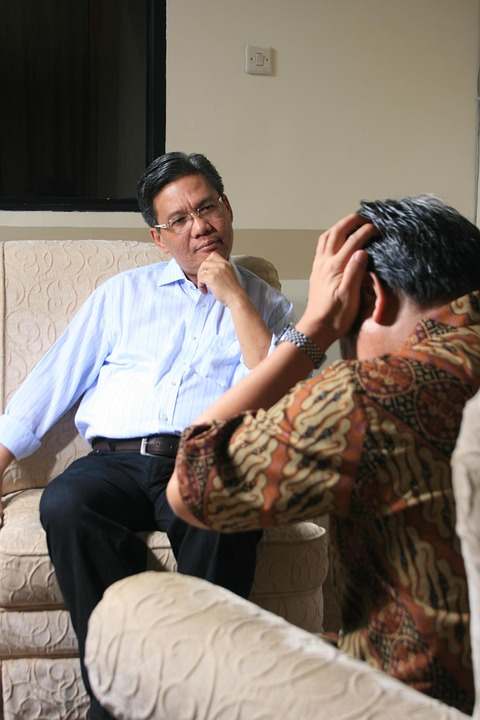
A man working with his counsellor

Grief counseling is a form of psychotherapy that aims to help people cope with the physical, emotional, social, spiritual, and cognitive responses to loss. These experiences are commonly thought to be brought on by a loved person's death, but may more broadly be understood as shaped by any significant life-altering loss (e.g., divorce, home foreclosure, or job loss).

Grief counselors believe that everyone experiences and expresses grief in personally unique ways that are shaped by family background, culture, life experiences, personal values, and intrinsic beliefs. They believe that it is not uncommon for a person to withdraw from their friends and family and feel helpless; some might be angry and want to take action. Some may laugh while others experience strong regrets or guilt. Tears or the lack of crying can both be seen as appropriate expressions of grief.

Grief counselors know that one can expect a wide range of emotion and behavior associated with grief. Some counselors believe that in virtually all places and cultures, the grieving person benefits from the support of others. Further, grief counselors believe that where such support is lacking, counseling may provide an avenue for healthy resolution. Grief counselors also believe that the grieving process can be interrupted in certain situations. For example, this may happen when the bereaved person must simultaneously deal with practical matters of survival or take on the role of being the strong one holding the family together. In such cases, grief may remain unresolved and later resurface as an issue requiring counseling.

== Counseling ==
Grief counseling is commonly recommended for individuals who experience difficulties dealing with a personally significant loss. Grief counseling facilitates expression of emotion and thought about the loss, including their feeling sad, anxious, angry, lonely, guilty, relieved, isolated, confused etc.

Grief counseling facilitates the process of coming to terms with the loss that the individual has experienced, and processing through the natural progression of feelings that might come with different stages of coping with the loss. Grief counseling sessions also encompass segments on increasing an individual's personal and social resources to cope better with grief. There are considerable resources online covering grief or loss counseling such as the Grief Counseling Resource Guide from the New York State Office of Mental Health.

== Emotional Disclosure ==
Emotional disclosure means to openly talk about emotions a person is going through during a time of trauma or distress. Being emotionally vulnerable can be difficult for many, especially for men in a society where they are taught to hide their emotions. Therefore, during a time of bereavement, not everyone will be open to discussing their emotions, even with family or friends. Complicated grief can cause people to hide their feelings or deny them. People can often isolate during a time of grief, which can lead to rumination and aggravate depressive symptoms. The benefits of disclosing emotions can alleviate distress and help process loss more efficiently. Social relationships have proven to be helpful in processing traumatic events. If one is self-conscious about disclosure to friends or family, grief counseling is a great option for a private, empathetic space.

== Types of grief ==
There are various types of grief that individuals might go through. The most commonly seen types of grief fall into these four categories:

Anticipatory grief

Anticipatory grief refers to a sense of loss before the actual occurrence of loss. This can occur when a loved one has a terminal illness, or one is personally being diagnosed with a chronic illness, or when one faces the imminent loss of some human function. For the dying person or person diagnosed with a terminal illness, they may experience preparatory grief. This is a type of grief stemmed from anticipatory grief, only it focuses on the perspective of the dying person.

Normal grief

Normal grief is the natural experience of loss and emotions accompanies the death of a loved one, and usually subsides in intensity over time. Normal grief is usually accompanied by the symptoms of a depressed mood, sleep disturbances, and crying.

Complicated grief

Grief that is prolonged and results in severe behavioral concerns such as suicidal ideation, addictions, risk-taking behavior, or displaying symptoms of mental health concerns. Research shows up to 10% of bereaved adults may experience prolonged grief. The terms prolonged grief and complicated grief can be interchangeable. Prolonged grief is the most recent term used to describe the grieving process that intensifies over a long period of time. This time frame of grief is acknowledged to take about a year based on Western science, although that is not true for everyone. There is no timeline to grieving, and the process may have different effects on people, which is where the term complicated grief becomes more significant. Complicated grief helps define different grieving experiences, such as grief showing up in a person's life several years later, grief unveiling past traumas, phobias of death, or even having complicated emotions towards the person who has passed. In these situations, more in-depth counseling and psychotherapy would be important in helping the individual recover from the traumatic loss.

=== Prolonged Grief ===
Prolonged grief (PG) disorder (PGD) is an intensity of grief that lasts longer than the allotted time for some adjustment, to the point of disrupting a person's life. A study was done on family carers of palliative care patients. Family carers are susceptible to higher rates of psychological distress during care and the bereavement period. Therefore, the study was created to see if carers may be at higher risk for PG after the death of the patient. A longitudinal study was performed to assess psychological distress measures before care, six months after death, along with 13 months post death, sociodemographic variables, and care-related factors. The results showed that screening family carers before they assist with palliative care for PG can show who is at higher risk. This is helpful for people to know so that they can get the support they need during care and prepare themselves after the death. Palliative carers know that death is coming for their family member, so they are a little more prepared. For those grieving an unexpected loss, there is still a possibility of PG or PGD to occur. Prolonged grief can sometimes lead to clinical depression if it lasts a while, therefore, it is crucial to seek professional help, such as grief counseling.

Disenfranchised grief

Disenfranchised grief is grief that is not made known to, or not recognized by, others. An example could be the case of an extramarital lover whose lover passed on. In these cases, the grieving process is compromised as they are unable to process through this grief with others and receive the social support they need to overcome their grief.

== Spiritual and faith-based approaches ==
For many individuals, grief support is sought within spiritual or religious communities rather than through clinical settings. Faith-based grief counseling often incorporates theological frameworks, sacred texts, and religious rituals to help bereaved individuals find meaning and consolation. In Christian contexts, this may involve the concept of a "ministry of consolation" where clergy and trained lay volunteers provide support rooted in their faith traditions.

Some approaches draw specifically on monastic wisdom and spiritual practices. For example, Grief on the Road to Emmaus: A Monastic Approach to Journeying with the Bereaved (2023) by Beth L. Hewett applies eight principles from the Rule of Saint Benedict—love, mutuality, hospitality, listening, prayer, humility, action, and community—to bereavement ministry. The book uses the biblical Road to Emmaus narrative as a model for how caregivers can walk alongside grieving individuals, witnessing their pain and offering presence before attempting to provide answers. While written from a Catholic perspective, such frameworks can often be adapted for ecumenical or interfaith settings.

== Theories on the grief cycle ==
The most commonly acknowledged and cited grief model is the Five Stages of Grief by Elisabeth Kübler-Ross, which posits that individuals who experience grief tend to go through a cycle of these five stages:

1. Denial – Arises as a result of the shock experienced by individuals, and can manifest in the form of numbness, nonchalance, or avoidance. This is a survival instinct of the mind to help individuals pace out the emotional impact that the loss has on the individual.
2. Anger – After the reality of the individual's death has set in, anger sets in as well, as individuals starts placing the blame on others or themselves. They might also question their religion.
3. Bargaining – At the stage, individuals might begin to ask many "If Only" and "What If" questions, imagining what could have been, should surrounding circumstances be different.
4. Depression – This stage is when sadness and feelings of hopelessness sets in, as one realises the irreversibility of death. The emptiness experienced as a result of the gap that is left when the loved one passed on becomes apparent, and the grieving individual questions whether he/she would be able to live a happy life without the deceased. A common question asked at this point is, "Is there really a point in living?". It is important, however, to note that depression in this context does not refer to the mental disorder but rather strong feelings of sadness and hopelessness.
5. Acceptance – After some time, the individual might adjust to life without the deceased. At this point, the individual might make the conclusion that this is a reality that he/she would have to manage, and make an effort to engage in new hobbies, activities, or create new memories with other friends and family members who are good emotional support to the grieving person. Acceptance does not come easily and may not ever happen for some people. Losing someone important in your life can disrupt brain and biological rhythms. Therefore, grief counseling will help someone process so it does not disrupt your life, but often times acceptance does not occur.

Grief is a complex feeling that each individual will experience differently. The five stages of grief is a great starting point to understanding certain emotions, but are not always experienced in the exact order (denial-acceptance).

In 1999, Joanne Jozefowski summarized five stages to rebuild a shattered life:

- Impact: shock, denial, anxiety, fear, and panic.
- Chaos: confusion, disbelief, actions out of control, irrational thoughts and feelings, feeling despair, feeling helpless, desperate searching, losing track of time, difficulty sleeping and eating, obsessive focus on the loved one and their possessions, agony from imagining their physical harm, shattered beliefs.
- Adapting: bringing order back into daily life while you continue to grieve: take care of basic needs (personal grooming, shopping, cooking, cleaning, paying bills), learn to live without the loved one, accept help, focus on helping children cope, connect with other grieving families for mutual support, take control of grieving so that grief does not control you, slowly accept the new reality.
- Equilibrium: attaining stability and routines: reestablish a life that works alright, enjoy pleasant activities with family members and good times with friends, do productive work, choose a positive new direction in life while honoring the past, learn how to handle people who ask questions about what you've been through.
- Transformation: rethinking your purpose in life and the basis for your identity; looking for meaning in tragic, senseless loss; allowing yourself to have both painful and positive feelings about your loss and become able to choose which feelings you focus on; allowing yourself to discover that your struggle has led you to develop a stronger, better version of yourself than you expected could exist; learning how to talk with others about your heroic healing journey without exposing them to your pain; becoming supportive of others trying to deal with their losses.

== Grief therapy ==
There is a distinction between grief counseling and grief therapy. Counseling involves helping people move through uncomplicated, or normal, grief to health and resolution. Grief therapy involves the use of clinical tools for traumatic or complicated grief reactions. This could occur where the grief reaction is prolonged or manifests itself through some bodily or behavioral symptom, or by a grief response outside the range of cultural or psychiatrically defined normality.

Grief therapy is a kind of psychotherapy used to treat severe or complicated traumatic grief reactions, which are usually brought on by the loss of a close person (by separation or death) or by community disaster. The goal of grief therapy is to identify and solve the psychological and emotional problems which appeared as a consequence.

They may appear as behavioral or physical changes, psychosomatic disturbances, delayed or extreme mourning, conflictual problems or sudden and unexpected mourning. Grief therapy may be available as individual or group therapy. A common area where grief therapy has been extensively applied is with the parents of cancer patients.

=== Controversies ===
==== Efficacy and iatrogenesis ====
At present (as of 2008), a controversy exists in the scholarly literature regarding grief therapy's relative efficacy and the possible harm from it (iatrogenesis). Researchers have suggested that people may resort to receiving grief therapy in the absence of complicated (or abnormal) grief reactions and that, in such cases, grief therapy may cause a normal bereavement response to turn pathological. Others have argued that grief therapy is highly effective for people who suffer from unusually prolonged and complicated responses to bereavement.

In March 2007, an article in the APS journal, Perspectives on Psychological Science, included grief counseling and grief therapy on a list of treatments with the potential to cause harm to clients. In particular, individuals experiencing "relatively normal bereavement reactions" were said to be at risk of a worse outcome (i.e., an abnormally prolonged or difficult grieving process) after receiving grief counseling. The APS journal article in turn has been criticized in the British Psychological Society's publication the psychologist as lacking scientific rigour.

==== Validity of "complicated grief" ====
Some mental health professionals have questioned whether complicated grief exists. New diagnostic criteria for "complicated grief" have been proposed for the new DSM, the DSM-V. One argument against creating a classification for "complicated grief" holds that it is not a unique mental disorder. Rather it is a combination of other mental disorders, such as depression, posttraumatic stress disorder, and personality disorders.

Empirical studies have been attempting to convincingly establish the incremental validity of complicated grief. In 2007, George Bonanno and colleagues published a paper describing a study that supports the incremental validity of complicated grief. The paper cautions, "the question of how complicated grief symptoms might be organized diagnostically is still very much open to debate." As this is a current debate in the field, new research on this topic is likely to appear in the scientific literature.

== Trauma counseling ==
Anticipating the impact of loss or trauma (to the extent than anyone can), and during and after the events of loss or trauma, each person has unique emotional experiences and ways of coping, of grieving and of reacting or not. Sudden, violent or unexpected loss or trauma imposes additional strains on coping. When a community is affected such as by disaster both the cost and sometimes the supports are greater.

Weeping, painful feelings of sadness, anger, shock, guilt, helplessness and outrage are not uncommon. These are particularly challenging times for children who may have had little experience managing strong affects within themselves or in their family. These feelings are all part of a natural healing process that draws on the resilience of the person, family and community.

Time and the comfort and support of understanding loved ones and once strangers who come to their aid, supports people healing in their own time and their own way. Research shows that resilience is ordinary rather than extraordinary but resilience can be a protector from mental distress and depression. The majority of people who survive loss and trauma do not go on to develop PTSD. However, some remain overwhelmed and trapped in their fight-or-flight state.

This article addresses counseling with complex grief and trauma, not only complex post-traumatic stress disorder but those conditions of traumatic loss and psychological trauma that for a number of reasons are enduring or disabling. For example, where an adult is periodically immobilized by unwelcome and intrusive recall of the sudden and violent death of a parent in their childhood.

=== The post-trauma self ===
Because of the interconnectedness of trauma, PTSD, human development, resiliency and the integration of the self, counseling of the complex traumatic aftermath of a violent death in the family, for example, require an integrative approach, using a variety of skills and techniques to best fit the presentation of the problem.

The post-traumatic self may not be the same person as before. Personality changes due to the effects of trauma can be the source of intense shame, secondary shocks after the event and of grief for the lost unaltered self, which impacts on family and work. Counseling in these circumstances is designed to maximize safety, trauma processing, and reintegration regardless of the specific treatment approach. Post-trauma individuals must have space to safely face and process the event. There is no specific treatment approach for each individual, but processing and reintegration must be the focus.

== See also ==
- Kübler-Ross model
- Dual process model of coping
- Grief
- Death education
- Postponement of affect
- Grief therapy dog
- List of counseling topics
