= The Elizabeth Hospice =

Nonprofit hospice in San Diego, US

The Elizabeth Hospice, founded in 1978, is one of the oldest and largest independent hospice, palliative care and grief support providers in San Diego County and Southwest Riverside County, California. As a nonprofit organization, The Elizabeth Hospice has a staff of approximately 300 and has provided medical, emotional and spiritual support to children and adults faced with the challenges associated with a life-threatening illness for over 115,000 people in the communities they serve.

The Elizabeth Hospice is accredited by The Joint Commission, the nation's oldest and largest standards-setting and accrediting body in health care.

The Elizabeth Hospice Children's Bereavement Center opened in 2014 and serves more than 500 children through group sessions, school programs and a summer camp. The Bereavement Center offers a wide range of free services for children, teens and their caregivers which include:

- School-based grief support groups in 20 school districts (Elementary through High School)
- Peer-based grief support groups (ages 3 to 17)
- Camp Spero, a summer grief camp (ages 7 to 17)
