= Grief on the Road to Emmaus =

2023 book by Beth L. Hewett

Grief on the Road to Emmaus: A Monastic Approach to Journeying with the Bereaved
- Cover
- Author: Beth L. Hewett
- Cover artist: Moonjoo Lee
- Language: English
- Subject: Bereavement, grief counseling, Benedictine spirituality
- Publisher: Liturgical Press
- Publication date: March 14, 2023
- Publication place: United States
- Media type: Print, digital
- Pages: 328
- ISBN: 978-0-8146-6804-7

Grief on the Road to Emmaus: A Monastic Approach to Journeying with the Bereaved is a 2023 book by the American bereavement educator Beth L. Hewett, published by Liturgical Press.

The book was written for both everyday people interested in helping the bereaved and professional bereavement facilitators. Its focus is in providing support in faith-based settings, primarily Roman Catholic but also ecumenical, and it is based on eight principles present in the Rule of Saint Benedict: love, mutuality, hospitality, listening, prayer, humility, action, and community. Hewett uses these principles as tools for helping the bereaved while engaging the biblical story of Jesus's grieving followers walking on the road to Emmaus as a map for how to journey with grieving people.

== Summary ==
Hewett describes bereavement support in terms of the “ministry of consolation” from which lay volunteers can deliver bereavement support in conjunction with professionally trained staff. This concept is derived from an episode described in the Gospel of Luke when the risen Jesus joins two disciples as they mourn on the road to Emmaus by walking beside them, witnessing their demeanor, and listening to them until he is in a position to provide them with words of comfort and hope. Hewett, a Benedictine oblate, organizes the contents of this book into eight chapters, with each chapter focused on one of the concepts related to the Rule of Saint Benedict: love, mutuality, hospitality, listening, prayer, humility, action and community. Each chapter begins with some personal example of loss from the author’s family life, maps out what the chapter will include, and then concludes with a summary of what has been covered in that chapter.

In the initial chapter of the book, an overview of the effects of grief on a person’s emotional state, spirituality, cognition, physical being and social life is provided; examples include the work of Rando, Worden, Klass, Kessler, and Wolfelt that are used in this book as a theoretical base with the latter author’s six “mourning needs.” The author emphasizes the difference between grieving and mourning, noting that grieving is internal to an individual, while mourning is social and external in that it involves actions; she provides an image of mourning as a series of spirals that form a process without a past or future. In the following chapters of the book, cultural differences in grieving within Hispanic, African American, Asian and Pacific Islander, and indigenous populations are noted; in addition, Hewett considers boundaries and self-disclosure during interactions in hospital, funeral home, and parish settings, as well as responsive listening skills and the “WAIT” principle. The author also demonstrates through the chapter on prayers how Ps. 130, among others, can be used as a method of listening to God’s voice. Under humility, a brief discussion of how to distinguish between normal grieving behaviors from trauma, depression, addiction, and other mental health problems are offered, as well as criteria for knowing when to refer a bereaved person to a mental health professional; this chapter ends with ethical issues as well as the need for facilitators to develop a personal code of ethics.

The subsequent chapters focus on mourning as action and mourning in community. The author describes how the use of symbols and rituals, such as the eulogy, Roman Catholic Rite of Christian Burial, ceremonies that engage the four elements, and the anniversary remembrance may allow the bereaved to successfully manage their grief. Hewett also offers specific exercises, such as using three memorial stones to symbolize the individual a person is grieving: one stone to represent a beautiful personal trait, one ordinary, and one less attractive. The final chapter describes describing how parishes and other faith-based organizations can implement their own bereavement ministry based on love, as this chapter title expresses.. Although written from a Catholic Christian viewpoint, the author states that other religious and secular practices can be engaged for delivering an effective bereavement ministry, particularly when based on unique cultures and spirituality.

== Reception ==
Louis A. Gamino described the material as "very easy to understand" for those who were not helping professionally; he also found it to be an excellent resource for counsellors and therapists that would like to work with the bereaved using Catholic Spirituality. He commented favorably on the sections that dealt with mutuality, listening, and action; labelled the treatment of rituals and symbols as "extremely motivating"; and commended many of the practical tools (such as the Three Stones Exercise and Mindful Writing Exercise) for dealing with anger and blame, as well. He did, however, caution those practitioners who might not want to look at bereavement from such an unapologetically Catholic perspective. He noted that the focus of the book might be seen by some as "overly narrow or parochial" since it is so deeply rooted in the Benedictine tradition and that it is somewhat long and, at times, repetitive. Gamino suggested that mental health practitioners would probably find the chapter on mental health the least informative despite its usefulness for lay bereavement supporters. Nonetheless, he wrote that it was "a valuable resource" that expanded the toolbox of lay and professional helpers.

Dom Michael Clothier, writing as a fellow Benedictine, called the book "a tremendous blessing at a time when Secular Therapies and many of the Emotional Management Techniques dominate the field." Dom Michael believes that Hewett is "absolutely correct in her recognition of the necessity of being humble" and she places a very high priority on listening, silence, and hospitality of heart; however, regarding the book’s use of both Catholic and more ecumenical approaches, he opposes the mention of Reiki as a type of alternative practice in which he believes Christian workers should not participate. Dom Michael expresses that Hewett's emphasis on the importance of prayer and hope prevents the content of the book from becoming merely "positive" feelings. He writes: "Her application of St. Benedict's wisdom is a great inspiration, and I believe it will benefit many other people as well."

Jane Becker considers Grief on the Road to Emmaus so rich in content that it can be a detailed manual for people who have been intimidated by such a sensitive area in ministry. She appreciates that it offers various guidelines to those who support bereaved persons. Becker also appreciates how truly ecumenical the book is and the fact that it not only invites ministers to be mindful of their fellow Christians, but also recognizes the contribution of Hispanic, Black, Asian, Pacific Islander, and Native American bereaved persons to the field of grieving through their collective knowledge and research. Although Becker notes there are some similarities between certain pieces of advice provided in the text (due to different aspects of the assistance offered requiring a similar attitude) she finds it helpful to have received this from one author. One caution she finds particularly useful that she had not seen elsewhere is that the minister should never become a burden to the bereaved family. Becker concludes that reading this book would help a minister approach of bereavement support the work with more confidence, competence, and a sense of calling.

For Sarah Kye Price, the book is "excellent in construction and easy to read," based upon current grief theories and research and citing figures like Rando, Worden, Kessler, Klass, and Wolfelt. She expresses gratitude that Hewett placed the work of Elisabeth Kübler-Ross where it should be placed, as informative but not designed to be directly applicable to grief work. She believes this clarity about Kübler-Ross's work will help many clergy who may otherwise misuse it. Price also notes that the Roman Catholic theology and liturgy in this book may be readily incorporated into the traditions of Anglican and Episcopal clergy. She emphasizes that this book is a guide for helpers, not a self-help book for people who are newly grieving. Price, a clergy reviewer and a credentialed grief therapist, embraces this book and says she is "anxious to share it with her clergy colleagues and all other faith-based helping professionals."

The highest praise she could give, Susan Quaintance writes, is that "the text is grounded": Hewett's understanding of the Rule and of monasticism is solid, and her approach to humility passes "with flying colors." Drawing on ten years as a hospice volunteer, Quaintance finds the practical advice abundant, the chapters impressively footnoted, and the structure of each—personal story, chapter map, tidy summary—evidence of the author's decades of teaching rhetoric. She cautions that the audience is very specific and that monastery libraries on shoestring budgets might spend their resources on titles with broader readership; even so, she suggests that the book could serve leaders addressing the grief of monastic communities facing decline and completion, with its rituals adapted for those mourning ministries, buildings, and perhaps their own end.

Kim Burkhardt finds the book "both readable and experiential", appreciating that it engages mind and heart alike. She took from it the observation that losses beyond bereavement—a job, a limb, health after an accident—also need to be grieved, writing that without grieving there is no healing and no real moving forward in life. The Benedictine perspective came as a welcome surprise to her as a parishioner of a Saint Benedict parish, and she reports that the instructions on being present with grieving people apply in daily life as well, making it "less transactional, more interactional."

== Other bereavement-focused books by Hewett ==
- Being Human, Being Strong: Foundations of Grief for First Responders. ICISF Press. 2026.
- Duty, Honor, Hope: Strategies for Understanding and Unpacking First Responder Grief. ICISF Press. 2023. Revised 2026.
- Good Words: Memorializing Through a Eulogy. WestBow Press, 2014. Out of print as of 2026
- More Good Words: Practical Activities for Mourning. Updated, WestBow Press, 2014. Originally published by Grief Illustrated Press, 2012. Out of print as of 2026.
- Hewett, Beth L. & Ottenstein, Richard J. Supporting a Grieving Workforce. International Critical Incident Stress Foundation (ICISF) Press, 2021.
