= Dual process model of coping =

Model for coping with grief

The dual process model of coping is a model for coping with grief developed by Margaret Stroebe and Henk Schut. This model seeks to address shortcomings of prior models of coping, and provide a framework that better represents the natural variation in coping experience on a day to day basis.

The authors came up with a dual process model to better represent human grief. They explain that coping with bereavement, a state of loss, can be a combination of accepting loss and confronting life changes that can be experienced simultaneously. This model suggests that healthy coping is done through the oscillation between this acceptance and confrontation. It informs on how the combination of healthy emotional catharsis and changing perspective can be a good and healthy process to cope. Being able to confront the situation, prepared to change, and also deal with everyday life events that confound grieving allows the person to live their lives with desired states of stability in a subjective post-loss world in which bereaved persons find themselves (Parkes, 1993).

== Coping ==
Bereavement and the adjective 'bereaved' are derived from a verb, 'reave', which means "to despoil, rob, or forcibly deprive" according to the Oxford English Dictionary. Thus, a bereaved person is one who has been deprived, robbed, plundered, or stripped of someone or something that they valued. Reaction to this state or impact of loss is called grief. According to Lazarus and Folkman (1984), coping strategies are the "constantly changing cognitive and behavioural efforts to manage specific external and/or internal demands that are appraised as taxing on or exceeding the resources of the person".

People vary in the ways they grieve and in the ways they cope. But acknowledging it and allowing themselves to go through the motions will allow them to cope in a healthy way. To cope with the loss, the person requires to relearn the world around them and simultaneously make a multifaceted transition from loving in presence to loving in absence (Attig, 2001). A healthy relocation of the deceased internally and maintaining a healthy dynamic connectedness/relationship is observed to provide solace to the grieving, but the weightage differed in pluralistic cultural settings. Grievers will go through times of extreme sadness and also times where they are numb to what has happened.

Lack of appropriate coping can bring many ailments to a person, mental and physical. Healthy coping is achieved when the bereaved person is enabled to go forward with healthy, productive living by effortfully developing "new normals" to guide that living which is characterized by lesser stressful demands compared to the initial phase of grief. There are multiple ways to facilitate healthy coping and grieving. For instance, spirituality has been identified as a potential factor that could help facilitate healthy coping strategies and reduce the likelihood of developing complicated grief.

Greenblatt has reviewed spousal mourning as being essential for transition. He describes four phases of mourning: the initial reaction of shock, numbness, denial and disbelief; followed by pining, yearning, depression then in a healthy environment resolution phase begins with emancipation from the loved one and readjustment to the new environment.

In the dual process model, healthy coping can be understood as finding a proper balance between the loss oriented and restoration oriented process, ensuring that an individual has ample time to both acknowledge and process their grief while simultaneously finding distractions and new meaning.

== Dual process model ==
=== Loss oriented ===
The loss-oriented process focuses on coping with bereavement, the loss itself, recognizing it, and accepting it. In this process, a person may express feelings of grief with all the losses that occur from losing their loved one. There will be many changes from work to family and friendships. There might also be demographic changes and even economic ones. Loss-oriented coping has been identified as an essential aspect of early-stage bereavement, and depending on how an individual copes, it can significantly impact future adjustment. It has also been identified that ruminating on feelings of loss might lead to distorted, complicated or prolonged grief.

The loss-oriented process will bring on a lot of yearning, irritability, despair, anxiety, and depression. During this process, they are only concentrated on the pain that this loss has caused. Early lack or denial of adaptive acknowledgment that they will no longer speak to the deceased or see them again might instigate compulsive and self-destructive behaviors. People attached to the deceased have to reconfigure their identity as autonomous beings. These processes in a non-resilient griever can appear overwhelming, and associated guilt can be exported over friends and family in an assumptive effort which might affect interpersonal relationships.

In the context of disaster-related or anticipated losses, such as climate change-related losses, there is evidence that engaging with these emotional experiences to make meaning of them is necessary. Research indicates that without this process of reflecting on emotional experiences, it is not possible to transform them into more adaptive expressions, leading to poor mental health.

=== Restoration oriented ===
In a restoration-oriented process, an individual will tackle issues tangentially related to their loss and will engage in activities that can help distract from grief and facilitate adjustment to a post-loss life. These include focusing on the new roles in their post-loss reality and life responsibilities. The restoration-oriented process incorporates endurance through the reconstruction of perspective by taking over grief; grieving thoughts are adjusted adaptively by creating new meanings with the deceased.

The restoration process is a confrontation process that allows the person to adjust to a world without the deceased. People in this process can feel subjective oscillations of pride and grief-related stressors in the avoidance mentalization. This process allows the person to live their daily life as a changed individual without being consumed by the grieving they are facing. William Worden calls this the "four tasks of grief". Therese A. Rando calls the letting-go process an emancipation from bondage due to the strength required for change and recovery.

Again, in the context of disaster-related losses or anticipated losses due to climate change, reflecting on and making meaning of emotional experiences leads to growth in resilience, psychological flexibility, increased community engagement, and greater solidarity. The emotional processing component of this grief supports the action and restoration that occurs in response to these losses.

=== Oscillation ===
Addressing limitations of other models of grief, such as the five stages of grief, the authors designed the dual process model of coping to help depict a more accurate experience of grief and bereavement in everyday life. This model is based on the idea that individuals will contend with multiple stressors following a significant loss and cannot deal with one isolated issue at a time. Bereaved individuals may even experience gaps and fluctuations in the amount of grief they experience daily.

The role of oscillation in the dual process model is to suggest that grieving individuals will regularly transition between the loss-oriented and restoration-oriented process. Jennifer Fiore, in a 2019 systematic review, describes this process of oscillation as an element of the dual process model of coping that is crucial for an individual to cope with their loss healthily. Oscillation between these two processes allows an individual to address two distinct areas of life post-loss foundational for healthy coping.

While understood to be an essential part of the dual process model, oscillation is also not fully understood by present research. Fiore's 2019 systematic review acknowledged that there is currently no consensus about the optimal balance between loss-oriented and restoration-oriented coping. However, it is generally understood that an individual will prioritize the loss-oriented process early into the grieving process and gradually prioritize the restoration-oriented process more as time progresses.

Oscillation has also been observed to be influenced by cultural and individual characteristics. Different cultural norms and personal preferences may guide individuals to prioritize one type of process over another, making oscillation a dynamic aspect of the dual process model.

== See also ==
- Death anxiety
- Survivor guilt
