= Delayed grief =

Variation of grieving after a loss

The terms delayed grief and unresolved grief are variations of grieving after a loss. The meaning of unresolved grief is any aspect of grieving that has yet to be resolved.

== Overview ==
In cases of delayed grief, the reaction to the loss is postponed until a later time, even years later, and might be triggered by a seemingly unrelated event, such as a recent divorce or even the death of a pet, but with reactions excessive to the current situation.

The delayed grief may manifest as any of the reactions in normal grief: pangs of intense yearning, spasms of distress, short bouts of hysterical laughter, tearful or uncontrolled sobbing, feeling of hopelessness, restlessness, insomnia, preoccupation with thoughts about the loved one, extreme and unexplained anger, or general feelings of depression. In extreme cases, reaction may invoke suicidal tendencies.

The term "delayed grief" is also used to describe a pattern in which symptoms of distress, seeking, yearning (etc.), are occurring at a much later time period than is typical. Delayed grief refers to any reaction that occurs later than usual, as a delayed onset of symptoms. Contrast to the term "complicated grief" as meaning a form of grieving that spans years (see full description at: Grief).

== Examples ==
In a 1987 study, of 135 people with cancer, who were referred for psychological counseling, 76% of them reported a previous grief experience, and 60% of the cancer patients still had unresolved grief from prior losses.

== See also ==
- Anticipatory grief
- Complicated grief disorder
- Disenfranchised grief
- Prolonged grief disorder
- Compounded grief
