= Anticipatory grief =

Feeling of grief before an impending loss

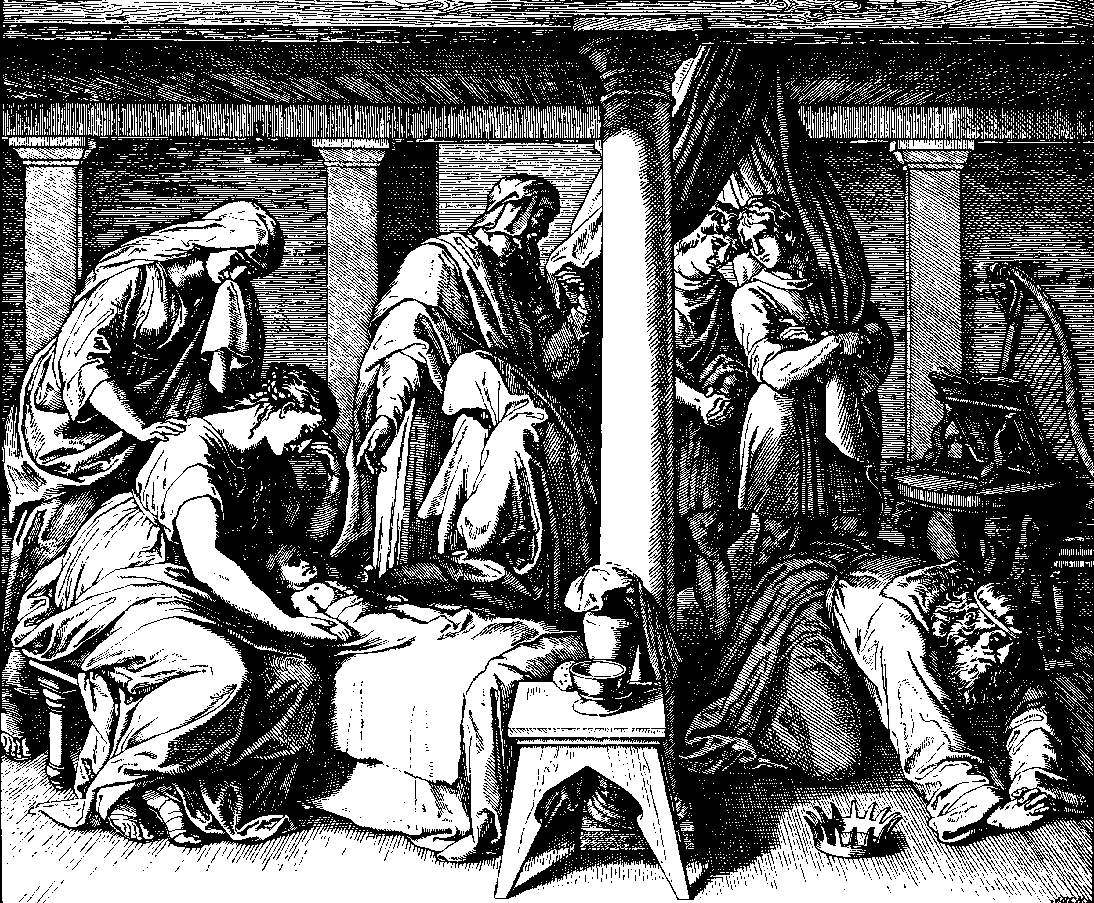
This 1860 woodcut by Julius Schnorr von Karolsfeld depicts David's anticipatory grief after he was warned that his child would die.

Anticipatory grief, also known as preparatory grief, refers to a feeling of grief occurring before an impending loss. Typically, the impending loss is the death of someone close due to illness. This can be experienced by dying individuals themselves and can also be felt due to non-death-related losses like a pending divorce, company downsizing, or war.

Since its introduction in the 1940s, the definition of anticipatory grief has remained contested, and its use in academic research has been marked by some inconsistency. There is also no clear consensus on its psychological impact, with studies reporting both beneficial and adverse effects.

== History ==
Psychiatrist Erich Lindemann introduced anticipatory grief in his analysis of acute grief and grief reactions, studying the prevalent case of anticipatory grief in the wife of a deployed soldier. He found that the wife experienced the impending grief as she expected her husband not to return home alive. She processed the death entirely and adjusted to the idea of a future without her husband. However, many returning soldiers found their wives wanting a divorce as soon as they returned home as a result of fully processed grief.

== Conceptual clarification and terminology ==
Although the term anticipatory grief is widely used to describe emotional responses that occur before the death of a loved one, its definition remains disputed. A systematic review by Singer et al. (2022) identified more than 18 terms -- including anticipatory grief, pre-death grief, caregiver grief and chronic sorrow -- and over 30 distinct definitions for grief prior to death. Fewer than 15 % of the studies they examined adopted definitions proposed by early theorists such as Lindemann or Rando, and these were also applied inconsistently.

Lindemann framed anticipatory grief as a future-oriented reaction to an expected death, in which the mourners rehearse and emotionally prepare for the impending separation. Rando's framework situates anticipatory grief in the present, emphasising grief over ongoing losses during the illness trajectory -- such as changes in the patient's abilities, roles and personality.

Despite their influence, these two conceptualisations account for only a minority of published studies; many papers either omit a definition altogether or conflate several constructs under a single label. Conceptual ambiguity, together with overlapping or poorly specified measurement tools, hampers comparison across studies and has contributed to conflicting evidence about whether anticipatory grief mitigates or worsens post-lost distress.

== Stages and emotional processes ==
The five stages model of grief – denial, anger, bargaining, depression, and acceptance, as proposed by Elisabeth Kübler-Ross – describes the process people undergo after learning of their own diagnosis of terminal illness. Anxiety, dread, guilt, helplessness, hopelessness, and feelings of being overwhelmed are also common. Anger is found to be experienced in anticipatory grief at higher level, as part of the emotional dysregulation, caused by struggles and stress prior loss.

While scholars generally agree grief can be experienced prior to loss, the extent to which it is experienced, as opposed to conventional grief, remains disputed. Early writers such as Blank (1974) suggested that it is possible for one to complete their grieving during a prolonged terminal illness and therefore experience little distress after death. More recent empirical work indicate that pre-loss adjustment rarely substitute for post-lost grief. Researchers note that any 'rehearsal' of bereavement cannot replicate the finality of death, and that continuing hope and caregiving responsibilities keep relatives emotionally invested until the moment of loss. Some scholars have proposed that anticipatory grief can be understood as occurring across three temporal dimensions: grieving for the loss of the past life and the person the individual once was; grieving the present reality of impending death; and grieving the anticipated future without the loved one. In this sense, the grieving process is continuous, and cannot end before the actual loss happen.

Detachment, as part of acceptance to death, is generally understood as the later stages of conventional grief, appears to be more complicated in anticipatory grief. Lindemann's work observed an emotional detachment in the wives, in which affection is gradually redirected away from the husbands. As a result of this, when the husbands came back from the battlefield, their wives showed rejection to intimacy, as a sign of their acceptance and detachment their loved ones. Subsequent studies have produced mixed perspectives: Zisook et al. (2000) suggested the possibility of emotion withdrawal, and caregivers behaving as if the person was already gone, leading to later guilt and complicated grief. Others argue that this cognitive detachment does not necessarily involve emotional withdrawal -- it was observed that wives managed to mentally accept separation without precluding affiliation. It was found that separation was independent from affiliation, making it possible for continued affiliation despite the acceptance of separation.

== Identifying features ==
Features identified specifically with anticipatory grief include heightened concern for the dying person, rehearsal of the death and attempts to adjust to the consequences of the death. The period can allow people to resolve issues with the dying person and to say goodbye. It may provide some sense of orientation and access to the grieving process. For some, it prompts conscious closure before the end/loss.

Symptoms of anticipatory grief for another individual may include changes in appetite and sleep, fatigue, helplessness, anxiety, and fear. Specific mental functions may be compromised, including forgetfulness, compromised attention, and difficulty concentrating and decision-making.

Grief happening prior to a loss presents a compounding issue of isolation because of a lack of social acceptance. Anticipatory grief does not usually take the place of post-loss grief: there is not a fixed amount of grief to be experienced, so grief experienced before the loss does not necessarily reduce grief after the death. However, there may be little grieving after the loss due to anticipatory grief.

How often anticipatory grief occurs is a subject of some controversy. For example, a study of widows found that they stayed with their husbands until the death and could only mourn once the death had occurred. Researchers suggest that to start to grieve as though the loss has already happened can leave the bereaved feeling guilt for partially abandoning the patient.

Many family members can find themselves in a caregiving role during their loved one's process of death. During the progression of the illness, the security and protectiveness of the caregiver also increases. Bouchal, Rallison and Sinclair discuss that, "the strong need to offer protection was part of the anticipatory mourning experience of striving to be with in the present".

In the process of anticipatory grief, family members also begin to prepare and reflect on how their lives will be once their loved one passes. There are many ways in which to perform reflection. These ways include: "...reading, journaling, thinking, and reflecting about how life might be like without their partner." The journal also expands on the premise that the preparation process is not an individual process. Those who are affected by the impending death often look towards one another for support as well as others who are involved in care such as nurses and social workers.

A direct correlation exists between anticipatory grieving and the caregiver's quality of life. In a quantitative study conducted by Al-Gamal and Long, the effect of a pediatric cancer diagnosis on parents had a negative impact on the majority of study participants. More specifically, parents reported experiencing increasing stress and a decrease in physical and mental health – all of which affect the process of anticipatory grief.

Ultimately, anticipatory grieving is an extremely dynamic process that differs between individuals. The outcomes of the grieving process depend on the preparation of death and the anticipatory grief process.

== Impacts of anticipatory grief ==
Studies of the impact of anticipatory grief typically compare the mental and physical well-being of relatives of individuals with prolonged, terminal illness with that of relatives whose loved ones die suddenly or after a brief illness. The underlying premise is that a longer illness trajectory give family members time for emotional and practical preparation, allowing for anticipatory grief to happen.

=== Evidence for a preparatory benefit ===
Two longitudinal studies by Lundin found that widowed spouses bereaved after a prolonged illness exhibited lower levels of psychological distress at one month and at one year post-loss than those bereaved by sudden death. Possible explanations to this phenomenon may be that anticipatory grieving allows families to complete unfinished business, renegotiate roles and make future plans -- activities thought to reduce survivor guilt, a correlate of complicated grief and depression (mood). Other authors describe a similar "role-rehearsal" effect, whereby mourners begin to adapt to life changes before the death occurs, thus mitigating the trauma brought by loss.

=== Evidence for limited or adverse effects ===
In contrast, a study by Clayton et al. reported that widows who had engaged in anticipatory grief were at no advantage twelve months after bereavement, relative to widows bereaved by shorter illness. This finding is consistent with Gerber et al., where poorer medical adjustment was observed among older adults whose partners had endured lengthy illness; longer exposure to the "death watch" correlated with more physician visits, self-reported illness and greater use of psychotropic medication. It is further argued that the stress caused by comparing between the imagined life and the actual life after loss is also a factor to the increased psychological distress as a result of anticipatory grief.

Several investigations also report anger and irritability as a distinct feature of anticipatory grief. In comparative studies, spouses who had cared for a partner through a lengthy illness scored higher on irritability than those bereaved by sudden death. These authors attribute the reaction to the tension between 'letting go' and engaging in caretaking, leading to difficulties in emotional controls. Accompanied by the increased levels of anger, the emotional response tend to be more acute, and atypical to conventional grief.

Taken together, the mixed findings reflect the conceptual and methodological heterogeneity of the field, and illustrate why no consensus yet exists on whether anticipatory grief ultimately mitigates or exacerbates post-loss distress.

== Navigating anticipatory grief ==
Researchers examine therapeutic models that support families and individuals experiencing anticipatory grief. The individual approach centralizes the client's experience outside the family or grieving group by focusing on their needs. During the grieving process, group dynamics include various reactions to the situation, allowing other people’s feelings to mask or comprise one’s own feelings. Individual therapy is beneficial for helping the client understand what they feel outside of the group dynamics and practice coping skills to aid their own journey through grief. Clinical psychologist Therese A. Rando (2000) describes six dimensions of anticipatory mourning: perspective, time focusing, influencing factors, contextual levels, generic operations, and major sources of adaptional demands. The first three determine the experience of grief, and the last three are experiential dimensions.

The family approach observes group dynamics during the grieving process to identify which individuals could most benefit from therapeutic intervention. Kissane, Lichtenthal, and Zaider (2007) constructed the Family-Focused Grief Therapy model to evaluate group functioning and identify the members most affected. This model targets family cohesion, conflict resolution, and communication by optimizing mutual support in grief. It includes 90-minute meetings for 6-10 sessions to understand the group dynamic interactions alongside the individual identity of the patient. Another group model is the Family Systems-Illness model (Rolland, 1990), which highlights family challenges in addressing death by creating a psychosocial map.

Hospice and palliative care workers may experience their own grief while supporting patients, including anticipatory grief. Professionalism may be compromised throughout this process, which calls for self-monitoring and using supervisors and peers for support. The internal process of hospice and palliative care professionals impacts the relationship between themselves, the patient, and the patient’s family. Hospice and palliative care professionals must remain aware of the changing dynamics of grief within the families of dying patients. Tension and conflict may appear but remain hidden while navigating loss, affecting the patient’s experience. Evidence suggests that hospice and palliative care facilities may benefit from further training on anticipatory grief regarding their interpersonal relationships, financial decisions, and other aspects of the grieving process.

== See also ==
- Delayed grief
- Disenfranchised grief
