= George Bonanno =

American psychologist

George A. Bonanno
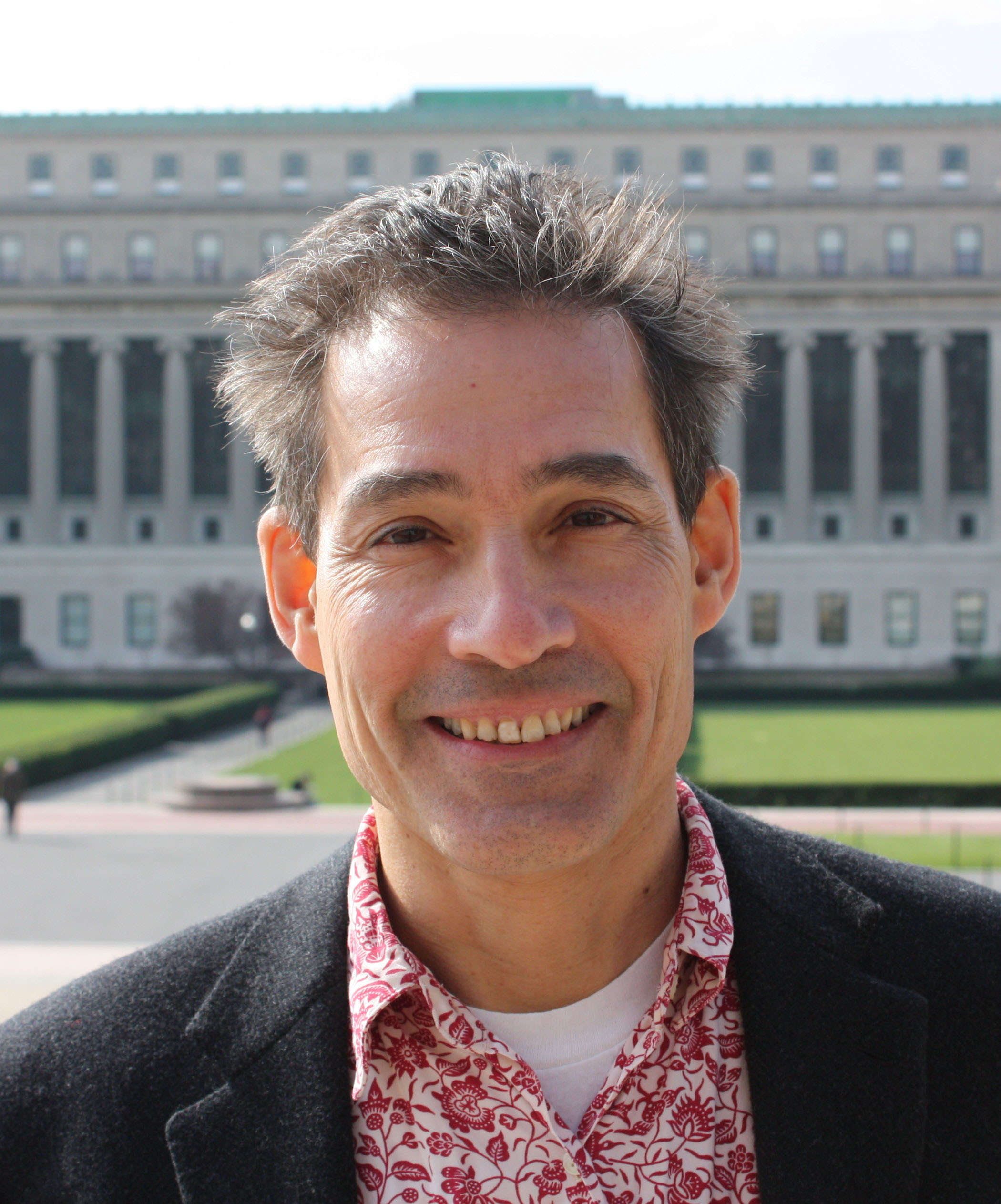
- At Columbia University, May 2010
- Born: Chicago, Illinois, U.S.
- Education: Hampshire College; Yale University
- Known for: Resilience as the experience of human loss and trauma The science of bereavement and trauma The four trajectories of grief Coining the term "coping ugly" The Other Side of Sadness
- Awards: James McKeen Cattell Fellow Award (2019)
- Scientific career
- Fields: Psychology
- Workplaces: Columbia University; Teachers College
- Doctoral advisor: Jerome L. Singer (Yale University)

George A. Bonanno (/bəˈnænoʊ/ bə-NAN-oh) is a professor of clinical psychology at Teachers College, Columbia University, U.S. He introduced the controversial idea of resilience to the study of loss and trauma. He is known for his research in the field of bereavement and trauma. The New York Times on February 15, 2011, stated that the current science of bereavement has been "driven primarily" by Bonanno. Scientific American summarized a main finding of his work, "The ability to rebound remains the norm throughout adult life." Bonanno has been honored with several major awards for his work.

== Work ==
Bonanno introduced the use of prospective research designs based on data before and after a major life event, to the field of bereavement and trauma. In the late 1990s, Bonanno argued that grief could be quantified, measured, and studied in a realist manner.

Bonanno's work argued against popular conceptions of grief, such as Kübler-Ross model of the stages of grief and the idea of grief work based on Freud's ideas.

=== Counseling ===
Bonanno argued that some practices common in grief counseling, trauma counseling, and among therapists after potentially traumatic events can be harmful. These practices include pressuring people to talk about a loss or potential trauma or to participate in therapy after these events regardless of their level of functioning.

=== Coping with loss and stressor events ===
Bonanno argued that genuine laughter and smiling is a healthy response to a loss or stressor event.

Bonanno coined the phrase "coping ugly" to describe the idea that coping with extreme life events takes many forms, some of which seem counter intuitive.

=== Resilience ===
Bonanno argued that resilience, defined as a stable trajectory of mental and physical health, is the most common, natural outcome to loss or trauma.

Bonanno's research found psychological resilience to be at the core of human grief and trauma reactions. Some have found Bonanno's finding of persistent resilience in the face of potentially traumatic events controversial. Other critics have said that the idea that humans are resilient is so obvious that it is simplistic. Others have countered that it may seem simple, but the idea has escaped researchers for the century between Freud's work and Bonanno's. Bonanno has argued that universal counseling after potentially traumatic events does more harm than good. James W. Pennebaker's findings seemingly contradict Bonanno's claims on the harmful effects of retrieving bad experiences.

Bonanno argued that correlates of resilience typically exert such small effects that, paradoxically, it is not possible to accurately predict who will be resilient and who not after a major life stressor.

Bonanno said that means of addressing the resilience paradox include personality scales that capture key correlates and advanced computational methods, such as machine learning algorithms, that capture multiple diverse correlates. However, neither approach solves the paradox. Bonanno suggested that the flexibility mindset and the flexibility sequence, help solve the resilience paradox.

=== Trajectories of grief and trauma reactions ===
In 2002 and 2004, Bonanno described the most common trajectories of grief or potential trauma. This research was based on prospective data collected both prior to the loss or trauma and afterwards. In subsequent studies, Bonanno and colleagues identified the same trajectories following other potentially traumatic events, such as the September 11 terrorist attack in New York, combat deployment, and other events.

Bonanno described common or prototypical trajectories as follows:

Resilience
"The ability of adults in otherwise normal circumstances who are exposed to an isolated and potentially highly disruptive event, such as the death of a close relation or a violent or life-threatening situation, to maintain relatively stable, healthy levels of psychological and physical functioning" as well as "the capacity for generative experiences and positive emotions".
Recovery
When "normal functioning temporarily gives way to threshold or sub-threshold psychopathology (e.g., symptoms of depression or Posttraumatic Stress Disorder (PTSD)), usually for a period of at least several months, and then gradually returns to pre-event levels."
Chronic dysfunction
Prolonged suffering and inability to function, usually lasting several years or longer.
Delayed grief or trauma
When adjustment seems normal but then distress and symptoms increase months later.

=== Flexible self-regulation ===
Bonanno observed that coping and emotion regulation strategies were commonly viewed as being either consistently adaptive or consistently maladaptive. For example, emotional expression is generally thought to be adaptive while the suppression of emotional expression is generally thought to be a maladaptive strategy. In 2004, Bonanno countered this idea by demonstrating that "whether one expresses or suppresses emotional expression is not as important for adjustment as is the ability to flexibly express or suppress emotional expression as demanded by the situational context." Based on this and subsequent research, Bonanno and Charles Burton described that the belief that any single behavior or strategy is consistently adaptive (or maladaptive) an example of the fallacy of uniform efficacy. They also proposed that flexible regulation is not a single behavior or skill but rather consists of several abilities that unfold in sequence, later dubbed the flexibility sequence. The primary steps in the sequence involve (1) context sensitivity, the ability to read cues to the demands and challenges of specific situations; (2) repertoire, having a set of strategies that one is able to use effectively; and (3) feedback monitoring, the ability to monitor and modify a chosen strategy as needed. In addition, Bonanno later proposed that certain personality features foster flexibility by creating a motivational background he called the flexibility mindset.

== Awards ==
- 2025. Elected fellow American Association for the Advancement of Science (AAAS) “For distinguished contributions to our understanding of the psychology of trauma and resilience.”
- 2023. Lifetime achievement award from the International Society for Traumatic Stress studies (ISTSS).
- 2020-2026. Each year since 2020, Bonanno has been ranked among the top 1% of most frequently cited scientists among all science and social-science disciplines worldwide.
- 2019. James McKeen Cattell award from the Association of Psychological Science "for a lifetime of intellectual achievements in applied psychological research and their impact on a critical problem in society at large."
- 2019. International Positive Psychology Association award for "distinguished lifetime contributions to positive psychology."

== Books ==
- Mayne, T., & Bonanno, G. A. (Eds.). (2001). Emotions: Current issues and future directions. Guilford Press.
- Bonanno, G. A. (2009). The other side of sadness: What the new science of bereavement tells us about life after loss. Basic Books.
- Bonanno, G. A. (2021). The end of trauma: How the new science of resilience is changing how we think about PTSD. Basic Books.
