= Five stages of grief =

Concept in psychology

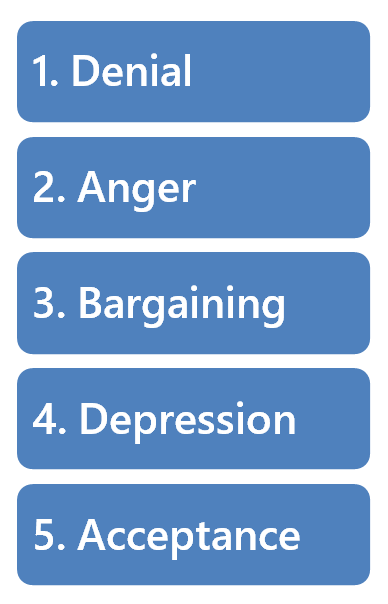
Kübler-Ross 5 stages of grief: denial, anger, bargaining, depression and acceptance.

According to the model of the five stages of grief, or the Kübler-Ross model, those experiencing sudden grief following an abrupt realization (shock) go through five emotions: denial, anger, bargaining, depression, and acceptance. Though widely used, the theory is empirically unsupported.

Introduced as "The Five Stages of Death" by Swiss-American psychiatrist Elisabeth Kübler-Ross in 1969, this model has been known by various names, including "The Five Stages of Loss", "The Kübler-Ross Model", the "Kübler-Ross Grief Cycle", the "Grief Cycle", "The Seven Stages of Grief", and the "Kübler-Ross Change Curve".

== History ==
The model was introduced by Kübler-Ross in her 1969 book On Death and Dying, and was inspired by her work with terminally ill patients. Motivated by the lack of instruction in medical schools on the subject of death and dying, Kübler-Ross examined death and those faced with it at the University of Chicago's medical school. Kübler-Ross's project evolved into a series of seminars which, along with patient interviews and previous research, became the foundation for her book. Although Kübler-Ross is commonly credited with creating stage models, earlier bereavement theorists and clinicians such as Erich Lindemann, Collin Murray Parkes, and John Bowlby used similar models of stages or phases as early as the 1940s. In the foreword to the first 1970 English edition of On Death and Dying, Colin Murray Parkes wrote, "This book describes how some American individuals have coped with death."

In her book, Kübler-Ross states that the medical advancements of the time were the mark of change for the way people perceive and experience death. Due to this, pediatricians have been seeing fewer life-threatening ailments for their patients compared to one hundred years ago.

In her 1974 book Questions and Answers on Death and Dying, Kübler-Ross had by then observed that the stages are not experienced in a strictly linear progression. She noted, "Most of my patients have exhibited two or three stages simultaneously, and these do not always occur in the same order." She later regretted writing them in a way that was misunderstood. "Kübler-Ross originally saw these stages as reflecting how people cope with illness and dying," observed grief researcher Kenneth J. Doka, "not as reflections of how people grieve." In the 1980s, the Five Stages of Grief evolved into the Kübler-Ross Change Curve, which is now widely utilized by companies to navigate and manage organizational change and loss.

As of 2019, On Death and Dying has been translated into forty-one languages, with the 50th anniversary edition published by Simon & Schuster. In December 2019, The American Journal of Bioethics published a special issue (Volume 19, Number 12) dedicated to commemorating the 50th anniversary of its publication.

== Stages of grief ==
A diagram developed by Bertrand Grondin from a presentation of Kübler-Ross' ideas produced by France Telecom

Diagram showing two possible outcomes of grief or a life-changing event

Kübler-Ross originally developed stages to describe the process patients with terminal illness go through as they come to terms with their own deaths; it was later applied to grieving friends and family as well, who seemed to undergo a similar process. The stages, popularly known by the acronym DABDA, include:

1. Denial – The first reaction is denial. In this stage, individuals believe the precipitating event is somehow mistaken, and cling to a false, preferable reality. Some may also isolate themselves, avoiding others who may have accepted what is happening. This stage is usually a temporary defense, so long as the person has adequate time to move amongst the stages as they contemplate death. In her book, Kübler-Ross states that technological advancements have caused people to become fearful of violent, painful deaths; therefore, in order to protect the psychological mind, they deny the reality of their own inevitable death.
2. Anger – When the individual recognizes that denial cannot continue, they become frustrated, especially at proximate individuals. Certain psychological responses of a person undergoing this phase would be: "Why me? It's not fair!"; "How can this happen to me?"; "Who is to blame?"; "Why would this happen?". Some may lash out at loved ones, medical staff, and other family. In Kübler-Ross's other book, Questions and Answers on Death and Dying, she emphasizes the need for people to do their best to let those who are in this stage feel their feelings and try not to take the anger personally.
3. Bargaining – The third stage involves the hope that the individual can avoid a cause of grief. Usually, the negotiation for an extended life is made in exchange for a reformed lifestyle. People facing less serious trauma can bargain or seek compromise. Examples include the terminally ill person who "negotiates with God" to attend a daughter's wedding, an attempt to bargain for more time to live in exchange for a reformed lifestyle or a phrase such as "If I could trade their life for mine".
4. Depression – "I'm so sad, why bother with anything?"; "I'm going to die soon, so what's the point?"; "I miss my loved one; why go on?" During the fourth stage, the individual despairs at the recognition of their mortality. In this state, the individual may become silent, refuse visitors and spend much of the time mournful and sullen.
5. Acceptance – "It's going to be okay."; "I can't fight it; I may as well prepare for it." In this last stage, individuals embrace mortality or inevitable future, or that of a loved one, or other tragic event. People dying may precede the survivors in this state, which typically comes with a calm, retrospective view for the individual, and a stable condition of emotions.

Kübler-Ross identified additional stages of emotional response beyond the five widely recognized stages of grief, illustrated in a full-page graphic on page 251 of the 50th anniversary edition of On Death and Dying. Alongside the well-known stages of denial, anger, bargaining, depression, and acceptance, Kübler-Ross detailed other "stages" such as shock, partial denial, preparatory grief (also known as anticipatory grief), hope, and decathexis, which refers to the process of withdrawing emotional investment from external objects or relationships. She also acknowledged other emotional responses including guilt, anxiety, and numbness.

In Questions and Answers on Death and Dying, Kübler-Ross answered questions after the publication of her first book, On Death and Dying. She emphasized that no patient should be directly told that they are dying and that practitioners should try to wait until the patient asks about death to discuss it. In her book, she also proposes that practitioners listen to the patient first and foremost, and that the patient's right to self-determination should still be practiced.

In a posthumously published book co-authored with David Kessler, Kübler-Ross expanded the model to address a wide range of personal losses, recognizing that it might be more about change than solely about grief. This broader framework encompasses various forms of loss, including the death of a loved one, job or income loss, major rejection, relationship breakups or divorce, drug addiction, the onset of illness or infertility, and even minor setbacks like losing insurance coverage. Kessler has also proposed "Meaning" as a sixth stage of grief. Other authors have also explored and expanded upon stage theories, such as Claire Bidwell Smith in her book Anxiety: The Missing Stage of Grief, which addresses additional aspects of emotional response and adjustment beyond Kübler-Ross's original framework.

In 2020, during the COVID-19 pandemic, Kessler applied the five stages to responses to the virus, saying: "It's not a map but it provides some scaffolding for this unknown world."

There's denial, which we saw a lot of early on: This virus won't affect us. There's anger: You're making me stay home and taking away my activities. There's bargaining: Okay, if I social distance for two weeks everything will be better, right? There's sadness: I don't know when this will end. And finally there's acceptance. This is happening; I have to figure out how to proceed.

Acceptance, as you might imagine, is where the power lies. We find control in acceptance. I can wash my hands. I can keep a safe distance. I can learn how to work virtually.

== Criticism ==
Although widely used, the theory lacks robust empirical support, which limits its scientific validity. While familiarity with its five or six stages can provide a useful basic understanding of how people respond to death and grief, alternative models may offer a more accurate representation of the grieving process.

Robert J. Kastenbaum (1932–2013) who was a recognized expert in gerontology, aging, and death, raised the following points:

- The existence of these stages as such has not been demonstrated.
- No evidence has been presented that people actually do move from Stage 1 through Stage 5.
- The limitations of the method have not been acknowledged.
- The line is blurred between description and prescription.
- The resources, pressures, and characteristics of the immediate environment, which can make a tremendous difference, are not taken into account.

A widely cited 2003 study of bereaved individuals conducted by Maciejewski and colleagues at Yale University obtained some findings consistent with a five-stage hypothesis but others inconsistent with it. Several letters were also published in the same journal criticizing this research and arguing against the stage idea. It was pointed out, for example, that instead of "acceptance" being the final stage of grieving, the data actually showed it was the most frequently endorsed item at the first and every other time point measured; that cultural and geographical bias within the sample population was not controlled for; and that out of the total number of participants originally recruited for the study, nearly 40% were excluded from the analysis who did not fit the stage model. In subsequent work, Prigerson & Maciejewski focused on acceptance (emotional and cognitive) and backed away from stages, writing that their earlier results "might more accurately be described as 'states' of grief."

George Bonanno, Professor of Clinical Psychology at Columbia University, in his book The Other Side of Sadness: What the New Science of Bereavement Tells Us About Life After a Loss, summarizes peer-reviewed research based on thousands of subjects over two decades and concludes that a natural psychological resilience is a principal component of grief and that there are no stages of grief to pass. Bonanno's work has also demonstrated that absence of grief or trauma symptoms is a healthy outcome.

Among social scientists, another criticism is a lack of theoretical underpinning. Because the stages arose from anecdotes and not underlying theoretical principles it contains conceptual confusion. For example, some people criticize that some stages represent emotions while others represent cognitive processes, as if the experience felt must discern one from another. Also, there is no rationale for arbitrary dividing lines between states. On the other hand, there are other theoretically based, scientific perspectives that better represent the course of grief and bereavement such as: trajectories approach, cognitive stress theory, meaning-making approach, psychosocial transition model, two-track model, dual process model, and the task model.

Misapplication can be harmful if it leads bereaved persons to feel that they are not coping appropriately or it can result in ineffective support by members of their social network and/or health care professionals. The stages were originally meant to be descriptive but over time became prescriptive. Some caregivers dealt with clients who were distressed that they did not experience the stages in "the right order" or failed to experience one or more of the stages of grief.

Criticism and lack of support in peer-reviewed research or objective clinical observation by some practitioners in the field has led to the labels of myth and fallacy in the notion that there are stages of grief. Nevertheless, the model's use has persisted in popular news and entertainment media, and some professionals have stated their confidence in the veracity of the model.

Kübler-Ross acknowledged the variability and complexity of individual experiences, using the so-called "stages" of emotional responses as a framework to describe common patterns. She explicitly described these stages as a heuristic device, noting that they are categories artificially isolated for clarity, with the understanding that emotional responses are fluid and overlapping. In her book, Kübler-Ross repeatedly warned that these "stages" can overlap, occur simultaneously, or be missed altogether, and she even placed the term "stages" in inverted commas in the book's diagrammatic representation to emphasize their tentative nature. The principal aim of On Death and Dying was to fundamentally reshape attitudes toward the experiences of dying patients by advocating for a more humane and patient-centered approach in medical practice and beyond, rather than merely defining the experience of dying in "stages".
