= HelloGiggles =

Entertainment and lifestyle website

- Website type: Entertainment and lifestyle
- Available in: English
- Owner: Dotdash Meredith
- Creators: Zooey Deschanel; Sophia Rivka Rossi; Molly McAleer
- Website: hellogiggles.com
- Commercial: Yes
- Registration: Closed
- Launched: May 2011
- Current status: Shut down

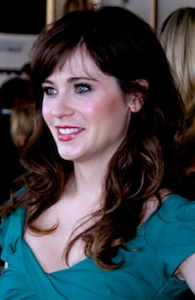
Founder, Zooey Deschanel

HelloGiggles.com was an entertainment and lifestyle website launched in May 2011. It was last updated in 2023 and permanently shut down in August 2025.

It was founded by actress/musician Zooey Deschanel, TV producer Sophia Rivka Rossi and writer Molly McAleer. The website was geared toward women, and covered topics in popular culture, love, friendship, careers, style, food, and daily news.

== Acquisition ==
HelloGiggles was acquired by Time Inc. in 2015. The terms of the deal were not disclosed to the public, but online reports pegged the acquisition price by Time as being around $30 million. A print edition of the online magazine debuted in 2018.

== Reception ==
Mashable said the site warms the internet "up with fun and empowering, lady-friendly content".
