= Terminal illness =

Incurable fatal disease

Terminal illness or end-stage disease is a disease that cannot be cured, or adequately treated, and typically results in the death of the patient. This term is usually used for progressive diseases such as certain cancers, rather than fatal injury. In popular use, it indicates a disease that will progress until death with near absolute certainty, regardless of treatment. A patient who has such an illness is a terminally ill patient. There is no standardized life expectancy for a patient to be considered terminal, although it is generally months or less. An illness which will result in premature death, even if that death may be many years away, is a life-limiting illness. An illness which is lifelong but not life-shortening is a chronic condition.

Terminal patients usually have options for disease management after diagnosis; examples may include caregiving, continued treatment, palliative and hospice care, and physician-assisted suicide. Decisions regarding management are made by the patient and their family, although medical professionals may offer recommendations of services available to terminal patients.

Lifestyle after diagnosis varies depending on management decisions and the nature of the disease, and there may be restrictions depending on the condition of the patient. Terminal patients may experience depression or anxiety associated with impending death, and family and caregivers may struggle with psychological burdens. Psychotherapeutic interventions may alleviate some of these burdens, and is often incorporated into palliative care.

When terminal patients are aware of their impending deaths, they may want to use the time to prepare for care, such as advance directives (like living wills), which have been shown to improve end-of-life care. While death cannot be avoided, patients can strive to die a death seen as good. However, many healthcare providers are uncomfortable telling people or their families that they are dying. To avoid uncomfortable conversations, they will withhold information and evade questions.

== Definition ==
Accurately identifying the start of terminal status is important because it usually occasions a review of treatment goals. Although there is no single official definition, there are four typical characteristics for determining whether a person has a terminal illness:

- The person is expected to die from this illness (i.e., not from old age).
- The illness cannot be cured (or it is medically unlikely) and is expected to get worse.
- The illness has reached an advanced stage.
- The statistically likely remaining lifespan is measured in weeks or months, rather than years or decades. For example, four different US federal laws define the maximum expected lifespan in four different ways: no more than six months, nine months, 12 months, or 24 months.

When the remaining lifespan is expected to be days and the physical process of dying has begun, the term active dying may be used instead.

== Communicating terminal status ==
Most terminally ill people do not experience additional distress from honest prognosis discussions beyond their existing distress from the illness itself, and they usually value knowing whether their realistic lifespan is likely to be "weeks", "months", or "years", even if more specific estimates are unavailable. However, many healthcare providers avoid telling them this because the healthcare providers are uncomfortable with death or perceive it as a professional failure. To avoid admitting that the person will inevitably die from an incurable condition, they may withhold information or, if pressed, give overly optimistic answers. For example, if the typical person in that situation usually lives for two to six months, they may say only the larger number. They may rationalize the inflated claim by thinking of hopeful possibilities, such as an unproven treatment (which might shorten the person's life even further) being attempted, or because they know that life expectancy is an imperfect estimate and could be both shorter or longer than expected.

They may feel pressure from family members to give pleasant news or to preserve the false appearance of hope. They often want to avoid the emotional outbursts that are associated with people understanding the medical situation accurately. For example, they will use death-denying language such as "She has a life-limiting diagnosis" – a term that makes the inevitable death seem less inevitable – rather than bluntly saying "No matter what we do, your daughter is almost certainly going to die from this cancer, probably within the next few months."

== Management ==
By definition, there is not a cure or adequate treatment for terminal illnesses. However, some kinds of medical treatments may be appropriate anyway, such as treatment to reduce pain or ease breathing.

Some terminally ill patients stop all debilitating treatments to reduce unwanted side effects. Others continue aggressive treatment in the hope of an unexpected success. Still others reject conventional medical treatment and pursue unproven treatments such as radical dietary modifications. Patients' choices about different treatments may change over time. People who pursue aggressive treatment usually do not understand that their illness has reached a terminal stage, and they are pursuing treatment because they do not understand it to be futile.

Palliative care is normally offered to terminally ill patients, regardless of their overall disease management style, if it seems likely to help manage symptoms such as pain and improve quality of life. Hospice care, which can be provided at home or in a long-term care facility, additionally provides emotional and spiritual support for the patient and loved ones. Some complementary approaches, such as relaxation therapy, massage, and acupuncture may relieve some symptoms and other causes of suffering.

=== Caregiving ===
Terminal patients often need a caregiver, who could be a nurse, licensed practical nurse or a family member. Caregivers can help patients receive medications to reduce pain and control symptoms of nausea or vomiting. They can also assist the individual with daily living activities and movement. Caregivers provide assistance with food and psychological support and ensure that the individual is comfortable.

The patient's family may have questions and most caregivers can provide information to help ease the mind. Doctors generally do not provide estimates for fear of instilling false hopes or obliterate an individual's hope.

In most cases, the caregiver works along with physicians and follows professional instructions. Caregivers may call the physician or a nurse if the individual:

- experiences excessive pain.
- is in distress or having difficulty breathing.
- has difficulty passing urine or is constipated.
- has fallen and appears hurt.
- is depressed and wants to harm themselves.
- refuses to take prescribed medications, raising ethical concerns best addressed by a person with more extensive formal training.
- or if the caregiver does not know how to handle the situation.

Most caregivers become the patient's listeners and let the individual express fears and concerns without judgment. Caregivers reassure the patient and honor all advance directives. Caregivers respect the individual's need for privacy and usually hold all information confidential.

=== Palliative care ===
Palliative care focuses on addressing patients' needs after disease diagnosis. While palliative care is not disease treatment, it addresses patients' physical needs, such as pain management, offers emotional support, caring for the patient psychologically and spiritually, and helps patients build support systems that can help them get through difficult times. Palliative care can also help patients make decisions and come to understand what they want regarding their treatment goals and quality of life.

Palliative care is an attempt to improve patients' quality-of-life and comfort, and also provide support for family members and carers. Additionally, it lowers hospital admissions costs. However, needs for palliative care are often unmet whether due to lack of government support and also possible stigma associated with palliative care. For these reasons, the World Health Assembly recommends development of palliative care in health care systems.

Palliative care and hospice care are often confused, and they have similar goals. However, hospice care is specifically for terminal patients while palliative care is more general and offered to patients who are not necessarily terminal.

=== Hospice care ===
While hospitals focus on treating the disease, hospices focus on improving patient quality-of-life until death. Hospice patients are able to live at peace away from a hospital setting; they may live at home with a hospice provider or at an inpatient hospice facility.

A common misconception is that hospice care hastens death because patients "give up" fighting the disease. However, people in hospice care often live the same length of time as patients in the hospital, or longer. Additionally, people receiving hospice care have significantly lower healthcare expenditures.

Hospice care allows patients to spend more time with family and friends. People in institutional (rather than home-care) hospice programs are also in the company of other hospice patients, which provides them with an additional support network.

=== Medications for terminal patients ===
Terminal patients experiencing pain, especially cancer-related pain, are often prescribed opioids to relieve suffering. The specific medication prescribed, however, will differ depending on severity of pain and disease status.

There exist inequities in availability of opioids to terminal patients, especially in countries where opioid access is limited.

A common symptom that many terminal patients experience is dyspnea, or difficulty with breathing. To ease this symptom, doctors may also prescribe opioids to patients. Some studies suggest that oral opioids may help with breathlessness. However, due to lack of consistent reliable evidence, it is currently unclear whether they truly work for this purpose.

Depending on the patient's condition, other medications will be prescribed accordingly. For example, if patients develop depression, antidepressants will be prescribed. Anti-inflammation and anti-nausea medications may also be prescribed.

=== Continued treatment ===
Some terminal patients opt to continue extensive treatments in hope of a miracle cure, whether by participating in experimental treatments and clinical trials or seeking more intense treatment for the disease. Rather than to "give up fighting," patients spend thousands more dollars to try to prolong life by a few more months. What these patients often do give up, however, is quality of life at the end of life by undergoing intense and often uncomfortable treatment. A meta-analysis of 34 studies including 11,326 patients from 11 countries found that less than half of all terminal patients correctly understood their disease prognosis, or the course of their disease and likeliness of survival. This could influence patients to pursue unnecessary treatment for the disease due to unrealistic expectations.

=== Transplant ===
For patients with end stage kidney failure, studies have shown that transplants increase the quality of life and decreases mortality in this population. In order to be placed on the organ transplant list, patients are referred and assessed based on criteria that ranges from current comorbidities to potential for organ rejection post transplant. Initial screening measures include: blood tests, pregnancy tests, serologic tests, urinalysis, drug screening, imaging, and physical exams.

For patients who are interested in liver transplantation, patients with acute liver failure have the highest priority over patients with cirrhosis alone. Acute liver failure patients will present with worsening symptoms of somnolence or confusion (hepatic encephalopathy) and thinner blood (increased INR) due to the liver's inability to make clotting factors. Some patients could experience portal hypertension, hemorrhages, and abdominal swelling (ascites). Model for End Stage Liver Disease (MELD) is often used to help providers decide and prioritize candidates for transplant.

=== Physician-assisted suicide ===
Physician-assisted suicide (PAS) is highly controversial, and legal in only a few countries. In PAS, physicians, with voluntary written and verbal consent from the patient, give patients the means to die, usually through lethal drugs. The patient decides on their own time and place to die. Reasons as to why patients choose PAS differ. Factors that may play into a patient's decision include future disability and suffering, lack of control over death, impact on family, healthcare costs, insurance coverage, personal beliefs, religious beliefs, and much more.

PAS may be referred to in many different ways, such as aid in dying, assisted dying, death with dignity, and many more. These often depend on the organization and the stance they take on the issue. In this section of the article, it will be referred to as PAS for the sake of consistency with the pre-existing Wikipedia page: Assisted Suicide.

In the United States, PAS or medical aid in dying is legal in select states, including Oregon, Washington, Montana, Vermont, and New Mexico, and there are groups both in favor of and against legalization.

Some groups favor PAS because they do not believe they will have control over their pain, because they believe they will be a burden on their family, and because they do not want to lose autonomy and control over their own lives among other reasons. They believe that allowing PAS is an act of compassion.

While some groups believe in personal choice over death, others raise concerns regarding insurance policies and potential for abuse. According to Sulmasy et al., the major non-religious arguments against physician-assisted suicide are quoted as follows:

- (1) "it offends me", suicide devalues human life;
- (2) slippery slope, the limits on euthanasia gradually erode;
- (3) "pain can be alleviated", palliative care and modern therapeutics more and more adequately manage pain;
- (4) physician integrity and patient trust, participating in suicide violates the integrity of the physician and undermines the trust patients place in physicians to heal and not to harm"

Again, there are also arguments that there are enough protections in the law that the slippery slope is avoided. For example, the Death with Dignity Act in Oregon includes waiting periods, multiple requests for lethal drugs, a psychiatric evaluation in the case of possible depression influencing decisions, and the patient personally swallowing the pills to ensure voluntary decision.

Physicians and medical professionals also have disagreeing views on PAS. Some groups, such as the American College of Physicians (ACP), the American Medical Association (AMA), the World Health Organization, American Nurses Association, Hospice Nurses Association, American Psychiatric Association, and more have issued position statements against its legalization.

The ACP's argument concerns the nature of the doctor-patient relationship and the tenets of the medical profession. They state that instead of using PAS to control death: "through high-quality care, effective communication, compassionate support, and the right resources, physicians can help patients control many aspects of how they live out life's last chapter."

Other groups such as the American Medical Students Association, the American Public Health Association, the American Medical Women's Association, and more support PAS as an act of compassion for the suffering patient.

In many cases, the argument on PAS is also tied to proper palliative care. The International Association for Hospice and Palliative Care issued a position statement arguing against considering legalizing PAS unless comprehensive palliative care systems in the country were in place. It could be argued that with proper palliative care, the patient would experience fewer intolerable symptoms, physical or emotional, and would not choose death over these symptoms. Palliative care would also ensure that patients receive proper information about their disease prognosis as not to make decisions about PAS without complete and careful consideration.

== Refusal of nutrition and hydration ==
People who feel they are near the end of their life often refuse food or water. Published studies indicate that "within the context of adequate palliative care, the refusal of food and fluids does not contribute to suffering among the terminally ill", and might actually contribute to a comfortable passage from life: "At least for some persons, starvation does correlate with reported euphoria."

== Medical care ==
Many aspects of medical care are different for terminal patients compared to patients in the hospital for other reasons.

=== Doctor–patient relationships ===
Doctor–patient relationships are crucial in any medical setting, and especially so for terminal patients. There must be an inherent trust in the doctor to provide the best possible care for the patient. In the case of terminal illness, there is often ambiguity in communication with the patient about their condition. While terminal condition prognosis is often a grave matter, doctors do not wish to quash all hope, for it could unnecessarily harm the patient's mental state and have unintended consequences. However, being overly optimistic about outcomes can leave patients and families devastated when negative results arise, as is often the case with terminal illness.

=== Mortality predictions ===
Often, a patient is considered terminally ill when their estimated life expectancy is six months or less, under the assumption that the disease will run its normal course based on previous data from other patients. The six-month standard is arbitrary, and best available estimates of longevity may be incorrect. Though a given patient may properly be considered terminal, this is not a guarantee that the patient will die within six months. Similarly, a patient with a slowly progressing disease, such as AIDS, may not be considered terminally ill if the best estimate of longevity is greater than six months. However, this does not guarantee that the patient will not die unexpectedly early.

In general, physicians slightly overestimate the survival time of terminally ill cancer patients, so that, for example, a person who is expected to live for about six weeks would likely die around four weeks.

A recent systematic review on palliative patients in general, rather than specifically cancer patients, states the following: "Accuracy of categorical estimates in this systematic review ranged from 23% up to 78% and continuous estimates over-predicted actual survival by, potentially, a factor of two." There was no evidence that any specific type of clinician was better at making these predictions.

=== Healthcare spending ===
Healthcare during the last year of life is costly, especially for patients who used hospital services often during end-of-life.

In fact, according to Langton et al., there were "exponential increases in service use and costs as death approached."

Many dying terminal patients are also brought to the emergency department (ED) at the end of life when treatment is no longer beneficial, raising costs and using limited space in the ED.

While there are often claims about "disproportionate" spending of money and resources on end-of-life patients, data have not proven this type of correlation.

The cost of healthcare for end-of-life patients is 13% of annual healthcare spending in the U.S. However, of the group of patients with the highest healthcare spending, end-of-life patients only made up 11% of these people, meaning the most expensive spending is not made up mostly of terminal patients.

Many recent studies have shown that palliative care and hospice options as an alternative are much less expensive for end-of-life patients.

== Psychological impact ==
Coping with impending death is a hard topic to digest universally. Patients may experience grief, fear, loneliness, depression, and anxiety among many other possible responses. Terminal illness can also lend patients to become more prone to psychological illness such as depression and anxiety disorders. Insomnia is a common symptom of these.

People who are terminally ill may not always come to accept their impending death. For example, a person who finds strength in denial may never reach a point of acceptance or accommodation and may react negatively to any statement that threatens this defense mechanism.

=== Impact on patient ===
Depression is relatively common among terminal patients, and the prevalence increases as patients become sicker. Depression causes quality of life to go down, and a sizable portion of patients who request assisted suicide are depressed. These negative emotions may be heightened by lack of sleep and pain as well. Depression can be treated with antidepressants, therapy, or both, but doctors often do not realize the extent of terminal patients' depression.

Because depression is common among terminal patients, the American College of Physicians recommends regular assessments for depression for this population and appropriate prescription of antidepressants.

Anxiety disorders are also relatively common for terminal patients as they face their mortality. Patients may feel distressed when thinking about what the future may hold, especially when considering the future of their families as well. Some palliative medications may facilitate anxiety.

=== Coping for patients ===
Caregivers may listen to the concerns of terminal patients to help them reflect on their emotions. Different forms of psychotherapy and psychosocial intervention, which can be offered with palliative care, may also help patients think about and overcome their feelings. According to Block, "most terminally ill patients benefit from an approach that combines emotional support, flexibility, appreciation of the patient's strengths, a warm and genuine relationship with the therapist, elements of life-review, and exploration of fears and concerns."

=== Impact on family ===
Terminal patients' families often also suffer psychological consequences. If not well equipped to face the reality of their loved one's illness, family members may develop depressive symptoms and even have increased mortality. Taking care of sick family members may also cause stress, grief, and worry. Additionally, financial burden from medical treatment may be a source of stress. Parents of terminally ill children also face additional challenges in addition to mental health stressors including difficulty balancing caregiving and maintaining employment. Many report feeling as if they have to "do it all" by balancing caring for their chronically ill child, limiting absence from work, and supporting their family members. Children of terminally ill parents often experience a role reversal in which they become the caretakers of their adult parents. In taking on the burden of caring for their sick parent and assuming the responsibilities they can no longer accomplish, many children also experience significant declines in academic performance.

=== Coping for family ===
Discussing the anticipated loss and planning for the future may help family members accept and prepare for the patient's death. Interventions may also be offered for anticipatory grief. In the case of more serious consequences such as depression, a more serious intervention or therapy is recommended. Upon the death of someone who is terminally ill, many family members that served as caregivers are likely to experience declines in their mental health. Grief counseling and grief therapy may also be recommended for family members after a loved one's death.

== Death ==
When dying, patients often worry about their quality of life towards the end, including emotional and physical suffering.

In order for families and doctors to understand clearly what the patient wants for themselves, it is recommended that patients, doctors, and families all convene and discuss the patient's decisions before the patient becomes unable to decide.

=== Advance directives ===
At the end of life, especially when patients are unable to make decisions on their own regarding treatment, it is often up to family members and doctors to decide what they believe the patients would have wanted regarding their deaths, which is often a heavy burden and hard for family members to predict. An estimated 25% of American adults have an advance directive, meaning the majority of Americans leave these decisions to be made by family, which can lead to conflict and guilt. Although it may be a difficult subject to broach, it is important to discuss the patient's plans for how far to continue treatment should they become unable to decide. This must be done while the patient is still able to make the decisions, and takes the form of an advance directive. The advance directive should be updated regularly as the patient's condition changes so as to reflect the patient's wishes.

Some of the decisions that advance directives may address include receiving fluids and nutrition support, getting blood transfusions, receiving antibiotics, resuscitation (if the heart stops beating), and intubation (if the patient stops breathing).

Having an advance directive can improve end-of-life care.

It is highly recommended by many research studies and meta-analyses for patients to discuss and create an advance directive with their doctors and families.

=== Do-not-resuscitate ===
One of the options of care that patients may discuss with their families and medical providers is the do-not-resuscitate (DNR) order. This means that if the patient's heart stops, CPR and other methods to bring back heartbeat would not be performed. This is the patient's choice to make and can depend on a variety of reasons, whether based on personal beliefs or medical concerns. DNR orders can be medically and legally binding depending on the applicable jurisdiction.

Decisions like these should be indicated in the advance directive so that the patient's wishes can be carried out to improve end-of-life care.

=== Symptoms near death ===
A variety of symptoms become more apparent when a patient is nearing death. Recognizing these symptoms and knowing what will come may help family members prepare.

During the final few weeks, symptoms will vary largely depending on the patient's disease. During the final hours, patients usually will reject food and water and will also sleep more, choosing not to interact with those around them. Their bodies may behave more irregularly, with changes in breathing, sometimes with longer pauses between breaths, irregular heart rate, low blood pressure, and coldness in the extremities. Symptoms will vary per patient.

=== Good death ===
Patients, healthcare workers, and recently bereaved family members often describe a "good death" in terms of effective choices made in a few areas:

- Assurance of effective pain and symptom management.
- Education about death and its aftermath, especially as it relates to decision-making.
- Completion of any significant goals, such as resolving past conflicts.

In the last hours of life, palliative sedation may be recommended by a doctor or requested by the patient to ease the symptoms of death until they die. Palliative sedation is not intended to prolong life or hasten death; it is merely meant to relieve symptoms.

== See also ==
- Advance healthcare directive
- Anticipatory grief
- Do not resuscitate
- End-of-life care
- Euthanasia
- Futile medical care
- Hospice care in the United States
- Interventionism (medicine)
- Palliative care
- Assisted suicide
