= Prolonged grief disorder =

Mental disorder

- Other names: Complicated grief, traumatic grief, persistent complex bereavement disorder
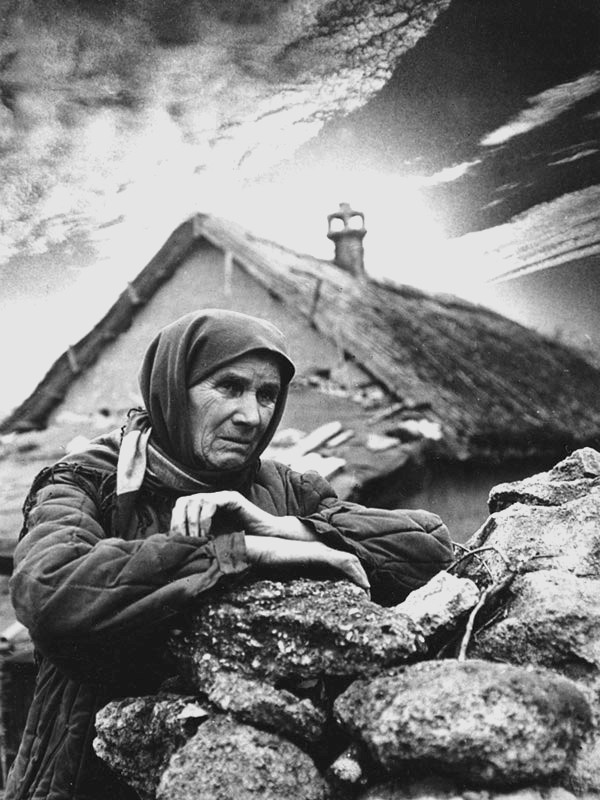
- Specialty: Psychiatry
- Symptoms: Prolonged grief, depression, emotional pain, emotional numbness, loneliness, identity disturbance, difficulty in managing interpersonal relationships
- Complications: Suicide, self harm, relationship damage
- Differential diagnosis: Borderline personality disorder, post-traumatic stress disorder, major depressive disorder, grief not otherwise specified

Prolonged grief disorder (PGD), also known as complicated grief, traumatic grief, and persistent complex bereavement disorder, is a mental disorder consisting of a distinct set of symptoms following the death of a family member or close friend (i.e., bereavement). While grief is a natural and normal response to painful or traumatic events or losses, people with PGD are preoccupied by grief and feelings of loss to the point of clinically significant distress and impairment, which can manifest in a variety of symptoms including depression, emotional pain, emotional numbness, loneliness, identity disturbance and difficulty in managing interpersonal relationships. Difficulty accepting the loss is also common, which can present as rumination about the death, a strong desire for reunion with the departed, or disbelief that the death occurred. PGD is estimated to be experienced by about 10 percent of bereaved survivors, although rates vary substantially depending on populations sampled and definitions used.

In March 2022, PGD was added as a mental disorder in the Diagnostic and Statistical Manual of Mental Disorders, Fifth Edition, Text Revision (DSM-5-TR). PGD is also in the eleventh revision of the International Classification of Diseases (ICD-11). To meet diagnosis, symptoms must occur frequently (usually at least daily) and be present for at least 6–12 months.

== Signs and symptoms ==
PGD behavioral symptoms include:

- Elevated rates of suicidal ideation and attempts
- Functional impairment
- High treatment-seeking behaviors
- Adverse health behaviors

PGD is also a risk factor for a variety of somatic symptoms possibly including:

- Reduced quality of life in adults and in children
- Cancer
- Immunological dysfunction
- Hypertension
- Cardiac events

The individual's relationship to the deceased accounts for a large amount of variance in symptoms. Spouses, parents, and children of deceased tend to display highest severities, followed by siblings, in-laws, and friends. Subjective closeness to deceased has also been found to be an important predictor of pathologic grief responses. Bereaved persons often feel a need to understand why their loved one died by suicide, particularly if a message was not left behind by the deceased.

Grief is a common response to bereavement, occurring in a variety of severities and durations; however, only a minority of cases of grief meet the severity and duration criteria to merit diagnosis of PGD; it is considered when an individual's ability to function and level of distress over the loss is extreme and persistent. People with PGD can experience a chronic aching and yearning for the dear departed, feel that they are not the same person anymore (identity disturbance), become emotionally disconnected from others, or lack the desire to "move on" (in some cases feeling that doing so would be betraying the person who is now deceased). Although normal grief remains with the bereaved person far into the future, its ability to disrupt the survivor's life is believed to dissipate with time.

Since the 1990s, studies have demonstrated the validity of distinguishing PGD from mental disorders with similar symptom clusters, specifically major depressive disorder and post-traumatic stress disorder. Validity has also been demonstrated for the DSM-5-TR criteria.

== Diagnosis ==
Both DSM-5-TR or the ICD-11 are manuals that describe the diagnostic criteria for prolonged grief disorder. As early as 2009, diagnostic criteria for PGD were proposed and later revised. However, Section II – which contains officially recognized diagnoses – of the DSM-5 (2013) did not include PGD; it was only added later in the DSM-5-TR (2022). The DSM-5 however includes persistent complex bereavement disorder as a proposed diagnosis in Section III. The ICD-11 was published in 2022 and also included PGD. Compared to the DSM-5-TR criteria, the ICD-11 allows for a shorter duration of grief responses in adults before diagnosing prolonged grief disorder.

=== DSM-5-TR ===
Prolonged grief disorder in the DSM-5-TR is classified as a "trauma and stressor-related disorder". The diagnosis is given when someone experiences intense and persistent grief following the death of a close person. Key symptoms include intense longing or preoccupation with the deceased, along with additional signs such as disturbances in the sense of identity, difficulty accepting the death, intense emotional pain or numbness, feeling very lonely, and finding that life is meaningless. The symptoms must cause significant distress or impairment, exceed cultural expectations for grief, and not be better explained by another mental or medical condition.

According to psychologist Holly Prigerson, an editor on the trauma and stressor-related disorder section of the DSM-5-TR, strong and ongoing longing for the deceased is a key symptom of prolonged grief, but it is not a feature of depression or any other disorder in the DSM.

=== ICD-11 ===
Prolonged grief disorder in the ICD-11 is diagnosed when a person experiences ongoing and intense grief after the death of someone close. Core symptoms include strong longing or preoccupation with the deceased, combined with emotional pain such as sadness, guilt, anger, or numbness. The grief must last longer than culturally expected and cause significant disruption to daily life. Additional signs include difficulty coping without the deceased, problems recalling positive memories, social withdrawal, and increased substance use or suicidal thoughts. The diagnosis should reflect the individual's cultural norms and not be confused with normal bereavement or other mental health conditions like depression or PTSD. Children and older adults may show grief differently depending on developmental stages.

=== Assessment tools ===
Multiple assessment tools specifically for grief related to bereavement have been developed. The Brief Grief Questionnaire, the 13-item Prolonged Grief-13-R and the 19 item Inventory for Prolonged Grief are screening tools which may suggest the presence of a prolonged grief disorder, with further interview and grief history inventory required to establish a diagnosis. The Inventory of Complicated Grief (developed in 1995) is validated to assess grief symptoms and remains widely used today. According to a 2020 systematic review, there were eleven assessment tools, three of which are designed for clinical interviews. The Traumatic Grief Inventory Self-Report was the only assessment tool found to have empirical evidence supporting use as a diagnostic tool.

== Causes ==
No specific causes guarantee onset of PGD. Known risk factors include one-time incidents along with chronic conditions and neurological abnormalities. One-time incidents include:

- The death was due to a violent method, such as homicide or suicide
- The death occurred in a hospital
- Miscarriage
- Lack of preparation for death, or high levels of anticipatory grief

Long-term predictors include:

- Childhood separation anxiety
- Controlling parents
- Parental abuse or death (other than that of the bereaved death)
- Close kinship relationship to the deceased (e.g., parents)
- Insecure attachment styles
- Emotional dependency
- Emotional closeness to the deceased before death

PGD may be associated with activation of the nucleus accumbens.

These risk factors and clinical correlates have been largely shown to relate to PGD symptoms and not symptoms of major depressive disorder, post-traumatic stress disorder, and generalized anxiety disorder.

== Management ==
Treatment is strongly recommended for prolonged grief disorder. The first line treatment is Grief Focused Psychotherapy. Specifically, Prolonged Grief Therapy has the best evidence of effectiveness. Other cognitive-behavioural therapies have also been developed and shown effectiveness in reducing symptoms of PGD, PTSD and depressive symptoms in bereaved suffering from PGD. Antidepressants may be combined with grief focused therapy when one is having symptoms of concomitant depression, including co-existing major depression. However, medications as a sole therapy for grief related symptoms has not been shown to be helpful and is not recommended.

A combination of relational and cognitive-behavioral interventions have shown evidence for efficacy when treating individuals who have lost loved ones to suicide. Exposure therapy has mixed evidence and in some cases intensifies symptoms, suggesting effectiveness does not vary significantly compared to non-exposure therapies especially with comorbid PTSD. Group therapy has mixed evidence, and has been shown to be less helpful when compared to other treatments.

=== Treating PGD in cancer caregivers and the family ===
Due to the high prevalence of PGD in cancer caregivers who have lost a loved one, interventions have been targeted at this group to assess treatment management. Recent research has investigated bereavement care as a preventative method to improve grief outcomes and reduce grief disorders in familial cancer caregivers. Bereavement care involves providing support for the family at an initial cancer diagnosis, implementing palliative care early on in the disease trajectory. Bereavement care can include individual counseling services, peer support groups, and group programs led by clinicians working in the psychosocial sphere. There are multiple goals of bereavement support, which includes helping those in the grieving process adapt to the loss and helping them maintain and memorialize a connection to the deceased. Interventions focused on bereavement support, needs to address strategies for the individual to re-engage in social activities, as the act of caregiving may have reduced their social network and may point to caregivers needing additional assistance in building a new life post-loss. Other research has looked at religious practices as a coping method in treating PGD. A 2005 study found that bereaved adult cancer care givers, who engaged in spiritual/religious practices as a means of coping, had decreased physical healthcare visits at baseline assessment. However, this was not associated with one's health status at the 4 month follow up assessment. Research has shown that determining especially at risk family caregivers prior to the relative's death, by looking at the demographic characteristics linked to PGD, has assisted interventions in preventing abnormal grief symptoms up to 12 months post-loss. Evidence for complicated grief treatments suggest that treatment management based on cognitive-behavioral frameworks seem to be effective, which have included web based therapist interventions to reduce PGD. Specifically, cognitive behavioral therapy (CBT) appears to be another effective intervention for PGD. Research has shown that CBT is more successful than supportive counseling in reducing PGD symptoms. Additionally, a 2005 study developed Complicated Grief Treatment (CGT), which integrates psychoeducation with CBT techniques. The study demonstrated that individuals receiving CGT experienced greater and faster symptom reduction compared to those undergoing interpersonal therapy (IPT).

=== Treating PGD in younger members in the cancer caregiving family ===
In regards to young family members experiencing severe grief by losing a parent to cancer, research has been conducted on support groups for those bereaved individuals (aged 16–28 years). Support groups have been shown to help improve global well being in those who lost a patient to cancer and in improving life satisfaction. Interventions that target bereaved adolescent and young adult siblings can help them cope with their psychosocial needs, as research shows that more than half of bereaved siblings have displayed high levels of avoidance in addressing their grief following a sibling's death. A 2010 study, assessed the needs of bereaved young adult Australians (12–25 years), who had a sibling or parent pass from cancer, and identified social support and coping skills as unmet needs. In a 2019 systematic review, two camping retreats conducted by hospital faculty and volunteers aimed to provide a space where bereaved siblings, who lost a sibling to cancer, could relax and simultaneously connect with each other's experiences of grief. Other research has investigated interventions that target the remaining surviving parent and the child who lost a member to cancer. A 2005 intervention, called "The Parent Guidance Program," included six therapy sessions for families with children from ages 7–17 years. The program included six therapy sessions during the cancer patient's terminal phase and six sessions after the death of the patient, including family meetings. The main aim of this intervention was to help the child's adjustment to the loss of the parent with a cancer diagnosis by aiming to increase the surviving parent's competency in providing support for the children. This 2005 intervention displayed a small effect size in improving children's anxiety levels.

== Epidemiology ==
According to a 2017 meta-analysis, prevalence of prolonged grief is estimated to be 9.8%, although higher prevalence estimates, as high as 49%, are possible if the death was not due to natural causes. PGD is also more prevalent when the death is by a violent method such as homicide or suicide, with an estimated 70% of those with PGD in the study having been exposed to bereavement by a violent method. Conversely, PGD is less common in cases where the bereaved death was due to natural disasters. PGD has higher prevalence in women. There is a high comorbidity rate with somatic symptom disorders, depression, anxiety and post-traumatic stress disorder, with PGS being observed as heterogenous.

=== PGD prevalence among bereaved cancer caregivers ===
Losing a loved one to cancer can cause intense feelings of grief, as family members typically take on a caregiver role. Caregivers experience caregiver burden, due to the multifaceted role of caregiving, which can influence the level of grief experienced. Caregivers are often tasked with substantial unpaid care duties with many caregivers reporting feeling undertrained to provide extensive care. Stress that results from family caregivers of cancer patients have been shown to have negative impacts on psychological health, as poor psychological adjustments can lead to numerous mental health disorders. These disorders reported include anxiety and depression, as well as complicated grief or prolonged grief disorder. Sociodemographic and psychological factors have been linked to poorer psychological adjustment in bereaved family caregivers of cancer patients, which include a close bond to the deceased loved one, lack of social support, caregiver burden, feeling unprepared for the death of the relative, being of older age, and identifying as a woman. A 2021 meta-analysis identified a global prevalence of 14.2% in prolonged grief disorders among bereaved families dealing with cancer-related deaths. In this same meta-analysis, females exhibited increased grief disorders when compared to males. Families that were experiencing a loved one with neurological cancers also exhibited an increased number of prolonged grief disorder in comparison to other various cancer types. In a 2020 review article, research suggested that bereaved family caregivers of patient's with brain tumors, reported feeling underprepared to assist in end-of-life care and regretted not seeking hospice care earlier. Research has also been assessed in familial caregivers who have experienced a loss of a loved one due to High-Grade Glioma, which has indicated that many experience extreme grief and report unmet needs in regards to their role as a caregiver. Studies have assessed pre-loss grief as a factor in post-loss adjustment, suggesting that preparedness for death in caregivers may be a protective factor in post-loss adjustment. Pre-loss grief, refers to grief experienced before the loss of the patient, and has been associated with increased levels of PGD and increased depressive symptoms post-loss. A 2024 systematic review found that Taiwanese family members who were involved in mostly cancer caregiving, could be at risk for PGD if they felt ill-prepared for the relative's death. Two review articles based in Europe, indicated that abnormal grief could be linked to decreased levels of preparedness for a family member's death.

=== Cultural differences in prevalence rates ===
There exists conflicting evidence on whether PGD is more or less common in eastern countries compared to western countries. Different criteria sets in assessing PGD have made it difficult to compare Asian countries and Global North prevalence rates in grief disorders. However, according to a meta-analysis conducted in 2024, which pooled prevalence rates among five studies from China and Japan, the prevalence rate of prolonged grief disorder was found to be 8.9%. This meta-analysis suggests that cultural practices regarding death in eastern countries may provide evidence for decreased PGD prevalence compared to western countries. Expressions of grief and symptoms of prolonged grief disorder have been shown to vary across cultures in some studies. In one cross-cultural comparison, Chinese bereaved parents reported increased views of feeling that life was "empty" in comparison to the sample of Swiss bereaved parents, with Swiss parents showing increased levels of grief-related preoccupation. Bereavement in Chinese individuals has also been reported to involve more somatic stress responses, as expression of grief can be influenced by varying cultures and cultural rituals. Grief hallucinations and trauma-related distress are often reported among those with PGD in Chinese individuals but are less prevalent and commonplace in the Global North. In a 2024 systematic review that analyzed Taiwanese Families experiencing bereavement, which mostly included families of cancer patients, religion was observed as a protective factor in bereavement, as cultural and religious beliefs are held in terms of reuniting with their loved ones after death. Some cultures participate in religious mourning rituals, which has been researched as a preventative method in developing PGD.

== History ==
The DSM-IV and ICD-10 do not distinguish between normal and prolonged grief. Based on numerous findings of maladaptive effects of prolonged grief, diagnostic criteria for PGD have been proposed for inclusion in the DSM-5 and ICD-11. In 2018, the WHO included PGD in the ICD-11, and in March 2022 the American Psychiatric Association added PGD in the DSM-5-TR.

The proposed diagnostic criteria were the result of statistical analysis of a set of criteria agreed upon by a panel of experts. The analyses produced criteria that were the most accurate markers of bereaved individuals with painful, persistent, destructive PGD. The criteria for PGD have been validated and dozens of studies both internationally and domestically are being conducted, and published, that validate the PGD criteria in other cultures, kinship relationships to the deceased and causes of death (e.g. earthquakes, tsunami, war, genocide, fires, bombings, palliative and acute care settings).

Traumatic grief or complicated grief was a term initially used to identify a complex syndrome in which an individual experiences a unique distress resulting from the simultaneous occurrence of psychological trauma and the loss of a loved one. PTSD and PGD, while being separate diagnoses, do have overlap, as both include similar symptoms of intrusive thoughts relating to death, experiencing numbness to emotions, and possible disturbances in sleep. The central components of complicated grief originally included yearning, separation distress, and inability to acknowledge the loss.

=== Controversy ===
Although evidence suggesting the validity of PGD has existed since 1995, its inclusion into the DSM-5-TR and ICD-11 was slow, including many rejections of earlier proposals for inclusion as a diagnosis.

Recognizing prolonged grief as a disorder was argued to allow it to be better understood, detected, studied and treated. The idea that PGD was a distinct disorder that showed persistency in terms of symptoms was also understood as a primary argument. This argument also underscored the urgent evidence that PGD has been associated with increased rates of other mental disorders, including PTSD, suicidality, and depression. However, inclusion of PGD in the DSM-5 and ICD-11 was thought at risk of being misunderstood as medicalization of grief, as some thought that introducing PGD would result in over-prescriptions of psychotropic medication and abnormalize normal grief reactions. Another argument against the inclusion of PGD included concerns over cultural differences in persistent grief, as different cultures might experience grief differently. In spite of this concern, studies have shown good accuracy for the ICD-11 and DSM-5-TR definitions, and that nearly all bereaved individuals who met the criteria for PGD were receptive to treatment and their families relieved to know they had a recognizable syndrome. In addition, a 2020 study found that labeling PGD symptoms with a grief-specific diagnosis does not produce additional public stigma beyond the stigma of these severe grief reactions alone.
