= Acceptance =

Person's assent to the reality of a situation

Acceptance in psychology is a person's recognition and assent to the finality of a situation without attempting to change or protest it. This plays out at both the individual and societal level as people experience change.

== Types of acceptance ==
The term acceptance is a noun with various meanings.

=== Self-acceptance ===
Self-acceptance is described as the state of being satisfied with one's current self, or the ongoing process of striving to be satisfied with one's current self. It is an agreement with oneself to appreciate, validate, and support the self as it is, despite deficiencies and negative past behavior.

Some have trouble accepting themselves because of guilt, trauma, or a perceived lack of motivation. Self-acceptance has an effect on a person mentally, emotionally, within relationships and overall life.

=== Psychological acceptance ===
Acceptance is a core element of acceptance and commitment therapy (ACT) and cognitive behavioral therapy (CBT). In this context, acceptance is a process that involves actively contacting psychological internal experiences (emotions, sensations, urges, flashbacks, and other private events) directly, fully, without reacting or becoming defensive. The idea is to accept the things one cannot change, such as psychological experiences, but build the courage to change the things one can.

=== Social acceptance ===
Social acceptance, according to APA Dictionary of Psychology, means being included in a group, either formally or informally, and not being judged or disapproved of by others. It’s about how much people want to spend time with someone in both public and private situations. In other words, social acceptance is about fitting in with those around you, like classmates, coworkers, or friends. It shows whether people include you and don’t criticize or reject you.

Social acceptance can be defined as tolerating and welcoming the differences and diversity in others because most people attempt to look and act like others do in order to fit in. Data shows that those with high self-acceptance scores tend to accept others and feel accepted by others. This concern is heightened for children and teenagers who tend to desire being accepted by friends.

When it comes to mental disorders, social acceptance plays a big role in recovery. Many people do not understand mental illness, so they are unsure of how to embrace people who have a disease, leaving these people with feelings of isolation in friend groups. Being accepted by a friend and having support can help with mental health and give a healthy sense of self.

=== Public acceptance ===
Public acceptance is stated as a general agreement that something is satisfactory or right, or that someone should be included in a group.

An example of public acceptance would be the LGBTQ+ community. It is a very important aspect to the movement because it involves understanding, and inclusion of many individuals with different gender identities, and sexual orientation within the public and society in general.

=== Cultural acceptance ===
Cultural acceptance means respecting people for who they are without judging their culture, traditions, clothing, or appearance. It is the ability to accept the individual for their cultural beliefs and their principles. It's about understanding and valuing what makes someone unique and treating them with kindness and respect.

=== Parental acceptance ===
Parental acceptance is described as the affection, nurturance, support or simply the love a parent has for that child and the experience the children can gain from it.

=== Conditional acceptance ===
A type of acceptance that requires modification of the initial conditions before the final acceptance is made, is called conditional acceptance, or qualified acceptance. For instance, in a contract involving two parties, adjustments or modifications may be made to ensure it aligns with the satisfaction of both parties. When a person receives an offer and is willing to agree to it, provided that certain changes are made to its terms or certain conditions or events occur, it is referred to as conditional acceptance. In a business contract between a company and an employee, both parties have the option to change and modify the terms until mutual agreement or acceptance of the contract's details is reached.

=== Expressed acceptance ===
Expressed acceptance involves making an overt and unambiguous acceptance of the set conditions. For example, a person clearly and explicitly agrees to an offer. They accept the terms without any changes.

=== Implied acceptance ===
Implied acceptance refers to a situation where one's intent to consent to the presented conditions is understood or inferred, even if not explicitly stated. Acceptance is implied by an act that indicates a person's assent to the proposed bargain.

== Bibliography ==
- "The 5 stages of grief." Assortment Articles: Free Online Articles on Health, Science, Education & More. 12 Apr. 2009.
- "The Last Phase of Grief: Acceptance, Reorganization and Integration." Getting Past Your Past. 14 Apr. 2009.
- "The need for social acceptance and approval — its power." The Way. Art of Living. Essays. Topically arranged scripture, proverbs, precepts, quotations. Teachings of Jesus. Conservative Christian outlook emphasizing self-discipline, self-denial, integrity, principle, character, chastity, goodness, morality, virtue. 16 Apr. 2009.
- "Self Acceptance." Become Who You Want To Be. 16 Apr. 2009.
- "What A Difference A Friend Makes: Social Acceptance Is Key to Mental Health Recovery." Mental illness, mental health information center. 10 Apr. 2009.
