= Grief =

Response to loss in humans and other animals

- Other names: Mourning; grieving; bereavement
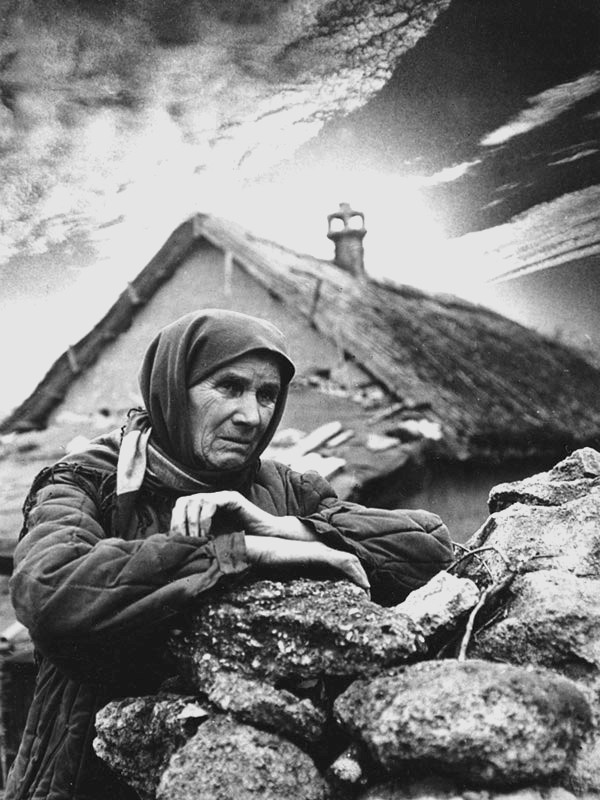
- Specialty: Psychology
- Treatment: Pastoral care, mental health professionals, social workers, support groups

Grief is the response to the loss of something deemed important, in particular the death of a person or animal to which a bond or affection was formed. Although conventionally focused on the emotional response to loss, grief also has physical, cognitive, behavioral, social, cultural, spiritual, political and philosophical dimensions. While the terms are often used interchangeably, bereavement refers to the state of loss, while grief is the reaction to that loss.

The grief associated with death is familiar to most people, but individuals grieve in connection with a variety of losses throughout their lives, such as unemployment, ill health or the end of a relationship. Loss can be categorized as either physical or abstract; physical loss is related to something that the individual can touch or measure, such as losing a spouse through death, while other types of loss are more abstract, possibly relating to aspects of a person's social interactions.

Modern research has moved beyond rigid stage-based models, such as Kübler-Ross's five stages, toward more flexible frameworks. One influential approach is Simon Shimshon Rubin's Two-Track Model of Bereavement, which focuses on both day-to-day functioning and the evolving emotional relationship with the deceased. George Bonanno's research further shows that most people demonstrate natural resilience, experiencing stable functioning despite significant losses, while acknowledging that grief can manifest as sadness, anger, anxiety, laughter, or even numbness.

In some cases, however, grief can become prolonged or debilitating, leading to complicated grief or prolonged grief disorder (PGD), where persistent longing and difficulty resuming normal routines interfere with life. Certain losses, such as the death of a spouse, child, or parent, tend to carry higher risks of depression and other mental health challenges. Studies on biological and cultural differences reveal that expressions of grief are highly diverse, while evolutionary theories suggest grief may help strengthen social bonds and survival behaviors.

== Grieving process ==
Between 1996 and 2006, there was extensive skepticism about a universal and predictable "emotional pathway" that leads from distress to "recovery" with an appreciation that grief is a more complex process of adapting to loss than stage and phase models have previously suggested. The two-track model of bereavement, created by Simon Shimshon Rubin in 1981, provided a deeper focus on the grieving process. The model examines the long-term effects of bereavement by measuring how well the person is adapting to the loss of a significant person in their life. The main objective of the two-track model of bereavement is for the individual to "manage and live in reality in which the deceased is absent", as well as return to normal biological functioning.

Track One is focused on the biopsychosocial functioning of grief. This focuses on the anxiety, depression, somatic concerns, traumatic responses, familial relationships, interpersonal relationships, self-esteem, meaning structure, work, and investment in life tasks. Rubin (2010) points out, "Track 1, the range of aspects of the individual's functioning across affective, interpersonal, somatic and classical psychiatric indicators is considered."

The significance of the closeness between the bereaved and the deceased is important to Track 1 because this could determine the severity of the mourning and grief the bereaved will endure. This first track is the response to extremely stressful life events and requires adaptation, change, and integration. The second track focuses on the ongoing relationship between the griever and the deceased. Track two mainly focuses on how the bereaved was connected to the deceased and what level of closeness was shared. The two main components considered are positive and negative memories and emotional involvement shared with the decedent. The stronger the relationship with the deceased, the greater the evaluation of the relationship with heightened shock.

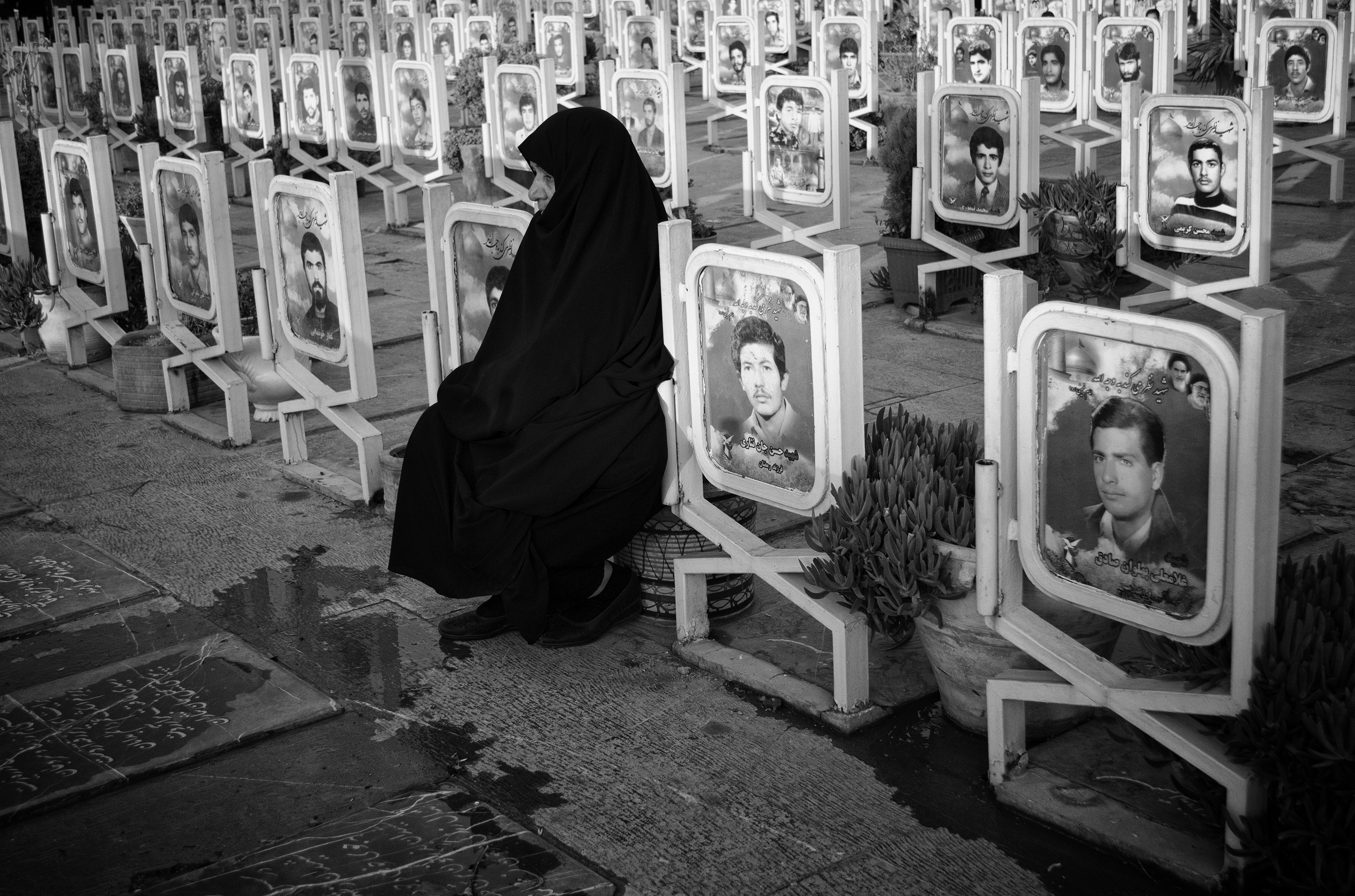
An Iranian mother mourning her son, who was killed in the Iran–Iraq War over 20 years earlier.

Any memory could be a trigger for the bereaved, the way the bereaved chose to remember their loved ones, and how the bereaved integrate the memory of their loved ones into their daily lives.

Ten main attributes to this track include imagery/memory, emotional distance, positive effect, negative effect, preoccupation with the loss, conflict, idealization, memorialization/transformation of the loss, impact on self-perception and loss process (shock, searching, disorganized). An outcome of this track is being able to recognize how transformation has occurred beyond grief and mourning. By outlining the main aspects of the bereavement process into two interactive tracks, individuals can examine and understand how grief has affected their life following loss and begin to adapt to this post-loss life. The Model offers a better understanding of the duration of time in the wake of one's loss and the outcomes that evolve from death. Using this model, researchers can effectively examine the response to an individual's loss by assessing the behavioral-psychological functioning and the relationship with the deceased.

The authors of What's Your Grief?, Litza Williams and Eleanor Haley, state in their understanding of the clinical and therapeutic uses of the model:

in terms of functioning, this model can help the bereaved identify which areas of his/her life has been impacted by the grief in a negative way as well as areas that the bereaved has already begun to adapt to after the loss. If the bereaved is unable to return to their normal functioning as in before loss occurred, it is likely they will find difficulty in the process of working through the loss as well as their separation from the deceased. Along the relational aspect, the bereaved can become aware of their relationship with the deceased and how it has changed or may change in the future (Williams & Haley, 2017).

"The Two-Track Model of Bereavement can help specify areas of mutuality (how people respond affectivity to trauma and change) and also difference (how bereaved people may be preoccupied with the deceased following loss compared to how they may be preoccupied with trauma following the exposure to it)" (Rubin, S.S, 1999).

While the grief response is considered a natural way of dealing with loss, prolonged, highly intense grief may, at times, become debilitating enough to be considered a disorder.

== Reactions ==
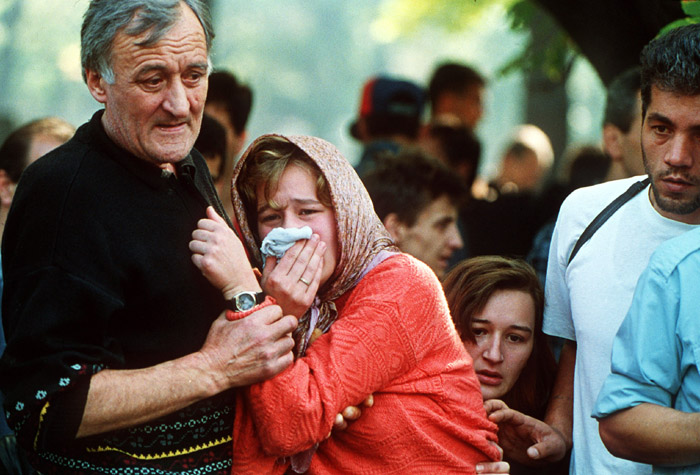
A family mourns during a funeral at the Lion's cemetery during the Siege of Sarajevo in 1992.

Grief can be experienced in a variety of ways. Crying is a normal and natural part of grieving. Crying and talking about the loss is not the only healthy response and, if forced or excessive, can be harmful. Lack of crying is also a natural, healthy reaction, potentially protective of the individual, and may also be seen as a sign of resilience. Grieving people are also likely to become anxious.

Some grief responses or actions, called "coping ugly" by researcher George Bonanno, may seem counter-intuitive or even appear dysfunctional, e.g., celebratory responses, laughter, or self-serving bias in interpreting events. Some healthy people who are grieving do not spontaneously talk about the loss. Pressing people to cry or retell the experience of a loss can be damaging. Genuine laughter is healthy.

When a loved one dies, it is not unusual for the bereaved to report that they have "seen" or "heard" the person they have lost. Most people who have experienced this report feeling comforted. In a 2008 survey conducted by Amanda Barusch, 27% of respondents who had lost a loved one reported having had this kind of "contact" experience. These experiences are correlated with pathology like grief complications.

== Bereavement science ==
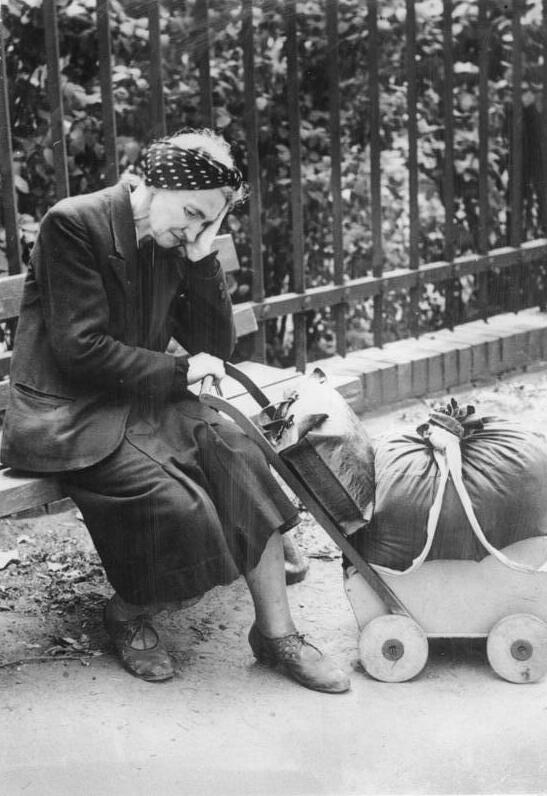
Grief can be caused by the loss of one's home and possessions, as occurs with refugees.

=== Bonanno's four trajectories of grief ===
George Bonanno, a professor of clinical psychology at Columbia University, conducted more than two decades of scientific studies on grief and trauma. Subjects of his studies number in the several thousand and include people who have suffered losses in the U.S. and cross-cultural studies in various countries around the world, such as Israel, Bosnia-Herzegovina, and China. His subjects suffered losses through war, terrorism, deaths of children, premature deaths of spouses, sexual abuse, childhood diagnoses of AIDS, and other potentially devastating loss events or potential trauma events.

His findings include that a natural resilience is the main component of grief and trauma reactions. The first researcher to use pre-loss data, he outlined four trajectories of grief. Bonanno's work has also demonstrated that absence of grief or trauma symptoms is a healthy outcome, rather than something to be feared as has been the thought and practice until his research. Because grief responses can take many forms, including laughter, celebration, and bawdiness, in addition to sadness, Bonanno coined the phrase "coping ugly" to describe the idea that some forms of coping may seem counter intuitive. Bonanno has found that resilience is natural to humans, suggesting that it cannot be "taught" through specialized programs and that there is virtually no existing research with which to design resilience training, nor is there existing research to support major investment in such things as military resilience training programs.

The four trajectories are as follows:

- Resilience: "The ability of adults in otherwise normal circumstances who are exposed to an isolated and potentially highly disruptive event, such as the death of a close relation or a violent or life-threatening situation, to maintain relatively stable, healthy levels of psychological and physical functioning" as well as "the capacity for generative experiences and positive emotions".
- Recovery: When "normal functioning temporarily gives way to threshold or sub-threshold psychopathology (e.g., symptoms of depression or post-traumatic stress disorder, or PTSD), usually for a period of at least several months, and then gradually returns to pre-event levels".
- Chronic dysfunction: Prolonged suffering and inability to function, usually lasting several years or longer.
- Delayed grief or trauma: When adjustment seems normal but then distress and symptoms increase months later. Researchers have not found evidence of delayed grief, but delayed trauma appears to be a genuine phenomenon.

=== "Five stages" model ===
The Kübler-Ross model, commonly known as the five stages of grief, describes a hypothesis first introduced by Elisabeth Kübler-Ross in her 1969 book, On Death and Dying.

The five stages are:

1. denial
2. anger
3. bargaining
4. depression
5. acceptance

This model found limited empirical support in a 2003 population based study. The study found that the sequence was correct although acceptance was highest at all points throughout the person's experience.

=== Continuing bonds ===
Continuing bonds is a bereavement theory that suggests that maintaining a lasting connection with a deceased loved one is a common part of grieving, rather than a hindrance to "moving on". In the recent times, both psychological literature and popular culture view ongoing bonds with the deceased as pathological in grief. According to the dominant model, the purpose of grief is to let go and move on. Toward the end of the 20th century, Dennis Klass, Phyllis Silverman, and Steven Nickman developed a prototype of grief that includes continuing interactions with the dead, while remaining "open to both the positive and negative consequences of this activity".

Among the various instances of continuing bonds include sensing the presence of the dead, maintaining connections through physical objects, having a belief that the deceased influences thoughts or events, and consciously integrating the deceased's characteristics into personal or group identity. While the intensity of these bonds may subside, they often persist in some form throughout a survivor's life. Attempting to completely leave the deceased behind would itself constitute a denial of reality, as relationships naturally persist and shape ongoing experiences and identities.

Meanwhile, maintaining bonds generally does not imply a failure to accept the permanence of the loss or the physical separation. Continuing bonds have been observed across diverse cultures and historical periods, reflecting the significant cognitive and emotional investment humans consistently place in their relationships with their departed loved ones.

Aside from this age-long cultural recognition, 20th-century psychological theories significantly diverged from these traditional views, claiming instead that severing ties with the deceased was very vital. The emergence of continuing bonds theory marked a major challenge to these prevailing ideas, prompting a reevaluation of what constitutes normative grieving. </include>

== Physiological and neurological processes ==
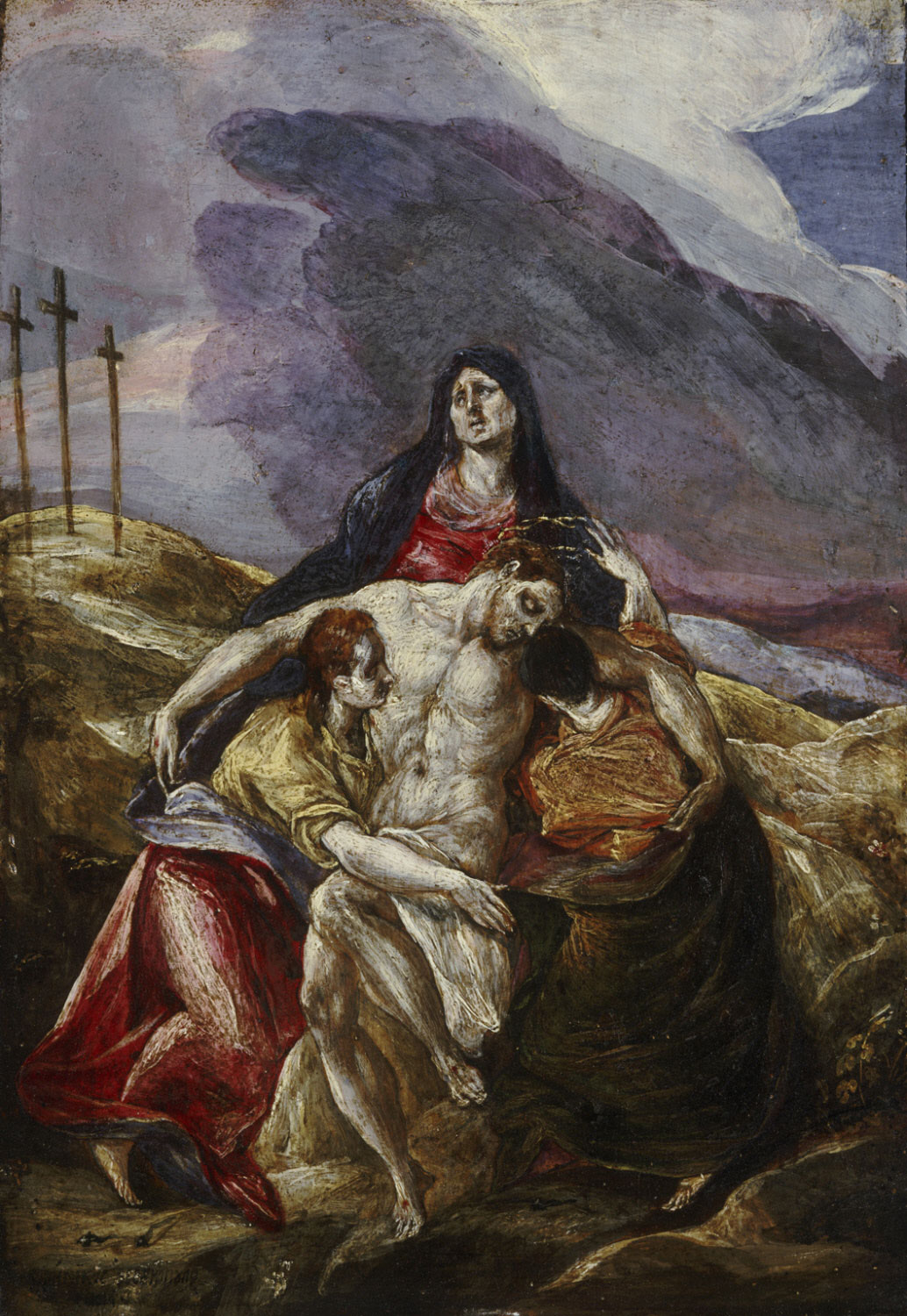
"Pietà" by El Greco, 1571–1576

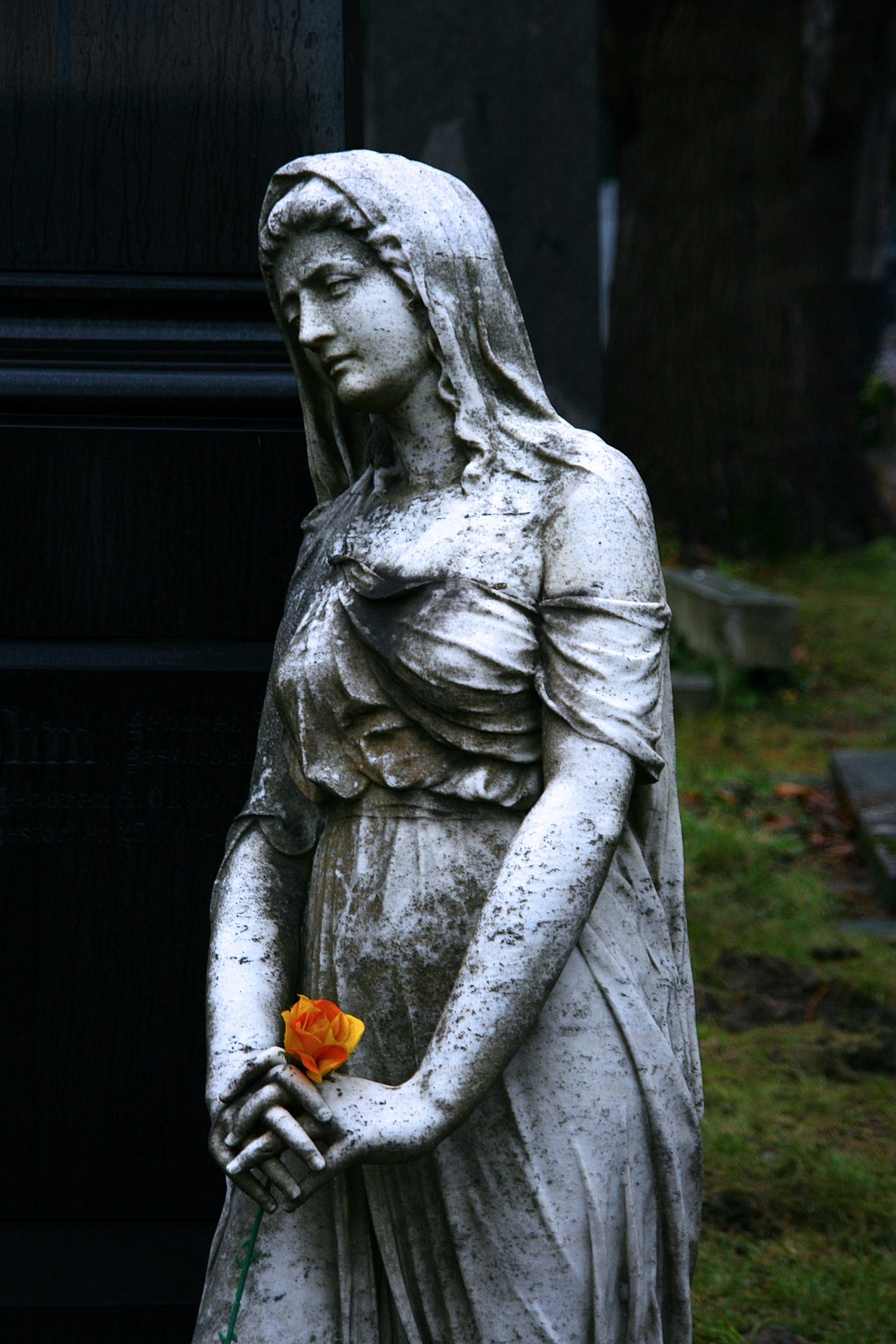
Grief in art: grave statue at Vienna Central Cemetery

Studies of fMRI scans of women from whom grief was elicited about the death of a mother or a sister in the past 5 years resulted in the conclusion that grief produced a local inflammation response as measured by salivary concentrations of pro-inflammatory cytokines. These responses were correlated with activation in the anterior cingulate cortex and orbitofrontal cortex. This activation also correlated with the free recall of grief-related word stimuli. This suggests that grief can cause stress, and that this reaction is linked to the emotional processing parts of the frontal lobe. Activation of the anterior cingulate cortex and vagus nerve is similarly implicated in the experience of heartbreak whether due to social rejection or bereavement.

Among those persons who have been bereaved within the previous three months of a given report, those who report many intrusive thoughts about the deceased show ventral amygdala and rostral anterior cingulate cortex hyperactivity to reminders of their loss. In the case of the amygdala, this links to their sadness intensity. In those individuals who avoid such thoughts, there is a related opposite type of pattern in which there is a decrease in the activation of the dorsal amygdala and the dorsolateral prefrontal cortex.

In those not so emotionally affected by reminders of their loss, studies of fMRI scans have been used to conclude that there is a high functional connectivity between the dorsolateral prefrontal cortex and amygdala activity, suggesting that the former regulates activity in the latter. In those people who had greater intensity of sadness, there was a low functional connection between the rostral anterior cingulate cortex and amygdala activity, suggesting a lack of regulation of the former part of the brain upon the latter.

== Evolutionary hypotheses ==
From an evolutionary perspective, grief is perplexing because it appears costly, and it is not clear what benefits it provides the sufferer. Several researchers have proposed functional explanations for grief, attempting to solve this puzzle. Sigmund Freud argued that grief is a process of libidinal reinvestment. The griever must, Freud argued, disinvest from the deceased, which is a painful process. But this disinvestment allows the griever to use libidinal energies on other, possibly new attachments, so it provides a valuable function. John Archer, approaching grief from an attachment theory perspective, argued that grief is a byproduct of the human attachment system. Generally, a grief-type response is adaptive because it compels a social organism to search for a lost individual (e.g., a mother or a child). However, in the case of death, the response is maladaptive because the individual is not simply lost and the griever cannot reunite with the deceased. Grief, from this perspective, is a painful cost of the human capacity to form commitments.

Other researchers such as Randolph Nesse have proposed that grief is a kind of psychological pain that orients the sufferer to a new existence without the deceased and creates a painful but instructive memory. If, for example, leaving an offspring alone led to the offspring's death, grief creates an intensively painful memory of the event, dissuading a parent from ever again leaving an offspring alone. More recently, Bo Winegard and colleagues argued that grief might be a socially selected signal of an individual's propensity for forming strong, committed relationships. From this social signaling perspective, grief targets old and new social partners, informing them that the griever is capable of forming strong social commitments. That is, because grief signals a person's capacity to form strong and faithful social bonds, those who displayed prolonged grief responses were preferentially chosen by alliance partners. The authors argue that throughout human evolution, grief was therefore shaped and elaborated by the social decisions of selective alliance partners.

== Risks ==
Bereavement, while a normal part of life, carries a degree of risk when severe. Severe reactions affect approximately 10% to 15% of people. Severe reactions mainly occur in people with depression present before the loss event. Severe grief reactions may carry over into family relations. Some researchers have found an increased risk of marital breakup following the death of a child, for example. Others have found no increase. John James, author of the Grief Recovery Handbook and founder of the Grief Recovery Institute, reported that his marriage broke up after the death of his infant son.

=== Health risks ===
Many studies have looked at the bereaved in terms of increased risks for stress-related illnesses. Colin Murray Parkes in the 1960s and 1970s in England noted increased doctor visits, with symptoms such as abdominal pain, breathing difficulties, and so forth in the first six months following a death. Others have noted increased mortality rates (Ward, A.W. 1976) and Bunch et al. found a five times greater risk of suicide in teens following the death of a parent. Research funded by the Medical Research Council found that people bereaved by the sudden death of a friend or family member by suicide are 65% more likely to attempt suicide, bringing the absolute risk to 1 in 10. Bereavement also increases the risk of heart attack.

=== Complicated grief ===
Prolonged grief disorder (PGD), formerly known as complicated grief disorder (CGD), is a pathological reaction to loss representing a cluster of empirically derived symptoms that have been associated with long-term physical and psycho-social dysfunction. Individuals with PGD experience severe grief symptoms for at least six months and are stuck in a maladaptive state. An attempt is being made to create a diagnosis category for complicated grief in the DSM-5. It is currently an "area for further study" in the DSM, under the name Persistent Complex Bereavement Disorder. Critics of including the diagnosis of complicated grief in the DSM-5 say that doing so will constitute characterizing a natural response as a pathology, and will result in wholesale medicating of people who are essentially normal.

Shear and colleagues found an effective treatment for complicated grief, by treating the reactions in the same way as trauma reactions.

Complicated grief is not synonymous with grief. Complicated grief is characterised by an extended grieving period and other criteria, including mental and physical impairments. An important part of understanding complicated grief is understanding how the symptoms differ from normal grief. The Mayo Clinic states that with normal grief the feelings of loss are evident. When the reaction turns into complicated grief, however, the feelings of loss become incapacitating and continue even though time passes. The signs and symptoms characteristic of complicated grief are listed as "extreme focus on the loss and reminders of the loved one, intense longing or pining for the deceased, problems accepting the death, numbness or detachment ... bitterness about your loss, inability to enjoy life, depression or deep sadness, trouble carrying out normal routines, withdrawing from social activities, feeling that life holds no meaning or purpose, irritability or agitation, lack of trust in others". The symptoms seen in complicated grief are specific because the symptoms seem to be a combination of the symptoms found in separation as well as traumatic distress. They are also considered to be complicated because, unlike normal grief, these symptoms will continue regardless of the amount of time that has passed and despite treatment given from tricyclic antidepressants. Individuals with complicated grief symptoms are likely to have other mental disorders such as PTSD (post traumatic stress disorder), depression, anxiety, etc.

Complicated grief cases are multifactorial, and complicated grief is distinguished from major depression and post-traumatic stress disorder. Evidence shows that complicated grief is a more severe and prolonged version of acute grief than a completely different type of grief. While only affecting 2 to 3% of people in the world, complicated grief is usually contracted when a loved one dies suddenly and in a violent way.

=== Disenfranchised grief ===
Disenfranchised grief is a term describing grief that is not acknowledged by society. Examples of events leading to disenfranchised grief are the death of a friend, the loss of a pet, a trauma in the family a generation prior, the loss of a home or place of residence particularly in the case of children, who generally have little or no control in such situations, and whose grief may not be noticed or understood by caregivers. American military children and teens in particular moving a great deal while growing up, an aborted or miscarried pregnancy, a parent's loss or surrender of a child to adoption, a child's loss of their birth parent to adoption, the death of a loved one due to a socially unacceptable cause such as suicide, or the death of a celebrity.

There are fewer support systems available for people who experience disenfranchised grief compared to those who are going through a widely recognized form of grief. Therefore, people who suffer disenfranchised grief undergo a more complicated grieving process. They may feel angry and depressed due to the lack of public validation which leads to the inability to fully express their sorrow. Moreover, they may not receive sufficient social support and feel isolated.

== Examples of bereavement ==
=== Death of a child ===
It is a fearful thing to love
What Death can touch.
Josephine Jacobsen, The Instant of Knowing (Library of Congress, 1974), 7.

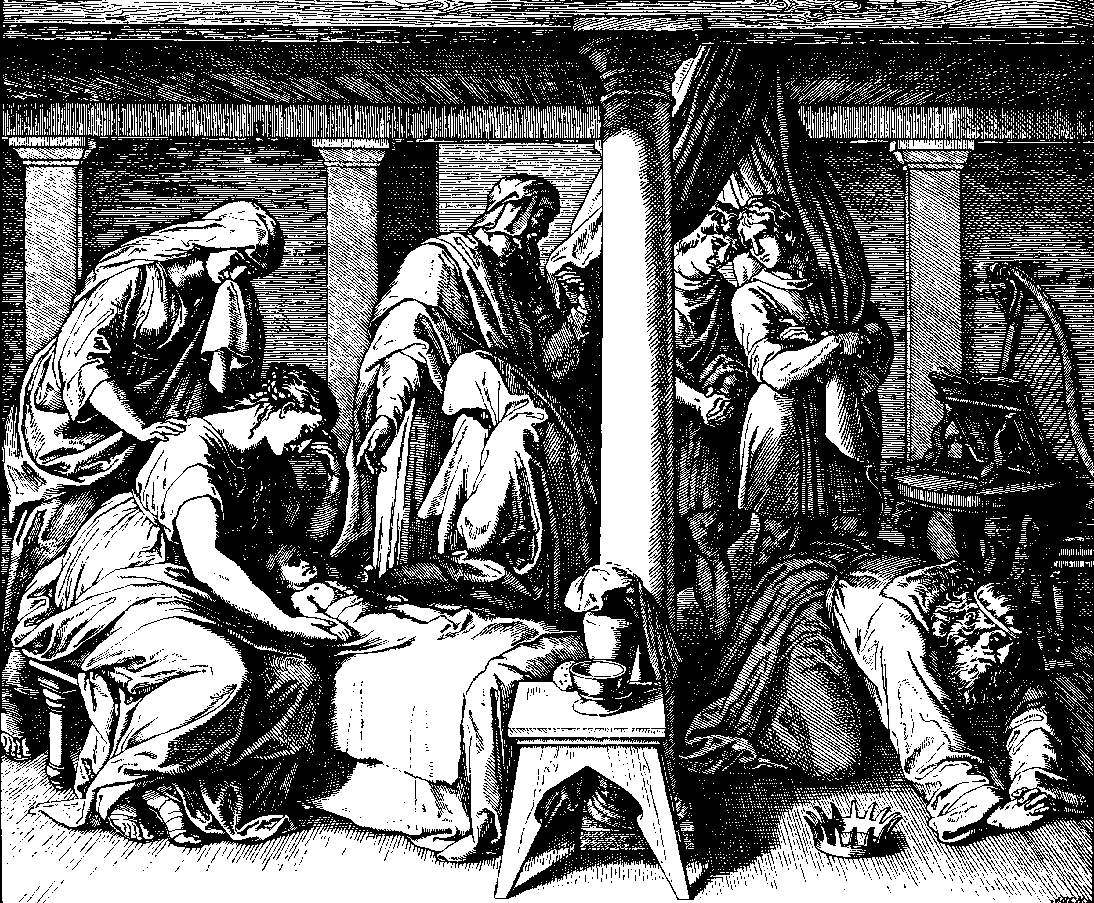
This 1860 woodcut by Julius Schnorr von Karolsfeld depicts the death of Bathsheba's first child with David

Death of a child can take the form of a loss in infancy such as miscarriage, stillbirth, neonatal death, SIDS, or the death of an older child. Among adults over the age of 50, approximately 11% have been predeceased by at least one of their offspring.

In most cases, parents find the grief almost unbearably devastating, and it tends to hold greater risk factors than any other loss. This loss also bears a lifelong process: one does not get 'over' the death but instead must assimilate and live with it. Intervention and comforting support can make all the difference to the survival of a parent in this type of grief but the risk factors are great and may include family breakup or suicide.

Feelings of guilt, whether legitimate or not, are pervasive, and the dependent nature of the relationship disposes parents to a variety of problems as they seek to cope with this great loss. Parents who suffer miscarriage or a regretful or coerced abortion may experience resentment towards others who experience successful pregnancies.

=== Death of a spouse ===
Many widows and widowers describe losing 'half' of themselves. A factor is the manner in which the spouse died. The survivor of a spouse who died of an illness has a different experience of such loss than a survivor of a spouse who died by an act of violence. Often, the spouse who is "left behind" may suffer from depression and loneliness, and may feel it necessary to seek professional help in dealing with their new life.

A historical example of profound spousal grief is that of Mughal Emperor Shah Jahan following the death of his wife Mumtaz Mahal in 1631 during childbirth. Contemporary accounts describe Shah Jahan as "paralysed by grief," with reports of him entering a period of deep mourning, during which he reportedly secluded himself, ceased listening to music, and abandoned lavish attire for years. In response to his loss, Shah Jahan commissioned the Taj Mahal as her mausoleum, widely regarded as a monument to enduring love and grief.

Furthermore, most couples have a division of 'tasks' or 'labor', e.g., the husband mows the yard, the wife pays the bills, etc. which, in addition to dealing with great grief and life changes, means added responsibilities for the bereaved. Planning and financing a funeral can be very difficult if pre-planning was not completed. Changes in insurance, bank accounts, claiming of life insurance, securing childcare can also be intimidating to someone who is grieving. Social isolation may also become imminent, as many groups composed of couples find it difficult to adjust to the new identity of the bereaved, and the bereaved themselves have great challenges in reconnecting with others. Widows of many cultures, for instance, wear black for the rest of their lives to signify the loss of their spouse and their grief. Only in more recent decades has this tradition been reduced to a period of two years, while some religions such as Orthodox Christianity many widows will still continue to wear black for the remainder of their lives.

=== Death of a sibling ===
Grieving siblings are often referred to as the 'forgotten mourners' who are made to feel as if their grief is not as severe as their parents' grief. However, the sibling relationship tends to be the longest significant relationship of the lifespan and siblings who have been part of each other's lives since birth, such as twins, help form and sustain each other's identities; with the death of one sibling comes the loss of that part of the survivor's identity because "your identity is based on having them there".

If siblings were not on good terms or close with each other, then intense feelings of guilt may ensue on the part of the surviving sibling (guilt may also ensue for having survived, not being able to prevent the death, having argued with their sibling, etc.)

=== Death of a parent ===
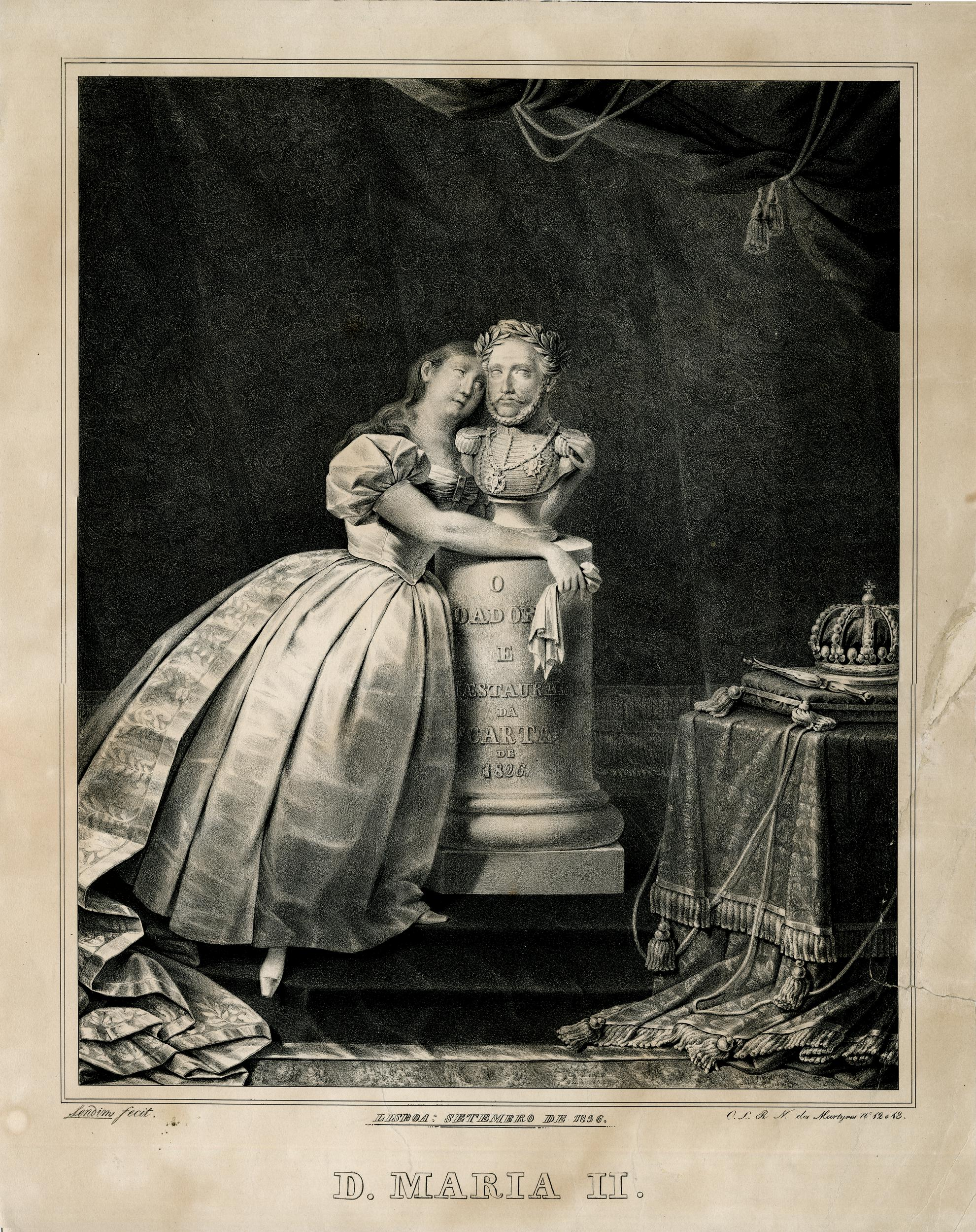
Queen Maria II of Portugal crying and hugging a bust of her late father King Pedro IV (also Emperor of Brazil as Pedro I), 1836

==== For an adult ====
When an adult child loses a parent in later adulthood, it is considered to be "timely" and to be a normative life course event. This allows the adult children to feel a permitted level of grief. However, research shows that the death of a parent in an adult's midlife is not a normative event by any measure, but is a major life transition causing an evaluation of one's own life or mortality. Others may shut out friends and family in processing the loss of someone with whom they have had the longest relationship.

In developed countries, people typically lose parents after the age of 50.

==== For a child ====
For a child, the death of a parent, without support to manage the effects of the grief, may result in long-term psychological harm. This is more likely if the adult carers are struggling with their own grief and are psychologically unavailable to the child. There is a critical role of the surviving parent or caregiver in helping the children adapt to a parent's death. However, losing a parent at a young age also has some positive effects. Some children had an increased maturity, better coping skills and improved communication. Adolescents who lost a parent valued other people more than those who have not experienced such a close loss.

=== Loss during childhood ===
When a parent or caregiver dies or leaves, children may have symptoms of psychopathology, but they are less severe than in children with major depression. The loss of a parent, grandparent or sibling can be very troubling in childhood, but even in childhood, there are age differences in relation to the loss. A very young child, under one or two, may be found to have no reaction if a carer dies, but other children may be affected by the loss.

At a time when trust and dependency are formed, even mere separation can cause problems in well-being. This is especially true if the loss is around critical periods such as 8–12 months, when attachment and separation are at their height and even a brief separation from a parent or other caregiver can cause distress.

Even as a child grows older, death is still difficult to fathom and this affects how a child responds. For example, younger children see death more as a separation, and may believe death is curable or temporary. Reactions can manifest themselves in "acting out" behaviors, a return to earlier behaviors such as thumb sucking, clinging to a toy or angry behavior. Though they do not have the maturity to mourn as an adult, they feel the same intensity. As children enter pre-teen and teen years, there is a more mature understanding.

Adolescents may respond by delinquency, or oppositely become "over-achievers". Repetitive actions are not uncommon such as washing a car repeatedly or taking up repetitive tasks such as sewing, computer games, etc. It is an effort to stay above the grief. Childhood loss can predispose a child not only to physical illness but to emotional problems and an increased risk for suicide, especially in the adolescent period.

Grief can be experienced as a result of losses due to causes other than death. For example, women who have been physically, psychologically or sexually abused often grieve over the damage to or the loss of their ability to trust. This is likely to be experienced as disenfranchised grief.

In relation to the specific issue of child sexual abuse, it has been argued by some commentators that the concepts of loss and grief offer particularly useful analytical frames for understanding both the impact of child sexual abuse and therapeutic ways to respond to it. From this perspective, child sexual abuse may represent for many children multiple forms of loss: not only of trust but also loss of control over their bodies, loss of innocence and indeed loss of their very childhoods.

Relocations can cause children significant grief particularly if they are combined with other difficult circumstances such as neglectful or abusive parental behaviors, other significant losses, etc.

==== Loss of a friend or classmate ====
Children may experience the death of a friend or a classmate through illness, accidents, suicide, or violence. Initial support involves reassuring children that their emotional and physical feelings are normal.

Survivor guilt (or survivor's guilt; also called survivor syndrome or survivor's syndrome) is a mental condition that occurs when a person perceives themselves to have done wrong by surviving a traumatic event when others did not. It may be found among survivors of combat, natural disasters, epidemics, among the friends and family of those who have died by suicide, and in non-mortal situations such as among those whose colleagues are laid off.

=== Other losses ===
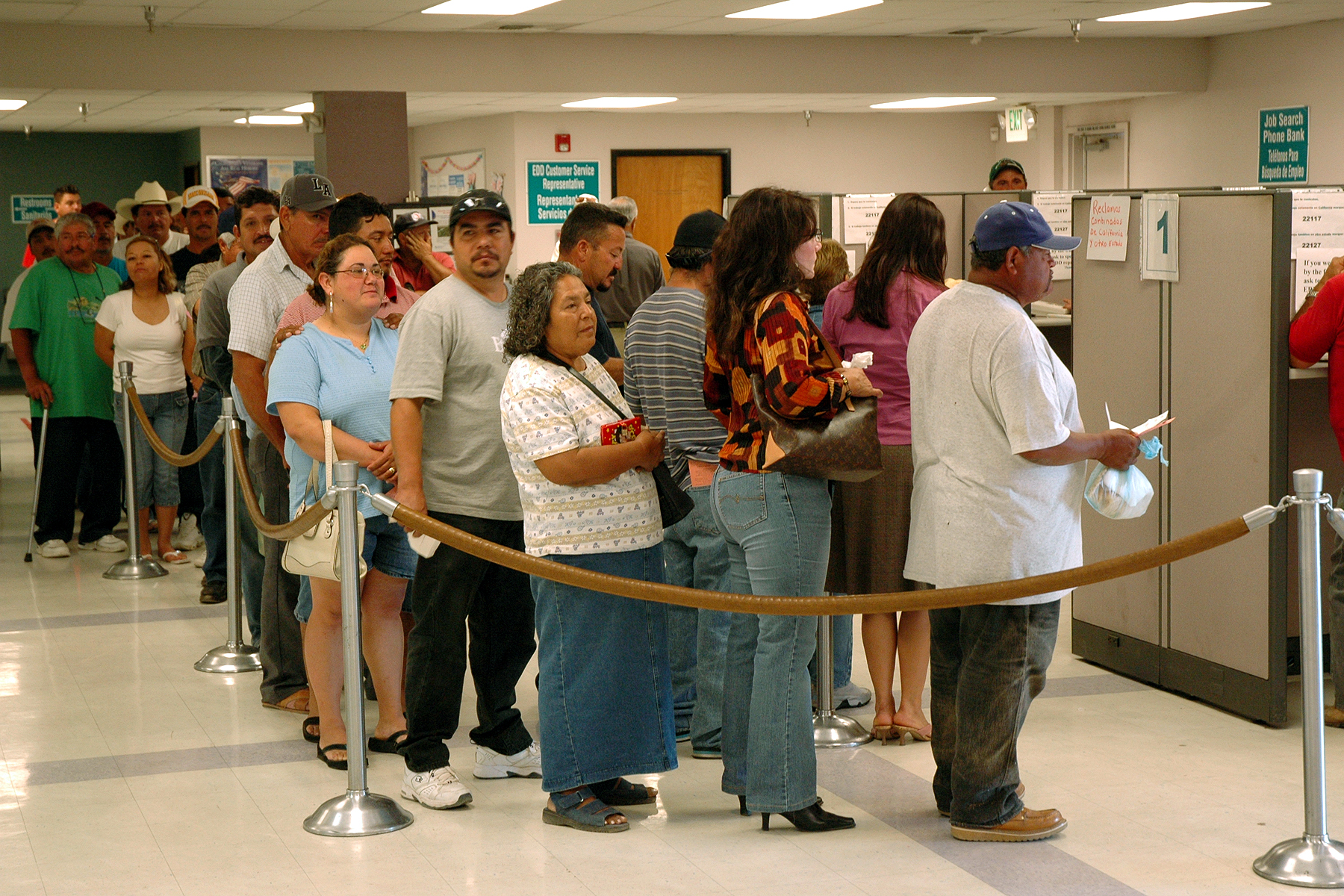
People who lose their jobs, such as these people in California, may experience grief.

Parents may grieve due to loss of children through means other than death, for example through loss of custody in divorce proceedings; legal termination of parental rights by the government, such as in cases of child abuse; through kidnapping; because the child voluntarily left home (either as a runaway or, for overage children, by leaving home legally); or because an adult refuses or is unable to have contact with a parent. This loss differs from the death of a child in that the grief process is prolonged or denied because of hope that the relationship will be restored.

Grief may occur after the loss of a romantic relationship (i.e. divorce or break up), a vocation, a pet (animal loss), a home, children leaving home (empty nest syndrome), sibling(s) leaving home, a friend, a faith in one's religion, etc. A person who strongly identifies with their occupation may feel a sense of grief if they have to stop their job due to retirement, being laid off, injury, or loss of certification. Those who have experienced a loss of trust will often also experience some form of grief.

==== Veteran bereavement ====
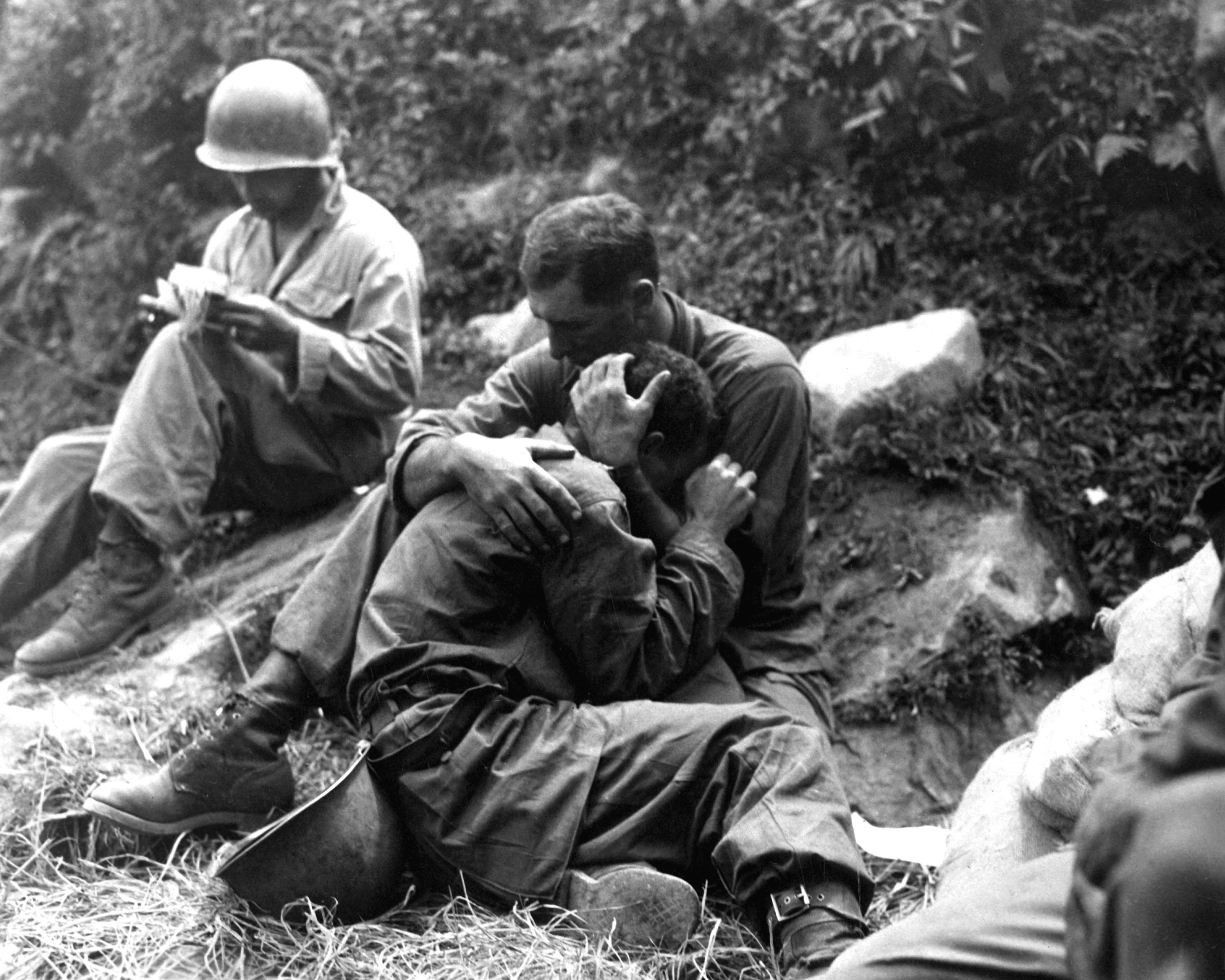
A grief-stricken American soldier is comforted by a fellow soldier after a friend is killed in action during the Korean War.

The grief of living veteran soldiers is often ignored. Psychological effects and post traumatic syndrome disorder have been researched and studied but very few focus on grief and bereavement specifically. Additionally, there have been many studies conducted about families losing members who were in the military but little about soldiers themselves. There are many monuments paying respect to those who were lost which emphasizes the lack of focus living veterans and soldiers get in regards to grief.

=== Gradual bereavement ===
Many of the above examples of bereavement happen abruptly, but there are also cases of being gradually bereft of something or someone. For example, the gradual loss of a loved one by Alzheimer's produces a "gradual grief".

The author Kara Tippetts described her dying of cancer, as dying "by degrees": her "body failing" and her "abilities vanishing". Milton Crum, writing about gradual bereavement says that "every degree of death, every death of a person's characteristics, every death of a person's abilities, is a bereavement".

== Support ==
=== Professional support ===
Many people who grieve do not need professional help. Some may seek additional support from licensed psychologists or psychiatrists. Support resources available to the bereaved may include grief counseling, professional support-groups or educational classes, and peer-led support groups. In the United States of America, local hospice agencies may provide a first contact for those seeking bereavement support.

Grief can result in depression or alcohol and drug abuse and, if left untreated, it can become severe enough to impact daily living. Medline Plus recommends contacting a medical professional if "you can't deal with grief, you are using excessive amounts of drugs or alcohol, you become very depressed, or you have prolonged depression that interferes with your daily life". Other reasons to seek medical attention may include: "Can focus on little else but your loved one's death, have persistent pining or longing for the deceased person, have thoughts of guilt or self-blame, believe that you did something wrong or could have prevented the death, feel as if life is not worth living, have lost your sense of purpose in life, wish you had died along with your loved one".

Professionals can use multiple ways to help someone cope and move through their grief. Hypnosis is sometimes used as an adjunct therapy in helping patients experiencing grief. Hypnosis enhances and facilitates mourning and helps patients to resolve traumatic grief. Art therapy may also be used to allow the bereaved to process their grief in a non-verbal way.

Lichtenthal and Cruess studied how bereavement-specific written disclosure had benefits in helping adjust to loss, and in helping improve the effects of post-traumatic stress disorder (PTSD), prolonged grief disorder, and depression. Directed writing helped many of the individuals who had experienced a loss of a significant relationship. It involved individuals trying to make meaning out of the loss through meaning-making (making sense of what happened and the cause of the death), or through benefit finding (consideration of the global significance of the loss of one's goals, and helping the family develop a greater appreciation of life). This meaning-making can come naturally for some, but many need direct intervention to "move on".

=== Support groups ===
Support groups for bereaved individuals follow a diversity of patterns. Many are organized purely as peer-to-peer groups such as local chapters of the Compassionate Friends, an international group for bereaved parents. Other grief support groups are led by professionals, perhaps with the assistance of peers. Some support groups deal with specific problems, such as learning to plan meals and cook for only for one person.

== Cultural differences in grieving ==
Each culture specifies manners such as rituals, styles of dress, or other habits, as well as attitudes, in which the bereaved are encouraged or expected to take part. An analysis of non-Western cultures suggests that beliefs about continuing ties with the deceased varies. In Japan, maintenance of ties with the deceased is accepted and carried out through religious rituals. In the Hopi of Arizona, the women go into self-induced hallucinations where they conjure images of the deceased loved one to mourn and process their grief.

Different cultures grieve in different ways, but all have ways that are vital in healthy coping with the death of a loved one. The American family's approach to grieving was depicted in "The Grief Committee", by T. Glen Coughlin. The short story gives an inside look at how the American culture has learned to cope with the tribulations and difficulties of grief. The story is taught in the course, "The Politics of Mourning: Grief Management in a Cross-Cultural Fiction" at Columbia University.

== In those with neurodevelopmental disorders ==
Contrary to popular belief, people with neurodevelopmental disorders, such as autistic individuals and those with an intellectual disability, are able to process grief in a similar manner to non-autistic individuals. However, the ways in which others interact with individuals with neurodevelopmental disorders may impact the ways in which they perceive, process, and express their grief; this is typically seen in association with the double taboo of death and disability, which leads to those with neurodevelopmental disorders often not being appropriately informed of a loss or its significance and excluded or discouraged from attending events related to the loss (e.g. funerals).

Moreover, one of the main differences between those with an intellectual disability and those without is typically the ability to verbalize their feelings about the loss, which is why non-verbal cues and changes in behavior become so important, because these are usually signs of distress and expressions of grief among this population. This difficulty of expressing the emotional impact of a loss in a neuronormative way is seen across neurodevelopmental disorders and often leads to their grief reactions going unrecognized and/or misunderstood by those around them; for example, authentic grief reactions in autistic individuals and/or individuals with an intellectual disability may just be labelled as challenging behavior by those supporting and caring for them. As such, it is important when working with individuals with neurodevelopmental disorders to remember that they may express and understand their grief in non-neuronormative ways, such as in perseveration and repeating words related to death (a form of echophenomena known as echothanatologia). Moreover, it is important that caregivers and family members of individuals with neurodevelopmental disorders meet them at their level of understanding and allow them to process the loss and grief with assistance given where needed, and not to ignore the grief that these individuals undergo and the unique ways in which they may express their grief.

An important aspect of supporting the processing of grief for those with neurodevelopmental disorders is narrative and storytelling, as this can help individuals understand death and loss and express their grief at a level appropriate to their own understanding. Moreover, another important aspect of support is family involvement where possible, which should focus on promoting inclusion in events before and after the loss (e.g. visiting hospital to see a dying relative, attending the funeral, being able to visit the grave, etc.) and ensuring individuals have information about these events provided to them at their level of understanding and their choices respected, such as whether or not they want to attend a funeral service. By having the involvement of family and friends in an open and supporting dialogue with the individual, being mindful of the double taboo of death and disability, it helps individuals with neurodevelopmental disorders to process, understand, and feel included. However, if those supporting the individual are not properly educated on how those with different neurodevelopmental profiles process, understand, and express grief, their involvement may not be as beneficial than those who are aware of the potential differences, and ultimately may prove harmful in areas beyond practical support. Furthermore, the importance of the family unit is very crucial in a socio-cognitive approach to bereavement counseling; in this approach the disabled individual has the opportunity to see how those around them handle the loss and have the opportunity to act accordingly by modeling and mirroring behavior. This approach also helps the individual know that their emotions are acceptable, valid, and normal.

Lastly, in terms of grieving non-death loss in relation to neurodevelopmental conditions, specifically autism and ADHD, current research suggests that those receiving a diagnosis in adulthood may experience physical, social, and emotional reactions within an oscillating cycle of grief, relief, and (self-)belief.

== In animals ==
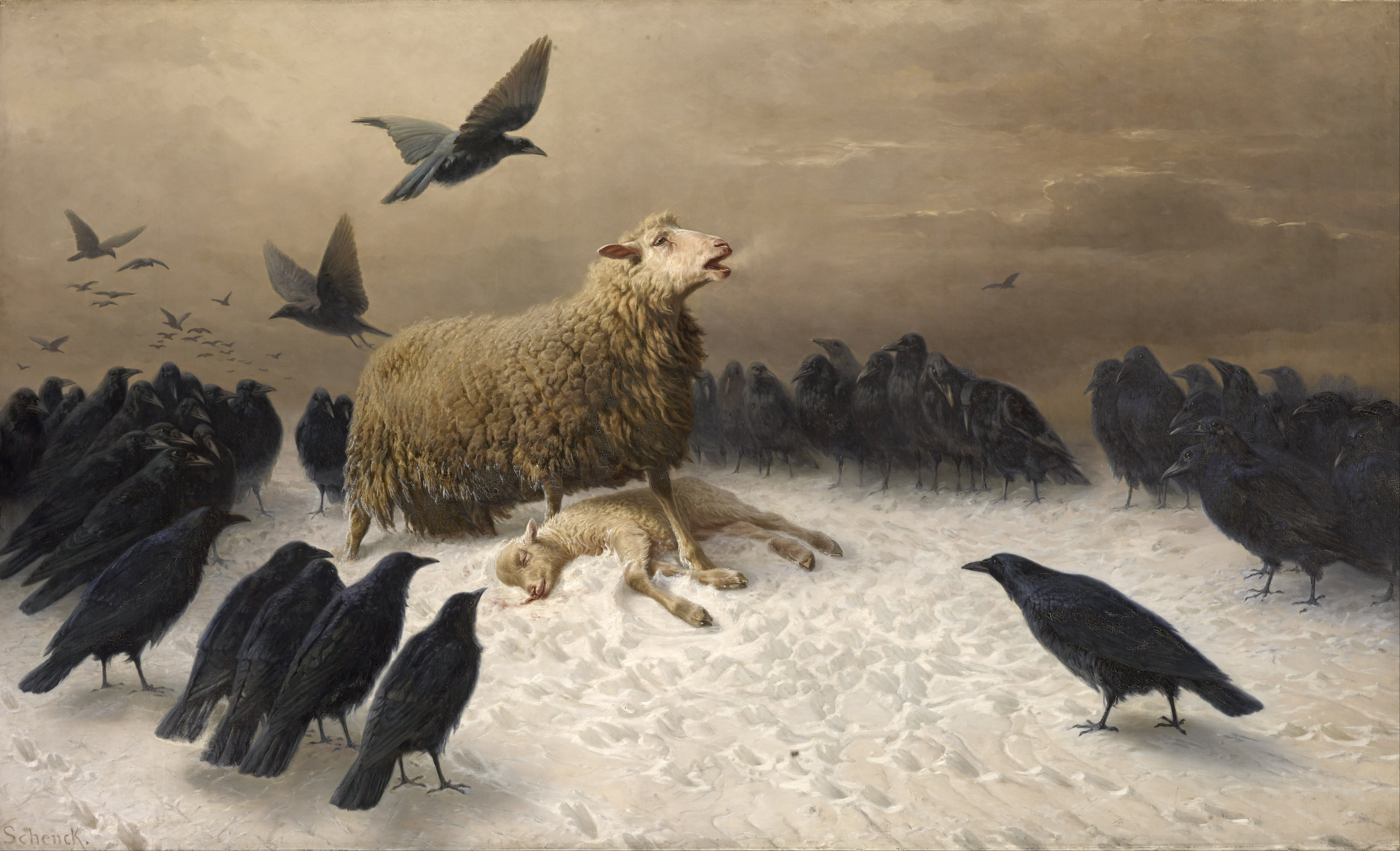
In August Friedrich Schenck's 1878 painting Anguish, a grieving ewe mourns the death of her lamb.

Previously it was believed that grief was only a human emotion, but studies have shown that other animals have shown grief or grief-like states during the death of another animal, most notably elephants, wolves, apes, and goats. This can occur between bonded animals which are animals that attempt to survive together (i.e. a pack of wolves or mated prairie voles). There is evidence that animals experience grief in the loss of their group member, a mate, or their owner for many days. Some animals show their grief for their loss for many years. When animals are grieving, their life routines change the same as humans. For instance, they may stop eating, isolate themselves, or change their sleeping routine by taking naps instead of sleeping during the night. After the death of their group member or a mate, some of the animals become depressed, while others like the bonobo keep the dead bodies of their babies for a long time. Cats try to find their dead fellow with a mourning cry, and dogs and horses become depressed.

Since it is more difficult to study emotion in animals because of the lack of clear communication, in effort to study grief, research has been done on hormone levels. One study found that "females [baboons] showed significant increases in stress hormones called glucocorticoids". The female baboons then increased grooming, promoting physical touch, which releases "oxytocin, which inhibits glucocorticoid release".

=== Mammals ===
Mammals have demonstrated grief-like states, especially between a mother and her offspring. She will often stay close to her dead offspring for short periods of time and may investigate the reasons for the baby's non-response. For example, some deer will often sniff, poke, and look at its lifeless fawn before realizing it is dead and leaving it to rejoin the herd shortly afterwards. Other animals, such as a lioness, will pick up its cub in its mouth and place it somewhere else before abandoning it.

When a baby chimpanzee or gorilla dies, the mother will carry the body around for several days before she may finally be able to move on without it; this behavior has been observed in other primates, as well. The Royal Society suggests that, "Such interactions have been proposed to be related to maternal condition, attachment, environmental conditions or reflect a lack of awareness that the infant has died." Jane Goodall has described chimpanzees as exhibiting mournful behavior toward the loss of a group member with silence and by showing more attention to it. And they will often continue grooming it and stay close to the carcass until the group must move on without it. One example of this Goodall observed was of a chimpanzee mother of three who had died. The siblings stayed by their mother's body the whole day. Of the three siblings the youngest showed the most agitation by screaming and became depressed but was able to recover by the care of the two older siblings. However, the youngest refused behavior from the siblings that were similar to the mother. Another notable example is Koko, a gorilla who was taught sign language, who expressed sadness and even described sadness about the death of her pet cat, All Ball.

Animals have sometimes shown grief for their partners or "friends". When two chimpanzees form a bond together, sexual or not, and one of them dies, the surviving chimpanzee will show signs of grief, ripping out their hair in anger and starting to cry; if the body is removed, they will resist, they will eventually go quiet when the body is gone, but upon seeing the body again, the chimp will return to a violent state.

Elephants have shown unusual behavior upon encountering the remains of another deceased elephant. They will often investigate it by touching and grabbing it with their trunks and have the whole herd stand around it for long periods of time until they must leave it behind. It is unknown whether they are mourning over it and showing sympathy, or are just curious and investigating the dead body. Elephants are thought to be able to discern relatives even from their remains. When encountering the body of a deceased elephant or human, elephants have been witnessed covering the body with vegetation and soil in what seems to be burial behavior. An episode of the seminal BBC documentary series Life on Earth shows this in detail – the elephants, upon finding a dead herd member, pause for several minutes at a time, and carefully touch and hold the dead creature's bones.

Anthropologist Barbara J. King has suggested that one way to evaluate the expression of grief in animals is to look for altered behaviors such as social withdrawal, disrupted eating or sleeping, expression of affect, or increased stress reactions in response to the death of a family member, mate, or friend. These criteria do not assume the ability to anticipate death, understand its finality, or experience emotions equivalent to those of humans, but at the same time do not rule out the possibility of those abilities existing in some animals or that different kinds of emotional experiences might constitute grief. Based on these criteria, King gives examples of observed potential mourning behaviors in animals such as cetaceans, apes and monkeys, elephants, domesticated animals (including dogs, cats, rabbits, horses, and farmed animals), giraffes, peccaries, donkeys, prairie voles, and some species of birds.

=== Birds ===
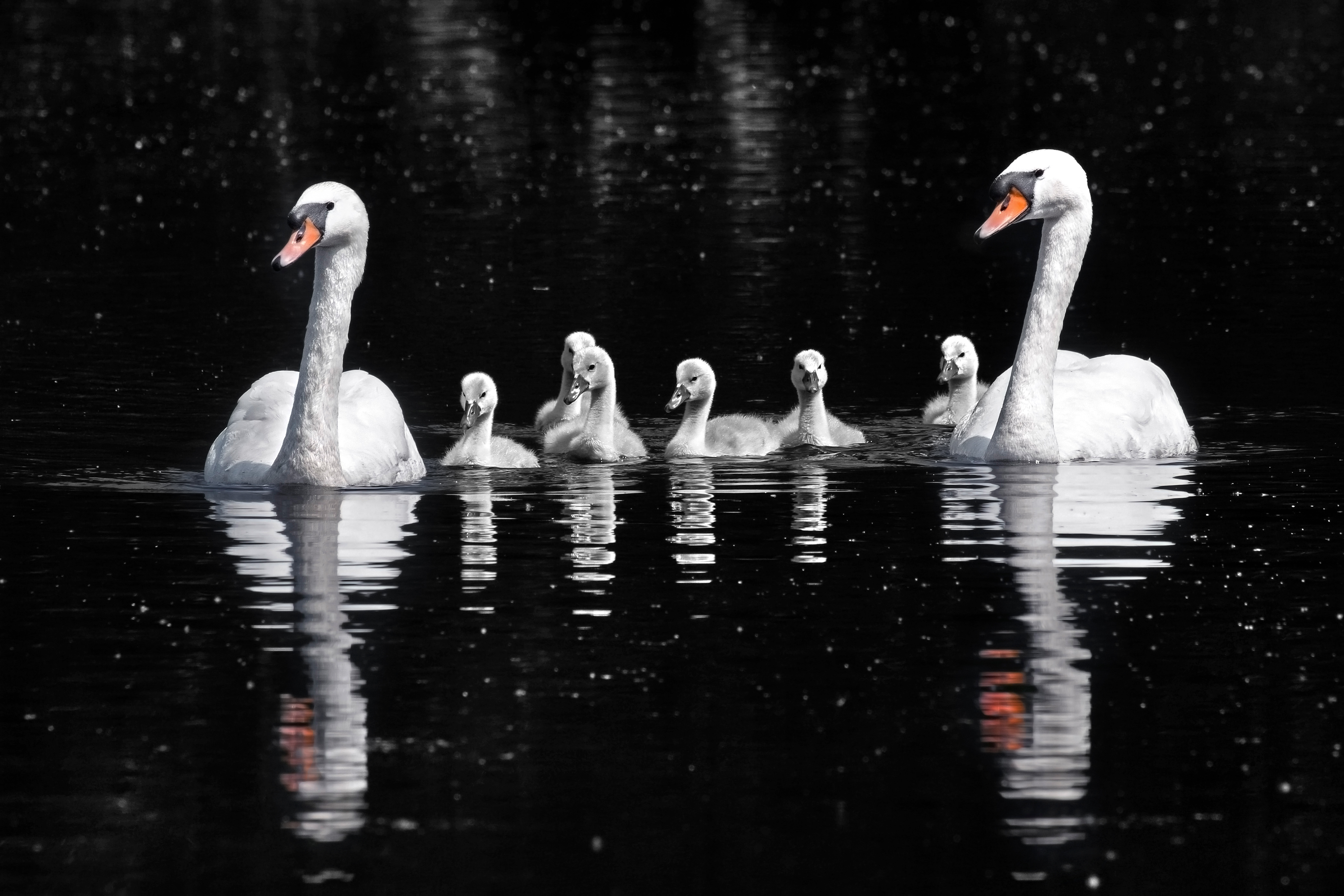
Mute swans (Cygnus olor) are known to grieve in response to the death or loss of their mate or offspring.

Corvids, penguins and water birds - among others - have been observed expressing grief and engaging in behaviour seen to be similar to mourning; crows and magpies are known to conduct complex ritualistic behaviours in response to seeing a dead conspecific. Mute swans are known to grieve for the loss of a partner or cygnet, and are known to engage in pining for days, weeks or even months at a time. Other species of swans such as the black swan have also been observed mourning the loss of a close relative.

== See also ==
- Animal loss
- Anomalous experiences
- Anticipatory grief
- Association for Death Education and Counseling
- Funeral
- Intuitive–instrumental grief
- List of counseling topics
- Major depressive disorder
- Mourning
- Pet bereavement
- Postponement of affect § Grief
- Thanatosensitivity
