= Margaret Shandor Miles =

Pediatric nurse pioneer

Margaret Shandor "Marge" Miles, BSN, PhD, FAAN (born 1937) is an American pediatric nurse, researcher, and Professor Emerita at the School of Nursing at the University of North Carolina at Chapel Hill. She is known for her work on stress in the NICU and PICU, bereavement, and family-centered nursing care. She was named a fellow in the American Academy of Nursing (AAN) in 1982, served as the founding president of the Society of Pediatric Nurses from 1990 to 1992, and, in 2013, was given the highest distinction awarded by the AAN, a Living Legend. She is the author of over 140 journal articles and book chapters, has been cited over 8,000 times, and the nursing tools she developed throughout her career are used worldwide to improve family-centered care. Her research has been funded by the National Institute of Nursing Research (NINR), the NCCU Center for Translational Health Equity Research, the National Institute of Health (NIH), the National Institute of Mental Health (NIMH), the National Kidney Foundation, and many more.

== Early life and education ==
Miles was born in 1937. She obtained her Bachelor of Science in Nursing (BSN) cum laude from Boston College in 1963, and was a member of the Mater Spei Honor Society, a graduate nursing honor society. In 1965, she completed her registered nurse (RN) license and masters in nursing (MN) cum laude at the University of Pittsburgh. Her master's thesis was on body integrity fears in toddlers. She then went on to earn her doctoral degree (PhD) in counseling psychology from the University of Missouri-Kansas City in 1976. She wrote her thesis on the effects of small group education and counseling on the attitudes of nurses towards death and dying patients.

== Career and research ==
As a young nurse at Pittsburgh's Mercy Hospital, Miles encountered a teenager's suicide. After switching to pediatric nursing, she began to focus her career on counseling grieving parents and the impact of child's death on family. She taught at the University of Kansas in Kansas City until 1984, when she moved to the University of North Carolina at Chapel Hill, and taught graduate students in the top-ranked School of Nursing.

Miles was a pioneer in pediatric nursing. Prior to her research on family-centered care, the healthcare field did not think mothers and families were essential for the survival of their hospitalized children. This outlook influenced patient care, and parental visits were often limited. The push toward family-centered care came in the 1980s, after prior research showed the importance of family in the care of hospitalized children. Miles focused her research on the stress experienced by parents when their child is in the ICU and the psychosocial needs of families. She developed the Parental Stressor Scale: Neonatal Intensive Care Unit (PSS: NICU) and PSS: Pediatric Intensive Care Unit (PSS: PICU) scales which are still used internationally to identify issues and develop interventions to help families and their children.

Famous for her work on bereavement, Miles authored The Grief of Parents When a Child Dies, the only publication that Compassionate Friends, Inc. distributes nationwide to bereaved parents, with tens of thousands of copies sold and hundreds of thousands reached through social media and websites.

With a $1.5 million grant from the National Institute of Mental Health, Miles paired with researchers at Duke University's department of pediatric infectious diseases to investigate how parental care impacts the development of infants born to HIV-infected mothers.

Miles became the founding president of the Society of Pediatric Nurses (SPN) from 1990 to 1992. This organizational body provides educational opportunities, creates standards of care, increases research options, and generates a network of communication for the pediatric nursing field.

== Awards ==
- 1972 - Honor's Day Award, University of Missouri-Kansas City
- 1976 - Boston College Bicentennial President Award, Alumni Department
- 1980 - American Nurses Foundation Nursing '80 Scholar
- 1982 - Fellow, American Academy of Nursing
- 1983 - Research Achievement Award, University of Kansas
- 1985 - Compassionate Friends Appreciation Award
- 1993 - Mercy Hospital School of Nursing, Centennial Anniversary Alumni Award for Excellence in Education
- 1993 - North Carolina Nurses Association, Nurse Researcher of the Year
- 1994 - Boston College, Alumni Award for Excellence in Education
- 1997 - Society of Pediatric Nurses, Educator of the Year Award
- 1999 - Certificate of Merit, Friends of National Institute of Nursing Research
- 2000 - D. Jean Wood Award, Southern Nursing Research Society
- 2003 - Alumni of the Year Award, School of Nursing, University of Pittsburgh
- 2006 - Society of Pediatric Nurses, Distinguished Service Award
- 2008 - Margaret Shandor Miles Maternal Child Poster Award for students, Southern Nursing Research Society
- 2012 - Leading in Nursing Research Award, Southern Nursing Research Society
- 2013 - Living Legend in Nursing, American Academy of Nursing

== Personal life ==
Miles was married to Lewis M. Miles (died April 5, 2011), with whom she had a daughter, Aimee Eckler.
