= Anguish (disambiguation) =

Anguish refers to extreme pain, distress or anxiety.

Anguish may also refer to:

- Anguish (1917 film), a French silent film
- Anguish (1947 film), a Spanish crime film
- Anguish (1987 film), a Spanish-produced horror film
- Anguish (2015 film), an American horror film
- Anguish, the most famous painting of painter August Friedrich Schenck
