= Carmen Messerlian =

Canadian reproductive and environmental epidemiologist

- Education: McGill University (BSc, PhD); London School of Hygiene & Tropical Medicine (MSc)
- Known for: Research on environmental and chemical exposures affecting fertility, pregnancy, and child health
- Scientific career
- Fields: Reproductive epidemiology Environmental epidemiology
- Workplaces: Harvard T.H. Chan School of Public Health; Massachusetts General Hospital
- Website: https://vie.science/

Carmen Messerlian is a Canadian-born reproductive and environmental epidemiologist. Her research focuses on environmental and biological factors that affect fertility, pregnancy, and child health. She has held academic appointments at Harvard University and McGill University.

== Education ==
Messerlian earned a Bachelor of Science in nursing and a Doctor of Philosophy in Epidemiology from McGill University, and a Master of Science in Public Health from the London School of Hygiene & Tropical Medicine. She held a professional nursing license from the Ordre des infirmières et infirmiers du Québec between 1997 and 2022.

== Career ==
Messerlian was a postdoctoral scholar and research scientist at Harvard University. Between 2019 and 2025, she served as a professor in the Departments of Epidemiology and Environmental Health at the Harvard T.H. Chan School of Public Health, and held a joint appointment in the Department of Obstetrics and Gynecology at Massachusetts General Hospital.

Her work examines how the environmental exposures and lifestyle factors influence reproductive and generational health. She has studied the role of endocrine-disrupting chemicals, including phthalates and per- and polyfluoroalkyl substances (PFAS), in fertility and pregnancy outcomes. Messerlian has also participated in research collaborations involving the National Institutes of Health (NIH), Massachusetts Institute of Technology (MIT), and other institutions.

She has served on advisory committees related to environmental health, including the Science Advisory Committee on Chemicals under the U.S. Environmental Protection Agency.

== Selected publications ==
- Messerlian, C. (2022). An ounce of prevention is worth a pound of cure: time to focus on preconception workplace reproductive health. Human Reproduction, 37(1), 1–3.
- Messerlian, C. (2021). An ounce of prevention is worth a pound of cure: time to focus on preconception workplace reproductive health. Human Reproduction, 37(1), 142–151.
- Messerlian, C., et al. (2024). Predictors of serum per- and polyfluoroalkyl substances concentrations among U.S. couples attending a fertility clinic. Environmental Health Perspectives.
- Messerlian, C., et al. (2024). Maternal and paternal preconception serum concentrations of per- and polyfluoroalkyl substances in relation to birth outcomes. Environmental Health Perspectives.
