= Anguish =

Extreme sadness

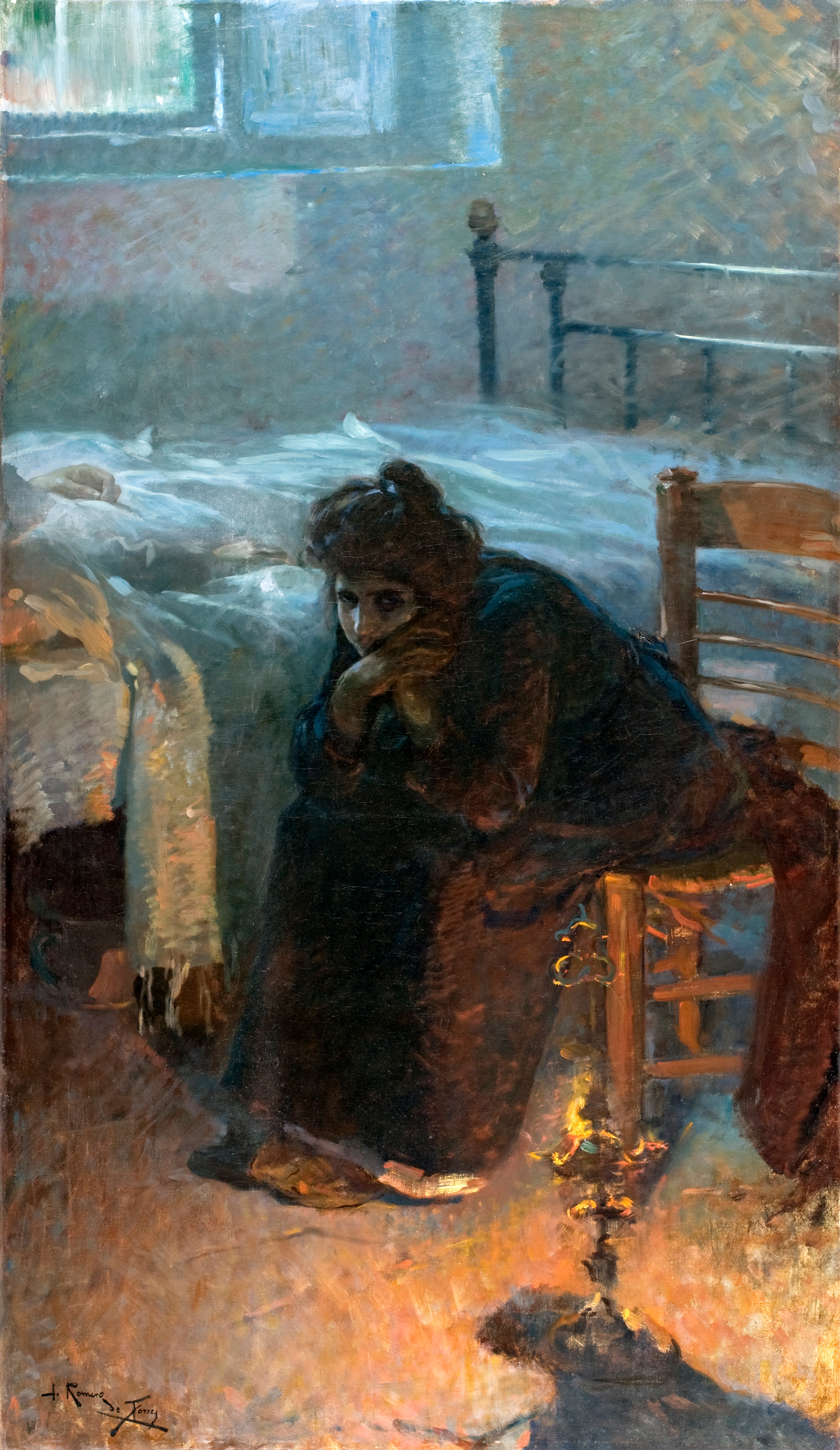
"Hours of anguish" (Julio Romero de Torres, 1904)

Anguish (from the Latin angustia "distress") is "extreme unhappiness caused by physical or mental suffering". The feeling of anguish is typically preceded by a tragedy or event that has a profound meaning to the being in question. Anguish can be felt physically or mentally (often referred to as emotional distress).

Anguish is also a term used in philosophy, often as a synonym for angst. It is a paramount feature of existentialist philosophy, in which anguish is often understood as the experience of an utterly free being in a world with zero absolutes (existential despair). In the theology of Søren Kierkegaard, it refers to a being with total free will who is in a constant state of spiritual fear in the face of their unlimited freedom.

== Mental health ==
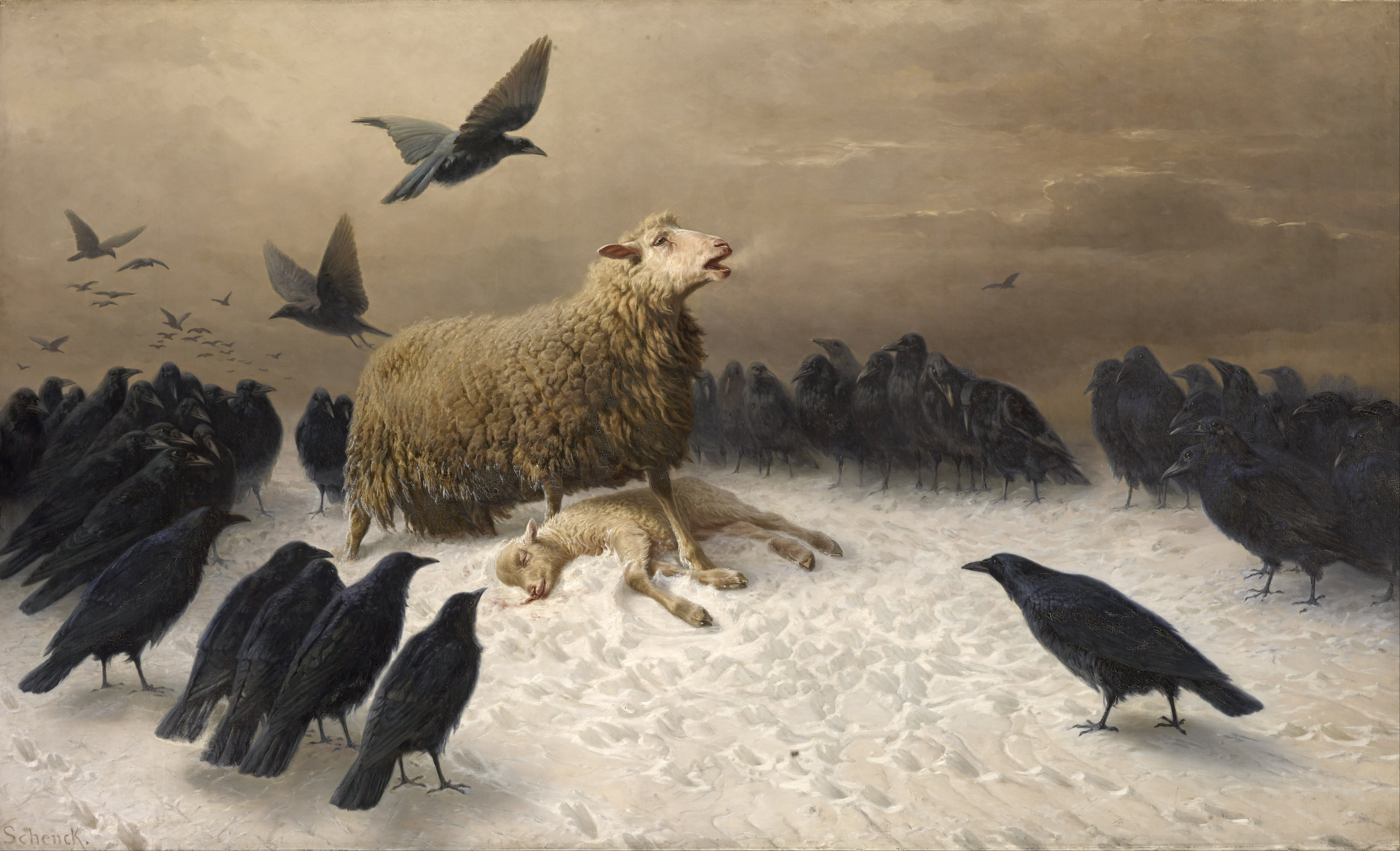
Anguish by August Friedrich Schenck, 1878, National Gallery of Victoria

Anguish is made up of fear, distress, anxiety and panic. These stressors cause an enormous amount of dissonance, which could then lead to issues of mental health. While taken literally anguish may be defined as a physical event, but it may be extrapolated to an event of one’s psyche. It has been found that the anguish of a significant change in the way a young student lives (i.e. their new responsibilities, being on their own, multiple deadlines etc.) has contributed to significantly increased rates of college students with anxiety and depression.

== Philosophy ==
- Kierkegaard views anguish as the same as suffering. Everyone wants to find the "truth" but it takes anguish and suffering to "appropriate" the truth. Kierkegaard put it this way in 1847 and 1850.
  All the knowledge allied with inquisitiveness, thirst for knowledge, natural talent, the self-seeking passion, all the knowledge the natural man promptly understands to be worth learning is also basically and essentially easy to learn, and aptitude is involved here from first to last. Therefore people are willing enough to learn when it is a matter of learning more, but when it is a matter of learning anew through sufferings, then learning becomes hard and heavy, then aptitude does not help, but on the other hand no one is excluded even though he is ever so lacking in aptitude. The lowliest, the simplest, the most forsaken human being, someone whom all teachers give up but heaven has by no means given up-he can learn obedience fully as well as anyone else.
  — Søren Kierkegaard, Upbuilding Discourses in Various Spirits, 1847, Hong translation, pp. 252–253
  Is “truth” the sort of thing one might conceivably appropriate without more ado by means of another man? Without more ado-that is without being willing to be developed and tried, to fight and to suffer, just as he did who acquired the truth for himself? Is not that as impossible as to sleep or dream oneself into the truth. Is it not just as impossible to appropriate it thus without more ado however wide awake one might be? Or is one really wide awake, is not this a vain conceit, when one does not understand or will not understand that with respect to the truth there is no shortcut which dispenses with the necessity of acquiring it, and with that respect to acquire it from generation to generation there is no essential shortcut, so that every generation and every individual in the generation must essentially begin again from the start?
  — Søren Kierkegaard, Training in Christianity, 1850, pp. 181–182; Lowrie translation 1941, 2004
- Friedrich Nietzsche saw a new form of anguish emerging from secularisation’s erosion of any moral absolute, producing thereby what he ironically called “The advantages of our times: nothing is true, everything is permitted”.
- Jean-Paul Sartre saw anguish as the product of man’s existential freedom, liable to manifest itself whenever a decision has to be made: thus when walking along a cliff, you might feel anguish to know that you have the freedom to throw yourself down to your imminent death. Sartre also saw the routines of everyday life as serving as “banisters” against existential despair: “guardrails against anguish”: alarm clocks...signposts, tax forms, policemen’.

== Anguish and the trolley problem ==
A study done at the University of Princeton’s Center for the Study of Brain, Mind, and Behavior suggests that the presence of the emotion influences the decisions made. The study uses a functional magnetic resonance imaging machine to measure the brain waves of a subject when put into a difficult position. In this particular session, the subject was presented with a situation where she had to decide the fate of five people versus one person by the flip of a switch, and then decide the fate of five people versus one person by the physical acting of condemning a man to his death. The results of the fMRI stated that the decision of death by switch was easier than the decision of physically pushing a man to his death. It is theorized that the participant is being subjected to the emotion of anguish when faced with future possibility of physical condemning another person and therefore the brain enforces an “emotional block” to encourage the cessation of this behavior.

== Music ==
Music has a particular way of eliciting emotions into its listeners. Hearing a song, symphony, or sonnet filled with anguish, one might begin to reflect upon their own life and experiences that coincide with the notes, thereby bringing repressed memories beyond subconscious to our salient mind.

== See also ==
- Dark romanticism
- Guernica
- Limit-experience
- Marsyas
- The Scream
- Suffering
- Psychological pain
