= Intuitive–instrumental grief =

Intuitive grief and instrumental grief are two patterns of grieving styles identified by psychologists Terry Martin and Kenneth Doka.

Intuitive and instrumental grief describes two ends of a grieving scale. Individuals who exhibit more qualities of the intuitive grieving style are called intuitive grievers. Individuals who exhibit more qualities of the instrumental grieving style are called instrumental grievers.

Common qualities of intuitive grieving are: an internal experience characterized by extreme sadness and pain as well as an outward experience characterized by emotional expression (ex: tears). Common qualities of instrumental grieving are: an internal experience characterized by mental separation from the loss as well as an outward experience characterized by lack of emotion.

Identification of an individual's particular style of grieving is important because an individual's particular style of grieving helps in creating an adequate treatment plan to assist the individual in coping with his or her loss.

== Intuitive grief ==
Individuals who experience more qualities related to the intuitive grieving style experience and express their grief primarily through affect. Intuitive grievers develop more extreme emotional symptoms and cope with their loss mainly by sharing their feelings with others. These individuals are more likely to seek and/or accept community support through events such as self-help groups or one-on-one grief therapy.

== Instrumental grief ==
Individuals who experience more qualities related to the instrumental grieving style are less likely to express emotion and often desire to rather master their feelings developed from the loss as well as master their surrounding environment. These individuals are marked by a more cognitive, problem-solving approach and are more likely to direct their energy into activities. Though instrumental grievers perceive loss more as a challenge to overcome rather than a threat, anger is usually the most readily expressed feeling.

== Blended grief ==
Intuitive and instrumental grieving are two extreme styles of grieving located on a continuum. Because of this, it is rare to find people who belong purely to one style of a grieving pattern.

The middle area between extreme intuitive grieving and extreme instrumental grieving is called blended grieving. People who exhibit qualities of both the intuitive grieving style as well as the instrumental grieving style are identified as blended grievers. Through blended grieving, a person naturally expresses grief in both cognitive (instrumental) and affective (intuitive) ways, however one style of grief is usually more dominant than the other.

== Gender bias ==
Martin and Doka's first work on intuitive and instrumental grieving in 1996 emphasized “masculine” and “feminine” grief. Many of Martin and Doka's readers began confusing the masculine and feminine identification of grieving styles with male and female gender association. Intuitive and instrumental grieving patterns have been found to be gender related, however are not gender determined therefore “masculine” grieving was renamed to “instrumental” while “feminine” grieving was renamed to “intuitive”.

The assumption that males are supposed to grieve through instrumental ways and that females are supposed to grieve through intuitive ways is related to male and female sex roles that are taught and reinforced within a person's culture. Traditionally, men have been raised to be more decisive, strong, successful and inexpressive which tends to lead males to be more private, intellectual and introspective in their grief; certain qualities associated with the instrumental grieving style.

In addition, women have traditionally been raised to be more passive, dependent and emotionally expressive than males which tends to lead women to act as such in times of grief; aspects associated with the intuitive grieving style. Though there is correlation between gender and style of grieving, no pairing of gender and styles of grieving is right or wrong just as no particular style of grieving in general is right or wrong for an individual.
