= Family-centered care =

Model of care for children and families

Family-centered care or Relationship-Centered Care is one of four approaches that provides an expanded view of how to work with children and families. Family-centered service is made up of a set of values, attitudes, and approaches to services for children with special needs and their families. In some family-centered settings such as the Hasbro Children's Partial Hospital Program, medical and psychiatric services are integrated to help teach parents and children methods to treat illness and disease. Family-centered service recognizes that each family is unique; that the family is the constant in the child's life; and that they are the experts on the child's abilities and needs. The family works with service providers to make informed decisions about the services and supports the child and family receive. In family-centered service, the strengths and needs of all family members are considered.

Family-centered service reflects a shift from the traditional focus on the biomedical aspects of a child's condition to a concern with seeing the child in context of their family and recognizing the primacy of family in the child's life. The principles argue in favor of an approach that respects families as integral and coequal parts of the health care team. This approach is expected to improve the quality and safety of a patient's care by helping to foster communication between families and health care professionals. Furthermore, by taking family/patient input and concerns into account, the family feels comfortable working with professionals on a plan of care, and professionals are "on board" in terms of what families expect with medical interventions and health outcomes. In some health systems, patients and family members serve as advisers to the hospital in order to provide input that can lead to general quality improvement efforts. Family-centered approaches to health care intervention also generally lead to wiser allocation of health care resources, as well as greater patient and family satisfaction.

== Family ==
"Family" means any person(s) who plays a significant role in an individual's life. This may include a person(s) not legally related to the individual who act as advocates. Members of "family" include spouses, domestic partners, and both different-sex and same-sex significant others. "Family" includes a minor patient's parent or parents, regardless of the gender of either parent. Solely for purposes of visitation policy, the concept of parenthood is to be liberally construed without limitation as encompassing legal parents, foster parents, same-sex parent, stepparents, those serving in loco parentis (in place of the parent), and other persons operating in caretaker roles.

This definition of family was developed in consultation with the Healthcare Equality Index Advisory Council, Gay and Lesbian Medical Association and Joint Commission staff members. Like the majority of the definitions of "family" contained in submitted hospital policy, this definition establishes a broad and encompassing concept of family. The specifically enumerated members of family provide guidance to staff and prevent biased interpretation to the contrary. The concept of "domestic partners" contained in this definition encompasses not only domestic partnerships, but all legally recognized same-sex relationships, including civil unions and reciprocal beneficiary arrangements. The definition also focuses on a functional definition of parenthood as established by the individual's role as caretaker of a minor child. This is designed to ensure visitor access for the individuals most responsible for the care of a minor patient, even if this caretaker relationship lacks formal recognition under applicable state law.

This definition of "family" places hospital personnel on notice as to the unique nature of parenthood in the visitation context. While the definition requires that caretaker-individuals be granted access to visit minor patients, this caretaker status does not necessarily carry with it the rights that accompany legal parental status. For instance, applicable state law may dictate that only a biological or custodial parent may determine the course of medical care for a minor child.

== Role of the family ==
While specific methods of implementing family-centered care approach differs from facility to facility, procedures are fairly similar. On admission, the patient usually designates one or two people who will serve as their primary "care partners". The admitting staff discuss the reasons for admission with the patient and their "care partners" and what health criteria are required for the patient's discharge.

"Care partners" are then intricately involved with the patient's care by their entire attending healthcare team, including physicians, nurses, nutritionists, social workers, and more. At every stage, "care partners" and patients discuss with healthcare professionals test results, the state of the patient's current health, what type of things to expect throughout the day, and discharge goals. "Care partners" are invited to take part in nursing interventions, including bathing, feeding, helping the nursing staff with moving the patient, and assisting the patient in exercising or moving about the unit. "Care partners" are also invited to take an active role in "rounds," providing feedback and asking questions reflective of theirs and the patient's wishes or concerns.

"Care partners" are also indoctrinated on various elements of hospital operating policy, such as quiet time and visitation rules. The "care partners" are then generally allowed to manage the adherence to these policies in a manner conducive to the patient's healing and common sense—for example, by managing how many visitors are present in the patient's room.

== Advantages and disadvantages ==
Family-centered care emerged as an important concept in health care at the end of the 20th century; but the implementation of family-centered care was met with a variety of snags. Prior to the early 1990s, the relationship between care providers and patients was distant. The traditional model of care centered on physicians, and an expectation that patients and their families would assume a passive role as an observer, rather than a participant. Healing was treated largely as an abstract or business-like affair. Special requests by the patient were seen as interfering with the provision of their care or even as being a detriment to their health. Modern ideas like open visitation or care partners were almost unheard of and were generally dismissed as impossible to accomplish. This was compounded by the implementation of Health Maintenance Organizations, which successfully reined in the rising healthcare costs of the 1970s at the cost of the patient-healthcare worker relationship.

Much of the early work on family-centered care emerged from the pediatric and geriatric medicine fields; for example, as research came to light about the effects of separating hospitalized children from their families, many healthcare institutions began to adopt policies that welcomed family members to be with their child around the clock. As awareness increased of the importance of meeting the psychosocial and holistic needs of not only children, but all patients, the family-centered care model began to make serious headway as a credible intervention model. In the United States, this was further encouraged by Federal legislation in the late 1980s and early 1990s that provided additional validation on the importance of family-centered principles.

Beginning in the mid-1990s (although elements of family-centered care had begun appearing in the early 1980s), however, this situation began to change. Studies began to show that many of the supposed detriments to family-centered care were negligible, not supported by research, or untrue. A study conducted in 2001 showed that open visitation had little to no effect on physiologic parameters such as heart rate, blood pressure, respiratory rate, cardiac arrhythmias, and intercranial pressure. Indeed, evidence suggested anxiety levels and general cardiovascular health were positively affected after the implementation of family-centered care, leading to fewer medical interventions being required (physical or chemical therapies in particular). Another area of concern, septic and infection control, found that as long as a patient's visitors were educated in the proper aseptic procedure (such as hand washing and use of handsanitizer gel), infection control outcomes were not negatively affected by unrestricted visitation.

Patient care was also positively affected. In one study, it was found that patients receiving family-centered care were far more likely to have met the criteria of medical and nursing care plans (such as drinking x amount of fluids every eight hours, moving from NP suctioning to bulb suctioning, or the measurement of patient's intake/output), as the patient's family took it upon themselves to encourage or assist the patient in accomplishing these goals. Family and close friends were more likely to identify slight variations in the patient's mental or physical health that health care professionals largely unfamiliar with the patient may miss. Furthermore, while health care professionals are very talented at their work, their jobs are generally limited by the walls of the health care facility, whereas a patient's family is not. Enlisting a patient's family as a part of their health care team helps enable their ability to assist, manage, and assess the patient's healing after their discharge from a health care facility.

A study undertaken at the University of Virginia's Children's Hospital showed that sharing information and involving family in a patient's care (via the family-centered care model described previously) had the following effects:

- A rise in staff satisfaction due to reduced phone calls by security at night;
- Improved consistency of information given to family members;
- A decrease in clinical workload; and
- A significant rise in patient satisfaction scores on the Press-Ganey scale in the areas of Accommodations and Comfort of Visitors (93 to 98), Information Provided to Family (87 to 99), Staff Attitudes Towards Visitors (62 to 75), and Safety and Security Felt at the Hospital (86 to 88)

A study conducted at eight hospitals demonstrated that implementing family-centered rounds, an intervention to standardize communication between families and healthcare providers, reduced the rate of harmful medical errors.

A research study published in Denmark in 2015, examined the effect of nursing support on parents of children admitted to the Pediatric Intensive Care Unit. The study resulted in an increased satisfaction from parents of the support provided by nurses who were trained with the NPST, the Nurse Parent Support Tool manual. This tool was created by Dr. Margaret Miles, a pioneer in family-centered care and pediatric nursing. This tool, along with many others created to assess parental stress when their child was sick, helped to reform the field and improve clinical practice.

== See also ==
- Nursing care plan
- Health promotion
