= The Grief Recovery Institute =

Organization in Athol, Idaho, United States

Coordinates: 44.05001°N 121.32283°W

Grief Recovery Institute
- Type: S-Corporation
- Established: 1977
- President: Cole W James
- Location: Coeur d'Alene, Idaho
- Website: http://www.griefrecoverymethod.com

Grief Recovery Institute is an organization specializing in helping people with grief issues using The Grief Recovery Method. The organization is headquartered in Athol, Idaho with locations in Sweden, Australia, Mexico, and Hungary. Its mission focuses on disseminating information about grief and the possibility of recovery from the impact of death, divorce, and other significant emotional losses.

Members of the Institute have appeared on CNN and other broadcast networks to help people understand emotional responses to national and international grief events – notably, in the aftermath of the September 11 attacks in 2001; when Andrea Yates drowned her five children; and during the Ronald Reagan memorial week. They have also conducted hundreds of print and radio interviews relative to chronicling events like the death of Princess Diana and other celebrities; plane crashes; and natural disasters.

The organization donated 1500 copies of James and Friedman's books, The Grief Recovery Handbook and When Children Grieve, to the families directly affected by the 9/11 attacks, and donated 2500 copies of When Children Grieve to the school districts in Texas, Mississippi, and Louisiana that took in thousands of children displaced by Hurricanes Katrina and Rita.

The institute also trains and certifies mental and medical health professionals, funeral directors, clergy, and others in the application of the principles and actions of The Grief Recovery Method to help grieving people. After completing the training, Grief Recovery Specialists are able to take groups of individuals through an 8-week outreach program. More than 500,000 people have completed the program.

== See also ==
- Grief counseling
- Support group
- List of counseling topics
