= Pediatric nursing =

Nursing involving children

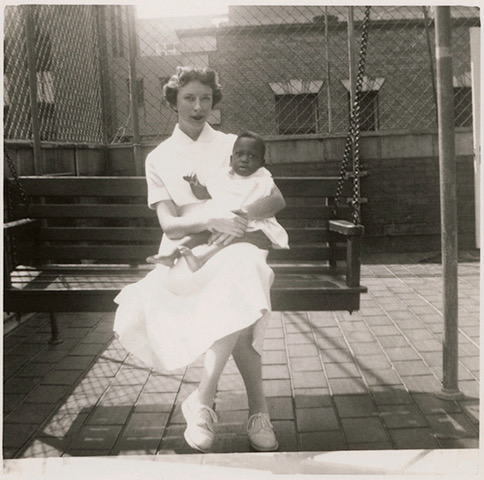
Registered Nurse at Jefferson Medical College Hospital 1952

Pediatric nursing is part of the nursing profession, specifically revolving around the care of neonates and children up to adolescence. The word pediatrics comes from the Greek words 'paedia' (child) and 'iatrike' (physician). 'Paediatrics' is the British/Australian spelling, while 'pediatrics' is the American spelling.

== Disciplines ==
=== Direct nursing ===
Nursing functions vary regionally, by individual education, experience, and individual career goals. These functions include the administration of procedures and medicines according to prescribed nursing care plans. Nurses observe vital signs and develop communication skills with children and family members, as well as with other medical personnel. Awareness of the concerns of children and parents, physical presence at times of stress, and helping children and family members cope are common functions of direct nursing care

=== Neonatal nursing ===
Neonatal nurses specialize in working with the youngest patients(infants). Neonatal nursing focuses on providing care and support for newborn babies delivered prematurely or who are suffering from health problems such as birth defects, infections, or heart deformities. Many neonatal nurses work in a Neonatal Intensive Care Unit (NICU) providing specialized medical care to at-risk newborns.

A dysmature newborn "is one whose developmental level is poor at birth. These newborns require a special type of care, due to their health issues, such as:

- Inadequate respiratory function
- Poor control of body temperature
- Increased tendency to bleed
- Poor resistance to infection
- Poor nutrition
- Immature kidneys and skin
- Jaundice

Neonatal nurses employ medical techniques, including the use of incubators. Essentially, the incubator "provide[s] proper heat, humidity, oxygen, and mist... and protection from infection." The medical apparatus provides essential medical care for at-risk newborns.

=== Challenges of Pediatric Emergency Rooms ===
The pediatric emergency unit is a critical care environment. Which can often be a place where family struggle being when it's perceived as impersonal, restrictions on children's daily activities, and the feeling of not being normal. This makes the experience more challenging for both children and healthcare providers as it's hard to compensate for all patients' needs and provide a welcoming and comfortable environment while in care. Sometimes it's easy for momentary, lasting threats to patients when their overall needs aren't met. Having clear communication between nursing staff and caregivers can promote a relationship of empathy, support, and trust, which can be essential for a sense of comfort and bond between workers. More so a way to reduce the fear and anxiety in pediatric patients and caregivers, making emergency care less traumatic.

=== Emergency nursing ===
Pediatric nurses are expected to provide a quick response to stressful circumstances in life-threatening situations. Key features of pediatric emergency nursing include:

- Handling multifaceted trauma, injury or illness cases without letting the patients succumb to the urgency of the situation
- Stabilizing patients
- Quickly diagnosing conditions and providing on-spot solutions
- Administering appropriate medications to address pain
- Upgrading skills and knowledge
- Remaining patient and caring for the traumatized families accompanying the patient
- Maintaining equanimity around patients who do not improve.

=== Education ===
Pediatric nursing requires an understanding of child development family-centered care, and acute and chronic pediatric health conditions. Nursing education has evolved significantly in response to advances in health care, a change in care delivery models, and increased pediatric-specific education opportunities.

=== Pediatric/ Psychiatric practitioners ===
A Pediatric nurse practitioner must attend school for at least two years after earning a bachelor's degree, pass an examination, and apply to their state board of nursing.Some pediatric nurses can choose to return to school for their master's in psychiatric nursing. Pediatric psychiatric nurses are responsible for caring for children and adolescents with psychiatric problems.

=== Technology Advancement ===
In the 1970s, there was a rapid acceleration in the advancement of medical technologies. The advancements were seen in nursing professions, including pediatrics, as well as other specialties. The field of pediatric nursing has revolutionized with the invention of new resources and tools. Nursing programs evolved to include training on these new technologies to prepare nursing students for a realistic work environment.

=== Sickness Development ===
Despite the number of advances in pediatric health care. There is an increased number of children with chronic illnesses. For example, Acute infections, COVID-19, respiratory syncytial virus (RSV), influenza, and so many more illnesses are leading causes of hospitalization in children as well as adolescents. Other illnesses in children and adolescents that have become more prevalent over the years include obesity, diabetes, and mental health issues. Increased natural disasters, pollution, climate change, and poor air quality may also contribute to neuro-developmental disorders and infectious diseases.

== Goals ==
- Normalize the life of the child during hospitalization.
- Minimize the impact of the child's unique condition.
- Foster growth and development.
- Develop realistic, functional and coordinated home care plans.
- Respect the roles of the families.
- Prevent disease and promote health.

== Training ==
=== Australia ===
A registered nursing license is required to practice. A registered nurse requires a Bachelor of Science (Nursing), a 3–4 year full-time training. Once completed 12–18 months in a clinical setting is required, followed by completing a graduate certificate in pediatric nursing.

=== United States ===
The CPN (certified pediatric nurse) exam validates knowledge and expertise beyond the prerequisite Registered Nurse (RN) licensure. Eligible RNs may have a diploma, associate's degree, BSN, MSN, or higher nursing degree and must have a minimum of 1800 hours of pediatric nursing experience. Over 30,000 nurses actively held CPN certification as of April 15, 2021.

Training involves a mix of formal education and clinical experiences. Pediatric nurses can become certified in the field and may choose to further specialize. Students can enroll in an associate or bachelor's degree program. Some diploma programs offered exclusively through hospitals may also prepare students for the RN exam.

=== Spain ===
Pediatric nursing in Spain is uneven, with some regions offering more training, jobs and education than others. Many regions in Spain have yet to make pediatric nursing a specialty. Some regions that have yet to implement this specialty are "Catalonia and the Basque Country". Many areas have implemented this specialty such as "Galicia, Madrid, and Murcia" giving training and workplace opportunities from “2010 to 2024, 2312 places” were offered; however they were unevenly distributed throughout communities, which created an uneven access to training. There are issues in some areas where the demand of pediatric nurses is super high due to the number of children, and they don't have this specialty or any training positions this includes "Cataluña and Navarra".

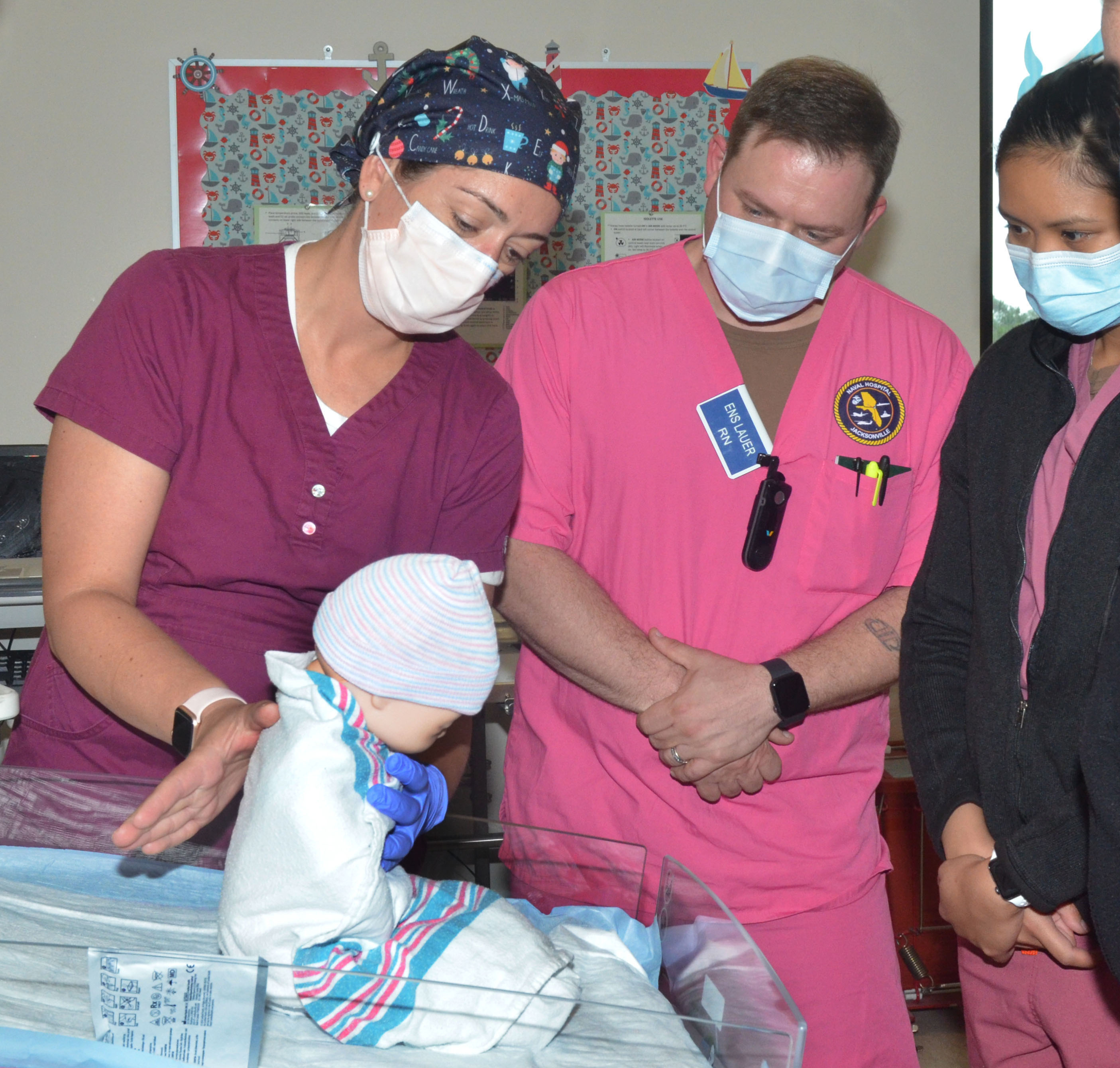
this image is of three pediatric nurses in training learning by using a dummy baby. at JACKSONVILLE, Fla. (Dec. 20, 2021)

== Global development ==
=== Southern and eastern Africa ===
Strengthening the pediatric nursing workforce has been recommended as a primary strategy to reduce under-five mortality in African nations. Children make up close to half the population in many African countries, but research suggests that children's nurses often make up less than 1% of the nursing workforce: a 2019 workforce survey found approximately 4,000 qualified children's nurses in South Africa, Uganda, Zambia, Malawi and Kenya. The majority (8/10) were in South Africa.

=== Korea ===
Pediatric nursing like other specialties has to deal with trauma-informed care (TIC). There are so many reasons that can cause a child to experience trauma such as abuse, major injury, illness and much more. In Korea there is a study on how well (TIC) care is working and implemented in hospitals in Korea. Situations such as explaining when a child may die or how a trauma may affect a child as they get older. As well as not feeling confident in how to talk to the patient when involving (TIC) such as “parent's questions about whether the child is going to die or understanding how traumatic stress may present differently according to developmental stages.” This shows they need more support and training.

=== Digitalization of pediatric nursing ===
Activities in pediatric nursing can increasingly be supported by digitalization. Smart assistance systems, robotics, and AI-powered decision support are increasingly being used in pediatric nursing. Other innovations such as electronic documentation and telemedicine solutions are also being used more frequently.

== Career overview ==
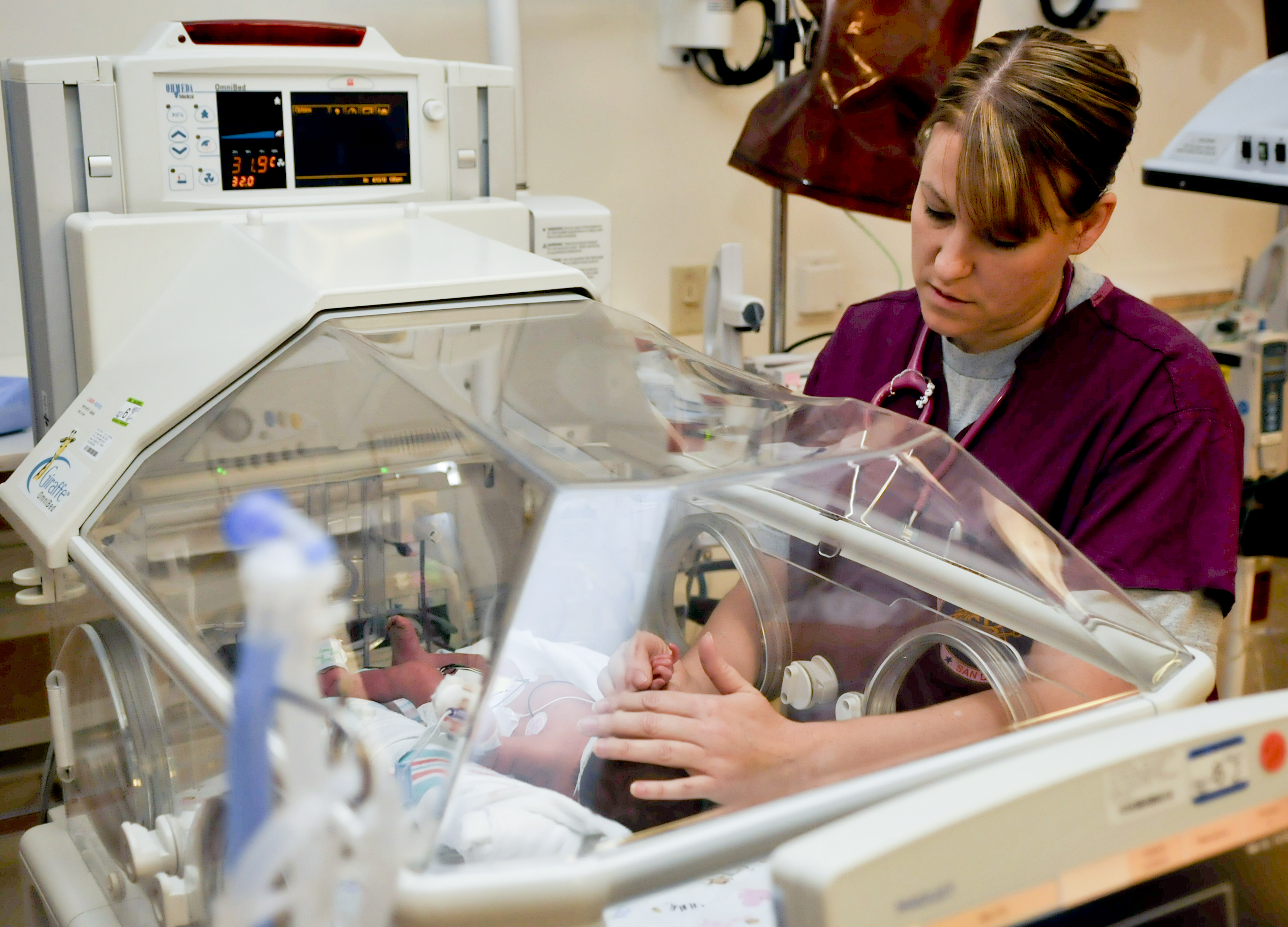
Examining a newborn baby

Pediatric nurses work in settings including doctors' offices and community-based settings, as well as hospitals and critical care facilities. Pediatric nurses may assist pediatricians or work alongside them. Pediatric nurses offer primary care services such as diagnosing and treating common childhood illnesses and conducting developmental screenings. Acute care and specialty services are also available for the chronically ill. Some pediatric nurses and nurse practitioners specialize in areas such as cardiology, dermatology, gastroenterology or oncology. Pediatric nurses are responsible for helping patients adapt to a hospital setting and preparing them for medical treatments and procedures. Nurses also coach parents to observe and wait for important signs and responses to therapies, to increase the child's comfort, and even to provide ongoing care.

=== Education ===
Pediatric nursing specialties require specialized education. Nurses must first become a registered nurse (RN), gain experience in a pediatric health care facility and then pass the Certified Pediatric Nurse (CPN) exam. If a CPN wants to become a Pediatric Nurse Practitioner, they must return to school to receive their master's. 45% of undergraduate pediatric nursing students reported a lack of student direct care clinical learning opportunities with children

=== Counseling ===
Injury-prevention strategies and anticipatory guidance are provided via counseling. Helping the child or family solve a problem is often a focus, usually provided by advanced practice nurses or other experienced nurses.

=== Advocacy ===
The effective advocate nurse must be aware of the child's and the family's needs, the family's resources, and available health care services. Nurses help reinforce families to help them make knowledgeable choices about medical services and to act in the child's best interests. Dr. Margaret Miles was a pioneer in family-centered care in pediatric nursing, considering parental stress when their child is sick.
