= T. Glen Coughlin =

American novelist

- Born: New York City, U.S.
- Education: Freeport High School; Hofstra University (BA); Columbia University (MFA)
- Occupation: Writer

T. Glen Coughlin is an American writer.

Coughlin was born in New York City and grew up in Freeport, New York. He graduated from Freeport High School in 1976 and received a BA from Hofstra University and an MFA from Columbia University. He resides in New Jersey with his family.

His first novel, The Hero of New York, was finished when he was 23 years old and explored the dark side of the middle class suburban dream. New York Times reviewer, Dennis Smith (1986) wrote, "The Hero of New York is solid tough-guy entertainment, and Mr. Coughlin's descriptions can be hilarious." Coughlin's second novel, Steady Eddie, is a coming-of-age story set in Long Island, New York in 1977. George Needham wrote "Coughlin neatly captures a person's essence in the simplest gesture, but each character is drawn with sympathy and wit, even when the characters themselves lack these attributes. A fine novel." Coughlin then switched gears and wrote his first YA novel, One Shot Away, A Wrestling Story, published by HarperCollins. Kirkis Review noted, "Coughlin's passion for knowledge of wrestling is apparent in this fast-paced, vivid narrative that is often compelling but never light." Coughlin then returned to YA wrestling and published, I LOST TO A GIRL, https://www.amazon.com/I-Lost-Girl-Wrestling-Story/dp/B08L875DPL, a novel that dives deep into the emerging sport of girl's high school wrestling. In 2025, Coughlin published his third YA wrestling novel, HEAVY, The Making of a Wrestler, https://www.amazon.com/Heavy-Wrestler-T-Glen-Coughlin-ebook/dp/B0G4SPK4SH, about 15-year-old Louis Casteel, a teen struggling with obesity and insecurity. He finds strength and purpose by joining his high school wrestling team. Overcoming family dysfunction and self-doubt, Louis learns to use his weight as an asset, turning shame into power on the mat.

Coughlin has published short stories in Doubletake Magazine, the South Dakota Review and DUCTS, an on-line magazine. His story, "The Grief Committee" was analyzed in The Politics of Mourning: Grief Management in a Cross-Cultural Fiction. Coughlin's poetry has appeared in The Dead Mule – School of Southern Literature and Hanging Moss Journal.

Novels by Coughlin:

- 1986. The Hero of New York
- 2001. Steady Eddie
- 2012. One Shot Away
- 2020. I Lost to a Girl
- 2025. HEAVY, The Making of a Wrestler
