= August Friedrich Schenck =

German-French painter (1828–1901)

- August Schenck
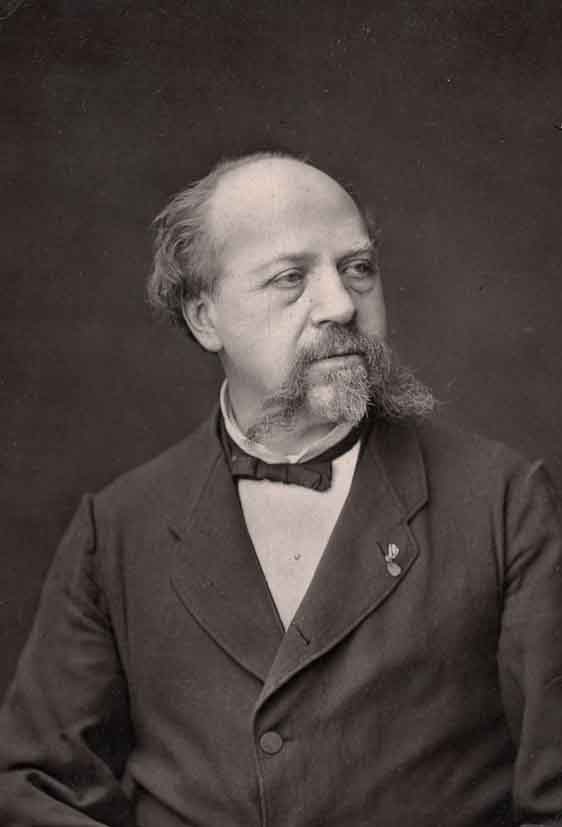
- Born: 23 April 1828; Glückstadt
- Died: 1 January 1901, 30 November 1901 (aged 72); Écouen
- Occupation: Painter
- Style: landscape painting, animal painting
- Spouse(s): Ludowika Stapaczinska

August Friedrich Albrecht Schenck (23 April 1828 – 1 January 1901) was a painter who was born in Glückstadt in the Duchy of Holstein, which at the time was under Danish control but part of the German Confederation. He lived and worked for most of his life in France. He was both French and German by nationality.

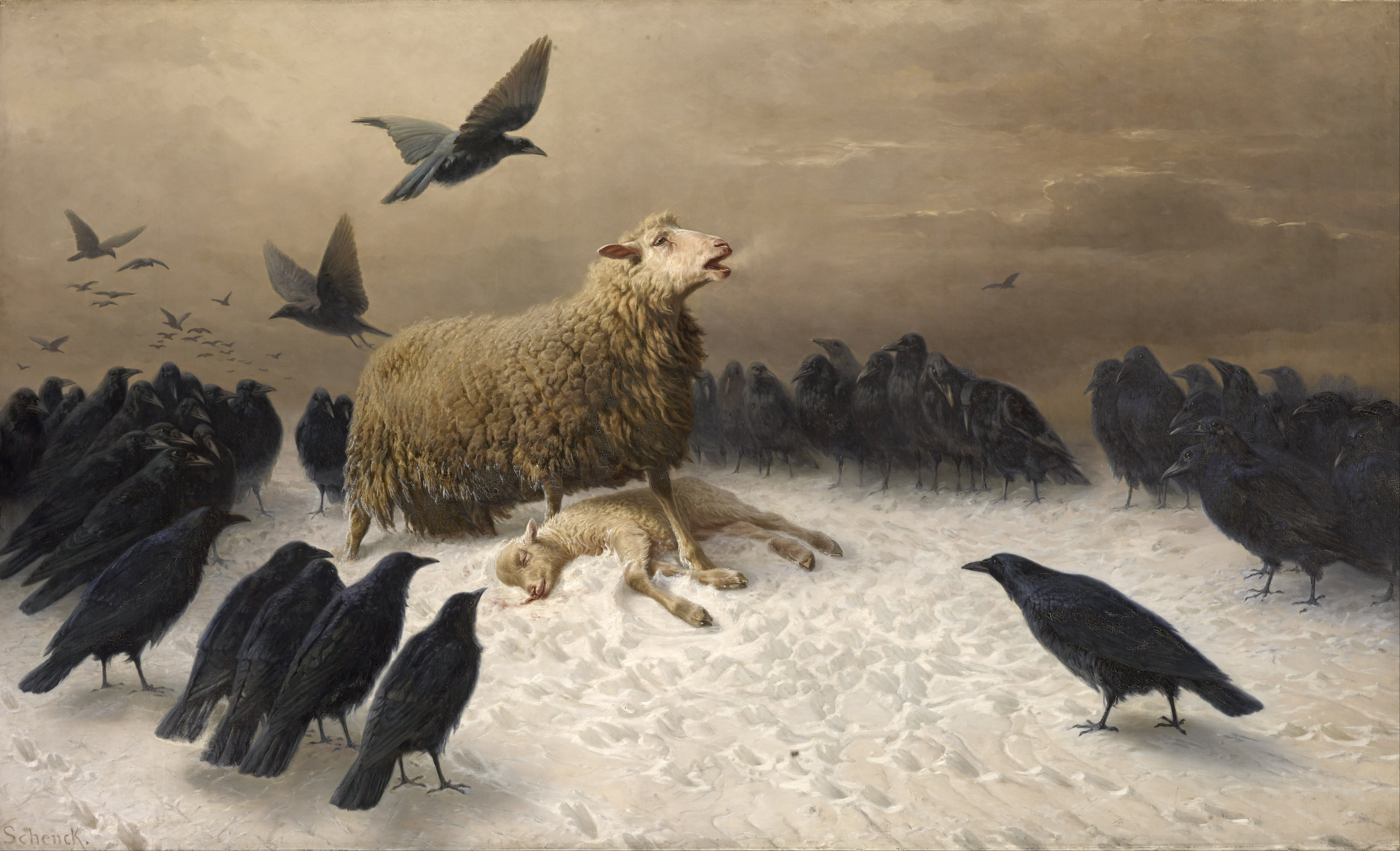
Anguish, 1878, National Gallery of Victoria

Schenck was a pupil of Léon Cogniet in France. He became well known for his landscapes and paintings of animals. His works were first exhibited publicly in 1855. Anguish, perhaps his most famous painting, is an oil-on-canvas work showing a ewe grieving over the dead body of her lamb as they are encircled by ominous black crows. It was acquired by the National Gallery of Victoria in Melbourne in 1880. In 1885 he became knight of the Legion of Honour. Schenck died in Écouen near Paris.

== Biography ==
As a young man, Schenck left Glückstadt, which was then still Danish, in order to earn a lucrative income as a "wine traveler" in Germany, Russia, and finally, Portugal. After five years he left Portugal for Paris, where he trained as a painter. He became a student of Léon Cogniet (1794–1880), a professor at the École des Beaux-Arts. Schenck then settled permanently in France.

At the age of 27, he made his debut as a painter at the World Exhibition in Paris in 1855. In 1857, he took part in the Schleswig-Holstein anniversary exhibition. A successful creative period ensued. He was particularly famous for his paintings of animals. Schenck and the French painter Rosa Bonheur (1822–1899) were the most sought-after animal painters whose works were collected internationally.

Around 1862 Schenck and his wife, Ludowika Stapaczinska, who was born in Warsaw, settled in the town of Écouen, about 20 km north of Paris. The town was known as an artist colony. The École d’Écouen attracted well-known artists, including Charles-François Daubigny, Jean-Baptiste-Camille Corot, and Mary Cassatt. There are still traces of Schenck in Écouen today: Rue de la Beauvette, on which his property that contained his house and studio was located, was renamed Rue Auguste Schenck in 1906 to honor him. His painting L’Échir hangs in the town hall, and his painting entitled, Lamb of God - Agnus dei, hangs in the church.

Schenck was known nationwide during his lifetime, when major museums acquired his works. Since then his paintings have been acquired by museums internationally. Depicted in a painting he entitled, "Lost", is a flock of sheep attended by two dogs. In the foreground the sheep are shown huddled together during a blizzard and a religious sentiment is represented in the background by a monument with a cross. The painting now hangs in the Metropolitan Museum of Art in Manhattan.

August Schenck died on 1 January 1901. His grave is in Écouen, where a road (rue Auguste Schenck) is also named after him.
