= The Compassionate Friends =

- Founded: 28 January 1969
- Type: Support Group
- Registration no.: England and Wales Charity number 1082335
- Purpose: Supporting bereaved parents & their families after a child dies
- Location: Kilburn Grange, Priory Park Road, London NW6 7UJ
- Region served: (National) 0345 123 2304 (NI) 0288 77 88 016
- Method: Voluntary mutual assistance
- Key people: Co-founder: Revd Canon Dr Simon Stephens, OBE RN; President: The Countess Mountbatten of Burma
- Revenue: £543,076 (2025-25).
- Employees: 9 (2024-25)
- Volunteers: ca 300 (2024-25)
- Website: www.tcf.org.uk

Compassionate Friends UK (TCF) is a peer support group operating in the United Kingdom. It is a registered charity formed by and for parents whose children have died, irrespective of the child's age at death and the cause of death, and is independent of any religious, philosophical or government body.

It has a national helpline and area coordinators, holds local and national meetings (including residential retreats), and operates information services including advice leaflets, a web site and a postal lending library. All TCF volunteers and most of the small permanent staff are themselves bereaved parents or siblings. TCF works to improve the treatment of bereaved parents in society by educating mental health professionals and informing the public through the publication of books, creation of news reports and dissemination of stories of individual experiences through local media.,. It also co-operates with many charities and other organisations that operate within the sphere of bereavement.

TCF volunteers facilitate local groups holding regular, free, open meetings in neutral premises. Each group follows TCF's creed, which mandates that bereaved parents, grandparents and siblings attending these meetings need not speak but are free to express their feelings. These are now supplemented by a growing programme of walks in many (often countryside) areas across the UK.

More intensive face to face events provide in-depth support. These include a programme of support days visiting cities across the country, and residential weekends run in various venues.

During the Covid-19 pandemic many local groups temporarily moved to an online format. TCF continues to develop online resources including many moderated Facebook groups and Zoom meetings, focused on groups such as fathers, siblings, and parents bereaved by suicide. Remote services enable a much wider coverage that can reach isolated individuals wherever they are.

All TCF's support to bereaved parents is delivered by volunteers, with operational and administrative support from the office staff, coordinating in-person work with remote services in a hybrid support model.

== History ==
TCF was founded in 1969 by the families of Billy Henderson and Kenneth Lawley, who both died in the Coventry and Warwickshire Hospital (now University Hospital Coventry) in May 1968. One grieving mother sent flowers to the other via the hospital chaplain, the Rev (later Canon) Simon Stephens, and the parents decided to meet to find ways to help each other survive their loss. After meeting informally they arranged a meeting with other bereaved parents in a room at the same hospital on 28 January 1969, at which the organisation was founded as The Society of the Compassionate Friends, with the help of Stephens who had by then become chaplain aboard HMS Ark Royal.

The organization expanded across the UK and abroad during the following years. The Compassionate Friends in the US developed following the publication of a story in Time Magazine in 1971 under the title "Therapeutic Friendship", describing the experience of a mother whose daughter had died from cancer. In 2012 there were about 600 chapters around the country.

Stephens was also instrumental in promoting the organisation abroad, and sister organisations were founded in Canada, Australia. and South Africa by 1990, and later on in European countries including France, Germany, Belgium and the Netherlands.

== See also ==
- Peer support
