= Anguish (Schenck) =

1878 oil painting by August Friedrich Schenck

- Angoisses (French)
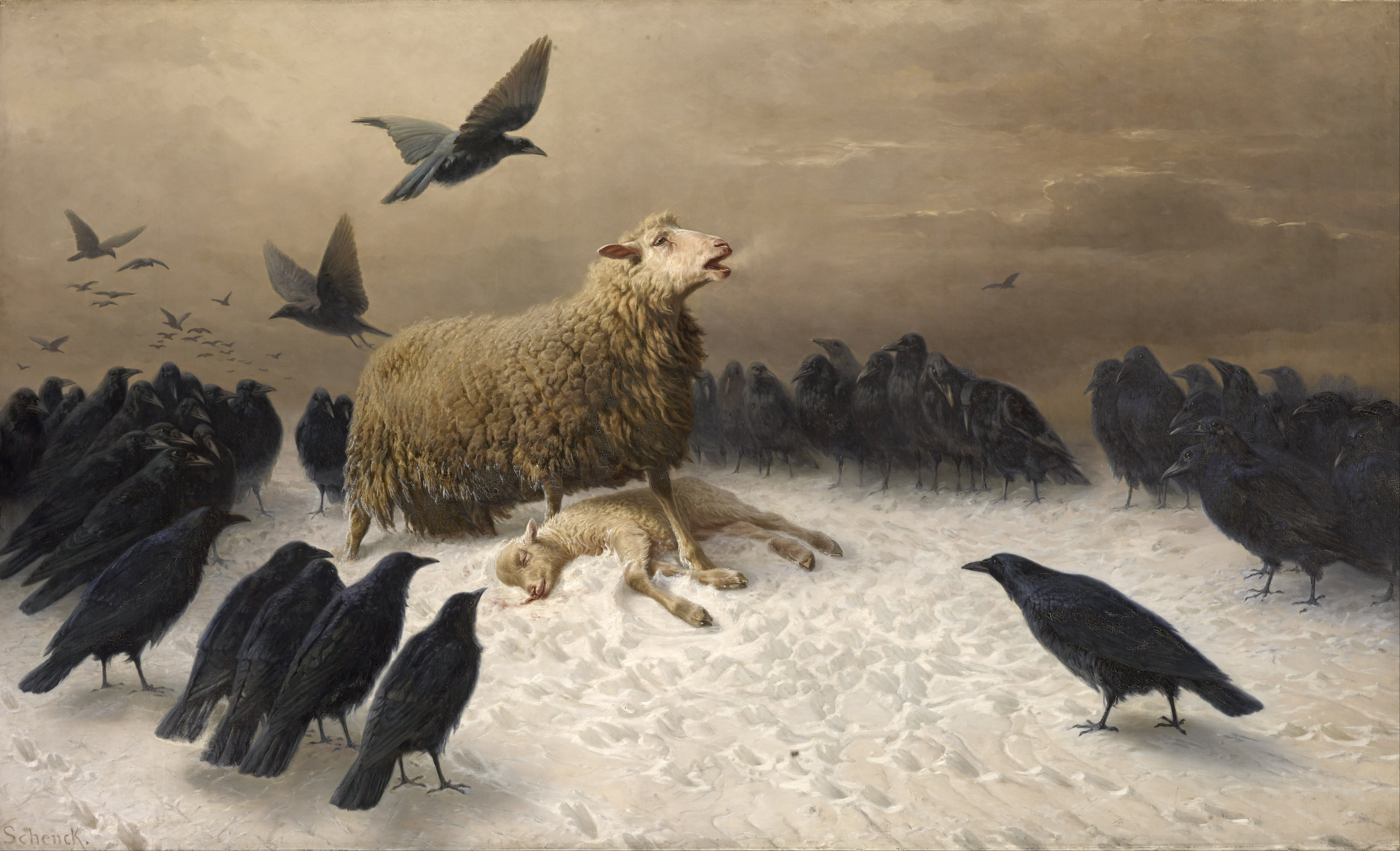
- Artist: August Friedrich Schenck
- Year: c. 1878
- Medium: Oil on canvas
- Dimensions: 151 cm × 251.2 cm (59 in × 98.9 in)
- Location: National Gallery of Victoria, Melbourne

Anguish (French: Angoisses or Angoisse) is an 1878 oil painting by August Friedrich Schenck. It depicts an anguished mother sheep standing over the dead body of her lamb, surrounded by a murder of crows. (Note: The collective name for a group of crows is a "murder".)

Perhaps Schenck's most famous painting, it is held by National Gallery of Victoria, in Melbourne, Australia since 1880. The painting was an early acquisition by the gallery, a few years after it was founded, and has been voted the most popular of the gallery's 75,000 works on two occasions, in 1906 and 2011.

== Description ==
The painting depicts a distraught ewe bleating in grief, her breath freezing in the cold air. The mother sheep is bravely and defiantly standing over the dead body of her lamb, a trickle of blood running from its mouth into the white snow, in a scene reminiscent of a pietà. The pair of sheep are encircled by a murder of black crows that crowd menacingly and ominously around under a dull grey cloudy winter sky, waiting for an opportunity to scavenge the carcass. The painting's muted tones – almost monotone shades of white, grey, brown and black – reflect its despairing subject matter. It measures 151.0 cm × 251.2 cm (59.4 in × 98.9 in) and is signed "Schenck" in the lower left corner.

Tedd Got, a senior curator at the National Gallery of Victoria, has suggested that the work may have taken inspiration from the 1872 book The Expression of the Emotions in Man and Animals, in which Charles Darwin argued emotions have biological originals, and that animals have similar emotions to humans. It has also been interpreted as a commentary on the cruelty of society, represented by the crowd of opportunistic crows.

In Anguish, Schenck metaphorically examines a broader human condition in the context of an animal painting; the ewe is given clearly recognisable human characteristics, such as determination and sorrow, so that the viewer immediately identifies with its predicament and emotions, while the sinister murder of crows also appear organised and patiently await a moment of weakness.

== History ==
Schenck was born in Glückstadt in Holstein, now in Germany but then in Denmark, and lived and worked for most of his life in France. The painting was exhibited at the Paris Salon of 1878, under its French title Angoisses, and then in London the following year. It was engraved by Charles Maurand in 1878 for the French periodical L'Art, and by Tiburce de Mare in 1879. The painting was bought by the London art dealer Agnew's and then sold to the National Gallery of Victoria. It arrived in Australia in 1880. It retains its original gilt frame.

Schenck reversed the scene in his c.1885 painting, L'Orphelin, souvenir d'Auvergne ("The Orphan, memory of Auvergne"), now held by the Musée d'Orsay, in which a lamb stands above the body of its dead mother, before a line of black crows waiting on a wooden fence.

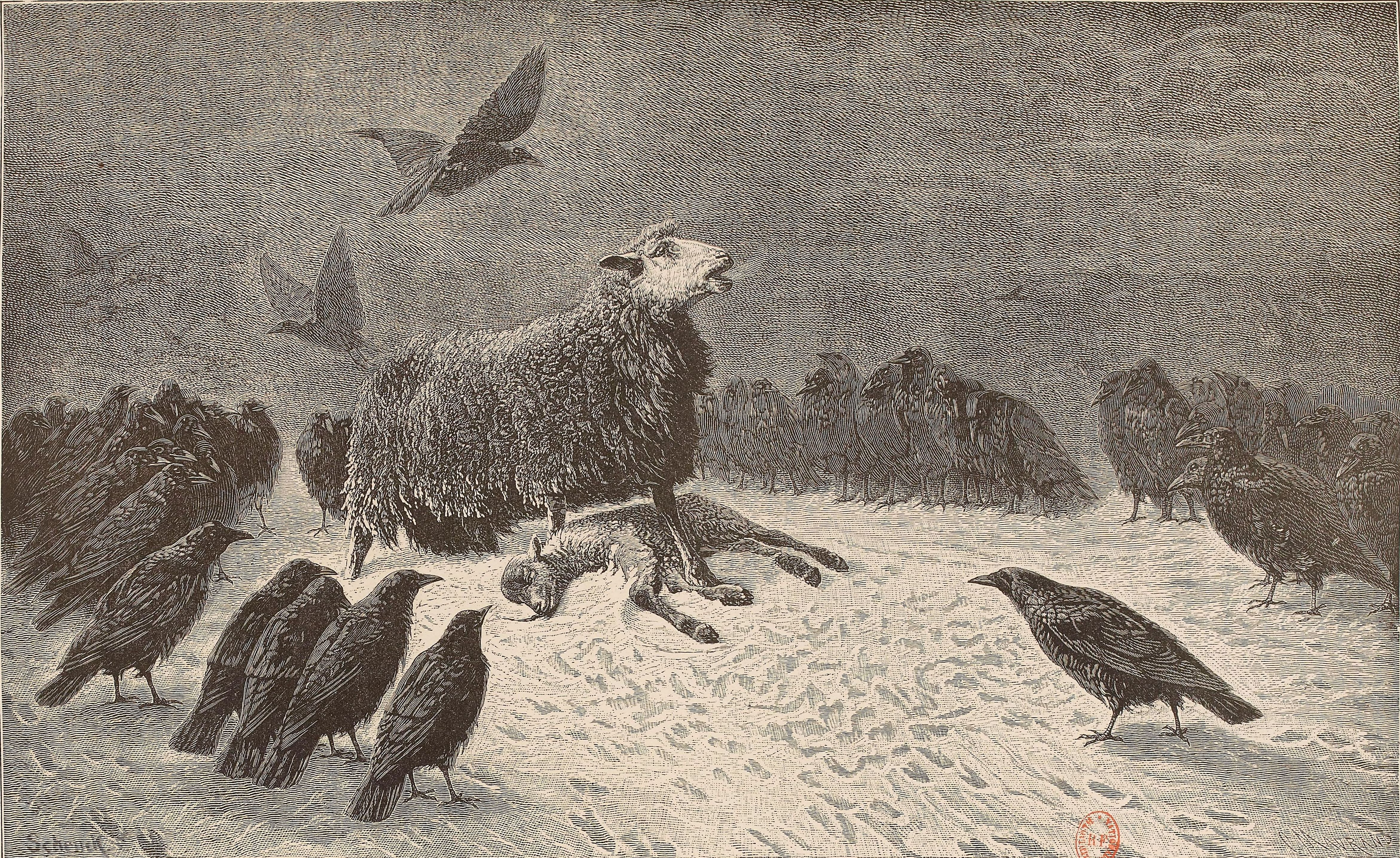
Charles Maurand's 1878 wood-engraving

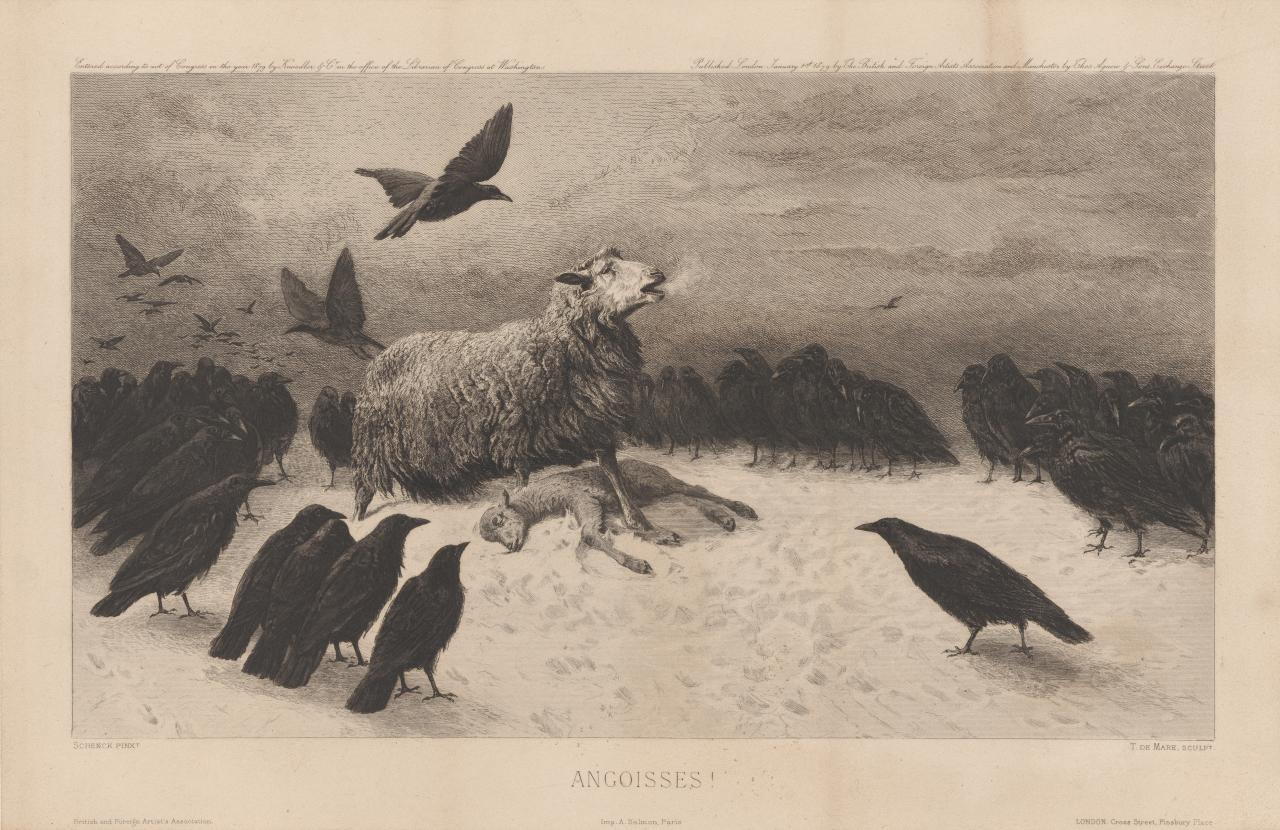
Tiburce de Mare's 1879 engraving

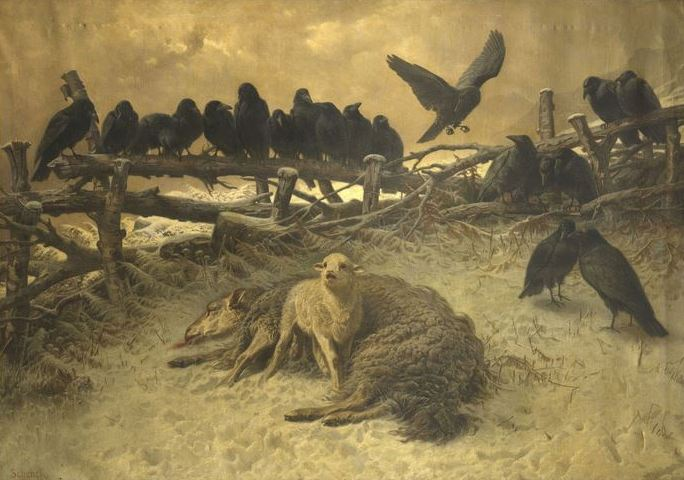
Schenck's c.1885 painting L'Orphelin, Musée d'Orsay
