= 1194 (disambiguation) =

1194 is a year.

1194 may also refer to:

- 1194 Aletta, an asteroid
- YBP 1194, a star
- NGC 1194, a lenticular galaxy
- PGC 1194, a spiral galaxy
- German submarine U-1194, a German submarine from World War II
- USS La Moure County (LST-1194), a Newport-class tank landing ship
- Woob 1194, a 1994 album by Woob
