= Charles McCreery =

British psychologist (born 1942)

Charles Anthony Selby McCreery (born 30 June 1942) is a British psychologist, best known for his collaboration with Celia Green on work on hallucinatory states in normal people.

== Biography ==
Charles McCreery was born at Stanton St. John in Oxfordshire. He is the son of General Sir Richard McCreery and Lettice, daughter of Major Lord Percy St. Maur and granddaughter of Algernon St Maur, 14th Duke of Somerset.

During the Coronation of Queen Elizabeth II in 1953 Charles McCreery was a page to Field Marshal Viscount Alanbrooke, and took part in the ceremony in Westminster Abbey.

McCreery was educated at Eton College (1955–60) and New College, Oxford (1961–64), where he read Philosophy and Psychology.

Since 1964, he has collaborated with Celia Green on a series of studies of hallucinatory experiences in ostensibly normal people, including studies of out-of-body experiences, in which people seem to perceive their own physical body ‘from outside’. From 1987 to 2000, he also collaborated with the Oxford psychologist Gordon Claridge on work on the theoretical construct of schizotypy.

In 1993, he was awarded a doctorate by the University of Oxford for work relating out-of-body experiences to schizotypy.

From 1996 to 2000, McCreery was Lecturer in Experimental Psychology at Magdalen College, Oxford.

Since 1998, he has been a Research Director at Oxford Forum.

McCreery is also a composer, having published "Fourteen Tolkien Songs for Children's Voices". In 1996, his "Elegy for violin and piano" was shortlisted for the Match Composition Prize.

== Research ==
The three main areas of McCreery's work with Celia Green have been the types of hallucinatory experience known as lucid dreams (dreams in which the subject is aware that he or she is dreaming), out-of-body experiences, and apparitional experiences.

McCreery was the co-author with Celia Green of a book entitled Apparitions (1975). According to a survey they conducted most apparitions appear visually within three metres of the person, and the experience is usually short, lasting less than a minute in many cases. They put forward the hypothesis that not only was the figure of the apparition hallucinatory, but the rest of the field of perception at the time as well.

Green and McCreery proposed the term metachoric experience to denote experiences of this kind, in which the subject's entire field of perception is replaced with a hallucinatory one. This enabled them to relate apparitional experiences to lucid dreams and out-of-body experiences, which they argued also meet this definition.

McCreery later collaborated with Green on a book on lucid dreaming, which discussed further the concept of metachoric experience, and added false awakenings to the category.

In addition to books co-authored with Green, McCreery has published two accounts of a proposed theory of psychosis, linking the phenomena of psychosis, such as hallucinations and delusions, to arousability, Stage 1 sleep and dreams. The first of these accounts appeared in a collection of papers edited by Gordon Claridge. A fuller account appeared subsequently as a standalone paper: ‘’Dreams and Psychosis, A New Look at an Old Hypothesis.’’

In 2006 McCreery published a paper on the implications of hallucinatory experiences of the sane for the philosophy of perception. This argues that the phenomena provide empirical support for the theory of representationalism as against that of direct realism.

McCreery has also published a series of online tutorials on statistics for first-year psychology students.

McCreery's most recent book is a study of the psychology of genius, with particular reference to the economic conditions which have favoured the development of genius in the historical past, notably the role of private patronage.

== Books ==
- Science, Philosophy and ESP. Foreword by Professor H.H. Price. London: Faber and Faber, 1967.
- Psychical Phenomena and the Physical World. Foreword by Sir George Joy. London: Hamish Hamilton, 1973.
- Apparitions (with Celia Green). London: Hamish Hamilton, 1975.
- Lucid Dreaming: the Paradox of Consciousness During Sleep (with Celia Green). London: Routledge, 1994.
- The Abolition of Genius. Foreword by Professor Hans Eysenck. Oxford: Oxford Forum, 2012.
- Out-of-the-Body Experiences: Implications for a Theory of Psychosis. Oxford: Oxford Forum, 2023. ISBN 1916090656

== Selected papers ==
- McCreery, C., and Claridge, G., ‘A study of hallucination in normal subjects – I. Self-report data’ (1996). Personality and Individual Differences, 21, 739–747.
- McCreery, C., and Claridge, G., ‘A study of hallucination in normal subjects – II. Electrophysiological data’ (1996). Personality and Individual Differences, 21, 749–758.
- ‘Hallucinations and arousability: pointers to a theory of psychosis’ (1997). In Claridge, G. (ed.): Schizotypy, Implications for Illness and Health. Oxford: Oxford University Press.
- McCreery, C., and Claridge, G., ‘Healthy schizotypy: the case of out-of-the-body experiences’ (2002). Personality and Individual Differences, 32, 141–154.
- ‘Perception and hallucination: the case for continuity’. Philosophical Paper No. 2006-1, Oxford: Oxford Forum.
- ’Dreams and psychosis: a new look at an old hypothesis’. Philosophical Paper No. 2008-1, Oxford: Oxford Forum.

== Online statistics tutorials ==
- 'Probability and Bayes' Theorem'
- 'Mean, median, mode and skewness'
- 'The Chi-square test'
- 'The t-test and the Mann-Whitney U test'
- ‘The Matched Pairs t-Test and the Wilcoxon Signed-Ranks Test’
- 'Analysis of Variance'

== See also ==
- Hallucinations in the sane
