= Anhedonia =

Inability to feel pleasure

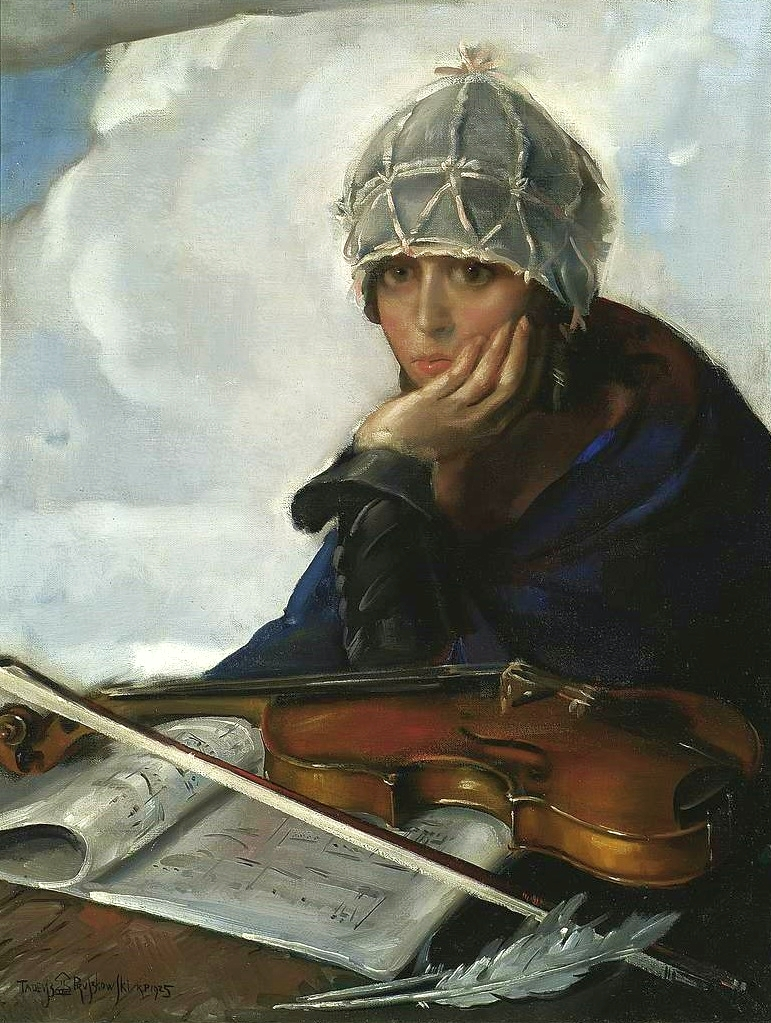
- Melancholia, by Tadeusz Pruszkowski
- Pronunciation: /ˌænhiˈdoʊniə/ AN-hee-DOH-nee-ə
- Specialty: Psychiatry
- Symptoms: Reduced motivation and ability to experience pleasure, particularly from previously enjoyable activities

Anhedonia is a diverse array of deficits in hedonic function, including reduced motivation or ability to experience pleasure. While earlier definitions emphasized the inability to experience pleasure, anhedonia is currently used by researchers to refer to reduced motivation, reduced anticipatory pleasure (wanting), reduced consummatory pleasure (liking), and deficits in reinforcement learning. In the Diagnostic and Statistical Manual of Mental Disorders, Fifth Edition (DSM-5), anhedonia is a component of depressive disorders, substance-related disorders, psychotic disorders, and personality disorders, where it is defined by either a reduced ability to experience pleasure, or a diminished interest in engaging in previously pleasurable activities. While the ICD-10 does not explicitly mention anhedonia, the depressive symptom analogous to anhedonia as described in the DSM-5 is a loss of interest or pleasure.

== Definition ==
While anhedonia was originally defined in 1896 by Théodule-Armand Ribot as the reduced ability to experience pleasure, it has been used to refer to deficits in multiple facets of reward. Reconceptualizations of anhedonia highlight the independence of "wanting" and "liking". "Wanting" is a component of anticipatory positive affect, mediating both the motivation (i.e. incentive salience) to engage with reward, as well as the positive emotions associated with anticipating a reward. "Liking", though, is associated with the pleasure derived from consuming a reward. The consciousness of reward-related processes has also been used to categorize reward in the context of anhedonia, as studies comparing implicit behavior versus explicit self-reports demonstrate a dissociation of the two. Learning has also been proposed as an independent facet of reward that may be impaired in conditions associated with anhedonia, but empirical evidence dissociating learning from either "liking" or "wanting" is lacking.

Anhedonia has also been used to refer to "affective blunting", "restricted range of affect", "emotional numbing", and "flat affect", particularly in the context of post-traumatic stress disorder (PTSD). In PTSD patients, scales measuring these symptoms correlate strongly with scales that measure more traditional aspects of anhedonia, supporting this association.

== Causes ==
Studies in clinical populations, healthy populations, and animal models have implicated a number of neurobiological substrates in anhedonia. Regions implicated in anhedonia include the prefrontal cortex as a whole, particularly the orbitofrontal cortex (OFC), the striatum, amygdala, anterior cingulate cortex (ACC), hypothalamus, and ventral tegmental area (VTA). Neuroimaging studies in humans have reported that deficits in consummatory aspects of reward are associated with abnormalities in the ventral striatum and medial prefrontal cortex, while deficits in anticipatory aspects of reward are related to abnormalities in hippocampal, dorsal ACC and prefrontal regions. These abnormalities are generally consistent with animal models, except for inconsistent findings with regard to the OFC. This inconsistency may be related to the difficulty in imaging the OFC due to its anatomical location, or the small number of studies performed on anhedonia; a number of studies have reported reduced activity in the OFC in schizophrenia and major depression, as well as a direct relationship between reduced activity and anhedonia. Researchers theorize that anhedonia may result from the breakdown in the brain's reward system, involving the neurotransmitter dopamine. Anhedonia can be characterised as "impaired ability to pursue, experience or learn about pleasure, which is often, but not always accessible to conscious awareness".

The conditions of akinetic mutism and negative symptoms are closely related. In akinetic mutism, a stroke or other lesion to the anterior cingulate cortex causes reduction in movement (akinetic) and speech (mutism).

== Occurrence ==
=== Major depressive disorder ===
Anhedonia occurs in roughly 70% of people with a major depressive disorder. It is a core symptom of major depressive disorder, so individuals experiencing this symptom can be diagnosed with depression, even in the absence of low/depressed mood. The Diagnostic and Statistical Manual of Mental Disorders (DSM) describes a "lack of interest or pleasure", but these can be difficult to discern given that people tend to become less interested in things that do not give them pleasure. The DSM criterion of weight loss is probably related, and many individuals with this symptom describe a lack of enjoyment of food. They can portray any of the non-psychotic symptoms and signs of depression.

=== Schizophrenia ===
Anhedonia is one of the negative symptoms of schizophrenia. Although five domains are usually used to classify negative symptoms, factor analysis of questionnaires yield two factors, with one including deficits in pleasure and motivation. People with schizophrenia retrospectively report experiencing fewer positive emotions than healthy individuals, but "liking" or consummatory pleasure is intact in people with schizophrenia, as they report experiencing the same degree of positive affect when presented with rewarding stimuli. Neuroimaging studies support this behavioral observation, as most studies report intact responses in the reward system (i.e. ventral striatum, VTA) to simple rewards. However, studies on monetary rewards sometimes report reduced responsiveness. More consistent reductions are observed with regard to emotional response during reward anticipation, which is reflected in a reduced responsiveness of both cortical and subcortical components of the reward system. Schizophrenia is associated with reduced positive prediction errors (a normal pattern of response to an unexpected reward), which a few studies have demonstrated to be correlated with negative symptoms. People with schizophrenia demonstrate impairment in reinforcement learning tasks only when the task requires explicit learning, or is sufficiently complex. Implicit reinforcement learning, on the other hand, is relatively intact. These deficits may be related to dysfunction in the ACC, OFC and dlPFC leading to abnormal representation of reward and goals.

=== Substance-related disorders ===
Anhedonia is common in people who are dependent upon any one or more of a wide variety of drugs, including alcohol, opioids, cannabinoids, and nicotine. Although anhedonia becomes less severe over time, it is a significant predictor of relapse.

=== Post-traumatic stress disorder ===
While post-traumatic stress disorder (PTSD) is associated with reduced motivation, part of the anticipatory "wanting", it is also associated with elevated sensation seeking, and no deficits in physiological arousal, or self-reported pleasure to positive stimuli. PTSD is also associated with blunted affect, which may be due to the high comorbidity with depression.

=== Parkinson's disease ===
Anhedonia occurs frequently in Parkinson's disease, with rates between 7 and 45% being reported. Whether or not anhedonia is related to the high rates of depression in Parkinson's disease is unknown.

=== Bipolar depression ===
Anhedonia is also reported to appear in people with bipolar depression.

=== Attention deficit hyperactivity disorder ===
Anhedonia may be associated with attention deficit hyperactivity disorder (ADHD). Impairments of dopaminergic and serotonergic function in the brain of those with ADHD result in dysregulation of reward processing, which can lead to anhedonia.

=== Neuroleptics ===
Neuroleptics have often been reported to induce a characteristic state of lethargy, cognitive slowing, emotional blunting, and reduced motivation. While these effects could impair day-to-day functioning, they were also associated with improvements in psychotic symptoms and related issues such as insomnia. For some individuals, symptom relief contributed to a renewed sense of normality and autonomy; however, others described a diminished sense of self or personality. Across studies, many long-term users reported adopting a passive attitude toward medication, characterized by feelings of resignation, endurance, or reduced autonomy.

=== Eating disorders ===
In a meta-analysis and systematic review conducted in 2021, anhedonia was found to be significantly higher in people with eating disorders compared to healthy controls.

== Risks ==
In a meta-analysis conducted in 2023, anhedonia was found to be a risk factor for suicidal behaviors. In another research article, a robust association was found between anhedonia and suicidal ideation, independently of depression.

== Treatment ==
=== Treatment resistance and dopaminergic interventions ===
The anhedonia experienced by individuals with major depressive disorder (MDD) has been difficult to treat using traditional pharmacotherapies, including dopaminergic therapies. A network meta-analysis published in 2024 revealed that pro-dopaminergic strategies, including bupropion, resulted in small improvements in anhedonia symptoms, with confidence intervals suggesting the possibility of non-response. Non-dopaminergic antidepressants showed comparatively larger effects, suggesting that anhedonia may not respond robustly to dopamine-targeted therapies alone.

=== Ketamine ===
A 2024 meta-analysis suggested that ketamine may exert anti-anhedonic effects in patients experiencing depressive episodes amid unipolar or bipolar affective disorders. Supporting neuroimaging evidence highlights ketamine's influence on neuroplasticity, evidenced by changes in functional connectivity that align with improvements in anhedonia symptoms. A systematic review conducted in 2021 suggested improvement in suicidal ideation and anhedonia after ketamine infusion for bipolar depression.

=== Minocycline ===
In a meta-analysis conducted in 2019, minocycline reduced both immobility and anhedonia-related outcomes, indicating its potential as an effective treatment for core depressive symptoms.

=== Amantadine ===
Amantadine has shown potential to reduce anhedonia through preclinical studies demonstrating its antidepressant-like effects. In animal models like chronic unpredictable mild stress (CUMS), amantadine reversed reductions in sucrose preference (an indicator of anhedonia) by modulating glutamatergic systems via NMDA receptor antagonism and enhancing synaptic plasticity through increased BDNF expression. Additionally, in traumatic brain injury models inducing depressive behaviors, it preserved dopamine levels and boosted sucrose intake, suggesting dopaminergic mechanisms contribute to alleviating anhedonia. While clinical trials support amantadine's role in improving overall depressive symptoms, often as an adjunct to antidepressants.

=== Sirukumab ===
Sirukumab, a monoclonal antibody targeting interleukin-6 (IL-6), may reduce anhedonia in major depressive disorder (MDD) by modulating inflammatory pathways linked to reward and hedonic processes. Elevated IL-6 levels in MDD are associated with impaired positive valence systems, including anhedonia, and preclinical studies in mice demonstrate that IL-6 inhibition enhances hedonic behavior, such as increased sucrose preference and resilience to stress-induced despair. In models of sustained central IL-6 elevation, anti-IL-6 antibodies like sirukumab alleviate depression-like symptoms that encompass anhedonic traits, which conventional antidepressants fail to address. Clinical evidence from inflammatory disorders shows sirukumab improves patient-reported outcomes related to mental well-being and vitality, supporting its potential to mitigate anhedonia as part of broader neuropsychiatric benefits.

=== GLP-1 receptor agonists (GLP-1RAs) ===
Glucagon-like peptide 1 receptor agonists (GLP-1RAs) have shown promise in treating anhedonia by modulating dopaminergic signaling within the brain's reward system, which is often disrupted in conditions like obesity and type 2 diabetes. These agents help normalize insulin resistance and reduce cravings, potentially alleviating the diminished pleasure response characteristic of anhedonia through their influence on reward-related behaviors. By decreasing neurocortical activation in response to high-calorie food cues and higher rewards, GLP-1RAs offer a novel therapeutic approach for motivation and reward-processing disorders, extending their use beyond metabolic regulation to address anhedonic symptoms.

=== Noninvasive brain stimulation ===
Noninvasive brain stimulation (NIBS) techniques, including repetitive transcranial magnetic stimulation (rTMS) and transcranial direct current stimulation (tDCS), show promise as treatments for anhedonia by targeting disrupted reward circuits in the brain, particularly in patients with schizophrenia and major depressive disorder. According to a systematic review and meta-analysis, NIBS interventions led to significant improvements in anhedonia symptoms, with a medium-to-large effect size of Hedges' g = 0.665 in schizophrenia studies and g = 0.443 in sham-controlled depression trials. These findings link NIBS to enhanced neural plasticity in prefrontal areas like the dorsolateral prefrontal cortex, offering a non-pharmacological adjunct for cases where traditional antidepressants or antipsychotics fall short.

== Sexual anhedonia ==
Sexual anhedonia in males is also known as "ejaculatory anhedonia". This condition means that a male will ejaculate with little to no accompanying sense of pleasure. The condition is most frequently found in males, but females can experience lack of pleasure when the body goes through the orgasm process, as well.

Sexual anhedonia may be caused by:

- Hyperprolactinaemia
- Hypoactive sexual desire disorder (HSDD), also called inhibited sexual desire
- Low levels of the hormone testosterone
- Spinal cord injury
- Multiple sclerosis
- Use of SSRI/SNRI antidepressants or having used SSRI/SNRI antidepressants in the past
- Use (or previous use) of antidopaminergic neuroleptics (anti-psychotics)
- Fatigue
- Physical illness

A neurological examination and blood tests are very unlikely to determine the cause of a specific case of sexual anhedonia.

Patients may be prescribed sustained-release bupropion to aid in treatment, which has been shown to relieve sexual dysfunction even in patients without depression.

== Social anhedonia ==
=== Definition ===
Social anhedonia is defined as a disinterest in social contact and a lack of pleasure in social situations, and is characterized by social withdrawal. This characteristic typically manifests as an indifference to other people. In contrast to introversion, a nonpathological dimension of human personality, social anhedonia represents a deficit in the ability to experience pleasure. Additionally, social anhedonia differs from social anxiety in that social anhedonia is predominantly typified by diminished positive affect, while social anxiety is distinguished by both decreased positive affect and exaggerated negative affect.

This trait is currently seen as a central characteristic, as well as a predictor, of schizophrenia spectrum disorders. It is also widely linked to autism spectrum disorder.

=== Signs and symptoms ===
- Decreased ability to experience interpersonal pleasure
- Social withdrawal/isolation
- Decreased capacity for social contact and interaction
- Lack of close friends and intimate relationships, and decreased quality of those relationships
- Poor social adjustment
- Decreased positive affect
- Flat affect
- Depressed mood
- State-related anxiety

=== Background and early clinical observation ===
The term anhedonia is derived from the Greek an-, "without" and hēdonē, "pleasure". Interest in the nature of pleasure and its absence dates back to ancient Greek philosophers such as Epicurus. The symptoms of anhedonia were introduced to the realm of psychopathology in 1809 by John Haslam, who characterized a patient with schizophrenia as indifferent to "those objects and pursuits which formerly proved sources of delight and instruction". The concept was formally coined by Théodule-Armand Ribot and later used by psychiatrists Paul Eugen Bleuler and Emil Kraepelin to describe a core symptom of schizophrenia. In particular, Sandor Rado postulated that schizotypes, or individuals with the schizophrenic phenotype, have two key genetic deficits, one related to the ability to feel pleasure (anhedonia) and one related to proprioception. In 1962, Meehl furthered Rado's theory through the introduction of the concept of schizotaxia, a genetically driven neural integrative defect thought to give rise to the personality type of schizotypy. Loren and Jean Chapman further distinguished between two types of anhedonia: Physical anhedonia, or a deficit in the ability to experience physical pleasure, and social, or a deficit in the ability to experience interpersonal pleasure.

Recent research suggests that social anhedonia may represent a prodrome of psychotic disorders. First-degree relatives of individuals with schizophrenia show elevated levels of social anhedonia; higher baseline scores of social anhedonia are associated with later development of schizophrenia. These findings provide support for the conjecture that it represents a genetic risk marker for schizophrenia-spectrum disorders.

Additionally, elevated levels of social anhedonia in patients with schizophrenia have been linked to poorer social functioning. Socially anhedonic individuals perform worse on a number of neuropsychological tests than non-anhedonic participants, and show similar physiological abnormalities seen in patients with schizophrenia.

=== Comorbidity ===
Anhedonia is present in several forms of psychopathology and autism spectrum disorder.

==== Depression ====
Social anhedonia is observed in both depression and schizophrenia, but social anhedonia is a state related to the depressive episode and the other is a trait related to the personality construct associated with schizophrenia. These individuals both tend to score highly on self-report measures of social anhedonia. Blanchard, Horan, and Brown demonstrated that, although both the depression and the schizophrenia patient groups can look very similar in terms of social anhedonia cross-sectionally, over time as individuals with depression experience symptom remission, they show fewer signs of social anhedonia, while individuals with schizophrenia do not. Blanchard and colleagues (2011) found individuals with social anhedonia also had elevated rates of lifetime mood disorders including depression and dysthymia compared to controls.

==== Social anxiety ====
As mentioned above, social anxiety and social anhedonia differ in important ways. Social anhedonia and social anxiety, though, are also often comorbid. People with social anhedonia may display increased social anxiety and be at increased risk for social phobias and generalized anxiety disorder. The exact relationship between social anhedonia and social anxiety, and whether one potentiates the other, has yet to be determined. Individuals with social anhedonia may display increased stress reactivity, meaning that they feel more overwhelmed or helpless in response to a stressful event compared to control subjects who experience the same type of stressor. This dysfunctional stress reactivity may correlate with hedonic capacity, providing a potential explanation for the increased anxiety symptoms experienced in people with social anhedonia. In an attempt to separate out social anhedonia from social anxiety, the Revised Social Anhedonia Scale didn't include items that potentially targeted social anxiety. However, more research must be conducted on the underlying mechanisms through which social anhedonia overlaps and interacts with social anxiety. The efforts of the "social processes" RDoC initiative will be crucial in differentiating between these components of social behavior that may underlie mental illnesses such as schizophrenia.

=== Primary relevance in schizophrenia and its spectrum disorders ===
Social anhedonia is a core characteristic of schizotypy, which is defined as a continuum of personality traits that can range from normal to disordered and contributes to risk for psychosis and schizophrenia. Social anhedonia is a dimension of both negative and positive schizotypy. Research has revealed that anhedonia reflects the diminished experience of pleasure, so individuals with schizophrenia reported that doing activities they previously found enjoyable is no longer enjoyable for them. It involves social and interpersonal deficits, but is also associated with cognitive slippage and disorganized speech, both of which fall into the category of positive schizotypy. Not all people with schizophrenia display social anhedonia and likewise, people who have social anhedonia may never be diagnosed with a schizophrenia-spectrum disorder if they do not have the positive and cognitive symptoms that are most frequently associated with most schizophrenia-spectrum disorders.

Social anhedonia may be a valid predictor of future schizophrenia-spectrum disorders; young adults with social anhedonia perform in a similar direction to schizophrenia patients in tests of cognition and social behavior, showing potential predictive validity. Social anhedonia usually manifests in adolescence, possibly because of a combination of the occurrence of critical neuronal development and synaptic pruning of brain regions important for social behavior and environmental changes, when adolescents are in the process of becoming individuals and gaining more independence.

=== Treatment ===
No validated treatment for social anhedonia has been identified. Future research should focus on genetic and environmental risk factors to hone in on specific brain regions and neurotransmitters that may be implicated in social anhedonia's cause, and could be targeted with medication or behavioral treatments. Social support may also play a valuable role in the treatment of social anhedonia. Blanchard et al. found that a greater number of social supports, as well as a greater perceived social support network, were related to fewer schizophrenia-spectrum symptoms and to better general functioning within the social anhedonia group. So far, no medicine has been developed to specifically target anhedonia.

=== Sex differences ===
In the general population, males score higher than females on measures of social anhedonia. This sex difference is stable throughout time (from adolescence into adulthood) and is also seen in people with schizophrenia-spectrum disorders. These results may reflect a more broad pattern of interpersonal and social deficits seen in schizophrenia-spectrum disorders. On average, males with schizophrenia are diagnosed at a younger age, have more severe symptoms, worse treatment prognosis, and a decrease in overall quality of life compared to females with the disorder. These results, coupled with the sex difference seen in social anhedonia, outline the necessity for research on genetic and hormonal characteristics that differ between males and females, and that may increase risk or resilience for mental illnesses such as schizophrenia.

=== Assessing social anhedonia ===
There are several self-report psychometric measures of schizotypy which each contain subscales related to social anhedonia:

- Revised Social Anhedonia Scale – Chapman Psychosis Proneness Scales
- No Close Friends Subscale – Schizotypal Personality Questionnaire
- Introverted Anhedonia Subscale – Oxford–Liverpool Inventory of Feelings and Experiences

=== Genetic components ===
L. J. and J. P. Chapman were the first to discuss the possibility that social anhedonia may stem from a genetic vulnerability. The disrupted in schizophrenia 1 (DISC1) gene has been consistently associated with risk for, and cause of, schizophrenia-spectrum disorders and other mental illnesses. More recently, DISC1 has been associated with social anhedonia within the general population. Tomppo identified two specific alleles of DISC1, one of them linked to increased characteristics of social anhedonia, and the other to decreased in characteristics; the latter was found to be preferentially expressed in women. More research needs to be conducted, but social anhedonia may be an important intermediate phenotype (endophenotype) between genes associated with risk for schizophrenia and phenotype of the disorder.

=== Neurobiological correlates ===
Researchers studying the neurobiology of social anhedonia posit that this trait may be linked to dysfunction of reward-related systems in the brain. This circuitry is critical for the sensation of pleasure, the computation of reward benefits and costs, determination of the effort required to obtain a pleasant stimulus, deciding to obtain that stimulus, and increasing motivation to obtain the stimulus. In particular, the ventral striatum and areas of the prefrontal cortex (PFC), including the orbitofrontal cortex (OFC) and dorsolateral PFC, are critically involved in the experience of pleasure and the hedonic perception of rewards. With regards to neurotransmitter systems, opioid, gamma-aminobutyric acid, and endocannabinoid systems in the nucleus accumbens, ventral pallidum, and OFC mediate the hedonic perception of rewards. Activity in the PFC and ventral striatum have been found to be decreased in anhedonic individuals with major depressive disorder and schizophrenia. However, schizophrenia may be less associated with decreased hedonic capacity and more with deficient reward appraisal.

== Musical anhedonia ==
Recent studies have found people who do not have any issue processing musical tones or beat, yet receive no pleasure from listening to music.

== See also ==
- Avolition
- Disorders of diminished motivation
- Dopamine fasting
- Apathy
