= Apparitional experience =

Anomalous experience in parapsychology

In parapsychology, an apparitional experience is an anomalous experience characterized by the apparent perception of either a living being or an inanimate object without there being any material stimulus for such a perception.

In academic discussion, the term apparitional experience is preferred to the term ghost because:

1. The term ghost implies that some element of the human survives death and, at least under certain circumstances, can make itself perceptible to living humans. There are other competing explanations of apparitional experiences.
2. First-hand accounts of apparitional experiences differ in many respects from their fictional counterparts in literary or traditional ghost stories and films.
3. The content of apparitional experiences includes living beings, both human and nonhuman, and even inanimate objects.

== History ==
Attempts to apply modern scientific or investigative standards to the study of apparitional experiences began with the work of Edmund Gurney, Frederic W. H. Myers and Frank Podmore, who were leading figures in the early years of the Society for Psychical Research (founded in 1882). Their motive, as with most of the early work of the Society, was to provide evidence for human survival after death. For this reason they had a particular interest in what are known as "crisis cases". These are cases in which a person reports having a hallucinatory experience, visual or otherwise, which apparently represents someone at a distance; this experience subsequently being considered to have coincided with that person's death, or a significant life event of some kind. If the temporal coincidence of the crisis and the distant apparitional experience cannot be explained by any conventional means, then in parapsychology the presumption is made that some as yet unknown form of communication, such as telepathy (a term coined by Myers) has taken place.

While it may be said that the work of Gurney and his colleagues failed to provide convincing evidence for either telepathy or survival of death, the large collection of first-hand written accounts which resulted from their methods may nevertheless be regarded as providing a valuable body of data concerning the phenomenology of hallucinations in the sane.

A later discussion of apparitional experiences was that of G. N. M. Tyrrell, also a leading member of the Society for Psychical Research of his day. He accepted the hallucinatory character of the experience, pointing out that it is virtually unknown for first-hand accounts to claim that apparitional figures leave any of the normal physical effects, such as footprints in snow, that one would expect of a real person. He develops the idea that the apparition may be a way for the unconscious part of the mind to bring to consciousness information that has been paranormally acquired – in crisis cases, for example. He introduces an evocative metaphor of a mental "stage-carpenter", behind the scenes in the unconscious part of the mind, and constructing the quasi-perceptual experience that eventually appears on the stage of consciousness, so that it embodies paranormal information in a symbolic way, a person drowning at a distance appearing soaked in water, for example.

The study and discussion of apparitions developed in a different direction in the 1970s, with the work of Celia Green and Charles McCreery. They were not primarily interested in the question of whether apparitions could shed any light on the existence or otherwise of telepathy, or in the survival question; instead they were concerned with analyzing a large number of cases with a view to providing a taxonomy of the different types of experience, viewed simply as a type of anomalous perceptual experience or hallucination.

One of the points highlighted by their work was that "real-life" accounts of apparitional experiences differ markedly from the traditional or literary ghost story. These are some of the more notable differences, at least as indicated by their own collection of 1800 first-hand accounts:

- Subjects of apparitional experiences are by no means always frightened by the experience; indeed they may find them soothing or reassuring at times of crisis or ongoing stress in their lives.
- Spontaneous apparitional experiences tend to happen in humdrum or every-day surroundings, and under conditions of low central nervous system arousal, most often in the subject's own home – while doing housework, for example. By contrast, subjects who visit reputedly haunted locations in hopes of "seeing a ghost" are more often than not disappointed.
- Apparitions tend to be reported as appearing solid and not transparent; indeed they may be so realistic in a variety of ways as to deceive the percipient as to their hallucinatory nature; in some cases the subject only achieves insight after the experience has ended.
- It is unusual for an apparitional figure to engage in any verbal interaction with the percipient; this is consistent with the finding that the majority of such experiences only involve one sense (most commonly the visual).

== Psychological implications ==
=== Psychological theories of perception ===
Apparitional experiences have relevance to psychological theories of perception, and in particular to the distinction between top-down and bottom-up approaches (cf. article on Top-down and bottom-up design). Top-down theories, such as that of Richard Langton Gregory, who conceives of perception as a process whereby the brain makes a series of hypotheses about the external world, stress the importance of central factors such as memory and expectation in determining the phenomenological content of perception; while the bottom-up approach, exemplified by the work of James J. Gibson, emphasises the role of the external sensory stimulus.

Apparitional experiences would seem to lend support to the importance of central factors, since they represent a form of quasi-perceptual experience in which the role of external stimuli is minimal or possibly non-existent, while the experience nevertheless continues to be phenomenologically indistinguishable from normal perception, at least in some cases.

=== Schizotypy ===
The interest of apparitional experiences to psychology has acquired an added dimension in recent years with the development of the concept of schizotypy or psychosis-proneness. This is conceived of as a dimension of personality, continuously distributed throughout the normal population, and analogous to the dimensions of extraversion or neuroticism. As long as mental illness is regarded under the disease model, according to which a person either does or does not 'have' schizophrenia or manic depression, just as a person either does or does not have syphilis or tuberculosis, then to talk of the occurrence of an apparitional or hallucinatory experience in a normal person is either an oxymoron, or to be taken as an indication of latent or incipient psychosis. If, on the contrary, a dimensional view of the matter is taken, it becomes easier to conceive of how normal people, more or less high on the putative schizotypy dimension, might be more or less prone to anomalous perceptual experiences, without their ever tipping over into psychosis.

Green and McCreery's identification of a class of what they called 'reassuring apparitions' is of particular interest in this regard, as it suggests that the experiencing of hallucinations may even have an adaptive effect in certain subjects, making them better able to cope with adverse life events. This would fit with the model of schizotypy as essentially a normal dimension of personality, and might help to explain why the proneness to anomalous perceptual experiences has apparently not been 'weeded out' by the process of natural selection.

== Philosophical implications ==
=== Direct realism ===
Apparitional experiences also have implications for the philosophy of perception. The occurrence of hallucinations, that is, perceptual experiences 'having the character of sense perception, but without relevant or adequate sensory stimulation [...]', have long been one of the standard objections to the philosophical theory of direct realism. According to this theory we are in some sense in direct contact with the external world when we seem to be perceiving it, and not merely in direct contact with some mediating representation in our mind, such as a sense-datum or an image, which may or may not correspond to external reality. The psychologist J.J. Gibson, referred to above, became an advocate of the philosophical theory of direct realism.

Hallucinatory experiences reported by sane people do not pose any new problem in principle for the theory of direct realism, other than that posed already by the more widely discussed hallucinations reported by people in a state of psychosis or under other abnormal conditions such as sensory deprivation. They pose the problem in a particularly stark way, for the following reasons:

==== Scepticism about the status of verbal reports ====
In the case of hallucinations reported to have occurred in pathological or abnormal states there is some scope for uncertainty about the accuracy, or even the meaning, of the percipient's verbal report. Horowitz, for example, summarising his experience of questioning patients with chronic schizophrenia about their visual experiences during painting sessions, wrote:

'It was necessary to persist beyond initial verbal descriptions of their hallucinations, and insist that the patient describe and draw what he had seen. Initial descriptions of "vicious snakes" might then be drawn and redescribed as wavy lines. "Two armies struggling over my soul" arose from the subjective experience of seeing moving sets of dots. "Spiders" might be reduced, when the patient stated and drew what he actually saw, to a few radiating lines. In drawings of their hallucinations patients could often distinguish between those forms which duplicated what they saw with their eyes from those forms which were what they "made out of it".'

Such difficulties of interpretation are much less obvious in the case of written reports by ostensibly normal subjects, in good health and not medicated at the time of the experience.

==== Extreme realism of the experience ====
At least some of the apparitional experiences reported by normal subjects appear to mimic normal perception to such a degree that the subject is deceived into thinking that what he or she is experiencing actually is normal perception. Similar close mimicking of normal perception is reported by some of the subjects of a lucid dream and out-of-body experiences, which therefore pose similar problems for the theory of direct realism.

=== Representationalism ===
Apparitional experiences appear prima facie more compatible with the philosophical theory of representationalism. According to this theory, the immediate objects of experience when we are perceiving the world normally are representations of the world, rather than the world itself. These representations have been variously called sense-data or images. In the case of an apparitional experience one might say that the subject is aware of sense-data or images which happen not to correspond to, or represent, the external world in the normal way.

The philosophical implications of hallucinatory experiences in the sane are discussed by McCreery. He argues that they provide empirical support for the theory of representationalism rather than direct realism.

== See also ==
- Philosophy of perception
- Bilocation
- Doppelgänger
- Etiäinen
- Hamr (folklore)
- Marian apparition
- Private revelation
- Sleep paralysis
- Shadow person
- Vardøger
- List of parapsychology topics

== Sources ==
- Ferriar, John (1813), An essay towards a theory of apparitions, London: Cadell and Davies
- Bennett, Sir Ernest (1939). Apparitions and Haunted Houses: A Survey of Evidence. London: Faber and Faber.
- Tyrell, G. N. M.; Price, H. H. (1943). Apparitions. London: Gerald Duckworth. ISBN 978-1169829879.
- Horowitz, M. J. (1964). "The imagery of visual hallucinations". Journal of Nervous and Mental Disease. 138 (6): 513–523. doi:10.1097/00005053-196406000-00002. PMID 14165140.
- Green, Celia Elizabeth; McCreery, Charles (1975). Apparitions. London: Hamish Hamilton. ISBN 9780241891827.
