= Lucid Dream (disambiguation) =

A lucid dream is a dream during which the dreamer is aware that they are dreaming.

Lucid Dream may also refer to:

== Film and TV ==
- Lucid Dream (film), a 2017 South Korean film

== Music ==
- "Lucid Dreams" (Franz Ferdinand song), 2008
- "Lucid Dreams" (Juice Wrld song), 2018
- "Lucid Dream" (Owl City song), 2018
- "Lucid Dream", a 2021 song by Aespa from Savage
- Lucid Dreams 0096, a 1996 album credited to 0096
- Lucid Dreams, a 2023 album by BoyWithUke
- "Lucid Dreaming", a 2016 song by Tinashe from Nightride

== See also ==
- Lucid Air Dream Edition, an electric car
