= Continuing bonds =

Bereavement theory

Continuing bonds is a bereavement theory that suggests that maintaining a lasting connection with a deceased loved one is a common part of grieving, rather than a hindrance to "moving on". In the recent times, both psychological literature and popular culture view ongoing bonds with the deceased as pathological in grief. According to the dominant model, the purpose of grief is to let go and move on. Toward the end of the 20th century, Dennis Klass, Phyllis Silverman, and Steven Nickman developed a prototype of grief that includes continuing interactions with the dead, while remaining "open to both the positive and negative consequences of this activity".

Among the various instances of continuing bonds include sensing the presence of the dead, maintaining connections through physical objects, having a belief that the deceased influences thoughts or events, and consciously integrating the deceased's characteristics into personal or group identity. While the intensity of these bonds may subside, they often persist in some form throughout a survivor's life. Attempting to completely leave the deceased behind would itself constitute a denial of reality, as relationships naturally persist and shape ongoing experiences and identities.

Meanwhile, maintaining bonds generally does not imply a failure to accept the permanence of the loss or the physical separation. Continuing bonds have been observed across diverse cultures and historical periods, reflecting the significant cognitive and emotional investment humans consistently place in their relationships with their departed loved ones.

Aside from this age-long cultural recognition, 20th-century psychological theories significantly diverged from these traditional views, claiming instead that severing ties with the deceased was very vital. The emergence of continuing bonds theory marked a major challenge to these prevailing ideas, prompting a reevaluation of what constitutes normative grieving. </include>

== Historical context and development ==
Historically, many cultures have maintained relationships with deceased loved ones through ritual and tradition. Ancient Roman parentalia festivals and Egyptian ancestor cults involved regular offerings to sustain the presence of the deceased. Medieval Christianity came up with rituals such as masses for the dead and observances like All Souls' Day, framing the living as spiritual caretakers of souls believed to reside in purgatory. Victorian culture codified elaborate mourning rituals, including photographs of the deceased, hair jewelry, and extended periods of mourning dress.

Meanwhile, 20th-century Western psychological models of bereavement, heavily influenced by Sigmund Freud's "grief work" hypothesis and later by John Bowlby's attachment theories, emphasized "letting go" of the deceased as essential to healthy grieving. These models regarded continued attachment as problematic or pathological.

In the late 20th century, empirical research began to document instances in which mourners maintained ongoing relationships with the deceased as a typical rather than exceptional response to loss. In his ethnographic study of a self-help group of parents whose children had died, Dennis Klass observed that these parents continued to include their deceased children in their lives and family narratives. Klass recalled thinking that either all the parents in the self-help group were suffering from pathological grief, or the definition of pathology was wrong. The parents showcased mentally healthy to him. Therefore, the prevailing definition of healthy grief as one requiring the severing of all bonds was simply uncalled for.

Phyllis Silverman found that bereaved children often maintained internal relationships with their departed parents. Steven Nickman identified continued connections in his studies of adoptees and their birth families. These converging findings highlighted the commonplace nature of continuing bonds, prompting a re-examination of dominant grief paradigms.

In the early 1990s, Klass, Silverman, and Nickman joined forces to gather evidence for this emerging perspective. Silverman proposed creating a book to showcase the new understanding they and others were developing. They invited researchers who had reported similar phenomena in diverse populations, from widows to bereaved children. The resulting volume, Continuing Bonds: New Understandings of Grief (1996), was compiled as an anthology of studies and clinical observations challenging the "detachment" model of grief. Contributors documented how bereaved individuals do not sever their ties to the dead the way the dominant bereavement theory said they should. Researchers presented evidence that maintaining bonds with the deceased is not pathological; indeed, such bonds could play positive roles in survivors' ongoing lives.

The anthology's message resonated broadly and continuing bonds became widely accepted as a normal method of grief. The concept was soon incorporated into counseling practices and popular understandings of mourning, marking a significant shift in the bereavement paradigm.

== Origin of the term "Continuing Bonds" ==
While preparing their anthology Continuing Bonds: New Understandings of Grief, editors Dennis Klass, Phyllis Silverman, and Steven Nickman initially struggled to find a concise and suitable name for the phenomenon they observed. At first, they used the working title "Detachment Revisited," emphasizing their critique of the existing paradigm, which advocated emotional detachment from the deceased. However, this provisional title did not clearly convey the concept they wished to highlight, that is, the natural maintenance of connections with the deceased.

Dennis Klass sought assistance from his wife, Carol S. Klass, a child development specialist. The concept of bonding was central to her graduate studies and her professional work with parents and children. Klass himself served as the professional advisor to the St. Louis Chapter of The Compassionate Friends, a leading bereavement support organization, and was honored with their Appreciation Award by the National Board in 1992. The couple had frequently discussed the parallels between parent–child bonds and the enduring connections that bereaved individuals and families maintained with deceased loved ones. After considering various possibilities for a week, she spontaneously said "continuing bonds" one morning. They immediately recognized the phrase as the right one. The co-editors swiftly embraced it.

Notably, the phrase "continuing bonds" entered bereavement literature from the field of child development rather than from psychiatry or traditional grief psychology. This reflected an important conceptual shift: Maintaining emotional connections after death had already been recognized within child development studies but had largely been overlooked in mainstream adult bereavement models at the time.

== Core concepts ==
Continuing bonds theory posits that relationships with deceased individuals continue beyond death, becoming integrated into the ongoing lives and identities of the bereaved. Rather than framing these bonds as attachments that must eventually be relinquished, the theory recognizes them as evolving extensions of pre-existing relationships which are maintained through various practices, rituals, and internal dialogues that shape both personal and collective identities.

Central to continuing bonds is the recognition that grief unfolds within relational and social contexts. The bereaved often experience the deceased's presence in their internal world through memories, imagined dialogues, dreams, or sensory experiences. These internal connections are not pathological or illusory; rather, they reflect a realistic continuation of the relationship, acknowledging the deceased's lasting influence on the bereaved person's identity, decisions, and values.

The presence of the deceased is also sustained externally through symbolic objects, shared rituals, and communal practices. Personal items that belonged to the deceased or physical locations associated with their memory serve as tangible anchors for the relationship. Cultural and religious rituals from individual acts such as visiting graves, lighting candles, or writing letters, to collective ceremonies often provide structured ways of maintaining and reaffirming these bonds.

An essential contribution of continuing bonds theory is its emphasis on intersubjectivity and collective meaning-making. Grief is inherently social; it involves shared narratives, communal rituals, and collective representations that embed the deceased within broader cultural and societal frameworks. Funeral practices and eulogies, for example, serve as spaces where individual grief intersects with collective memory, reinforcing bonds with the deceased through shared stories and public acknowledgment.

Continuing bonds also function as collective representations within wider social and political contexts. Societies often embed relationships with their deceased within their cultural narratives and identities. Cemeteries, memorial sites, and public commemorations of significant figures or community members illustrate how continuing bonds sustain social cohesion, reinforce group identity, and mediate collective memory. For instance, national cemeteries or shrines dedicated to fallen soldiers symbolize powerful societal ties, reinforcing national identity and social solidarity.

Furthermore, these bonds often reflect a sense of reciprocity between the living and the dead. Ritual practices in various cultures such as ancestor veneration or charitable acts performed in the memory of the deceased, express mutual relationships. The living engage in acts believed to assist the deceased spiritually, while the deceased are seen as offering moral guidance, solace, and inspiration to the living.

== Criticism ==
=== Methodological debates ===
A central debate concerning the continuing bonds model involves its empirical measurement. Critics such as Stroebe et al. (2012) have noted that Klass, Silverman, and Nickman relied primarily on qualitative methods, theoretical propositions, and case-study illustrations, without clear quantitative evidence linking continuing bonds to positive grief adjustment. Klass and Silverman (1996), however, anticipated this critique. They explicitly defended their choice of qualitative approaches, arguing that quantitative methods grounded in positivist assumptions of detached objectivity, could not adequately capture the subjective, relational dimensions of grief, especially those involving ongoing interactions with the deceased. Their methodological choice thus deliberately prioritized subjective meaning-making processes and relationships over discrete, measurable behaviors or outcomes.

Beyond methodological concerns, continuing bonds theory has faced broader scholarly critiques regarding its conceptual clarity, the distinction between adaptive and maladaptive manifestations, the internal versus external expression of bonds, cross-cultural applicability, and its tensions with traditional psychological grief models such as attachment theory.

=== Conceptual clarity and measurement ===
Some critics argue that the term "continuing bonds" is defined too broadly, encompassing experiences ranging from fond memories and internalized role models to quasi-sensory perceptions or hallucinations of the deceased. This breadth raises concerns about theoretical precision. Some researchers have suggested that continuing bonds may represent one aspect of the normal grieving process rather than a distinct adaptive mechanism. Scholars have also struggled to consistently work with the concept. Early studies often measured grief outcomes using only depressive symptoms, which risked neglecting bereavement-specific responses such as intense yearning for the deceased. An analysis published in OMEGA argued that standard bereavement measures focused too narrowly on depression, failing to account for yearning is a core grief reaction closely associated with ongoing bonds. These measurement challenges have complicated efforts to empirically determine the impact of continuing bonds on post-loss adjustment.

=== Adaptive versus maladaptive expressions ===
Another debate centers on whether maintaining bonds with the deceased is generally beneficial or potentially harmful. Early proponents emphasized the adaptive comfort these bonds can provide, but later reviews concluded that "neither is it possible to conclude that continuing nor that relinquishing bonds is generally helpful." Instead, outcomes appear dependent on how, when, and for whom such bonds are expressed. Attachment theorists, particularly Shaver and Tancredy (2001), criticized continuing bonds theorists for presuming that such bonds are beneficial. They argued that this assumption causes them to overlook signs of pathology, such as unresolved grief or attachment anxiety evident in their research data. From the attachment theory perspective, certain types of continuing bonds may be maladaptive, especially when characterized by persistent disbelief or refusal to accept the death. For example, externalized manifestations, such as frequent hallucinations or persistent sensations of the deceased's physical presence, might reflect a failure to integrate the loss. In contrast, internalized bonds, such as finding comfort in memories or using the deceased's memory as a secure emotional base, are often viewed as adaptive.

=== Cross-cultural applicability ===
Criticism also arises regarding distinctions between internally held (psychological) and externally expressed (behavioral or ritualistic) bonds. Klass (2013) noted that shortly after the continuing bonds theory was introduced, scholars began questioning whether maintaining bonds actually facilitates healthier grief outcomes. Answering this question has proven difficult. As a result, researchers began examining whether psychological outcomes differed significantly depending on whether bonds were sustained internally especially through memories and imagined interactions or externally, through rituals and behaviors. This line of inquiry highlights the complexity inherent in implementing continuing bonds and underscores ongoing debates about the nuanced impacts of different modes of maintaining connections with the deceased.

The cross-cultural applicability of continuing bonds theory has also faced scrutiny. Critics argue that the concept originated within Western grief paradigms and may reflect implicit cultural biases. Comparative studies have shown significant cultural variation in outcomes associated with continuing bonds. For instance, Lalande and Bonanno (2006) found that maintaining continuing bonds was associated with poorer adjustment among American participants but better adjustment among Chinese participants, suggesting that Western assumptions regarding healthy grief may not be universally applicable. Accordingly, researchers caution against generalizing Western-based models of mourning to culturally diverse populations.

Finally, continuing bonds theory has been criticized for its unresolved tensions with traditional psychological models especially attachment theory, which historically viewed prolonged attachments as signs of unresolved grief. Critics call for clearer theoretical integration and a greater acknowledgment of diverse grieving processes, arguing that continuing bonds theory must explicitly address and reconcile these conceptual divergences.

== See also ==
- Anomalous experiences
- Grief

== Selected bibliography ==
- Goss, R., & Klass, D. (2005). Dead but not lost: Grief narratives in religious traditions. AltaMira.
- Klass, D. (1988). Parental grief: Solace and resolution. Springer Publishing Company.
- Klass, D. (1993). The inner representation of the dead child and the worldviews of bereaved parents. OMEGA - Journal of Death and Dying, 26(4), 255–272. https://doi.org/10.2190/GEYM-BQWN-9N98-23Y5
- Klass, D. (1996a). Ancestor worship in Japan: Dependence and the resolution of grief. OMEGA - Journal of Death and Dying, 33(4), 279–302. https://doi.org/10.2190/F19D-TAXL-M8DY-KPBQ
- Klass, D. (1997). The deceased child in the psychic and social worlds of bereaved parents during the resolution of grief. Death Studies, 21(2), 147–176. https://doi.org/10.1080/074811897202056
- Klass, D. (1999). Spiritual lives of bereaved parents. Brunner/Mazel.
- Klass, D. (2013). Sorrow and solace: Neglected areas in bereavement research. Death Studies, 37(7), 597–616. https://doi.org/10.1080/07481187.2012.673535
- Klass, D. (2014). Grief, consolation, and religions: A conceptual framework. OMEGA - Journal of Death and Dying, 69(1), 1–18. https://doi.org/10.2190/OM.69.1.a
- Klass, D. (2022). Culture, consolation, and continuing bonds in bereavement: The selected works of Dennis Klass. Routledge.
- Klass, D., Shinners, B. (1983). Professional roles in self-help groups for the bereaved. OMEGA - Journal of Death and Dying, 13(4), 361–375. https://doi.org/10.2190/VE7L-7ULX-CR86-50U2
- Klass, D., & Steffen, E. M. (Eds.). (2018). Continuing bonds in bereavement: New directions for research and practice. Routledge.
- Klass, D., Silverman, P. R., & Nickman, S. (Eds.). (1996b). Continuing bonds: New understandings of grief. Taylor & Francis.
- Klass, D., Silverman, P. R., & Nickman, S. (Eds.). (2014). Continuing bonds: New understandings of grief. Taylor & Francis.
- Klass, D., & Walter, T. (2001). Processes of grieving: How bonds are continued. In M. S. Stroebe, R. O. Hansson, W. Stroebe, & H. Schut (Eds.), Handbook of bereavement research: Consequences, coping, and care (pp. 431–448). American Psychological Association. https://doi.org/10.1037/10436-018
- Silverman, P. R. (1999). Never too young to know: Death in children's lives. Oxford University Press. https://doi.org/10.1093/oso/9780195109559.001.0001
- Silverman, P. R., & Worden, J. W. (1992). Children's reactions in the early months after the death of a parent. American Journal of Orthopsychiatry, 62(1), 93–104. https://doi.org/10.1037/h0079304
- Worden, J. W., & Silverman, P. R. (1996). Parental death and the adjustment of school-age children. OMEGA - Journal of Death and Dying, 33(2), 91–102. https://doi.org/10.2190/P77L-F6F6-5W06-NHBX

== Popular media and mass coverage ==
- Bernhard, M. (2021). What if There's No Such Thing as Closure?. The New York Times Magazine. Explores the concept of closure and emphasizes the importance of continuing bonds as an alternative understanding of grief.
- Dewan, S. K. (2001). Closure? A Buzzword Becomes a Quest. The New York Times. Analyzes society's pursuit of closure following loss and tragedy, implicitly highlighting continuing bonds as a contrasting model.

== Grief counseling and practitioner resources ==
- Good Grief. 5 Tips for Continuing Bonds with People We've Lost. Good-Grief.org. Practical suggestions from grief counselors on maintaining meaningful connections after loss.
- Doka, K. J. (2020). Continuing Bonds, Not Chains of Pain. Psychology Today. Argues that continuing bonds provide healthy emotional support rather than prolonging grief.
- Haley, E., & Williams, L. A Grief Concept You Should Care About: Continuing Bonds. What's Your Grief. Accessible introduction to continuing bonds, emphasizing its significance in grief support.
- Sudden Unexplained Death in Childhood Foundation. Navigating Grief Through Continuing Bonds. SUDC Foundation.Supportive guidance for families experiencing sudden loss, utilizing continuing bonds as a framework.
- Silverman, P. R. (2010). Thinking About Continuing Bonds. Psychology Today. Explores how continuing bonds help children navigate and process grief.
- Peterson, D. (2012). Death Does Not End a Relationship. Psychology Today. Discusses how maintaining relationships with the deceased can positively impact the grieving process.

== Films ==
- Kirtadze, N. (Director). (2003). Dites à mes amis que je suis mort (Tell My Friends That I'm Dead). [Film]. Documentary exploring traditional Georgian mourning rituals and cultural practices that explicitly encourage ongoing communication and bonds between the living and the dead.
- Stone, A. (Director). (2023). Atmospheric Marginalia. [Film]. Visual exploration of grief, memory, and ongoing relationships with the deceased.
- Edmonds, J., & Harris, J. (Directors). (2017). A Love That Never Dies. [Film]. The Good Grief Project. Documentary following filmmakers Jimmy Edmonds and Jane Harris on their personal journey after losing their son, exploring how bereaved parents maintain continuing bonds with their deceased children through rituals, storytelling, and shared experiences of grief. Available for home viewing on Amazon and Vimeo.
