= Woob2 4495 =

Woob^{2} 4495

Studio album by Woob
- Released: 21 September 1995
- Recorded: Square Centre Studios
- Genre: Electronic, ambient
- Label: Em:t Records
- Producer: Paul Frankland

Woob^{2} 4495 is the second full-length album from Woob, the stage name of ambient musician Paul Frankland. It was released in the UK on em:t records on 21 September 1995.

Professional ratings
Review scores
Source	Rating
Muzik	0.5/5 stars

== Overview ==
While not as well achieved as the predecessor, Woob 1194, Woob^{2} 4495 still contains critically acclaimed content, such as the 25-minute-long "Depart", and the album's closer, "Later". It also contains the shortest Woob track to date, the 33-second long "Cupboard", which is made up of elements of "Depart". The album also makes less use of vocal samples than 1194, instead using organic sounds such as hand-claps and heartbeats.

Frankland himself was dissatisfied with the album; in a 1998 interview, he said: "Woob² did not quite live up to my expectations. On a compilation I had a track where the band really played together with guitar, drums and bass. I wanted the second Woob album to really sound "live", but that was not possible". More recently, in 2009, he stated "the second was a lot more structured, with mostly predefined arrangements", lacking the spontanteity and serendipity that defined the first album.

The album's cover (like all em:t releases of the 1990s, a digipak) shows a keel-billed toucan. Unusually for an em:t release, however, the sleeve folded out to reveal two cartoon-like illustrations.

Two tracks recorded during the 4495 sessions ended up on em:t compilation CDs – one that emerged before the album itself was released, and one after. These are "Fourteen Thirty Three" featured on Em:t 2295, and "Mould", (which makes use of samples taken from the film Sex, Lies, and Videotape), which featured on Em:t 5595. Elements of "Mould" would be re-used on the track "Stranger Air", on the Repurpose album.

Both the tracks "Cupboard" and "Depart" contain samples from the 1986 animated film Street of Crocodiles directed by the Brothers Quay.

== Repurpose ==
On 1 May 2010, it was announced via Paul Frankland's blog that a new Woob album, Repurpose, would be released. It finally emerged on 27 May. Repurpose contains two tracks that are reworked versions of tracks from 4495 – "Nylon", a new remix of "Later", and "Departure", a remixed and shortened version of "Depart". It also contains samples of other Woob tracks from various em:t releases and compilation albums.

Repurpose was released in three forms: 25 numbered first edition CDs, 150 second edition CDs, and as a download on SoundCloud; and eventually on the iTunes music store.

== Legacy ==
Though not as lauded as the first Woob album, the reputation of 4495 remains high. The Ambient Music Guide website describes the album as a "surreal journey, this time though some deep, dark tropical jungle teeming with life, an aural travelogue filled simultaneously with visions of beauty and lurking, unseen menace", adding that the mix of electronics and live instrumentation is "quietly dazzling".

In common with many other em:t releases, 4495 is highly sought after by ambient music fans, and copies can fetch over £50 on eBay (with pristine, shrink-wrapped copies fetching as high as £125). So far, 4495 has not been re-released, though some of the tracks are now available as name-your-price downloads from the official Woob website (with one track, "Tillstand", being a remix of "Gate"; another track, "Pondlife," was also made available).

More recently, in June 2020, the 2nd track of Woob2 4495, Pondlife, was used in the analog horror web series Gemini Home Entertainment, specifically in the eighth episode Sleep Image Visualizer.

== Track list ==
1. "Gate" (4:26)
2. "Pondlife" (4:53)
3. "Woobed" (12:21)
4. "Creek" (8:35)
5. "Cupboard" (0:33)
6. "Depart" (24:57)
7. "Later" (6:18)

== Woob^{3} ==
Shortly after he completed work on his second Journeyman album, Frankland planned a third Woob album as a follow-up to 4495, to be released on em:t. However, financial problems at em:t prevented this, and work on the album was never begun. 4495 proved to be Frankland's last full-length Woob album for em:t records, although subsequent Woob material would be released on various compilations until the collapse of the em:t label in 1998. More than a decade would elapse before any new Woob material would emerge, with the release of the download-only track "Unknown Quantity" in January 2010.

In September 2010, Frankland stated on his blog that a Woob soundtrack album, entitled Paradigm Flux, was to be released, following a collaboration with the artist and film-maker Samuel Cockedey. Confusingly, this followed an announcement that the forthcoming album from Frankland's Max and Harvey project would be known as Woob^{3}.

In November 2011, Frankland issued Return to the City, a soundtrack album for the film of the same name. Whilst not formally constituting the third Woob album, the album is the first album of all-new Woob material since 4495. It was released as a limited edition keycard with extra tracks via Frankland's website, then subsequently on iTunes.

On 21 November 2012, Frankland finally released the album Have Landed (also known as Woob^{3}) via his Season 9 website, in a variety of formats. The album combines material from both Frankland's Max and Harvey project, as well as new Woob material. The album is branded with a new Woob logo. The album also features production by Tom Smyth, who was involved in many of the original em:t releases, and contributions from Riad Abji, who provided much of the live instrumentation on 4495.

On 13 September 2013 the official third Woob album, titled Ultrascope or Woob 1113, was released, almost 18 years after 4495.
