= Em:t Records =

British ambient record label

- Industry: Music
- Genre: Ambient, electronic music
- Founded: 1994
- Headquarters: Nottingham, England
- Owner: t:me Recordings
- Parent: t:me Recordings
- Website: Official homepage

Em:t Records (pronounced as "Emit Records") was a British record label, based in Nottingham, which specialized in ambient music. They were active from 1994 to 1998, and after a period of bankruptcy, re-established themselves in 2003 under new ownership and management. In the year 2006, the label officially went defunct.

== History ==
em:t was born as a division of the t:me Recordings label in 1994. t:me released mostly vinyl records falling under the broad category of house music, and sought to create a new sublabel for more forward-thinking ambient material. Over the next four years, they released a series of eighteen albums and compilations, packaged as a collector's series. Though em:t never enjoyed widespread commercial success, their releases were highly regarded and influential in ambient circles, and the label attracted a cult following – encouraged, no doubt, by the collectible nature of the releases.

em:t releases had strict rules governing their design aesthetic. Individual album titles were always the sequential four-digit catalogue number of the disc; the album's cover was always a full-colour picture of a wild animal; all albums were released on CD only; all CDs were packaged in digipacks; all CDs themselves bore the same Chinese character in black on the non-playing face of the disc.

The label garnered praise from music journalists at the time. Coda magazine wrote that "The Em:t series will surely go down in history for being as important in the 90s as the albums of Brian Eno were in the 70s", and specialist music magazine The Wire noted that the em:t catalogue represented "The vanguard of post-dance technological music". Em:t produced promo postcards for the label on which these quotes, and others, were duly displayed. A Q&A in DJ Magazine in 1995 also stated the label's unofficial credo: "Never presume your audience is any less clever than you are".

The most highly praised albums of the series came from British composers Paul Frankland recording as Woob, and Mat Jarvis recording as Gas.

In addition to the original run of CDs in the UK, some of em:t's music was licensed to Instinct Records in the US, a label that had a contemporaneous interest in modern ambient music. em:t 0094 and Woob's 1194 were released individually. The compilations em:t 2295 and em:t 3394 were packaged together as a double-disc set called em:t 2000. In addition, various other tracks were compiled onto the anthologies em:t beat exploration and em:t explorer.

In mid-1998, em:t went out of business due to the bankruptcy of t:me, with two whole albums worth of music still unreleased – a new compilation album, and a second Gas album. Their discography became highly prized among collectors, and this remains the case today; individual CDs commonly fetch a high price on eBay.

In 2003, a separate company, headed by the conceptual designer John Lancaster & entrepreneur Matthew Hall, brought the em:t name off the shelf and the label was relaunched. Although none of the people running the label had any connection with the previous em:t, they did release material from several of the original artists. The relaunch created another surge in public interest for the original series of albums. After six new full-length albums, the label considered em:t was taken as far as they could take it and the label came to an end. The website shut down in July 2013.

== The em:t "sound" ==
All of the albums on the original run of em:t releases fit into the general category of Ambient music, or downtempo. Within this category there were many variations – Woob's releases were often ambient dub, Gas' music was ambient techno, Carl Stone's album was almost classical and the album by International People's Gang was almost pop. However, across all the releases there were certain recurring elements that identified the album as an em:t release. Most prominent were samples of animal noises recorded in the wild – heard on releases by Woob, Qubism, Beatsystem, Miasma, and others (this approach was taken to the extreme on the track "Waterpump" by Dallas Simpson, on the 1197 compilation, which is a 12-minute music-free recording of a self actuated water pressure pump in a Derbyshire countryside filled with birdsong and, as with both of Simpson's tracks featured in the series, "abha" 2296, "waterpump" 1197, were recorded in full binaural stereo for full periphonic headphone surround sound listening). Other tracks processed field recordings and used them as percussion, such as "Pool" by International People's Gang, which uses the clacking of pool balls as instrumentation, and "00" by Richie Warburton, which uses the back-and-forth of a tennis match for the same purpose. Samples of television series such as Quantum Leap, Steptoe and Son and Star Trek were also used, as well as samples from films, such as Sex, Lies, and Videotape and 2001: A Space Odyssey, and film soundtracks.

All of the initial run of em:t releases were processed using the Roland Sound Space RSS 3D sound imaging system, giving the music an extra "spacious" quality.

== Legacy ==
The em:t series of albums are still prized among electronic music fans, and the reputation of the label and the music endures to this day. However, due to rights issues, only two of the original em:t series are available on iTunes; the rest continue to fetch exaggerated prices on auction sites such as eBay. In 2017, Bandcamp has made all Em:t releases available for both purchase and streaming except for Woob 1194 and Woob^{2} 4495. However Woob 1194 can be found on Paul Frankland's Bandcamp account, but Woob^{2} is not seen anywhere (Most likely due to his dissatisfaction for the album). In 2018, however, the Bandcamp page disappeared.

== Artwork ==
em:t releases are noted for their striking graphic design, used consistently and thematically across the entire discography. Each CD is packaged in a cardboard Digipak case. The front features high-resolution nature photography, depicting exotic animals in their natural habitats. The back is plain white, with the track listing in plain black text. Animals used on classic Em:t covers include Ceratophrys ornata, Plecotus auritus, Ctenophore and Ramphastos sulfuratus. Images of frogs were used exclusively for compilation releases, whereas individual artists were given freedom to pick an image from the Oxford Scientific catalogue.

The "new" em:t releases did not have animal-themed covers, but sported the same overall design aesthetic, and used the same numbering system.

The animal-themed designs were created for em:t by British design firm The Designer's Republic, also well known for working with Warp Records for many years. Post-2003 em:t releases were designed by Cambridge-based design firm db|design.

== Discography ==
All em:t releases are catalogued with a four-digit number. The third and fourth digits represent the year of release, and the first two digits denote the order of release within a year, beginning with '00' and continuing on to '11', '22', etc.

=== Classic em:t (1994–1998) ===
- Various Artists – em:t 0094
- Woob – 1194 (re-released in 2009)
- Qubism – 2294
- Various Artists – em:t 3394
- Gas 0095 (re-released in 2006)
- Miasma – 1195
- Various Artists – em:t 2295
- International Peoples Gang – International Peoples Gang – 3395
- Woob – 4495
- Various Artists – em:t 5595
- Lucid Dreams 0096 (featuring Celia Green) – 0096
- Carl Stone – 1196
- Various Artists – em:t 2296
- Undark – 3396
- Slim – 0097
- Various Artists – em:t 1197
- Beatsystem – 2297
- Natural Language – 0098
- Various Artists – em:t 1198 (unreleased)
- Gas – 2298 (unreleased)
- Various Artists – em:t 2000

=== New Em:t (2003–2006) ===
- Various Artists – em:t 0003
- Various Artists – em:t 0004
- Gaudi Testa 1105 – CONTINUUM
- Gel-Sol – 1104
- 302 Acid – 0005
- 302 Acid Live at The Big Chill (limited CD-R)
- International Peoples Gang – International Peoples Gang – 0006

== See also ==
- Woob
- Mat Jarvis
- Carl Stone
- The Designers Republic
- List of electronic music record labels
