= 302 Acid =

302 Acid is a music group from Washington, D.C., United States, formed by Doug Kallmeyer and Justin Mader in 2002. It currently includes Doug Kallmeyer (strings, samples, projections), Justin Mader (samples, projections).

Video projections are a component of their live performances, and their music has improvisatory elements. Notable in the sound is Kallmeyer's use of an electric double bass.

The group released an EP entitled Ailanthus Altissima on the Hackshop Records label in 2004, and subsequently a full-length album 302 acid0005 on the Nottingham-based Em:t Records label in 2005. The title of the latter release is in accord with em:t's naming conventions, but the work contained in the release is actually titled Even Calls. A limited CD-R of their performance at the Big Chill music festival was also released by Em:t. The group is currently working on a new album. The group has toured in the U.S., Canada, and the U.K., and has performed several live radio broadcasts.

The group took their name from an NFPA 704 hazard placard for hydrochloric acid that can be frequently seen when traveling the Washington Metro system.
