= Gas 0095 =

Studio album by Gas
- Released: January 1995
- Recorded: Gas studio, Nottingham
- Genre: Ambient techno
- Length: 72:56
- Label: Em:t Records emit0095
- Producer: Mat Jarvis

Gas 0095 was the debut album of electronic musician Mat Jarvis (High Skies) released under his Gas moniker. It was written, performed and recorded in his Nottingham studio during 1994 and released on Em:t Records (Emit Records) in January 1995.

The album was never advertised, yet quickly began selling by word of mouth. Before its 2008 re-release and remaster it was known to regularly sell for $400+ on auction sites, like eBay, to collectors. The album was encoded in 3D by the large and hugely expensive Roland Sound Space RSS 3D sound imaging system.

In 2008, Gas 0095 was remastered at 32bit/96 kHz from the original studio tapes, and re-released on CD and digital download by Jarvis on the Microscopics label as Micro-000001.

== Track listing, 1995 version ==
(Names listed as styled on back cover. Note that many of the track lengths given are not correct, actual lengths are listed in parentheses)

1. "generator 0000"- 0:33 (0:35)
2. "experiments on live electricity"- 16:36 (16:35)
3. "microscopic"- 9:50 (9:53)
4. "miniscule" - 0:00, "pixels"- 1:27 (Named separately but grouped together as track 4)(1:30)
5. "vapourware"- 2:00 (1:30)
6. "SeOCl_{2}"- 0:33 (0:35)
7. "earthshake"- 8:15 (8:56)
8. "mathematics and electronics"- 12:30 (12:50)
9. "timestretch"- 0:01, "earthloop"- 3:40 (Named separately but grouped together as track 9)(3:46)
10. "f"- 0:20 (0:50)
11. "H_{2}TeO_{3}"- 0:20
12. "discovery"- 10:30
13. "generator 0072"- 5:08
- The song "generator 0072" ends at 1:23. After 25 seconds of silence (1:23 - 1:48), begins the hidden track "Pink" (1:48 - 3:53). After "Pink", there are 25 seconds of silence (3:53 - 4:18) and the hidden track "Doom" (4:18 - 5:08).

== Track listing, 2008 version ==
(Names listed as styled on back cover)

1. "generator"- 0:35
2. "experiments on live electricity"- 16:40 (16:40)
3. "microscopic"- 9:55 (9:54)
4. "miniscule" - 0:00 (0:04)
5. "pixels"- 1:30 (1:27)
6. "vapourware"- 1:30 (1:28)
7. "selenium"- 0:40 (0:38)
8. "earthshake"- 9:00 (8:57)
9. "mathematics and electronics"- 12:50 (12:49)
10. "timestretch"- 0:02 (0:04)
11. "earthloop"- 3:45
12. "f"- 0:15 (0:14)
13. "tellurium"- 0:35 (0:32)
14. "discovery"- 11:00
15. "generator 74"- 1:15 (Time does not include "pink" or "doom")

== Oddities ==
- The track "Timestretch" is a full four-minute track, shrunk down into one second of audio. Much speculation has been made over whether this track can be stretched back again to recover the full version.
- The track "Miniscule" is a four and a half minute track time-stretched down to twelve milliseconds and is intended as a "comma" between tracks.
- There are two extra unlisted tracks, "Pink" and "Doom", which appear at the end of the album. "Pink" is a short instrumental, while "Doom" is composed of sound effects from the last level of the classic 1990s computer game, DOOM.

== Artwork ==
Em:t releases are noted for their striking graphic design, and the 0095 cover is no different. It features a iridescent Ctenophore zooming off like an alien spaceship. The high resolution nature photography is believed to have been chosen by an artist with layout by British design firm The Designers Republic.
