= Mat Jarvis =

British electronic musician

Mat P. Jarvis is a British electronic musician, who released one full-length CD and several other tracks on the Em:t Records label under the name Gas. Jarvis later released material under the name "Jarman".

Jarvis' work as Gas is often mistakenly credited to an alias used by unrelated German electronic musician Wolfgang Voigt.

His album Gas 0095, which includes "Microscopic", "Experiments on Live Electricity" and "Discovery", is noted for the inclusion of the track "Timestretch", which is rumoured to be a complete four-minute track shrunk down to one second.

Em:t Records went out of business before the follow-up album Gas 2298 could be released.

== Discography ==
=== Albums ===
- Gas 0095 (Em:t Records, 1995)
- Gas 0095 - remastered (Microscopics, 2007)
- Gas 2298 - unreleased

=== Singles and EPs ===
- "Particles" (Time Records, 1992)
- "Know Your World" (Time Records, 1992)
- "Sumatra" EP (as High Skies) (Miso Records, 2003)
- "Sounds of Earth" EP (as High Skies) (Microscopics, 2010)
- "The World Forgotten" (as High Skies) (Microscopics, 2012)

=== Compilation appearances ===
- Em:t 0094 (tracks "Pixels", "Earthloop") (Em:t Records, 1994)
- Em:t 3394 (track "Microscopic") (Em:t Records, 1994)
- Highway & Landscape (track "Earthshake") (Distance Records, 1995)
- Em:t 2295 (track "Shockwaves") (Em:t Records, 1995)
- Emit 2000 (tracks "Microscopic", "Shockwaves") (Instinct, 1995)
- Emit Explorer (tracks "Experiments On Live Electricity", "Discovery") (Instinct, 1995)
- Em:t 2296 (track "Vapournaut") (Em:t Records, 1996)
- Em:t 1197 (track "Oxygen") (Em:t Records, 1997)
- Em:t Beat Exploration (track "Oxygen") (Instinct, 1997)
- 360° (track "Staars", as High Skies) (The Foundry, 2001)
- Ambient02 (track "Microscopic"), as 'Gas (Mat Jarvis)' (Ambient02, 2002)
- Em:t 0003 (track "Red Green Blue", as High Skies) (Em:t Records, 2003)
- Em:t 0004 (track "Burning Buildings", as High Skies) (Em:t Records, 2004)
- Fluidities (track "The Shipping Forecast", as High Skies) (The Foundry, 2004)

=== Remixes ===
- Charles Webster - Remixed On The 24th July (track "Gift Of Freedom - High Skies remix") (Peacefrog Records)

== Video game soundtrack use ==
The tracks "Discovery" and "The Shape of Things to Come" were used in the 2009 video game Osmos.
