= Beatsystem =

- Born: Derek Pierce
- Origin: United Kingdom
- Genres: Electronic, ambient
- Occupation(s): Electronic musician, record producer
- Years active: 1990–present
- Labels: 4th & Broadway; FFRR; Em:t

Beatsystem (also written as Beat System) is the name of British electronic musician Derek Pierce. Two of his singles charted on the UK Singles Chart in the early 1990s; a cover of Lou Reed's "Walk on the Wild Side" which peaked at No. 63 in March 1990 and "To a Brighter Day (O' Happy Day)" at No. 70 in September 1993.

In the mid-1990s, his work shifted from electronic dance/house to experimental ambient music, releasing his debut album 2297 on the Nottingham-based ambient label Em:t Records.

== Discography ==
=== Albums ===
- Beatsystem 2297 (1997), Em:t
- The Sound of Two Eskimos Kissing (2011), Entropy Records

=== Singles ===
- "Don't Hold Back on Love" (1990), 4th & Broadway
- "Walk on the Wild Side" (1990), 4th & Broadway - UK #63
- "To a Brighter Day (O' Happy Day)" (1993), FFRR - UK #70
