= René Sudre =

French parapsychologist

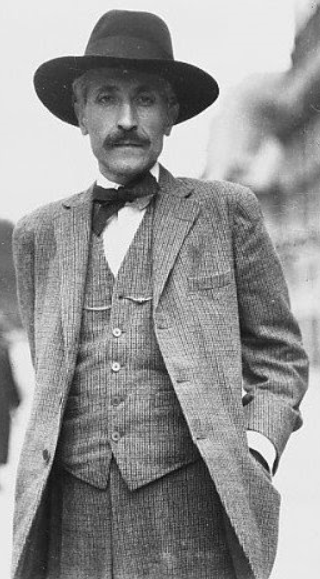
- Born: April 19, 1880; Angoulême
- Died: 1968
- Occupation(s): Journalist, parapsychologist, writer

René Sudre (April 19, 1880 – 1968) was a French journalist, parapsychologist and writer.

== Biography ==
Sudre was born in Angoulême. He studied philosophy and science at the University of Poitiers and the University of Paris-Sorbonne. He worked as a commenter for Radiodiffusion Française (1926–1940) and contributed articles to the newspaper Journal des débats (1935–1940) and Revue des Deux Mondes. He was Professor at L'Ecole des hautes Etudes Sociales (1931–1940).

During 1921–1926 he worked at the Institut Métapsychique International (IMI). Sudre came into dispute with the spiritualist orientation of the IMI as his books were critical of the spiritualist hypothesis of mediumship. In 1926, he was dismissed from the IMI by director Eugéne Osty. Sudre was "strongly anti-spiritualistic". Ernesto Bozzano attempted to refute Sudre's arguments.

His book Introduction à la Métapsychique Humaine (1926) attacked the spiritualist hypothesis and defended an animist position of creative forces similar to Henri Bergson. Sudre was a loyal friend of Harry Price. Price described him as "the leading psychist in France." He was a member of the National Laboratory of Psychical Research. He was also a member of the Society for Psychical Research and contributed articles to the Journal of the American Society for Psychical Research. He wrote book reviews for the Revue Métapsychique (1921–1926). Sudre interpreted mental and physical phenomena of mediums as evidence for clairvoyance and psychic forces.

== Reception ==
Professor John Cohen in the New Scientist for a review of Treatise on Parapsychology (1960) disputed Sudre's belief that clairvoyance had been established by science but praised the book for "demolishing" the spiritualist hypothesis of mediumship. Cohen noted that the book "ranks among the very best of its kind that have appeared on either side of the Atlantic".

Criticism of Treatise on Parapsychology came from Eric Dingwall. In a review for Nature he noted that Sudre was credulous in accepting materializations and psychic photographs as genuine. Sudre failed to cite the evidence of fraud in mediumship, he was also criticized for defending phenomena at Borley Rectory as 'incontestably genuine' and ignoring evidence to the contrary.

== Publications ==
- Introduction à la Métapsychique Humaine (1926)
- Le Huitième Art: Mission de la Radio (1945)
- Personnages d’au-delà (1946)
- Les Nouvelles Énigmes de l’univers (1951)
- Traité de Parapsychologie [Translated by Celia Green as Treatise on Parapsychology] (1956, 1960)
- Parapsychology (1962)
