= Woob =

English ambient musician

Paul Frankland
- Also known as: Woob, Journeyman, Max & Harvey
- Born: England
- Genres: Ambient, downtempo, space music, synthwave, ambient dub
- Occupations: Composer, musician, filmmaker, sound designer
- Years active: 1990s–present
- Website: Official website

Paul Frankland, better known by his stage name Woob, is an English composer, musician and filmmaker who started recording in the early 1990s. Woob's albums combine elements of ambient, downtempo and space music, with samples from field recordings. Frankland has also recorded under the names of Journeyman and Max & Harvey. After a period working as a composer and sound designer predominately for Ridley Scott Associates, he started releasing new material as 'woob' in 2010. After that time, Woob's works have gradually shifted towards a more synthwave-oriented sound and adopted a cyberpunk/futuristic imagery.

== Recording career ==
=== Woob ===
Paul Frankland started writing music as a teenager, and went on to get a master’s degree in film while also working as a DJ.

He first came to attention in the early 1990s when he submitted the track ″Void″ to the Nottingham-based t:me [sic] recording company. The track was included on the first release by t:me’s new downtempo label Em:t, a compilation album titled em:t 0094, which led to Woob signing with the label.

Woob's first full-length album, Woob 1194, was released by Em:t in 1994 and was immediately regarded as a milestone in ambient music. Production involved an Atari ST work station, Akai s950 sampler and a Gem s2 synthesizer. The tracks were mixed and performed live, which contributed to the organic and evocative nature of the music.

Following the success of his first album, which was re-released in the United States by Instinct Records, Woob contributed tracks to more Em:t compilations and to trance label Flying Rhino Records. In late 1995, he released a second album on Em:t titled Woob^{2} 4495, which garnered further praise. A third Woob album was being planned in 1998 when Em:t went out of business.

There were no Woob releases between 1999 and 2009; during this time, Frankland was writing music and doing sound design for a number of major advertising agencies, including Ridley Scott Associates and A-Bomb. The return of Woob was heralded by the re-release of Woob 1194 at the end of 2009. The 10-minute single, ″Unknown Quantity″, was released on 1 January 2010, followed in May by the album Repurpose, which combined remixes of old material with new tracks.

The ″Paradigm Flux″ EP was released in September 2010. Woob initially announced that the EP was a taster for a soundtrack album of the same name, but it was followed in November 2011 by ″Return to the City″ a full-length album that Frankland said would accompany a film described as a 'Paradigm Flux Prologue'.

November 2012 saw the release of the first album in what would become the Have Landed Trilogy, an aural journey through time and space. The first album, titled Have Landed was released as both a Woob album and an album by Max and Harvey. Frankland's website gave this explanation: ″Have Landed encompasses some of the best recordings previously released under the Max & Harvey moniker along with a plethora of new material including a few surprises″. Part of the surprise was the number of limited editions, with different CD covers and associated 'artifacts' including sticker sets, USB flash drives, and a model rocket ship. This was followed in September 2013 by the album ULTRASCOPE, released in various editions including the extensively remixed ″Time Paradox″ version. More coherent than its predecessor, one reviewer noted the use of soaring synth chords, thundering drums and the use of arpeggio that was reminiscent of the Berlin School. The trilogy was completed in July 2014 with the release of ″Ambient Disaster Movie″, an album of characteristically spacey soundscapes that included samples from old science fiction films.

Between Ultrascope and Ambient Disaster Movie, Frankland also released an album called Lost 1194, which consisted of previously unheard versions of tracks from the Woob debut album.

=== Journeyman ===
In 1994, the year of the first Woob album, Frankland also started recording with DJ Colin Waterton under contract to NTone, a sub label of Ninja Tune. The duo released two albums under the name 'Journeyman'. The first album, 'Mama 6', came out in 1994, featuring long ambient dub soundscapes, with samples of world music and movie dialogue of the kind that could be found on the Woob albums. By contrast, 'National Hijinx', released in 1997, had shorter tracks with elements of drum and bass.

The second album marked the end of Frankland's collaboration with Waterton. When asked about the partnership in an interview, Frankland said "Colin Waterton had lots of influence on the first Journeyman album. The idea was that we'd start a record label as a duo, but it didn't happen. Colin moved on and started concentrating on other stuff. He did work on about three of the songs on 'National Hijinx' though."

=== Max and Harvey ===
In 1998, Frankland started putting out tracks under the name 'Max and Harvey' (alternatively 'Max & Harvey'). The first track, 'Big Amoeba Sound', was a collaboration with Mark Butt (now releasing music with The Dead Sea Sound) who had designed the album cover for the Journeyman album, 'National Hijinx', under the name of Scabboy. The group was named after Mark's dogs (who also appear in the group logo) and the track title was later pluralised to become the name of Frankland's own label 'bigamoebasounds'. The track later appeared on the Xen Cuts compilation album, marking the 10th anniversary of the Ninja Tune label.

Subsequent releases under the name of 'Max and Harvey' were the work of Frankland, although Riad Abji, who had shared a flat with Frankland and Butt, played bass and guitar on a number of early tracks by Woob, Journeyman and Max & Harvey.

Over the next decade, a handful of Max and Harvey tracks appeared on compilation albums released by Ninja Tune and Flying Rhino Records. Two EPs containing both old and new material were released by Bigameobasounds in 2010. With the release of Have Landed in 2012, Frankland announced on his website that "Woob has assimilated Max & Harvey".

== Legacy ==
AllMusic described the first two albums, Woob 1194 and Woob^{2} 4495 as 'among the most praised and encompassing documents of post-rave ambient of the last several years', while the Ambient Music Guide describes them as 'among the most refined, subtle and innovative examples of the meeting between electronics and live instruments that flowered in the ambient environment of the 1990'

With the release of "Return to the City" in November 2011, the Electronic Music Guide described Woob as 'an ambient music genius'. The guide rated the new album 9.9 out of 10 and stated that it was contender for 'soundtrack of the year'. The 2013 release ULTRASCOPE was included in the Ambient Music Guide's selection of Best Albums of the year.

== Discography ==
=== Woob ===
Albums

- Woob 1194 (Em:t Records, Instinct Records US, 1994)
- Woob^{2} 4495 (Em:t Records, 1995)
- Woob 1194 (re-release, Bigamoebasounds, 2009)
- Repurpose (Bigamoebasounds, 2010)
- Return to the City (soundtrack) (Bigamoebasounds, 2011)
- Have Landed (aka Woob1112) (Bigamoebasounds, 2012)
- ULTRASCOPE (aka Woob1113) (Bigamoebasounds, 2013)
- ULTRASCOPE: Time Paradox (Bigamoebasounds,2013)
- Lost 1194 (Bigamoebasounds, 2013)
- Ambient Disaster Movie (aka Woob0014) (Bigamoebasounds, 2014)
- Light and Levitation (Epilogue) (Time Limited, 2015)
- Adaption (Time Limited, 2015)
- Death by Coin-Op (Time Limited, 2016)
- ULTRASCOPE (Deluxe Version) (Bigamoebasounds, 2016)
- Overrun_exe (Isometric, 2016)
- Tokyo Run (Isometric, 2017)
- 新 プログラム (Time Limited, 2018)
- スリープ 研究 プログラム (Time Limited, 2018)
- Tokyo Substrate Paradox (Isometric, 2018)
- Suite 59201 (Time Limited, 2020)
- 1001 (The 00 Collection, 2020)
- 3003 (The 00 Collection, 2020)
- Monochrome 3003 (Em:tted, 2020)
- 2002 (The 00 Collection, 2020)
- Lost Metropolis (Isometric, 2020)
- Xvious_exe (Isometric, 2020)
- Monochrome Xvious_exe (Isometric, 2020)

Compilation albums

- Intervision 1015 (Bigamoebasounds, 2015)
- MXV (Bigamoebasounds, 2015)
- Hypersleep 10 (Bigamoebasounds, 2019)

Singles and EPs

- Planet Woob (cassette-only demo tape, 1993)
- Void, Part 2 (Beeswax Records, 1994)
- Odonna (Bells Mix) Edi (Bigamoebasounds, 2009)
- EP1 (Bigamoebasounds, 2009)
- Giant Stroke (v2) (Bigamoebasounds 2009)
- Unknown Quantity (Bigamoebasounds 2010)
- Paradigm Flux (soundtrack EP) (Bigamoebasounds, 2010)
- Mass Distraction (EP) (Isometric, 2015)
- Tales of Arcadia (Time Limited, 2016)

Compilation appearances

- "Void, Part 1" on Em:t 0094 (Em:t Records, 1994)
- "Pluto" and "Odonna" on Plug In & Turn On x.2 (Instinct Records, 1994)
- "Fourteen 33" on This is Acid Jazz: The Next Step (Instinct Records, 1995)
- "Fourteen Thirtythree" on Em:t 2295 (Em:t Records, 1995)
- "Mould" on Em:t 5595 (Em:t Records, 1995)
- "On Earth (Edit)" on Amberdelic Space (Dressed To Kill Records, 1996)
- "Giant Stroke" on Emit 1197 (Em:t Records, 1997)
- "Deep Chamber" on Hybrids (Hypnagogia, 1998)
- "Dooshta" on Caribbean Eclipse (Flying Rhino Records, 1999)
- "Pondlife" on So Fa (Flying Rhino Records, 2002)
- "Ten Ton Dub" on Skunked on Planet Dub (Dubmission Records, 2010)
- "KanZeOn ReIndication: Woob" on KanZeOn ReIndication (No Label, 2011)
- "Omricon" on Magnatron 2.0 (NewRetroWave Records, 2017)

=== Journeyman ===
- Mama 6 (album, Ntone, 1994)
- National Hijinx (album, Ntone, 1997)
- 50cc (EP, Ntone, 1997)

=== Max & Harvey ===
- Sleep (single, Ninja Tune, 2006)
- Amoeba (EP, Bigamoebasounds, 2010)
- Compendium (EP, Bigamoebasounds, 2011)
- Space Therapy (Woob Remixes) (Album, Bigamoebasounds, 2012)

== See also ==
- List of ambient music artists
