= Celia Green =

British philosopher and psychologist

Celia Elizabeth Green (born 1935) is a British philosopher, psychologist, and parapsychologist.

== Biography ==
Green's parents were both primary school teachers, who together authored a series of geography textbooks which became known as The Green Geographies. Green completed a B.A., M.A., and B. Litt. from Oxford University. She studied psychical research at Trinity College, Cambridge from 1958 to 1960.

From 1957 to 1962, Green held the post of Research Secretary at the Society for Psychical Research in London. In 1961, Green founded and became the Director of the Institute of Psychophysical Research. The Institute's areas of interest were initially listed as philosophy, psychology, theoretical physics, and ESP. However, its principal work during the sixties and seventies concerned hallucinations and other quasi-perceptual experiences. In 1982, while Green was the director, the Institute investigated psychokinetic phenomena.

== Writing ==
In 1968 Green published Lucid Dreams, a study of a phenomenon described by Green as when a dreamer is aware that he or she is dreaming. The possibility of conscious insight during dreams had previously been treated with scepticism by some philosophers and psychologists and scientific skepticism continued after her book was published.

Green collated both previously published first-hand accounts and the results of longitudinal studies of four subjects of her own. In Lucid Dreams, she proposed a correlation between lucid dreams and the rapid eye movement (REM) stage of sleep. Green also raised the possibility of training subjects, lucidly dreaming during sleep, to exercise some control over their motor functions, in order to signal to the experimenter. The correlation with REM sleep was confirmed in 1975 by Keith Hearne, who devised an experiment in which a lucidly dreaming subject signalled to him using a pre-agreed set of eye movements.

In 1968, Green also published a collection of 400 first-hand accounts of out-of-body experiences for the benefit of scientists interested in studying the phenomena.

With Charles McCreery, Green co-authored the 1975 book Apparitions and the 1994 book Lucid Dreaming: The Paradox of Consciousness During Sleep. Apparitions is a taxonomy of 'apparitions', or hallucinations in which the viewpoint of the subject was not ostensibly displaced, based on a collection of 1500 first-hand accounts.

== Scientific reception ==
Green’s research on lucid dreams has been widely recognized by other psychologists. In his historical overview of the field, Stephen LaBerge credited Green’s 1968 book on the subject with providing the foundational conceptual vocabulary and clinical anecdotes that re-energized modern research into the phenomenon.

Sleep researcher Keith Hearne acknowledged that his initial knowledge about lucid dreams directly originated from reading Green’s work.

Psychologist Harry Hunt of Brock University also praised Green’s pioneering research arguing that “her work has offered us the most sophisticated phenomenology we have”.

Neurologist and author Oliver Sacks stated that Green was the first psychologist to systematically examine a large number of cases of out-of-the-body experiences.

== Popular reception ==
Green’s 1969 philosophical critique The Human Evasion received positive attention from national literary figures, with reviewer Philip Toynbee praising it for its ‘sparkle”. French philosopher Michel Adam called it a 'brilliant and judicious essay'.

Her pioneering work on lucid dreams and false awakenings has received popular attention via press articles and radio and TV programmes. She appeared, for example, in a 1983 Radio 4 programme entitled ‘The Dream Makers’, and again in a 1985 episode of the BBC1 Everyman series entitled ‘Dreamscape’.

Green’s book Apparitions received mixed reviews. Kirkus Reviews criticised it for not attempting to verify the phenomena, and regarded ‘the efforts at objective classification’ as ‘minimal’. It was reviewed more favourably by Anthony Powell in The Telegraph, who called it ‘an excellent piece of documentation, soberly treated’.

== Aphorisms ==
Her aphorisms have been published in The Decline and Fall of Science and Advice to Clever Children. Ten are included in the Penguin Dictionary of Epigrams, and three in the Penguin Dictionary of Modern Quotations. They have been cited in broadsheets.

== CDs ==
The CD titled Lucid Dreams 0096, which includes parts of the book Lucid Dreams narrated by Green for the label Em:t, was released in 1995. Earlier Green had contributed a nine-minute track to a compilation CD put out by the same recording label. The track was entitled "In the Extreme" and consisted of readings by the author from her books, The Human Evasion, and Advice to Clever Children.

== Selected works ==
Books

- Lucid Dreams (1968) London: Hamish Hamilton. Reissued 1977, Oxford : Institute of Psychophysical Research .
- Out-of-the-body Experiences (1968) London: Hamish Hamilton. Reissued 1977, Oxford : Institute of Psychophysical Research
- The Human Evasion (1969) London: Hamish Hamilton. Reissued 1977, Oxford: Institute of Psychophysical Research
- The Decline and Fall of Science (1976) London: Hamish Hamilton. Reissued 1977, Oxford: Institute of Psychophysical Research .
- Advice to Clever Children (1981) Oxford : Institute of Psychophysical Research.
- The Lost Cause: Causation and the Mind-Body Problem (2003) Oxford: Oxford Forum.
- Letters from Exile: Observations on a Culture in Decline (2004) Oxford: Oxford Forum.
- The Corpse and the Kingdom (2023) Oxford: Oxford Forum.

with Charles McCreery:

- Apparitions (1975) London: Hamish Hamilton.
- Lucid Dreaming: The Paradox of Consciousness During Sleep (1994) London: Routledge.

Selected papers

- 'Waking dreams and other metachoric experiences', Psychiatric Journal of the University of Ottawa, 15, 1990, pp. 123–128.
- 'Are mental events preceded by their physical causes?' (with Grant Gillett), Philosophical Psychology, 8, 1995, pp. 333–340.
- 'Freedom and the exceptional child', Educational Notes, No. 26, Libertarian Alliance, 1993. Available as an Online PDF
- 'Hindrances to the progress of medical and scientific research', in Medical Science and the Advancement of World Health, ed. R. Lanza, Praeger, New York, 1985.

Translations

- René Sudre. Traité de Parapsychologie, published as Treatise on Parapsychology (1960)
