= Sandor Rado =

Hungarian psychoanalyst

Sandor Rado (Hungarian: Radó Sándor [ˈʃaːndor ˈrɒdoː]; 8 January 1890, Kisvárda – 14 May 1972, New York City) was a Hungarian psychoanalyst of the second generation, who moved to the United States in the 1930s.

According to Peter Gay, "Budapest produced some of the most conspicuous talents in the analytic profession: in addition to Ferenczi, these included Franz Alexander [and Sándor] Radó."

Rado is known for having coined the term "schizotype" in 1956 as an abbreviation of "schizophrenic phenotype". These writings played a foundational role in modern conceptualizations of schizotypy, and the genetic etiology of schizophrenia and psychosis.

== Life ==
Rado was initially trained as a medical doctor. Later Sandor Rado met Sigmund Freud in 1915 and decided to become a psychoanalyst. He was analysed first by a former analysand of Freud, E. Revesz, and then, after his move to Berlin, by Karl Abraham. Among his own distinguished analysands were Wilhelm Reich and "Heinz Hartmann, the most prominent among the ego psychologists."

After the Bolshevist revolution in Hungary, "Rado had some influence with the new masters, and it was he who manoeuvred [...] Ferenczi as the first University Professor of Psycho-analysis." Regime change then led to his move to Berlin, where, after Abraham's death, Ernest Jones suggested Radó (among others) for "replacing him on the [Secret] Committee". Although this did not take place, Radó swiftly "became known as an outstanding theoretician".

In the United States, he was instrumental in the relatively fraught creation of "the Columbia University Center for Psychoanalytic Training and Research, painfully wrested from the New York Psychoanalytic in 1944 by Sandor Rado, in a savage schism." Thereafter, "once an active member of the central governing body of psychoanalysis, Rado now lived on the fringes of the organisation".

== Writings ==
Sandor Rado was "a lucid scholar and a concise writer in his chosen field. Among his collected papers, none is longer than twenty pages – unusual for a psychoanalyst – [...] clarity."

=== Early writings ===
Radó published eleven psychoanalytic papers between 1919 and 1942. Perhaps the most important of them was the 1927 article on 'The Problem of Melancholia', which "brought solutions to certain important and pertinent problems still unclarified". Otto Fenichel considered that "the paper by Rado [1928] unmasked the self-reproaches as an ambivalent ingratiation of (the object and ) the superego", and that "the differentiation of the 'good' (i.e., protecting) and the 'bad' (i.e., punishing) aspects of the superego was used for clarification of the aims of the depressive mechanisms."

Radó also wrote seminal papers on the question of addiction: "His concept of 'alimentary orgasm', which replaced genital supremacy in pharmocothymia, has been widely quoted." Radó saw the roots of addictive personalities in attempts to "satisfy the archaic oral longing which is sexual longing, a need for security, and a need for maintenance of self-esteem simultaneously [...] their partners [...] are nothing else for them but deliverers of supplies."

=== Adaptational psychodynamics ===
Radó's work "culminates in his writings on 'adaptational psychodynamics', [...] a concise reformulation of what has come to be known as ego analysis".

In them he "criticizes the exclusive preoccupation of the therapist with the patient's past and the neglect of his present", among other matters: "on all these points Rado was way ahead of his time."

However, in those late writings, "one of his colleagues fe[lt] that Rado has introduced unnecessary neologisms for [...] traditionally sanctioned terms, for example, 'hedonic self-regulation' for 'pleasure principle'," thereby further contributing to his professional isolation.
