= Schizotypy =

Concept of personality states ranging from imaginative to psychotic

In psychology, schizotypy is a theoretical concept that posits a continuum of personality characteristics and experiences, ranging from normal dissociative, imaginative states to extreme states of mind related to psychosis, especially schizophrenia. The continuum of personality proposed in schizotypy is in contrast to a categorical view of psychosis, wherein psychosis is considered a particular (usually pathological) state of mind, which the person either has or does not have.

== Development of the concept ==
The categorical view of psychosis is most associated with Emil Kraepelin, who created criteria for the medical diagnosis and classification of different forms of psychotic illness. Particularly, he made the distinction between dementia praecox (now called schizophrenia), manic depressive insanity and non-psychotic states. Modern diagnostic systems used in psychiatry (such as the DSM) maintain this categorical view.

In contrast, psychiatrist Eugen Bleuler did not believe there was a clear separation between sanity and madness, believing instead that psychosis was simply an extreme expression of thoughts and behaviours that could be present to varying degrees throughout the population.

The concept of psychosis as a spectrum was further developed by psychologists such as Hans Eysenck and Gordon Claridge, who sought to understand unusual variations in thought and behaviour in terms of personality theory. Eysenck conceptualised cognitive and behavioral variations as all together forming a single personality trait, psychoticism.

Meehl et al. 1964 first coined the term 'schizotypy,' and through examination of unusual experiences in the general population and clustering of symptoms in individuals diagnosed with schizophrenia. The work of Claridge suggested that this personality trait was more complex than had been previously thought and could be broken down into four factors.

1. Unusual experiences: The disposition to have unusual perceptual and other cognitive experiences, such as hallucinations, magical or superstitious belief and interpretation of events (see also delusions). This factor is also often referred to as "positive schizotypy" and "cognitive-perceptual" schizotypy
2. Cognitive disorganization: A tendency for thoughts to become derailed, disorganised or tangential (see also formal thought disorder). This factor is also often referred to as "disorganized schizotypy"
3. Introverted anhedonia: A tendency to introverted, emotionally flat and asocial behaviour, associated with a deficiency in the ability to feel pleasure from social and physical stimulation. This factor is also often referred to as "negative schizotypy" and "schizoidia"
4. Impulsive nonconformity: The disposition to unstable mood and behaviour particularly with regard to rules and social conventions.

== The relationship between schizotypy, mental health and mental illness ==
Although aiming to reflect some of the features present in diagnosable mental illness, schizotypy does not necessarily imply that someone who is more schizotypal than someone else is more ill. For example, certain aspects of schizotypy may be beneficial. Both the unusual experiences and cognitive disorganisation aspects have been linked to creativity and artistic achievement. Jackson proposed the concept of 'benign schizotypy' in relation to certain classes of religious experience, which he suggested might be regarded as a form of problem-solving and therefore of adaptive value. The link between positive schizotypy and certain facets of creativity is consistent with the notion of a "healthy schizotypy", which may account for the persistence of schizophrenia-related genes in the population despite their many dysfunctional aspects. The extent of schizotypy can be measured using certain diagnostic tests, such as the O-LIFE.

However, the exact nature of the relationship between schizotypy and diagnosable psychotic illness is still controversial. One of the key concerns that researchers have had is that questionnaire-based measures of schizotypy, when analysed using factor analysis, do not suggest that schizotypy is a unified, homogeneous concept. The three main approaches have been labelled as 'quasi-dimensional', 'dimensional' and 'fully dimensional'.

Each approach is sometimes used to imply that schizotypy reflects a cognitive or biological vulnerability to psychosis, although this may remain dormant and never express itself, unless triggered by appropriate environmental events or conditions (such as certain doses of drugs or high levels of stress).

=== Quasi-dimensional approach ===
The quasi-dimensional model may be traced back to Bleuler (the inventor of the term 'schizophrenia'), who commented on two types of continuity between normality and psychosis: that between the schizophrenic and their relatives, and that between the patient's premorbid and post-morbid personalities (i.e. their personality before and after the onset of overt psychosis).

On the first score he commented: 'If one observes the relatives of our patients, one often finds in them peculiarities which are qualitatively identical with those of the patients themselves, so that the disease appears to be only a quantitative increase of the anomalies seen in the parents and siblings.'

On the second point, Bleuler discusses in a number of places whether peculiarities displayed by the patient before admission to hospital should be regarded as premonitory symptoms of the disease or merely indications of a predisposition to develop it.

Despite these observations of continuity Bleuler himself remained an advocate of the disease model of schizophrenia. To this end he invoked a concept of latent schizophrenia, writing: 'In [the latent] form, we can see in nuce [in a nutshell] all the symptoms and all the combinations of symptoms which are present in the manifest types of the disease.'

Later advocates of the quasi-dimensional view of schizotypy are Rado and Meehl, according to both of whom schizotypal symptoms merely represent less explicitly expressed manifestations of the underlying disease process which is schizophrenia. Rado proposed the term 'schizotype' to describe the person whose genetic make-up gave them a lifelong predisposition to schizophrenia.

The quasi-dimensional model is so called because the only dimension it postulates is that of gradations of severity or explicitness in relation to the symptoms of a disease process: namely schizophrenia.

=== Dimensional approach ===
The dimensional approach, influenced by personality theory, argues that full blown psychotic illness is just the most extreme end of the schizotypy spectrum and there is a natural continuum between people with low and high levels of schizotypy. This model is most closely associated with the work of Hans Eysenck, who regarded the person exhibiting the full-blown manifestations of psychosis as simply someone occupying the extreme upper end of his 'psychoticism' dimension.

Support for the dimensional model comes from the fact that high-scorers on measures of schizotypy may meet, or partially fulfill, the diagnostic criteria for schizophrenia spectrum disorders, such as schizophrenia, schizoaffective disorder, schizoid personality disorder and schizotypal personality disorder. Similarly, when analyzed, schizotypy traits often break down into similar groups as do symptoms from schizophrenia (although they are typically present in much less intense forms).

=== Fully dimensional approach ===
Claridge calls the latest version of his model 'the fully dimensional approach'. However, it might also be characterised as the hybrid or composite approach, as it incorporates elements of both the disease model and the dimensional one.

On this latest Claridge model, schizotypy is regarded as a dimension of personality, normally distributed throughout the population, as in the Eysenck model. However, schizophrenia itself is regarded as a breakdown process, quite distinct from the continuously distributed trait of schizotypy, and forming a second, graded continuum, ranging from schizotypal personality disorder to full-blown schizophrenic psychosis.

The model is characterised as fully dimensional because, not only is the personality trait of schizotypy continuously graded, but the independent continuum of the breakdown processes is also graded rather than categorical.

The fully dimensional approach argues that full blown psychosis is not just high schizotypy, but must involve other factors that make it qualitatively different and pathological.

Recent evolutionary models support a fully dimensional view of schizotypy. This framework posits schizotypy as a multifaceted continuum. Within this continuum, the phylogenetic evolution of the social brain and the coexistence of traits like openness to experience and introversion are associated with both fitness advantages (such as creativity) and an increased risk for schizotypal symptoms. Severe forms of schizotypy, consequently, represent a failure to integrate individual creativity within a social species.

== Relationship to other personality traits and sociodemographics ==
Many research studies have examined the relationship between schizotypy and various standard models of personality, such as the five factor model. Research has linked the unusual experiences factor to high neuroticism and openness to experience. Unusual experience in combination with positive affectivity also appears to predict religiosity/spirituality. One study found that a moderate level of unusual experiences predicted increased religiosity, but a high level of unusual experiences predicted lower religiosity, and that impulsive non-conformity was associated with lower religiosity, as well as lower values of tradition and conformity. The introvertive anhedonia factor has been linked to high neuroticism and low extraversion. The cognitive disorganisation factor as well as the impulsive non-conformity factor have been linked to low conscientiousness. It has been argued that these findings provide evidence for a fully dimensional model of schizotypy and that there is a continuum between normal personality and schizotypy.

Relationships between schizotypy and the Temperament and Character Inventory have also been examined. Self-transcendence, a trait associated with openness to "spiritual" ideas and experiences, has moderate positive associations with schizotypy, particularly with unusual experiences. Cloninger described the specific combination of high self-transcendence, low cooperativeness, and low self-directedness as a "schizotypal personality style" and research has found that this specific combination of traits is associated with a "high risk" of schizotypy. Low cooperativeness and self-directedness combined with high self-transcendence may result in openness to odd or unusual ideas and behaviours associated with distorted perceptions of reality. On the other hand, high levels of cooperativeness and self-directedness may protect against the schizotypal tendencies associated with high self-transcendence.

One study examined the relationship between the dimensional MBTI scales, and found that schizotypy was associated with a tendency toward introversion, intuition (as opposed to sensing), thinking (as opposed to feeling), and prospecting (as opposed to judging), which can be represented by the "INTP" personality type in the MBTI model. Intuition is conceptually similar to the Big Five "openness to experience" trait which is thought to be increased in schizotypy, thinking represents the tendency to prefer objectivity and evidence in making decisions and forming beliefs and is conceptually similar to the lower level "intellect" factor of openness in the Big Five, and prospecting is conceptually similar to low conscientiousness in the Big Five.

Schizotypy shows positive associations with traits that are associated with fast life history strategies, including increased sociosexuality (characterized by increased effort for short term sexual relationships, lower effort for long term sexual relationships, increased total amount of sexual partners, and lower sexual disgust) and impulsivity.

=== Personality disorders ===
Schizotypy shows positive associations with overall psychopathy, however when considering the primary and secondary factors of psychopathy, schizotypy is associated with lower primary psychopathy (also called fearless dominance) and higher secondary psychopathy (also called self-centered impulsivity, or disinhibition). Narcissism is negatively associated with schizotypy, (though persons high in schizotypy may experience grandiose delusions along with idionomia, a sense of deviance and enlightenment, which may be mistaken for narcissism), and borderline personality traits are positively associated with schizotypy as well hypomanic personality traits. Schizotypy also shows positive relationships with schizoid, paranoid, and avoidant personality traits, and a negative relationship with obsessive-compulsive personality traits (particularly with disorganized schizotypy). In contrast to obsessive-compulsive personality disorder, obsessive-compulsive disorder shows a positive relationship with schizotypy.

=== Cognitive function ===
There is evidence that schizotypy correlates with differentially enhanced and impaired aspects of cognitive function. These findings include schizotypy being positively associated with enhanced global processing over local processing, lower latent inhibition, attention & memory deficits, enhanced creativity & imagination, and enhanced associative thinking.

=== Autism ===
Correlational studies of schizotypy and autistic traits tend to find positive correlations, most strongly with negative schizotypy, to a lesser extent disorganized schizotypy, and weak, absent, or negative correlations with positive schizotypy. Diagnosed schizophrenia and autism spectrum disorder (ASD) also overlap statistically.

However, several researchers have suggested that positive correlations between schizotypy and autism are not necessarily evidence of overlap, but rather are due to a lack of specificity of measurements for autistic and schizotypal traits, and the confounding variable of social difficulties and social-cognitive dysfunction which occur in both autism and schizotypy. Researchers have suggested that high comorbidity between diagnosed ASD and schizophrenia are highly unreliable and misleading due to a severe inadequacy of the DSM and diagnostic interviews for differential diagnosis. Studies which show apparent overlap between the causes of autism and the causes of schizotypy also have significant methodological issues.

Multiple evolutionary theories of schizotypy place schizotypy and autistic traits at opposite poles of a continuum, with relation to traits such as theory of mind, life history and mating strategies, "mentalistic" or creative cognition and "mechanistic" cognition, and predictive processing. In agreement with this, schizotypy (particularly positive, impulsive, and disorganized schizotypy) shows a negative association with autistic traits when controlling for social difficulty, which has been well replicated across different countries, scales, methods, and independent research teams, and a diametric autism-schizotypy continuum factor emerges through factor analysis. Notably, some studies find a direct negative association with positive schizotypy and autistic traits even when social difficulty is not controlled for.

Some researchers have interpreted these findings as indicating that autistic and schizotypal traits are both overlapping and diametrical in different aspects, with autistic social difficulties and negative schizotypal symptoms being a shared dimension, and positive, disorganized, and impulsive schizotypy as a dimension that is diametrically opposed to autism.

== Possible biological bases of schizotypy ==
=== Cognitive imbalances and tradeoffs ===
==== Predictive processing ====
Andersen (2022) put forth a model of schizotypy based on the predictive processing framework, where lower importance is attributed to sensory prediction errors for updating beliefs in individuals with high schizotypy. Essentially, this means that schizotypy is a cognitive-perceptual specialization for processing chaotic and noisy data, where patterns and relationships exist but can only be detected if minor inconsistencies are ignored (i.e., focusing on the 'big picture'). Andersen suggests that a tradeoff exists in predictive processing, where giving higher weight to prediction errors prevents the detection of false patterns (i.e. apophenia) at the cost of being unable to detect higher level patterns, and giving lower weight to prediction errors allows for the detection of higher level patterns at the cost of occasionally detecting patterns that don't exist, as in delusions and hallucinations that occur in schizotypy. This model explains features of schizotypy and previous models of schizotypy, such as the hyper-mentalizing model originally proposed by Abu-Akel (1999), hyper-associative cognition, the hyper-imagination model by Crespi (2016), antagonomia (acting in ways directly opposing societal values) and idiosyncratic worldviews, attentional differences such as latent inhibition, hyper-openness, increased exploratory behavior, and enhanced cognitive abilities in insight problem solving, creativity, and global processing.

=== Hormone abnormalities ===
==== Oxytocin and testosterone ====
There is some evidence to suggest that abnormalities in the regulation of oxytocin and testosterone are related to schizotypy. Crespi (2015) provides evidence that schizophrenia and related disorders may involve increased or dysregulated oxytocin, and relatively decreased testosterone, leading to "hyper-developed" social cognition, although Crespi's model of schizotypy has been criticized. Evidence for oxytocin's role in schizotypy includes genes associated with higher oxytocin levels being associated with higher levels of positive schizotypy, blood oxytocin levels positively associated with schizotypy in females, ratio of genes associated with low testosterone and high oxytocin positively associated with schizotypy and negatively with autistic traits, oxytocin levels being associated with higher social anxiety, and oxytocin being associated with global processing, divergent thinking, and creativity, which are also strongly associated with schizotypy.

=== Anhedonia ===
Anhedonia, or a reduced ability to experience pleasure, is a feature of full-blown schizophrenia that was commented on by both Kraepelin and Bleuler. However, they regarded it as just one among a number of features that tended to characterise the 'deterioration', as they saw it, of the schizophrenic's emotional life. In other words, it was an effect, rather than a cause, of the disease process.

Rado reversed this way of thinking, and ascribed anhedonia a causal role. He considered that the crucial neural deficit in the schizotype was an 'integrative pleasure deficiency', i.e. an innate deficiency in the ability to experience pleasure. Meehl took on this view, and attempted to relate this deficiency to abnormality in the dopamine system in the brain, which is implicated in the human reward system.

Questionnaire research on schizotypy in normal subjects is ambiguous with regard to the causal role, if any, of anhedonia. Nettle and McCreery and Claridge found that high schizotypes as measured by factor 1 (above) scored lower than controls on the introverted anhedonia factor, as if they were particularly enjoying life.

Various writers, including Kelley and Coursey and L.J. and J.P. Chapman suggest that anhedonia, if present as a pre-existent trait in a person, may act as a potentiating factor, whereas a high capacity for hedonic enjoyment might act as a protecting one.

=== Evolutionary Perspectives ===
Within evolutionary psychology and evolutionary psychiatry, schizotypy is viewed as part of a spectrum of variation potentially maintained by evolutionary trade-offs rather than as purely maladaptive. Moderate expressions of schizotypal traits—such as divergent thinking, unusual associations, or social intuition—may have conferred adaptive advantages related to creativity, exploration, or mating success, even though extreme forms can lead to functional impairment or psychosis. Hypotheses including sexual selection models, the imprinted brain hypothesis, and life-history theory suggest that schizotypy may represent one pole of an evolved cognitive continuum, balanced by opposite traits such as autism. Alternatively, it has been postulated that schizotypy evolves into a maladaptive state through a broader multi-trait personality framework; specifically, psychopathology may emerge from the synergistic interaction of elevated openness to experience and introversion, exacerbated by chronic developmental stress or neglect These accounts propose that selection pressures preserved schizotypal traits through their benefits in communication and innovation, offsetting costs at the pathological extreme.

=== Weakness of inhibitory mechanisms ===
==== Negative priming ====
Negative priming is "the ability of a preceding stimulus to inhibit the response to a subsequent stimulus." Individuals diagnosed with schizophrenia or schizotypy exhibit "reduced or abolished NP [negative priming], especially in the presence of positive symptomatology, acute psychosis, high severity of symptoms, and/or lack of medication."

==== Semantic activation without conscious identification ====
The phenomenon of semantic activation without conscious identification (SAWCI) is said to be displayed when a person shows a priming effect from the processing of consciously undetectable words. For example, a person who has just been shown the word 'giraffe', but at a speed at which he or she was not able consciously to report what it was, may nevertheless identify more quickly than usual another animal word on the next trial. Evans found that high schizotypes showed a greater priming effect than controls in such a situation. She argued that this could be accounted for by a relative weakness of inhibitory mechanisms in the semantic networks of high schizotypes.

==== Attention, working memory, and executive functions ====
Schizotypy symptoms have been related to deficits in executive functions, which entails the psychological processes that supersede habitual inclinations with novel responses and behaviors to fulfill important goals. In particular, when schizotypy is elevated, the ability to filter out task-irrelevant stimuli may be impaired. That is, participants who score highly on schizotypy tend to fail to ignore a previously preexposed, non-reinforced stimulus as compared to a non-preexposed, novel and potentially important event.

Enhanced performance on verbal fluency has been associated with high levels of positive schizotypy, i.e. increased reports of hallucination-like experiences, delusional ideation, and perceptual aberrations. However, decreased performance was associated with negative schizotypy, such as anhedonia.

Many studies have also shown that individuals who exhibit schizotypy features demonstrate deficits in attention and working memory.

=== Abnormalities of arousal ===
Claridge suggested that one consequence of a weakness of inhibitory mechanisms in high schizotypes and schizophrenics might be a relative failure of homeostasis in the central nervous system. It was proposed that this could lead to both lability of arousal and dissociation of arousal in different parts of the nervous system.

==== Dissociation of different arousal systems ====
Claridge and co-workers have found various types of abnormal co-variation between different psychophysiological variables in schizotypes, including between measures of cortical and autonomic arousal.

McCreery and Claridge found evidence of a relative activation of the right cerebral hemisphere as compared with the left in high schizotypes attempting to induce a hallucinatory episode in the laboratory. This suggested a relative dissociation of arousal between the two hemispheres in such people as compared with controls.

==== Hyperarousal ====
A failure of homeostasis in the central nervous system could lead to episodes of hyper-arousal. Oswald has pointed out that extreme stress and hyper-arousal can lead to sleep as a provoked reaction. McCreery has suggested that this could account for the phenomenological similarities between Stage 1 sleep and psychosis, which include hallucinations, delusions, and flattened or inappropriate affect (emotions). On this model, high schizotypes and schizophrenics are people who are liable to what Oswald calls 'micro-sleeps', or intrusions of Stage 1 sleep phenomena into waking consciousness, on account of their tendency to high arousal.

In support of this view McCreery points to the high correlation that has been found to exist between scores on the Chapmans' Perceptual Aberration scale, which measures proneness to perceptual anomalies such as hallucinations, and the Chapmans' Hypomania scale, which measures a tendency to episodes of heightened arousal. This correlation is found despite the fact that there is no overlap of item content between the two scales.

In the clinical field there is also the paradoxical finding of Stevens and Darbyshire, that schizophrenic patients exhibiting the symptom of catatonia can be aroused from their apparent stupor by the administration of sedative rather than stimulant drugs. They wrote: 'The psychic state in catatonic schizophrenia can be described as one of great excitement (i.e., hyperalertness)[...] The inhibition of activity apparently does not alter the inner seething excitement.'

It is argued that such a view would be consistent with the model that suggests schizophrenics and high schizotypes are people with a tendency to hyper-arousal.

==== Aberrant salience hypothesis ====
Kapur (2003) proposed that a hyperdopaminergic state, at a "brain" level of description, leads to an aberrant assignment of salience to the elements of one's experience, at a "mind" level. Dopamine mediates the conversion of the neural representation of an external stimulus from a neutral bit of information into an attractive or aversive entity, i.e. a salient event. Symptoms of schizophrenia and schizotypy may arise out of 'the aberrant assignment of salience to external objects and internal representations'; and antipsychotic medications may reduce positive symptoms by attenuating aberrant motivational salience, via blockade of the Dopamine D2 receptors (Kapur, 2003). There is no evidence however on a link between attentional irregularities and enhanced stimulus salience in schizotypy.

== See also ==
- Apophenia – Tendency to perceive connections between unrelated things
- Apparitional experience – Anomalous experience in parapsychology
- Hallucination – Perception that only seems real
- Hallucinations in the sane
- Pareidolia – Perception of meaningful patterns or images in random or vague stimuli
- Schizothymia – Temperament related to schizophrenia
- Psychosis – Abnormal condition of the mind
- Psychoticism – Personality trait
- Schizoaffective disorder – Mental disorder
- Schizophrenia – Mental disorder with psychotic symptoms
- Schizophrenia spectrum – Mental disorder that encompasses a range of similar conditions
- Schizotypal personality disorder – Mental disorder involving eccentricity and social isolation in afflicted individuals
- Transliminality – Parapsychology concept
- Anhedonia – Inability to feel pleasure
