= Omega (journal) =

- Discipline: Death
- Language: English
- Edited by: Kenneth J. Doka

Publication details
- History: 1970-present
- Publisher: SAGE Publications
- Frequency: 8/year
- Impact factor: 2.854 (2021)

Standard abbreviations
- ISO 4: Omega
- NLM: Omega (Westport)

Indexing
- CODEN: OMGABX
- ISSN: 0030-2228 (print); 1541-3764 (web)
- OCLC no.: 01761236

Links
- Journal homepage; Online access; Online archive

Omega (stylized OMEGA, full titles: OMEGA – Journal of Death and Dying and Omega: An International Journal for the Study of Dying, Death, Bereavement, Suicide, and Other Lethal Behaviors) is a peer-reviewed academic journal covering all aspects of the study of death and dying. It is a multidisciplinary journal, covering disciplines including psychology, sociology, and anthropology.

It was established in 1970 and is published eight times per year by SAGE Publications. It is the official journal of the Center for Psychological Studies of Dying, Death, and Lethal Behavior at Wayne State University. The editor-in-chief is Kenneth J. Doka (College of New Rochelle). According to the Journal Citation Reports, the journal has a 2017 impact factor of 0.87, ranking it 94th out of 135 journals in the category "Psychology, Multidisciplinary" and 36th out of 42 in the category "Social Sciences, Biomedical".
