= Lucid Dreams 0096 =

Lucid Dreams

Studio album by 0096/ Lucid Dreams
- Released: January 1996
- Recorded: Square Centre Studios
- Genre: Electronic music, Ambient music
- Label: Em:t Records
- Producer: Tom Smyth

Lucid Dreams 0096 is a 1996 ambient album, on the em:t label. It is credited to "0096", but this is merely the sequential catalogue number of the disc, labelled in em:t’s house style – the actual instrumentation on the album was provided by Miasma and Bad Data, two em:t artists.

== Origins ==
Writer, philosopher and psychologist Celia Green had already recorded one track for the em:t label – "In the Extreme", which was featured on 1995's 2295 compilation. A quote from Green also featured on the CD's sleevenotes. "In the Extreme" featured Green reading extracts and epithets from her books The Human Evasion and Advice to Clever Children. Em:t judged the track to have enough merit to commission an entire album featuring Green, with an overarching theme, and thus Lucid Dreams was created.

== Overview ==
The album includes Celia Green reading extracts from her book Lucid Dreams, as well as some new material. Green describes the phenomenon of lucid dreaming and its many aspects; its relation to waking life and perception, its erotic possibilities, relation to nightmares, and so forth. Interspersed among these are instances of actual dreams, read out by voice artists.

The example dreams included are often from well-known or notable people, including Oliver Fox, Ernst Mach and Marie-Jean-Léon, Marquis d'Hervey de Saint Denys. Both Fox and d’Hervey de Saint Denys were very interested in dreams and dreaming, and both experienced fully lucid dreams.

The instrumentation and vocal effects that create the album's unique atmosphere were the work of Chris Allen, Will Joss, Tom Smyth and David Thompson, and the album was constructed by recording Green's narrative and the "case studies" at the Institute for Psychophysical research in Oxford, with the ambient music, noise and soundscapes added later at Square Centre studios in Nottingham. The recordings all took place in 1995. One of the two male voices reciting the anecdotal case studies is that of Will Joss, the sound engineer of the album and a lynchpin of much of em:t's output.

In common with all other em:t releases, the album's cover is a library photograph of an animal, courtesy of The Designers Republic – in this case, an extreme close-up of the eye of a parrotfish.

== Track list ==
1. "Lucidity"
2. "Prelucid Dreams"
3. "False Awakenings"
4. "Out-of-the-Body Experiences"
5. "Dream Control and Erotic Possibilities"
6. "Achieving Lucidity"
7. "Health Warning"
8. "Nightmares"
9. "Extrasensory Perception"
10. "Implications"

== Reception ==
The album was reviewed in New Scientist, and the New Statesman.

== Influence ==
Celia Green's Lucid Dreams was the first book of scientific study of lucid dreaming. The album can be seen as a continuation of that work. As a result of Green and McCreery's original study, lucid dreams have become a legitimate field of research, and the apparent logic governing lucid dreaming has been absorbed into popular culture. The rules of lucid dreaming (how one can tell if one is dreaming, what one is able to do in a dream) laid down in movies such as Inception, for instance, are very similar to Green’s methods detailed here.

Like most other em:t releases, Lucid Dreams is no longer in print, and copies fetch exaggeratedly high prices on auction sites such as eBay.
