= NGC 1194 =

Galaxy in the constellation Cetus

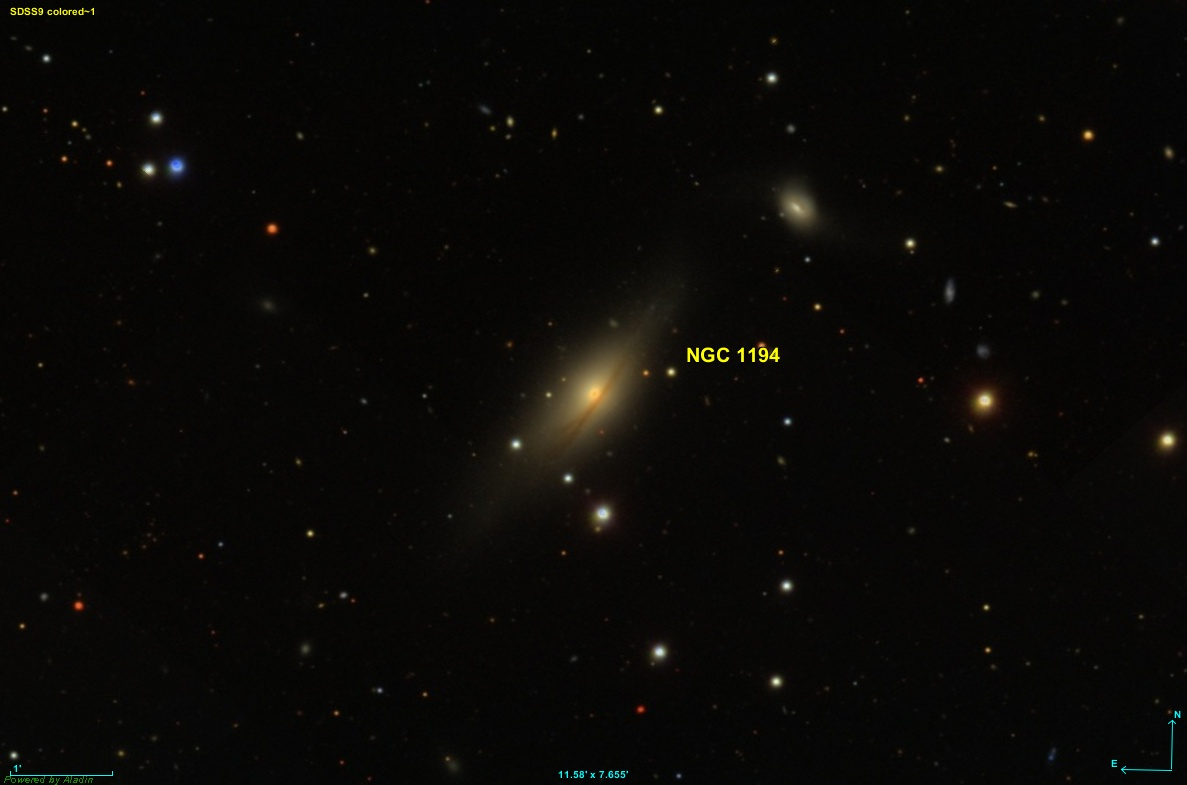
- The lenticular galaxy NGC 1194.

Observation data (J2000 epoch)
- Constellation: Cetus
- Right ascension: 03^{h} 03^{m} 49.10^{s}
- Declination: −01° 06′ 13.37″
- Redshift: 0.013631
- Heliocentric radial velocity: 4086 ± 2
- Distance: 196.2 ± 13.7 Mly (60.14 ± 4.21 Mpc)
- Apparent magnitude (V): 13.0

Characteristics
- Type: SA0+:;Sy1 Sy2
- Size: ~110,000 ly (33.7 kpc) (estimated)

Other designations
- PGC 11537, UGC 2514, CGCG 389-068, IRAS 03012-0117, MCG +00-08-078

NGC 1194 is a lenticular galaxy located in the constellation of Cetus. The redshift of the galaxy is (z) 0.013 and it was first discovered by the French astronomer named Édouard Stephan in 1883, whom he described it as both faint and small object with a bright center. It is also classified as a Seyfert type 2 galaxy and such contains a megamaser.

== Description ==
NGC 1194 is categorized as an inclined galaxy of type S0 with its position angle orientated at 145°. The nucleus of this galaxy has been found as active and the nuclear spectrum is shown to contain strong signatures of stellar absorption features suggesting the galaxy had undergone a recent wave of star formation. Although classified as a Seyfert Type 1 galaxy, this was later reclassified as a Seyfert Type 2 galaxy. Other studies categorized it as a Type 1.9 Seyfert galaxy instead. It has a megamaser, with its disk shown to have an inclination angle of 85° and a kinematic position angle of around 337°. The disk is also depicted as extremely large with both an outer and inner radius of 0.51 and 1.33 parsecs respectively.

Observations made with Hubble Space Telescope has also found there is also radio emission present in the galaxy, described as slightly extended along the position angle of 236°. O III imaging found traces of line emission that is mainly displaced on the western side from the nucleus with two blob features separated by 0.6 arcseconds. Further evidence also discovered streams of interstellar gas towards its companion, suggesting the galaxy might have interacted with it.

A study published in 2001 has discovered the continuum of the galaxy has a reddened appearance. When observed, it is likely to originate from either extinction by the stellar population or interstellar dust that has been emitted out by its own active galactic nucleus. The central supermassive black hole of NGC 1194 is also found to be the largest in any of the megamaser galaxies, with a mass of around 6.5 ± 0.4 × 10^{7} M_{☉}.
