= Oxford–Liverpool Inventory of Feelings and Experiences =

The Oxford–Liverpool Inventory of Feelings and Experiences (O-LIFE) is a questionnaire for measuring psychosis-proneness, principally schizotypy. It was introduced in 1995 and has since been used in a variety of experimental and clinical studies. The O-LIFE is a tool with 104 items in the Yes/No response format, although a shorter version (sO-LIFE) can be used as well with only 43 items. It has been used, for instance, in several studies assessing schizotypy in relation to Kamin blocking.
