= Woob 1194 =

1194

Studio album by Woob
- Released: August 1994
- Studio: Square Centre Studios
- Genres: Ambient dub, ambient
- Length: 72:50
- Label: Em:t Records
- Producer: Paul Frankland

Professional ratings
Review scores
Source	Rating
AllMusic	4.5/5 stars

Woob 1194 is the debut album of British musician Paul "Woob" Frankland. It was recorded over the span of two months and was released in the summer of 1994 on Em:t Records. It was also re-released in late 1994 on Instinct Records in the United States. It was Em:t's second release.

== Overview ==
The album blends together elements of ambient, dub, and world music into long pieces, combined with samples from field recordings, movies and television shows such as Quantum Leap and Star Trek. The cover art depicts several emperor penguins in the wild, and they can also be heard near the end of final track of the album, "Emperor". Like all other Em:t recordings, the album was made available only as a CD digipak.

== Composition and music ==
=== "On Earth" ===
At 31:59, this is the longest track on the album. "On Earth" mixes rhythms and voices from around the world with clips of dialogue from TV shows and numerous natural sounds, such as birds. The track also contains live instrumentation - Frankland improvised the synth solo (heard from 27:23 – 28:46) during recording; he has said this is now his favourite part of the album.

The sample beginning at 5:25 comes from the 1992 episode "Killin' Time" of the TV series Quantum Leap, and features the voices of Deborah Pratt as Ziggy and Dean Stockwell as Al Calavicci.

The second, larger vocal sample at 15:48 comes from the 1974 BBC album English With an Accent by Peter Hunt.

The repeated plucked-string melody that recurs throughout the track is a version of Camille Saint-Saëns' "Introduction and Rondo Capriccioso" which originally featured in the soundtrack to Sergei Parajanov's film Ašik Kerib. This film was also a source for many of the vocal samples, including the female chanting at the start of the track, and the male chanting at the very end.

=== "Odonna" ===
One of Frankland's two personal favourites of the tracks on 1194, Odonna is mostly built around two samples - one an interview with classical cellist Yo Yo Ma, and the second a sample of dialogue from The Mark of Gideon, an episode of the original series of Star Trek, which features the voices of Sharon Acker and William Shatner. The track is named for Acker's character in the episode, though it is spelt differently. Frankland spent five hours making the vocal loop on an Akai S1000 “so that it didn’t click!”

=== "Amoeba" ===
Amoeba is the shortest track on the album, and is notable for the harmonica solo, reminiscent of the soundtrack to Betty Blue, and the sample of frogs croaking en masse as the track fades. This is not the only Woob recording to end in this fashion, the other being the track "Fourteen Thirty Three" from the Em:t 2295 compilation.

=== "Wuub" ===
A simple drumbeat and vocal sample build to a crescendo. The track opens with a quote from the 1971 film Night of Dark Shadows. The second Woob album would continue the pattern of featuring a track referencing the band's name, featuring a track called "Woobed". Frankland almost removed the track from the album entirely, as it "seemed too nice" .

In November 2011, "Wuub" was used on the television show James May's Man Lab, during a segment detailing the helium-balloon funerals of two household pets. The track was used during footage showing the earth from the upper reaches of the atmosphere. More recently, in January 2020, it was also used in the analog horror web series Gemini Home Entertainment, specifically appearing in the episode "Our Solar System".

=== "Strange Air" ===
Built around a long dialogue sample (once again, from Night of Dark Shadows), the track is the darkest and most ominous on the album, culminating in a blood-curdling scream at 3:32. Frankland has said that, during recording, nine passes were made at this track, all of them different. One of the alternate takes of "Strange Air" - titled "Pluto" - ended up on the 1994 compilation album Plug In & Turn On x.2.

=== "Emperor" ===
The deepest of bass notes underpins samples of the unearthly sounds made by emperor penguins in the wild. These creatures can also be seen on the album's cover. Frankland claims that this was a coincidence, with Em:t records providing the image after the track was recorded and named.

== Track listing ==
All tracks are written by Paul Frankland.

No.	Title	Length
1.	"On Earth"	31:59
2.	"Odonna"	13:23
3.	"Amoeba"	1:34
4.	"Wuub"	9:38
5.	"Strange Air"	10:24
6.	"Emperor"	5:53
Total length:		72:50

== Lost 1194 ==
In December 2013, some of the original takes from the recording sessions at em:t's Square Centre Studios in 1994 were remixed and released as an album in their own right, entitled Lost 1194. All of the tracks were alternate takes of the tracks included on the finished 1994 album, with the track listing running as per the original release, but with each title preceded by the word "Lost": "Lost On Earth", "Lost Odonna", etc. As with all of Woob's 21st century releases, Lost 1194 was made available in a variety of formats, and as a download via Paul Frankland's Bandcamp site.

Lost 1194 featured cover artwork by French concept artist and illustrator Florian de Gesincourt; echoing the Antarctic theme of the original "Emperor Penguin" cover of 1194, this depicted an explorer reaching a vast ice crevasse.
