= Gordon Claridge =

British psychologist and author

Gordon Sidney Claridge was a British psychologist and author, best known for his theoretical and empirical work on the concept of schizotypy or psychosis-proneness.

== Biography ==
Claridge took his first degree in Psychology at University College, London, in 1953. His PhD work was at the Institute of Psychiatry, London, jointly supervised by Hans Eysenck and Neil O’Connor. He qualified under in-service training as a clinical psychologist, and from 1957-61 worked as Eysenck’s Research Assistant, based in the Royal Victoria Military Hospital, Netley, Southampton.

Claridge then moved to Bristol as Head of Clinical Psychology at Barrow Hospital and part-time lecturer in the Bristol University Department of Psychology. From 1964-74 he ran the Glasgow University clinical psychology training course as (eventually) Reader in Clinical Psychology. He was awarded a DSc from Glasgow University in 1971.

In 1974 Claridge moved to Oxford as University Lecturer in Abnormal Psychology at the Department of Experimental Psychology and Fellow of Magdalen College. For the first five years of this appointment he ran the Oxford University clinical psychology training course.

He was Emeritus Professor of Abnormal Psychology at Oxford University and Emeritus Fellow of Magdalen College. He was also visiting professor in the Department of Psychology, Oxford Brookes University. He was a Fellow of the British Psychological Society, Associate of the Royal College of Psychiatrists, and a past president of the International Society for the Study of Individual Differences.

Claridge died in Oxford on 3 May 2021, aged 89.

== Research ==
Claridge was best known for his work in developing the theoretical construct of schizotypy. Schizotypy as a concept overlaps, partially but not completely, with Eysenck’s concept of psychoticism. Research suggests that in some people milder forms of schizotypy may be adaptive and linked to creativity.

== Bibliography ==
- Personality and Arousal, 1967
- Drugs and Human Behaviour, 1970 (with S. Canter & W.E. Hume)
- Personality Differences and Biological Variations, 1973
- Origins of Mental Illness, 1985
- Sounds from the Bell Jar: Ten Psychotic Authors, 1990 (with R. Pryor & G. Watkins)
- Schizotypy: Implications for Illness and Health, 1997 (edited)
- Personality and Psychological Disorders, 2003 (with C. Davis)
- Psychopathology and personality dimensions: The Selected works of Gordon Claridge, 2018

=== Selected papers ===
- Cyhlarova E, Claridge G. (2005). Development of a version of the Schizotypy Traits Questionnaire (STA) for screening children. Schizophrenia Research, 80, 253-261.
- Rawlings, D., Barrentes-Vidal, N., Claridge, G., McCreery, C., and Galanos, G. (2000). A factor analytic study of the Hypomanic Personality Scale in British, Spanish and Australian samples. Personality and Individual Differences, 28, 73-84.
- Claridge, G., Clark, K., Davis, C., & Mason, O. (1998). Schizophrenia risk and handedness: a mixed picture. Laterality, 3, 209-220.
- Claridge, G., Clark, K., & Davis, C. (1997). Nightmares, dreams and schizotypy. British Journal of Clinical Psychology, 36, 377-386.
- Claridge, G., McCreery, C., Mason, O., Bentall, R., Boyle, G., Slade, P., & Popplewell, D. (1996). The factor structure of 'schizotypal' traits: A large replication study. British Journal of Clinical Psychology, 35, 103-115.
