= Unlocking Us =

Psychology and self-help podcast

- Genre: Psychology; Self-help
- Format: Interview; Monologue
- Language: Southern American English

Cast and voices
- Hosted by: Brené Brown

Production
- Length: Approx. 45–60 minutes

Publication
- Original release: January 9, 2020
- Provider: Parcast

Related
- Website: brenebrown.com/podcast-show/unlocking-us/

Unlocking Us is a psychology and self-help podcast hosted by Brené Brown. Produced by Parcast, the show consists of both monologue and interview content and focuses on human vulnerability through Brown's experiences in social work.

== Background ==
The podcast debuted on March 20, 2020. Brown discussed her fears concerning the launch of her podcast in the first episode of the show. Brown began the podcast to have a more intimate medium of communicating her stories with her audience and she records the show in her home. The show consists of both interview and monologue episodes. One of the first interviews done on the show featured David Kessler on his understanding of grief. In an episode released on March 27, 2020 Brown discusses the importance of positivity during the COVID-19 pandemic. Brown hosted another podcast called Dare to Lead based on her book of the same name.

== Reception ==
According to a spokesman cited by The New York Times, the show was averaging more than a million downloads every episode in May 2020.

Melissa Fyfe of The Sydney Morning Herald commented on the show saying that the "first season is a bit patchy" because it takes time to adjust to Brown's Southern American English and the disruptive advertisements, but Fyfe refers to the episodes with Harriet Lerner as a "masterclass in emotional intelligence." Alice Florence Orr also praised the Harriet Lerner episodes in the LA Review of Books channel Podcast Review, saying that the show "make[s] for unique listening." Hannah J. Davies of The Guardian commented on the show saying that it is "an anxiety-quelling Ted talk in audio form." Morgan McNaught of The A.V. Club praised the episode featuring Austin Channing Brown on her recently published book, I'm Still Here, calling the episode "richly informative."

=== Awards ===
Award	Date	Category	Result	Ref.
Webby Awards	2021	Interview or Talk Show	Nominated	
iHeartRadio Podcast Awards	2021	Best Advice or Inspirational Podcast	Won	

== See also ==
- List of psychology and self-help podcasts
