= LGBTQ culture in Austin, Texas =

Austin, Texas, has one of the most prominent and active LGBTQ populations in the United States. The city was acclaimed by The Advocate in 2012 as part of its Gayest Cities in America, and was recognized by Travel and Leisure as one of America's Best Cities for Gay Travel. Much of Austin's gay nightlife scene is clustered around 4th Street. LGBTQ activism groups Atticus Circle and Equality Texas are headquartered in Austin.

== History ==
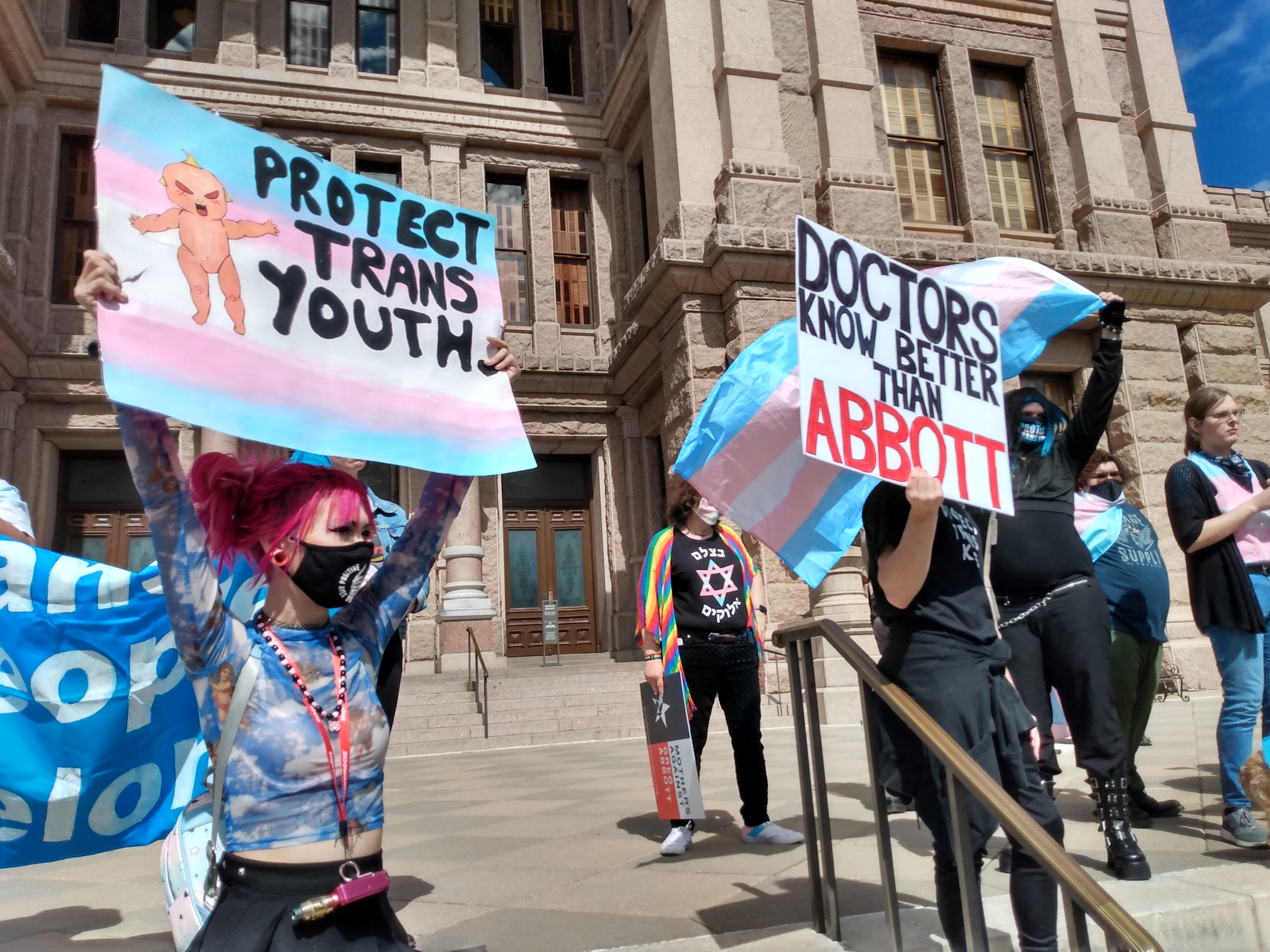
March for Trans Youth, 2022

Throughout the mid-20th century, Austin had several gay bars, long before its LGBTQ movement began. These included Apartment, Cabaret, Insomnia Club, Manhattan Club, Pearl Street Warehouse, and Red River Lounge.

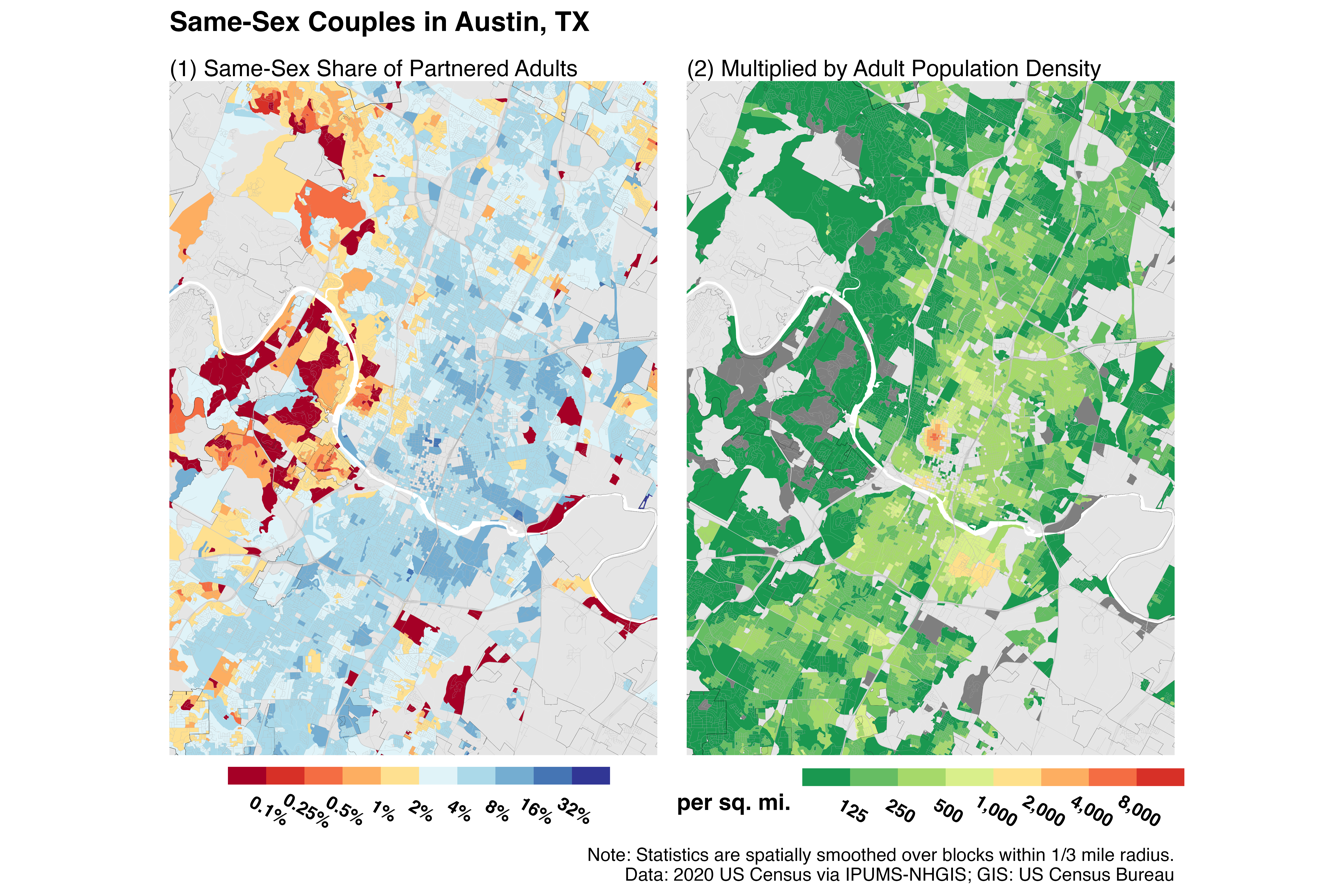
Map of same-sex couples in Austin

The LGBTQ movement in Austin began in 1970, shortly after the Stonewall riots that sparked LGBT movements across the U.S. This first public meeting was only attended by 25 individuals at University Y. In 1970, Austin also became home to a chapter of the Gay Liberation Front, and local newspapers such as The Rag began supporting the movement. By 1974, the Austin Lesbian Organization and the Gay People of Austin had been established. An event organized by the Gay People of Austin was held in 1974 at Shoal Creek Park and the Student Union Ballroom, which about 300 people attended. These early organizations were subjected to homophobic backlash; In 1975, an Austin Lesbian Organization party was raided by the University of Texas Silver Spurs, and pride floats built for Round Up Weekend were vandalized into the 1980s. In 1976, Mayor Jeff Friedman established a Gay Pride Week to take place annually in June, which included a pride and march to the Texas State Capitol. In response to the HIV/AIDS epidemic which began in Austin in 1983, the pride marches to the capitol building expanded in attendance to about 25,000 people.

By 1980, three more LGBTQ activism groups — Austin Lambda, Austin Lesbian/Gay Political Caucus, and Gay Community Services — had been established, and six more nightclubs — Austin Country, Friends and Lovers, Hollywood, New Apartment, and Private Cellar. In 1987, LGBTQ activist and Austin native Glen Maxey, was elected as execute director of the Lesbian/Gay Rights Lobby of Texas, and was elected to the Texas House of Representatives in 1991. The first Gay and Lesbian Pride Fiesta began in 1990.

On February 19, 2015, the first gay marriage in Texas occurred between an Austin couple, Sarah Goodfriend and Suzanne Bryant.

The Austin History Center has a diverse collection of materials regarding events, organizations, and people related to LGBTQ history in the local area.

== Organizations and community institutions ==
Soon after the HIV/AIDS epidemic hit Austin in the summer of 1983, Paul Clover founded the Waterloo Counseling Center in order to serve the LGBTQ community with queer-positive, affordable mental health services. The board of Waterloo later founded the Austin AIDs Project (AAP), which was incorporated as the AIDS Services of Austin (ASA). Both groups still exist today and continue to serve LGBTQ people and cisgender, heterosexual people alike.

OutYouth was founded in Austin, Texas in January 1990 by two graduate students from the University of Texas at Austin School of Social Work in order to provide resources for LGBTQ youths in the Austin area.

After a three-year transition period of being known as the Stonewall Chamber of Commerce, the Austin Gay and Lesbian Chamber of Commerce (AGLCC) was founded in 1997. It became one of the founding members of the National LGBT Chamber of Commerce (NGLCC) in 2004, and had representation on the Council of Chambers and Business Organizations from 2008 to 2009 and 2013–present. The AGLCC changed their name in 2017 to the Austin LGBT Chamber of Commerce in order to include the contributions of bisexual and transgender communities to the overall LGBTQ+ community.

The Austin Gay and Lesbian Pride Foundation was founded in 2010 as a 100 percent volunteer-run non-profit meant to manage and organize Austin's annual PRIDE celebration and Stonewall Rally.

== Recreation ==
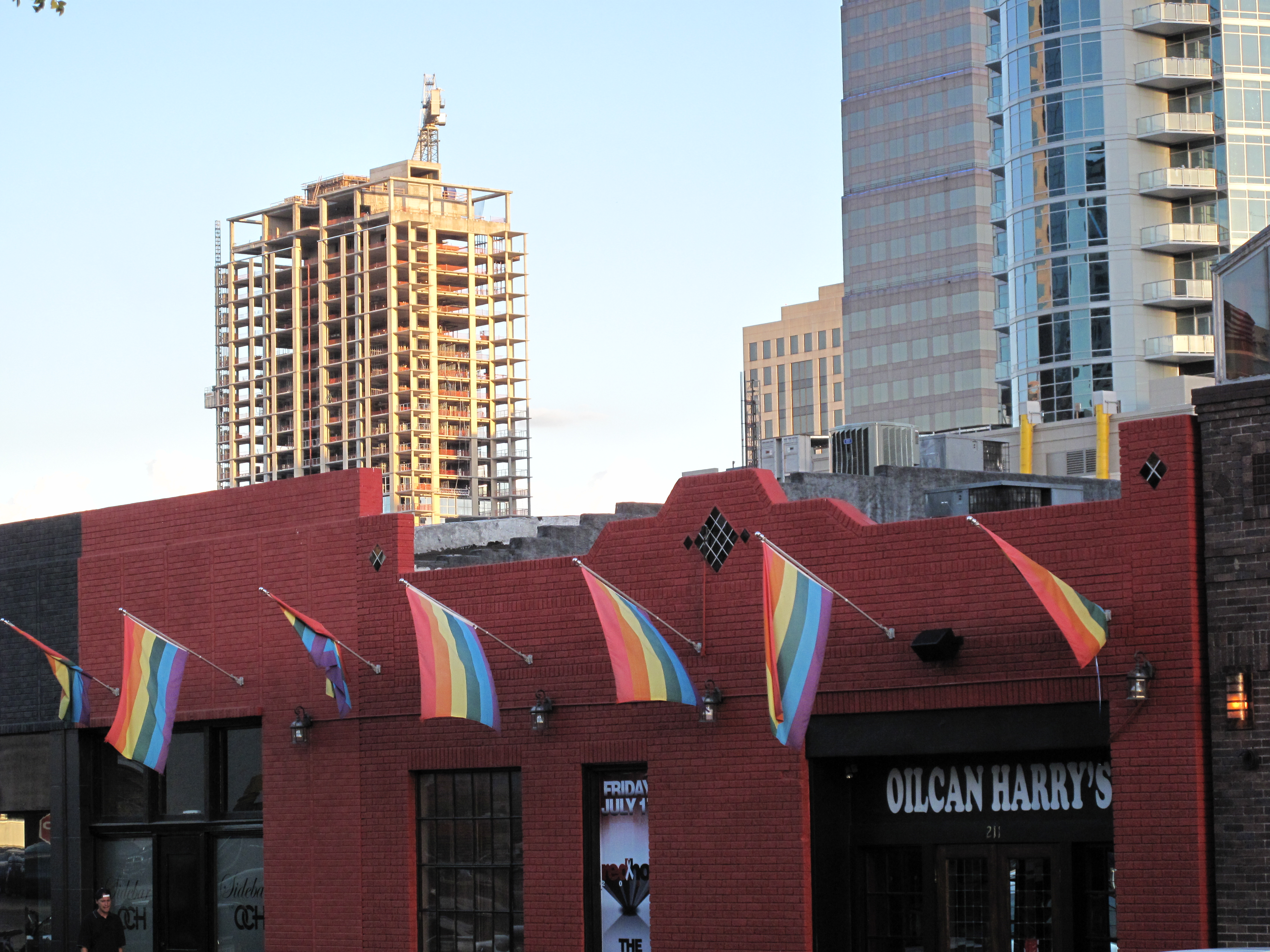
Pride flags at the gay bar Oilcan Harry's

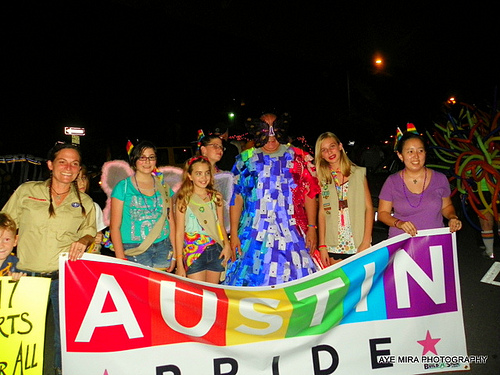
Austin Pride, 2012

Most of Austin's gay bars and nightclubs are clustered around 4th Street, or the Warehouse District. There are few establishments, but most are well-attended, and all are small in size. These bars include Oilcan Harry's, Highland Lounge, Rain on 4th, The Iron Bear, and Cheer Up Charlie's, which has repeatedly won "Best LGBTQ Nightclub" in Austin.

Austin also has a gay sunbathing area located at Hippie Hollow Park.

The annual Austin Pride Parade and Festival is organized by the Austin Gay and Lesbian Pride Foundation. It is typically held in August.

Queerbomb is a free, all-ages, anti-corporate sponsorship event that is held annually in June. The event begins with a rally featuring entertainment and speeches. The rally is followed by a procession through downtown Austin. Afterwards, there is a celebration at the rally site. Queerbomb was created as an alternative to the Pride Festival which charges for admission and for organizations to have outreach tables, and enforces a dress-code.

There are a plethora of LGBTQ recreational sports leagues in Austin, including a basketball league, cycling group, kickball league, and many others. Austinites can learn more about these leagues in person at an annual gAyTX sports fair. There is also a chapter of the Texas Gay Rodeo Association in Austin.

There is an annual Austin Black Pride event celebrating black gay culture and community.

== Notable people ==
- Leslie Cochran, a crossdresser and activist who ran unsuccessfully for mayor
- Tom Ford, a gay fashion designer, film director, screenwriter, and film producer who was born in Austin
- Glen Maxey, the first openly gay member of the Texas Legislature
- Tommy Tune, a gay actor, dancer, singer, theatre director, producer, and choreographer who attended the University of Texas at Austin
