= Brené Brown =

American academic, speaker and author

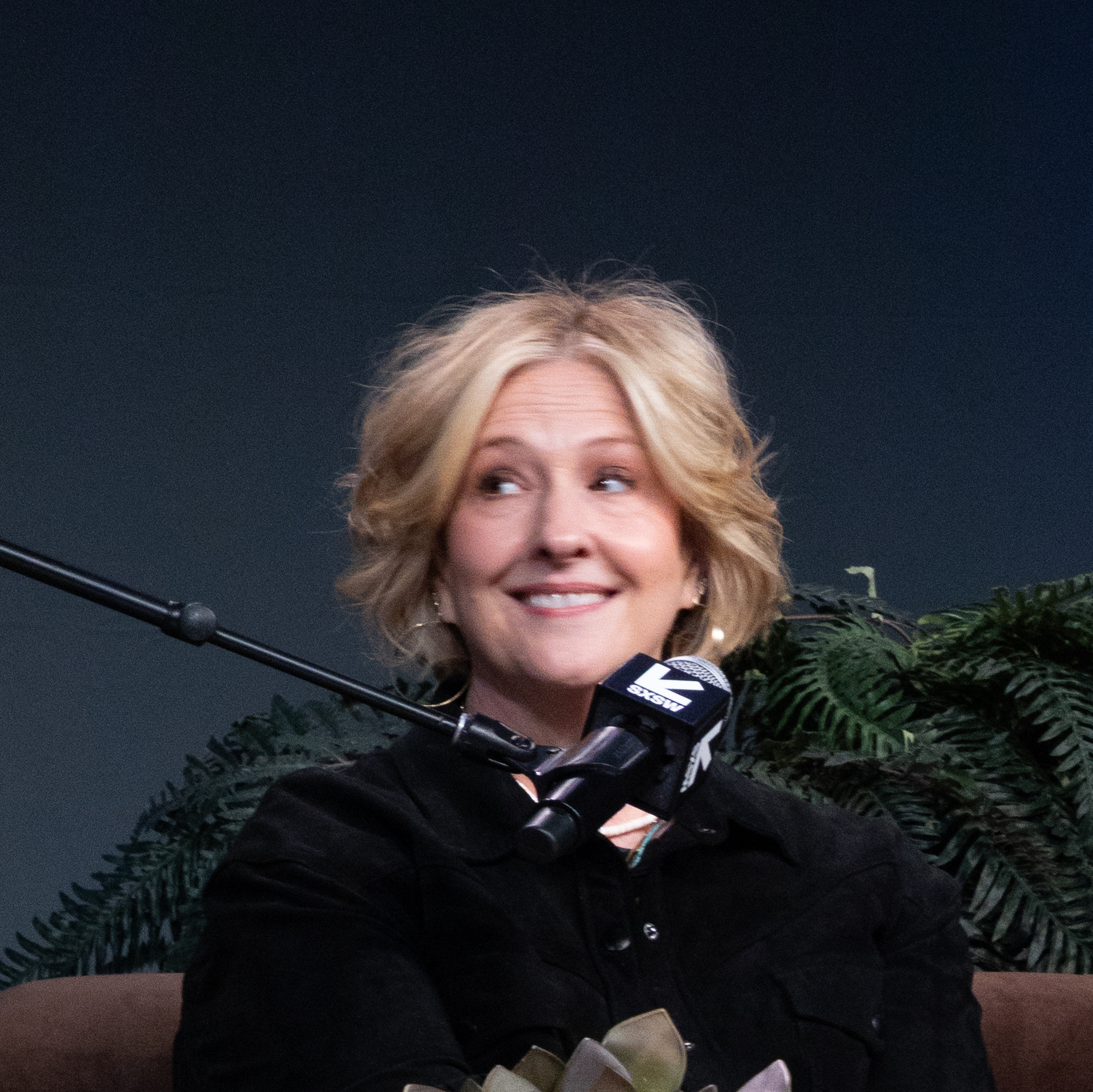
- Brown at the 2025 South by Southwest festival
- Born: Casandra Brené Brown; November 18, 1965 (age 60); San Antonio, Texas, U.S.

Academic background
- Education: University of Texas, Austin (BA, MSW); University of Houston (PhD)
- Thesis: Acompañar: A Grounded Theory of Developing, Maintaining and Assessing Relevance in Professional Helping (2002)

Academic work
- Discipline: Social work
- Institutions: University of Houston
- Notable works: Daring Greatly (2012); Atlas of the Heart (2021)
- Website: Official website

Casandra Brené Brown (born November 18, 1965) is an American academic, author and podcaster.

Brown is known for her work on shame, vulnerability, and leadership, and for her widely viewed 2010 TEDx talk. She has written six number-one New York Times bestselling books, including The Gifts of Imperfection, Daring Greatly, Rising Strong, Braving the Wilderness, Dare to Lead, and Atlas of the Heart and hosted two podcasts on Spotify.

She appears in the 2019 documentary Brené Brown: The Call to Courage on Netflix. In 2022, HBO Max released a documentary series based on her book Atlas of the Heart.

Brown is the Huffington Foundation's Brené Brown Endowed Chair at the University of Houston's Graduate College of Social Work and a visiting professor in management at the McCombs School of Business in the University of Texas at Austin.

== Early life and education ==
Brown is the eldest of four children. Her family lives in New Orleans, Louisiana.

Brown completed a Bachelor of Social Work degree at the University of Texas at Austin in 1995, a Master of Social Work degree in 1996, and a Doctor of Philosophy degree in social work at the University of Houston Graduate School of Social Work in 2002.

== Career ==
=== Research and teaching ===
Brown has studied the topics of courage, vulnerability, shame, empathy, and leadership, which she has used to look at human connection and how it works. She has spent her research career as a professor at the University of Houston's Graduate College of Social Work.

=== Public speaking ===
Brown's TEDx talk from Houston in 2010, "The Power of Vulnerability", is one of the five most viewed TED talks. Its popularity shifted her work from relative obscurity in academia into the mainstream spotlight. The talk "summarizes a decade of Brown's research on shame, framing her weightiest discoveries in self-deprecating and personal terms." Reggie Ugwu for The New York Times said that this event gave the world "a new star of social psychology." She went on to follow this popular TED talk with another titled "Listening to Shame" in 2012. In the second talk she talks about how her life has changed since the first talk and explains the connection between shame and vulnerability, building on the thesis of her first TED talk.

She also has a less well-known talk from 2010, given at TEDxKC titled "The Price of Invulnerability." In it she explains that when numbing hard and difficult feelings, essentially feeling vulnerable, we also numb positive emotions, like joy. This led to the creation of her filmed lecture, Brené Brown: The Call to Courage, which debuted on Netflix in 2019. USA Today called it "a mix of a motivational speech and stand-up comedy special." Brown discusses how and why to choose courage over comfort, equating being brave to being vulnerable. According to her research, doing this opens people to love, joy, and belonging by allowing them to better know themselves and more deeply connect with other people.

Brown regularly works as a public speaker at private events and businesses, such as at Alain de Botton's School of Life and at Google and Disney.

=== Writing ===
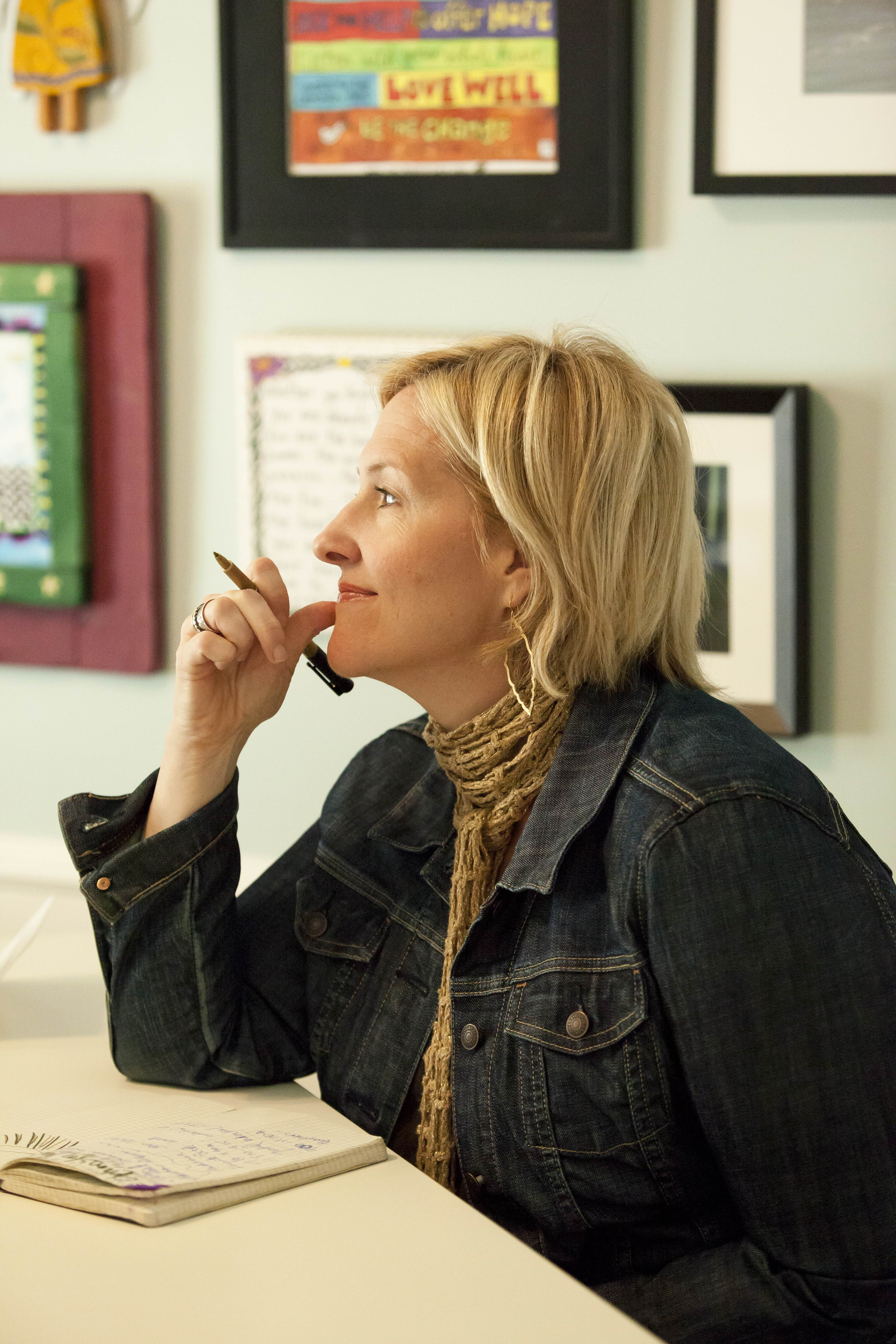
Brené Brown, 2012

She is, as of 2021, the author of six number-one New York Times bestsellers: The Gifts of Imperfection, Daring Greatly, Rising Strong, Braving the Wilderness, Dare to Lead, and Atlas of the Heart. She discussed Daring Greatly with Oprah Winfrey on Super Soul Sunday in March 2013. The book's title comes from a 1910 Theodore Roosevelt speech, "Citizenship in a Republic", given at the Sorbonne. Her most recent work, Atlas of the Heart, was published in November 2021, with the goal of helping readers expand their emotional vocabulary—the language they have to communicate their feelings.

Brown wrote a chapter of advice in Tim Ferriss' book Tools of Titans. With Tarana Burke, she co-created You Are Your Best Thing: Vulnerability, Shame Resilience, and the Black Experience, an anthology of essays by Black individuals discussing the trauma of white supremacy as well as the experiences of Black love and Black life.

=== Podcasting ===
In 2020, Brown began hosting the Unlocking Us and Dare to Lead podcasts. Unlocking Us alternates between interviews with guests and solo episodes where Brown talks alone, directly to listeners. In solo episodes, she tells stories from her life, explains learnings from her research, and supplements it with summaries of other related social science work. Interview guests have included grief expert David Kessler, singer Alicia Keys, writer Glennon Doyle, and activist Tarana Burke who started the Me Too movement.

In 2022, Brown's interview with Debbie Millman was featured on the Storybound season 5 premiere.

=== Other work ===
Brown is CEO of "The Daring Way", a professional training and certification program on the topics of vulnerability, courage, shame, and empathy. She appeared as herself in the movie Wine Country. Her five-part docuseries, Brené Brown: Atlas of the Heart, was released on HBO Max in 2022.

== Personal life ==
Brown is married and has two children. The family lives in Houston, Texas. She supports Liverpool F.C., the San Antonio Spurs and the Houston Astros.

Though she was baptized in the Episcopal Church, her family raised her as a Catholic. She later left the Catholic Church and returned to the Episcopal community with her husband and children two decades later.

Brown revealed past addictions to alcohol, smoking, emotional eating and control; she often speaks about the positive impact of her decision to stop drinking and smoking on May 12, 1996, one day after her master's program graduation.

== Honors and awards ==
In 2009 Houston Woman Magazine voted Brown one of the city's most influential women. She has also received teaching awards, including the Graduate College of Social Work's Outstanding Faculty Award. In 2016, the Huffington Foundation pledged $2 million over four years to endow a research chair in her name at the Graduate College of Social Work, where she guides the training of social work students in grounded theory methodology and in her research into vulnerability, courage, shame, and empathy. The National Association of Social Workers Foundation awarded her the International Rhoda G. Sarnat Award in 2016, for her work in enhancing public image of the social work profession. In 2021, her podcast Unlocking Us won the iHeartRadio Podcast Award for Best Advice or Inspirational Podcast. In 2022, her book Atlas of the Heart won the Goodreads Choice award for Best Nonfiction.

== Selected works ==
- Women & Shame: Reaching Out, Speaking Truths And Building Connection, 3C Press, ISBN 9780975425237 (2005)
- "Feminist Standpoint Theory" and "Shame Resilience Theory." In S. P. Robbins, P. Chatterjee & E. R. Canda (Eds.), Contemporary human behavior theory: A Critical Perspective for Social Work. Boston: Allyn and Bacon. 560 pp. ISBN 978-0-13-477926-3 Published 2007.
- I Thought It Was Just Me (But It Isn't): Telling the Truth About Perfectionism, Inadequacy and Power. Avery. 336 pp. ISBN 978-1-59240-335-6 (2007)
- Connections: A 12-Session Psychoeducational Shame-Resilience Curriculum. Center City, MN: Hazelden. ISBN 978-1-59285-742-5 (2009)
- The Gifts of Imperfection: Let Go of Who You Think You're Supposed to Be and Embrace Who You Are. Center City, MN: Hazelden. 160 pp. ISBN 978-1-59285-849-1 (2010)
- Men, Women and Worthiness: The Experience of Shame and the Power of Being Enough, Sounds true INC International Concepts, ISBN 978-1-604078510, (2012)
- Daring Greatly: How the Courage to Be Vulnerable Transforms the Way We Live, Love, Parent and Lead. New York City: Gotham. 320 pp. ISBN 978-1-59240-841-2 (2012)
- The Gifts of Imperfect Parenting: Raising Children with Courage, Compassion, and Connection, Sounds true INC International Concepts, ISBN 9781604079739 (2013)
- Rising Strong: The Reckoning, the Rumble, the Revolution. Spiegel & Grau, now Random House. 352 pp. ISBN 978-0-8129-8580-1 (2015)
- Rising Strong as a Spiritual Practice, Sounds true INC International Concepts, ISBN 9781622037810, (2017)
- Braving the Wilderness: The Quest for True Belonging and the Courage to Stand Alone. Random House. 208 pp. ISBN 978-0-8129-8581-8 (2017)
- Dare to Lead: Brave Work. Tough Conversations. Whole Hearts. Random House. 320 pp. ISBN 978-0-399-59252-2 (2018)
- The Gifts of Imperfection (10th Anniversary Edition). 256 pp. ISBN 0-593-13358-7 (2020)
- Atlas of the Heart. Random House. 336 pp. ISBN 978-0-399-59255-3 (2021)
- Strong Ground: The Lessons of Daring Leadership, the Tenacity of Paradox, and the Wisdom of the Human Spirit. Random House. 448 pp. ISBN 978-1984855749 (2025)
