= Hidden Brain =

Science podcast by Shankar Vedantam

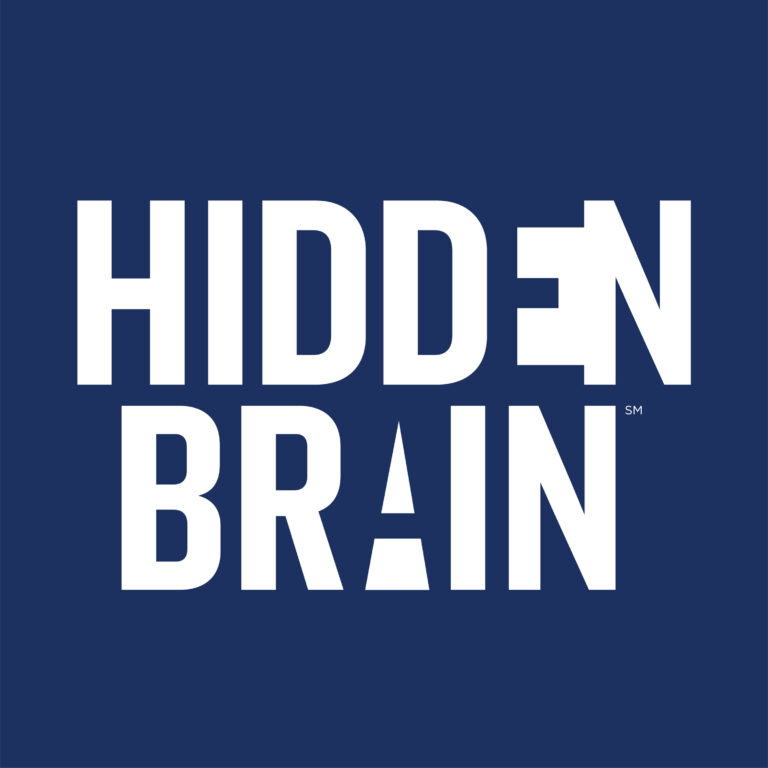
- Genre: Psychology; Neuroscience; Science
- Language: English

Cast and voices
- Hosted by: Shankar Vedantam

Production
- Length: 30-60 Minutes

Publication
- Original release: August 9, 2015
- Provider: Midroll Media
- Updates: Weekly

Related
- Related shows: The Life Scientific; Throughline; You're Wrong About; Invisibilia
- Website: hiddenbrain.org

Hidden Brain is a science podcast hosted by Shankar Vedantam.

== Background ==
The show originally began as a segment of NPR's Morning Edition. The first episode of the podcast focused on a concept called "switchtracking". Vedantam founded the independent company Hidden Brain Media in 2019 and left NPR in 2020. Hidden Brain joined the Midroll Media network in 2020, with NPR continuing to distribute the radio show.

== Reception ==
The podcast was included on Mashable's list of "The 21 best science podcasts if you're keen to learn how things work" as well as their list of "Best podcasts for achieving your 2021 New Year's resolutions".

Esther Perel told The New York Times that "The host, Shankar Vedantam, seamlessly transforms dry and academic research into compelling stories that offer a total and complete escape. I can’t stop listening."

The podcast won a Webby Award in 2017.

== Adaptations ==
In 2021, the podcast was adapted into a book.

== See also ==
- List of psychology and self-help podcasts
