= Dannagal Young =

American scholar

Dannagal Goldthwaite Young is an American scholar. She is a professor of communication and political science at the University of Delaware and Director of the university's Center for Political Communication.

== Career ==
She earned her Ph.D. from University of Pennsylvania in 2007. She studied the effects of political satire on viewers' attitudes and behaviors and developed the "counterargument disruption model of political humor" to explain how humor reduces audience resistance to persuasive messages. Her 2020 book, Irony and Outrage: The Polarized Landscape of Rage, Fear, and Laughter in the United States argues that liberals and conservatives prefer to create and consume different political aesthetics (e.g.; liberal ironic satire versus conservative outrage programming) due to underlying differences in the psychological traits of liberals and conservatives. Her 2023 book, Wrong: How Media, Politics, and Identity Drive our Appetite for Misinformation argues that social identity creates people's demand for identity-reinforcing misinformation. Wrong suggests that in the U.S., political mega-identities were cultivated by America's racial history (in particular following the Southern Strategy, Great Migration (African American) and party realignment of the late 1960s (see Sixth Party System), and later rewarded and reinforced by the profit motives of America's fragmented political media system.

She is an improv comedian with ComedySportz Philadelphia and in 2018 produced a comedy talk show, Dr. Young Unpacks. She spoke at the Harvard Kennedy School. and at the American Board of Internal Medicine Foundation Forum and delivered a TED Talk in 2020.

Her work has appeared in Vox. Her interest in conspiracy theories grew from her husband becoming ill, as she explained in the Australian Broadcasting Commission radio program Conversations in June 2020, and on a 2024 episode of Hidden Brain with Shankar Vedantam.

== Publications ==
=== As author ===
- Young, Dannagal Goldthwaite (2020). Irony and Outrage. New York, NY, United States of America: Oxford University Press, USA. ISBN 978-0-19-091308-3..
- Young, Dannagal Goldthwaite (October 17, 2023). Wrong: How Media, Politics, and Identity Drive Our Appetite for Misinformation. Baltimore: JHU Press. ISBN 978-1-4214-4775-9.

=== As editor ===
- Young, Dannagal G.; Gray, Jonathan, eds. (2013), Breaking Boundaries: In Political Entertainment Studies, USC Annenberg Press, ISBN 978-1-62517-175-7
- Boatright, Robert G.; Shaffer, Timothy J.; Sobieraj, Sarah; Young, Dannagal Goldthwaite, eds. (2019). A Crisis of Civility?: Political Discourse and Its Discontents. New York, NY: Routledge. ISBN 978-1-351-05196-5.
