= Brigitte Bandit =

American drag queen

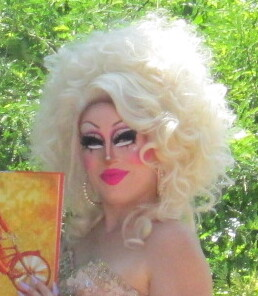
- Brigitte Bandit in 2023
- Website: https://www.brigittebandit.com

Brigitte Bandit is an American drag queen and activist based in Austin, Texas.

== Early life ==
Bandit grew up in northwest Austin. She was also interested in music from a young age, with the first two artists she saw in concert being Cher and Dolly Parton; she later played flute in her school's marching band. Bandit's mother was also an influence on Bandit's love of performance; she worked as a stripper, and later fought to be included in a Cher impersonation contest, in which she won second place.

At age 15, Bandit began working with children, first as an art instructor, and later as a swim instructor.

== Drag career ==
Bandit, a flamboyant dresser, had long been interested in drag, but thought, as a person assigned female at birth, they would not be allowed to perform. After watching a performance by Sin Wai Kin, she realized she had been wrong, and began pursuing drag. They began performing in drag in the late 2010s, at age 26.

Bandit has performed as Dolly Parton multiple times, and has been called the "Dolly of Austin". She has also addressed political and social issues in her shows, such as underfunded schools, poverty, policing, and laws related to abortion access and drag performance. They have performed in shows at Oilcan Harry's and at the Austin City Limits Music Festival. During the COVID-19 pandemic, Bandit participated in Extragrams, a drag queen telegram service.

She has also been involved with drag storytime events, during which she has dressed as Dolly Parton, as well as characters like Ariel (The Little Mermaid) and Jessie (Toy Story 2). In 2023, one of Bandit's TikTok videos, in which they lip-sync to Katy Perry's "Firework" alongside several children, received nearly 4 million views before it was removed by TikTok for "child safety purposes".

== Activism ==
Bandit has spoken against anti-drag bills in Texas since 2022, including Senate Bill 12 and Senate Bill 1601.

Their first testimony against Senate Bill 12 went viral, both for her full drag look (the photo of which was named one of Time's Top 100 Photos of 2023) and because she pointed out the "absurdity" of the bill because, as someone who was assigned female at birth and who performs a feminine character, Bandit would not be bound by the proposed laws. During their second testimony against the bill, later in 2023, Bandit again appeared in drag, in a dress which featured the Texas flag and the names of the children killed in the 2022 Uvalde shooting and the 2023 Allen, Texas shooting, with the slogan "Defend our kids against gun violence. Restrict guns, not drag" on her back. After the bill was passed, Bandit was one of five plaintiffs in the ACLU's lawsuit against it.

Bandit has received online harassment for her visible opposition to the bills, including death threats and doxing.

In December 2023, Dolly Parton gifted Bandit a custom guitar in honor of their activism.

In June 2024, Bandit spoke at the 2024 Texas Democratic Convention. Clips of her speech, which focused on youth access to gender-affirming healthcare, were shared by Libs of TikTok, drawing online ire from many right-wing commentators, who claimed they were a man "promoting sex-change surgery for minors," although she did not mention surgery in her speech. Later that month, they traveled to Washington, D.C. to lobby for the Equality Act, a proposed law which would include gender identity and sexual orientation in federal nondiscrimination policies.

Beginning in January 2025, Bandit hosted LegiSLAYtion & Liberation, a weekly event in Austin focused on summarizing weekly political news in an educational and comedic style.

== Personal life ==
Bandit is nonbinary and uses both she/her and they/them pronouns.
