= Lena Guerrero =

American politician (1957–2008)

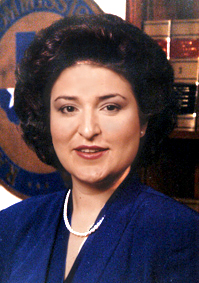

Railroad Commissioner of Texas
- In office January 23, 1991 – October 1, 1992
- Governor: Ann Richards
- Preceded by: John Sharp
- Succeeded by: Jim Wallace

Member of the Texas House of Representatives from the 51st district
- In office January 8, 1985 – January 4, 1991
- Preceded by: Gonzalo Barrientos
- Succeeded by: Glen Maxey

Personal details
- Born: November 27, 1957 Mission, Texas, U.S.
- Died: April 24, 2008 (aged 50) Austin, Texas, U.S.
- Resting place: Texas State Cemetery in Austin, Texas
- Party: Democratic
- Spouse: Lionel "Leo" Aguirre (m. 1983)
- Children: 1
- Occupation: Lobbyist

Lena Guerrero Aguirre (November 27, 1957 – April 24, 2008) was a Texan political figure who served in the Texas House of Representatives. She was later appointed as the first woman and first non-white member of the Texas Railroad Commission, which regulates the oil and natural gas industry. Her political career ended in 1992 over a falsified résumé scandal.

In the 1960s, Guerrero and her siblings were migrant workers. She attended the University of Texas at Austin, where she was president of the Young Democrats of Texas. She was elected to the Texas House, and appointed to a vacant seat on the Texas Railroad Commission, but when she ran for reelection to the seat it was discovered that she had falsely claimed to have graduated from UT.

She died of brain cancer at the age of fifty.

Texas House of Representatives
Preceded by Gonzalo Barrientos	Member of the Texas House of Representatives from District 51 (Austin); 1985–1991	Succeeded by Glen Maxey
Government offices
Preceded by John Sharp	Texas Railroad Commissioner; 1991–1992	Succeeded by Jim Wallace (temporary); Barry Williamson (full-term)
