= Eddie Rodriguez (politician) =

Texas state legislator (born 1971)

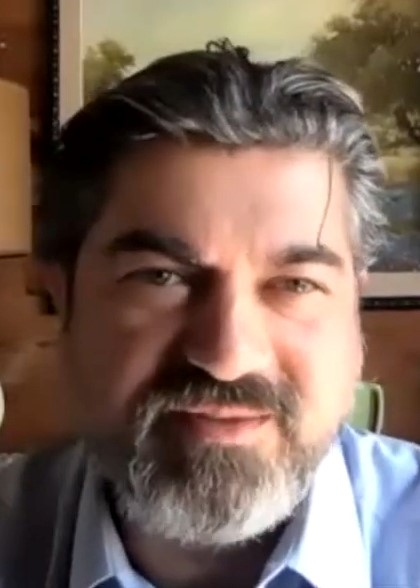
- Rodriguez in 2021

Member of the Texas House of Representatives from the 51st district
- In office January 14, 2003 – January 10, 2023
- Preceded by: Glen Maxey
- Succeeded by: Lulu Flores

Personal details
- Born: Eduardo Rene Rodriguez; July 1, 1971 (age 55) McAllen, Texas, U.S.
- Party: Democratic
- Education: University of Texas at Austin (BA, JD)

Eduardo Rene Rodriguez (born July 1, 1971) is an American politician who served as a member of the Texas House of Representatives for the 51st district. Elected in November 2002, he assumed office in January 2003 and left office in 2023.

== Early life and education ==
Rodriguez was born and raised in Rio Grande Valley, where he graduated from McAllen Memorial High School. He studied government at the University of Texas at Austin and earned his Juris Doctor in 2008 from the University of Texas School of Law.

== Career ==
Before serving in the legislature, Rodriguez was an aide to state representative Glen Maxey.

On February 18, 2020, State Senator Kirk Watson of the 14th Senate district announced his intention to resign. On March 7, 2020, Rodriguez became the first candidate to launch a campaign for the seat. On June 4, 2020, Rodriguez reported to the Texas Ethics Commission that his campaign raised $410,003.64, including donations from Valero PAC ($1,000), Chevron Employees PAC ($1,500), Marathon Oil Company Employees PAC ($2,000), NRG Energy PAC ($2,000), and ONCOR Texas State PAC ($3,500). He faced five other candidates in the special election scheduled for July 14, 2020, and finished in a distant second, behind fellow Democrat Sarah Eckhardt.

On November 4, 2021, Rodriguez filed with the Federal Election Commission to declare his candidacy for Texas's 35th congressional district. Rodriguez received criticism after publishing a mailer addressing opponent Greg Casar's efforts to reduce homelessness in Austin. Rodriguez finished second after Casar in the March 1, 2022 Democratic primary for the seat, receiving 15.6% of the vote to Casar’s 61.3%.
