= List of psychology and self-help podcasts =

The following is a list of psychology and self-help podcasts that focus on popular psychology, meditation, and mindfulness.

== List ==
Podcast	Year	Starring, Narrator(s), or Host(s)	Produced by	Ref
The Psychology Podcast	2014-present	Scott Barry Kaufman	iHeart Radio	
The Happiness Lab	2019–present	Laurie Santos	Pushkin Industries	
Where Should We Begin?	2017–present	Esther Perel	Gimlet Media	
Unlocking Us	2020–2021	Brené Brown	Parcast Network	
Hidden Brain	2015–present	Shankar Vedantam	Midroll Media	
The Calmer You Podcast	2017–present	Chloe Brotheridge	Independent	
Audio Dharma	2021–present	Gil Fronsdal	Insight Meditation Center	
The Mindful Minute Podcast	2019–present	Meryl Arnett	Independent	
Sleep Whispers	2017–present		Independent	
Meditation for Health	2009–present	Robert Puff	Independent	
Healthy-ish	2017–present	Felicity Harley	Body + Soul	
Meditation for Every Day	2020–2021	Paulina Thurm	Inhale Life	
Sleep with Me	2018–present	Drew Ackerman	Dearest Scooter	
Slow Radio	2017–present	David Clarke	Independent	
The Calm Collective				
The Anxiety Coaches Podcast	2021–present	Gina Ryan	Independent	
The Mindful Kind	2015–present	Rachael Kable	Independent	
Soul Music			BBC Radio 4	
On Being	2001–present	Krista Tippett	Public Radio Exchange	
Happy Place	2018–present	Fearne Cotton	Public Radio Exchange	
Mindfulness For Beginners	2020–present	Shaun Donaghy	Independent	
Mindfulness For Gamers	2023–present	Shaun Donaghy	Pickaxe	

== See also ==
- Self-help
- Meditation
