= Brené Brown: The Call to Courage =

2019 documentary film

- Directed by: Sandra Restrepo
- Starring: Brené Brown
- Distributed by: Netflix
- Release date: April 19, 2019
- Running time: 76 minutes
- Country: United States
- Language: English

Brené Brown: The Call To Courage is a 2019 documentary film directed by Sandra Restrepo. The documentary depicts Brené Brown as she discusses what it takes to choose courage over comfort in today's culture.

The film was released by Netflix on April 19, 2019.

== Premise ==
Brené Brown: The Call to Courage is about how bravery can arise from engaging with our deepest vulnerabilities. Brené Brown has published TED Talks and books earlier about the subject, and this documentary continues exploring the topic.

== Synopsis ==
Brown begins by linking courage and vulnerability and explaining that one needs to be vulnerable to be brave. She shows the audience some cover design ideas for her book Daring Greatly to show how shame and vulnerability are interpreted across cultures.

Brown shares how her Ted Talk on vulnerability actually happened by accident. Brown was invited to open TedX Houston on any topic of her choice. Prior to the show, Brown had been at a conference in Maui talking about vulnerability, which led to her wanting to be vulnerable on stage during the Ted Talk the next day. After the Ted Talk, Brown felt embarrassed about the talk and was afraid of criticism. She shares with the audience some of the criticism and how she handled it. After the Ted Talk, Brown was watching Downton Abbey to distract her mind from critics and realized that Teddy Roosevelt was the US president at the time. She came across one of his speeches in which he discusses daring greatly. This phrase changed her life. She decided that in her life, she was going to take chances and choose courage over comfort. The quote also taught her that vulnerability is showing up when one does not know the outcome. Finally, she learned that she was not open to hateful feedback on her work from people who were not practicing vulnerability in their lives.

Brown also shares a story from a few years ago that while she and her husband were on a long family vacation visiting Lake Travis in Austin, Texas. She and her husband decided that to stay healthy, they would swim at the lake every day. While at the lake swimming one day, she told her husband that she felt very connected with him, and he did not respond with the same level of passion about their connection in the moment. She told him how she felt about this special moment again, and he gave the same type of response, which made her angry. When they got back to the dock, Brown thought about what story she was making up in her head about the situation and shared with her husband how rejected she felt. In doing so, he shared with her that while they were swimming, he was fending off a panic attack about a dream he had the night prior about not being able to save his kids when they were drowning. Brown realized they were both in a shame lockdown, with her feeling insecure about her body and him feeling weak. She reassured him that she heard his vulnerability, and he later reassured her about hers. That incident changed Brown's marriage for her.

Brown tells the audience that while vulnerability is at the heart of negative emotions like shame, fear, and anxiety, it is also the birthplace of emotions like love, belonging, and joy. She explains that research has shown that people who are able to be vulnerable enough to lean into joy share one quality: gratitude. In her research, Brown has learned three lessons about gratitude. Firstly, gratitude is healing because it shows others that we value what we have. Secondly, gratitude helps us find joy in the small, ordinary things. Finally, sometimes we need to choose joy even when we do not necessarily feel like doing so. Brown also explains how vulnerability affects leadership and the workplace. If one is not willing to be vulnerable, that stifles innovation and creativity. Having difficult conversations around issues such as race and gender in the workplace also requires vulnerability and acknowledging that we will make mistakes and be uncomfortable.

Brown covers some myths of vulnerability, including the faulty thinking that it is a weakness or that it does not work for everybody. She also explains how vulnerability involves more than mere disclosure of information. Brown shares a final story of her daughter joining the swim team in middle school. One day, Brown went to pick her daughter up after practice and noticed that she was crying. Her daughter was nervous about competing in the upcoming swim tournament doing the 100-yard breaststroke, a difficult move. Her daughter considered not showing up when her name was called and was convinced that she would not win. However, on the day of the race, her daughter showed up and competed even though she was lapped by every other competitor and was the last swimmer remaining in the pool. After the race, her daughter came up to Brown and said that even though the experience was terrible, she felt as if she had won because she had chosen to be brave.
