= Daring Greatly =

2012 book by Brené Brown

- Author: Brené Brown
- Original title: Daring Greatly: How the Courage to Be Vulnerable Transforms the Way We Live, Love, Parent and Lead.
- Publisher: Gotham Books
- Publication date: 2012
- ISBN: 978-1592408412
- Website: Official website

Daring Greatly is a 2012 self-help book written by Brené Brown. It is a New York Times bestseller and covers topics of vulnerability and shame.

== Overview ==
The title of the book is taken from the 1910 speech Citizenship in a Republic by Theodore Roosevelt, in which he stated, "who at the best knows in the end the triumph of high achievement, and who at the worst, if he fails, at least fails while daring greatly." In the book, Brown equates vulnerability with being something hard to do and that we need to "dare greatly" in order to overcome that vulnerability. The book describes feelings of shame and unworthiness and how people have a hard time admitting they are doing certain things. It also talks about owning and engaging in vulnerability and shame resilience.

At the end of the introduction of the chapter, Brown writes that the book will explore these questions:

- "What drives our fear of being vulnerable?"
- "How are we protecting ourselves from vulnerability?"
- "What price are we paying when we shut down and disengage?"
- "How do we own and engage with vulnerability so we can start transforming the way we live, love, lead, and parent?"

== Reception ==
A review from Kirkus praised the book, describing it as "[a] straightforward approach to revamping one's life from an expert on vulnerability". A Publishers Weekly review also stated that the book's main message is "understanding the difference between guilt and shame". The book was also commercially well-received, and was a New York Times bestseller.
