= AIDS Services of Austin =

Non-profit service organization

- Founded: 1987
- Type: 501(c)(3)
- Purpose: HIV/AIDS
- Location: Austin, Texas
- Region served: Central Texas
- Key people: Paul Scott, CEO
- Website: www.asaustin.org

AIDS Services of Austin (ASA) is a non-profit AIDS service organization that addresses HIV and AIDS in Central Texas. Founded in 1987, ASA is the region's oldest and largest community-based organization addressing the local AIDS crisis. Annually, they provide direct care services to over 1,500 people and HIV prevention education to over 10,000 people.

In 2020, ASA merged with national HIV/AIDS non-profit Vivent Health. All ASA services now operate under the Vivent Health name.

== History ==
=== 1980s ===
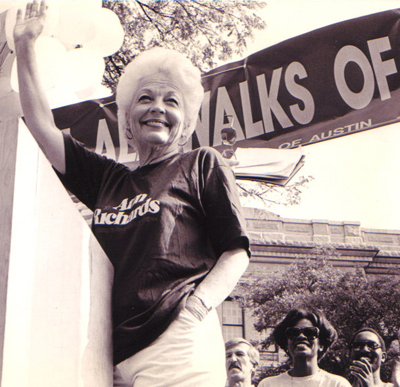
Ann Richards speaks at the first AIDS Walk Austin in 1988.

The first HIV case in Austin was reported in the summer of 1983, known at the time as GRID, or Gay-Related Immune Deficiency. In the first months of the outbreak, there was no local organization dedicated to the quickly growing crisis. In August 1983, Paul Clover founded the Waterloo Counseling Center to serve the gay community through queer-positive, affordable mental health services.

==== Volunteer beginnings ====
A volunteer organization, the Octopus Club, was organized by Lew Aldridge in 1987.

== Early politics of AIDS ==
In the fall of 1986, the Texas Commissioner of Health proposed quarantining gay men suspected of having HIV and AIDS. Glen Maxey from the Austin AIDS Project organized medical experts to testify before the Texas Legislature against quarantine. On the day the quarantine proposal was withdrawn, Maxey stepped onto the steps of the Texas Department of Health to a throng of cameras. Interviewed by Dan Rather for the CBS Evening News, Maxey was outed as a gay activist.

== Annual Events ==
=== AIDS Walk Austin ===
AIDS Walk Austin began as From All Walks of Life in 1988 and is ASA's oldest continuous fundraiser. The AIDS Walk is a 5k walk through downtown Austin and includes speeches, music and remembrance. In recent years, it has also featured panels from the AIDS Memorial Quilt.

=== Viva ===
Viva, also known as Viva Las Vegas, is an ASA fundraiser that traditionally features faux gambling. In 2009, the event began featuring a fashion show, labeled by Austin American-Statesman social columnist Michael Barnes as the "Best Austin fashion show ever."
