= Elisabeth Kübler-Ross =

Swiss-American psychiatrist (1926–2004)

- Born: Elisabeth Kübler; July 8, 1926; Zurich, Switzerland
- Died: August 24, 2004 (aged 78); Scottsdale, Arizona, U.S.
- Citizenship: Switzerland; United States
- Education: University of Zurich (MD)
- Known for: Kübler-Ross model
- Spouse: Emanuel Ross (m. 1958; div. 1979)
- Children: 2
- Awards: National Women's Hall of Fame, Time "Top Thinkers of the 20th Century", Woman of the Year 1977, New York Public Library's: Book of the Century, 20 Honorary degrees
- Scientific career
- Fields: Psychiatry, hospice, palliative care, bioethics, grief, author
- Workplaces: University of Chicago

Elisabeth Kübler-Ross (born Elisabeth Kübler, Swiss Standard German: [ˈkyːblər]; July 8, 1926 – August 24, 2004) was a Swiss and American psychiatrist, a pioneer in near-death studies, author, and developer of the five stages of grief, also known as the "Kübler-Ross model".

In 1970, Kübler-Ross delivered the Ingersoll Lecture at Harvard University, focusing on her book, On Death and Dying (1969). By July 1982, Kübler-Ross had taught 125,000 students in death and dying courses in colleges, seminaries, medical schools, hospitals, and social-work institutions. In 1999, the New York Public Library named On Death and Dying one of its "Books of the Century", and Time magazine recognized her as one of the "100 Most Important Thinkers" of the 20th century. Throughout her career, Kübler-Ross received over 100 awards, including twenty honorary degrees, and was inducted into the National Women's Hall of Fame in 2007. In 2024, Simon & Schuster released a list of their 100 most notable books, including Kübler-Ross's On Death & Dying.

== Early life and education ==
Elisabeth Kübler was born on July 8, 1926, in Zurich, Switzerland, into a Protestant Christian family. She was one of a set of triplets, two of whom were identical. Her life was jeopardized due to complications, weighing only 2 pounds at birth, but she said she survived due to her mother's love and attentiveness.

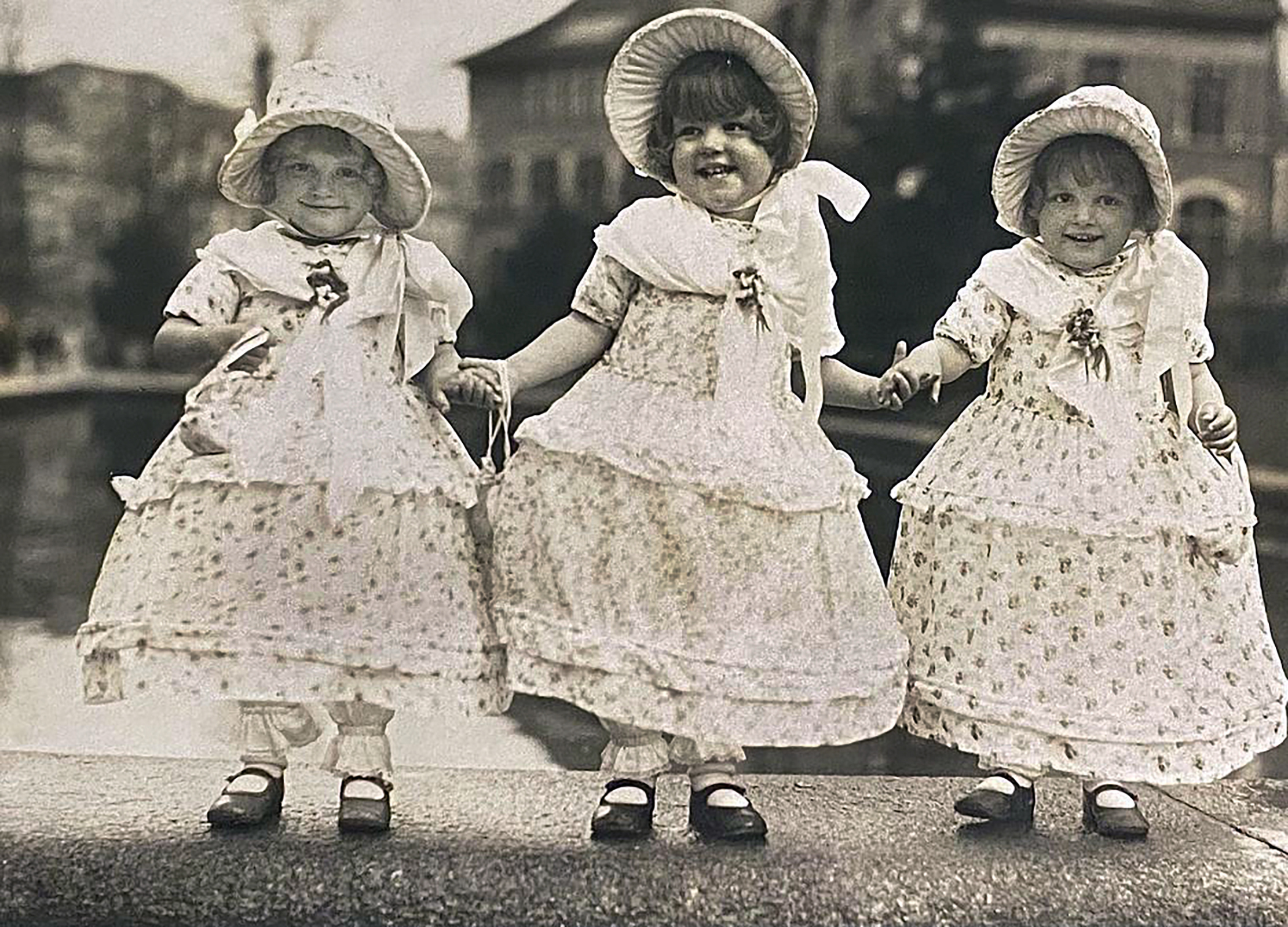
Triplets: Elisabeth Kübler, Eva Kübler, Erika Kübler, Zurich, Switzerland, 1930

During World War II, at only thirteen years of age, Kübler-Ross worked as a laboratory assistant for refugees in Zurich. From a young age, she was determined to become a doctor, despite her father's efforts to force her to become a secretary for his business. She refused him and left home at 16. On May 8, 1945, at the age of eighteen, she joined the International Voluntary Service as an activist.

In 1947, Kübler visited the Majdanek concentration camp in Poland, an experience that profoundly affected her understanding of compassion and the resilience of the human spirit. The harrowing stories of survivors left an indelible mark on her, inspiring her life's mission to assist and heal others. She was also profoundly affected by the images of hundreds of butterflies carved into some of the walls there. To Kübler-Ross, the butterflies—these final works of art by those children facing death—stayed with her for years and influenced her thinking about the end of life.

After returning to Zurich, Kübler-Ross worked for a dermatologist named Dr. Kan Zehnder at the Canton Hospital as an apprentice. After this time, she worked to support herself in a variety of jobs, gaining major experience in hospitals while volunteering to provide aid to refugees. Following this, she went on to attend the University of Zurich to study medicine, and graduated in 1957.

== Career ==
=== Academic career ===
After graduating from the University of Zurich in 1957, Kübler-Ross moved to New York in 1958 to work and continue her studies.

She commenced her psychiatric residency in the Manhattan State Hospital on July 6, 1959, marking the beginning of her career working by creating her own treatments for those who were schizophrenic along with those faced with the title "hopeless patient", a term used at the time to reference terminal patients. These treatment programs would work to restore the patient's sense of dignity and self-respect. Kübler-Ross also intended to reduce the medications that kept these patients overly sedated, and found ways to help them relate to the outside world. During this time, Ross was horrified by the neglect and abuse of psychiatric patients as well as the imminently dying. She found that the patients were often treated with little care or completely ignored by the hospital staff. This realization made her strive to make a difference in the lives of these individuals. She developed a program that focused on the individual care and attention for each patient. This program worked incredibly well, and resulted in significant improvement in the mental health of 94% of her patients.

In 1962, she accepted a position at the University of Colorado School of Medicine in Denver where she completed a fellowship and served on the faculty. There, as a junior faculty member, she gave her first interview of a young terminally ill woman in front of a roomful of medical students. Her intentions were not to be an example of pathology, but she wanted to depict a human being who desired to be understood as she was coping with her illness and how it has impacted her life. She stated to her students:

Now you are reacting like human beings instead of scientists. Maybe now you'll not only know how a dying patient feels but you will also be able to treat them with compassion – the same compassion that you would want for yourself.

Kübler-Ross completed her training in psychiatry in 1963, and moved to Chicago in 1965. She sometimes questioned the practices of traditional psychiatry that she observed. She also undertook 39 months of classical psychoanalysis training in Chicago. She became an instructor at the University of Chicago's Pritzker School of Medicine, where she began to conduct a regular weekly educational seminar consisting of live interviews with terminally ill patients. She had her students participate in these despite a large amount of resistance from the medical staff.

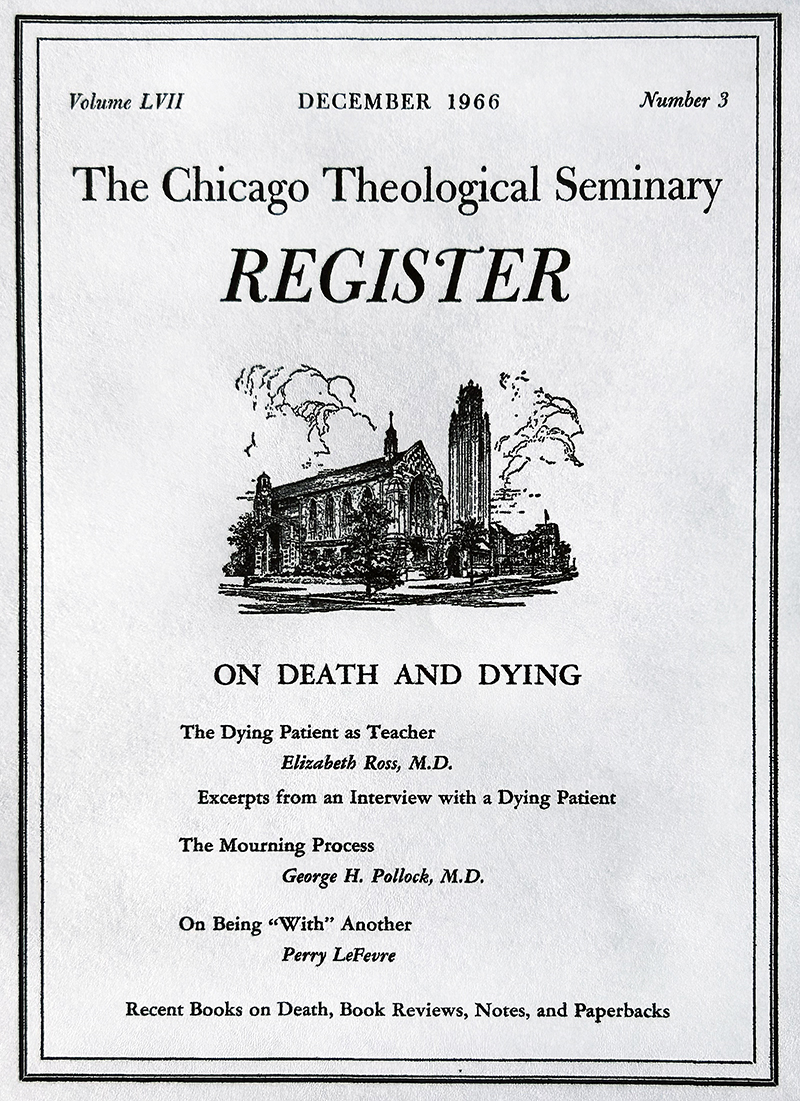
The Chicago Theological Seminary Register, Volume LVII, Number 3, – On Death & Dying – "The Dying Patient as Teacher" by Elisabeth Ross M.D., December 1966

By 1966, Kübler-Ross was giving regular weekly seminars on dying patients at her hospital. In late 1966, she wrote a seventeen-page article titled "The Dying Patient as Teacher: An Experiment and an Experience" for the December issue of The Chicago Theological Seminary Journal, which was themed "On Death and Dying". Although she expressed concerns about her English proficiency, the editor reassured her. Despite the journal's limited circulation, a copy of her article reached an editor at Macmillan Publishing Company in New York City. Consequently, on July 7, 1967, Macmillan offered Kübler-Ross a contract to expand her work into a 256-page book titled On Death & Dying. Coincidentally, just six days later, on July 13, 1967, St. Christopher's Hospice, the first modern hospice, admitted its inaugural patient. The book was officially registered with the US copyright office on May 19, 1969. Despite delays, the book was eventually published in November 1969 and quickly became a best-seller, profoundly altering her life. Notably, as of December 18, 1976, On Death & Dying remained on the New York Times Best Seller list for trade paperbacks, listing at #3.

In November 1969, Life magazine ran an article on Kübler-Ross, bringing public awareness to her work outside of the medical community. The response was enormous and influenced Kübler-Ross's decision to focus her career on working with the terminally ill and their families. The intense scrutiny her work received also had an impact on her career path. Kübler-Ross stopped teaching at the university to work privately on what she called the "greatest mystery in science"—death.

During the 1970's, Kübler-Ross became a champion of the worldwide hospice movement. She traveled to over twenty countries on six continents initiating various hospice and palliative care programs. In 1970, Kübler-Ross spoke at the prestigious Ingersoll Lecture at Harvard University on the subject of death and dying. On August 7, 1972, she spoke to the United States Senate Special Committee on Aging to promote the "Death With Dignity" movement. In 1977, she was named "Woman of the Year" by Ladies' Home Journal. In 1978, Kübler-Ross cofounded the American Holistic Medical Association.

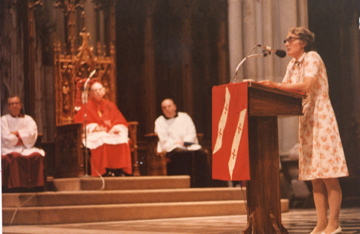
Elisabeth Kubler-Ross speech attended by Cardinal Terence Cooke, 1970's

=== Healing center in California ===
Kübler-Ross was one of the central figures in the hospice care movement, believing that euthanasia prevents people from completing their "unfinished business".

In 1977, she founded "Shanti Nilaya" (Home of Peace) on forty acres of land in Escondido, California. At this time, Kübler-Ross began conducting "Life, Death, and Transition (LTD) workshops with the goal of assisting people to resolve their "unfinished business", using Shanti Nilaya as a setting for some of these five-day workshops. She also intended it as a healing center for the dying and their families. She was also a co-founder of the American Holistic Medical Association during this time period.

In the late 1970s, after interviewing thousands of patients who had died and been resuscitated, Kübler-Ross became interested in out-of-body experiences, mediumship, spiritualism, and other ways of attempting to contact the dead. This led to a scandal connected to the Shanti Nilaya Healing Center, in which she was duped by Jay Barham, founder of the Church of the Facet of the Divinity. Claiming he could channel the spirits of the departed and summon ethereal "entities", he encouraged church members to engage in sexual relations with the "spirits". He may have hired several women to play the parts of female spirits for this purpose. Kübler-Ross's friend Deanna Edwards was invited to attend a service to ascertain whether allegations against Barham were true. He was found to be naked and wearing only a turban when Edwards unexpectedly pulled masking tape off the light switch and flipped on the light. Despite the accusation of sexual misconduct Kübler-Ross defended him for over a year. The authorities did not press charges against the Barhams. Kübler-Ross announced the ending of her association with both Jay Barham and his wife Martha in her Shanti Nilaya Newsletter (issue 7) on June 7, 1981.

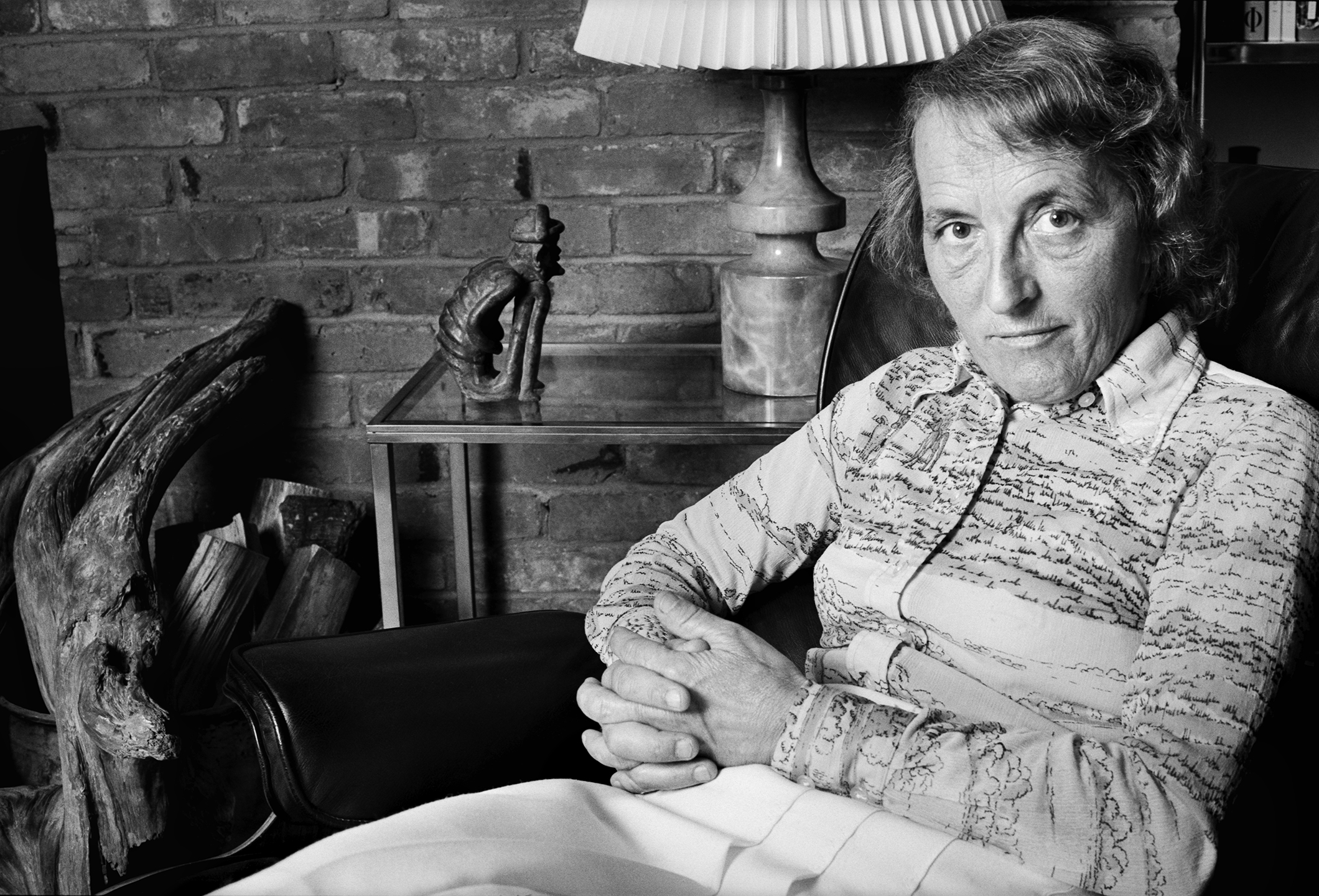
Elisabeth Kübler-Ross photographed by Lynn Gilbert

=== Investigations on near-death experiences ===
Kübler-Ross also dealt with the phenomenon of near-death experience. She was also an advocate for spiritual guides and the afterlife, serving on the Advisory Board of the International Association for Near-Death Studies (IANDS). Kübler-Ross reported her interviews with the dying for the first time in her book, On Death and Dying: What the Dying Have to Teach Doctors, Nurses, Clergy, and Their Own Families (1969). Originally, this book had a thirteenth chapter on near-death experiences but her colleagues strongly advised her to remove it for the sake of public acceptance, which she did before the book went to press.

In 1981, she appeared on an Australian radio documentary about death and near-death experiences that aired on the ABC, And When I Die, Will I Be Dead? It was adapted into a book in 1987.

Kübler-Ross went on to write several books about near-death experiences (NDEs). Her book On Life After Death (1991) was compiled from three lectures she gave:

- "Leben und Sterben" (Living and Dying), a speech she made in Switzerland in December 1982 in the German language.
- "There is no Death", given in San Diego in 1977.
- "Life, Death, and Life After Death", a recorded lecture she gave in 1980.

The English-language edition sold over 200,000 copies. The German-language edition was also a bestseller, with hundreds of thousands sold.

Another book, The Tunnel and The Light (1999), originally entitled Death is of Vital Importance, was also composed of various lectures she had previously given.

=== Life, Death, and Transition workshops ===
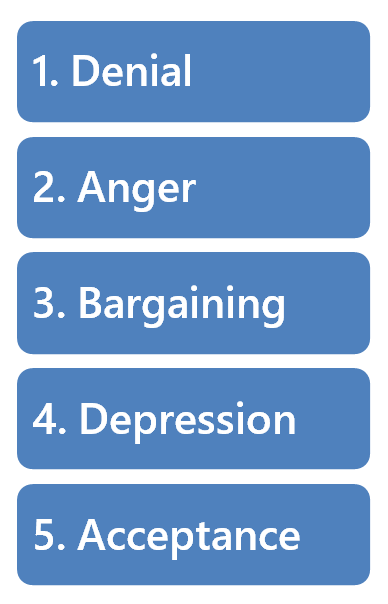
Kübler-Ross five stages of grief: denial, anger, bargaining, depression and acceptance.

In the late 1970s, Kübler-Ross developed a series of 5-day residential workshops aimed at helping individuals who were nearing the end of their lives to live more fully during their remaining time. These workshops were designed to accommodate not only the dying but also their caregivers, who were encouraged to participate in the sessions. The workshops provided a forum for patients to share their stories and express their fears, anger, and grief regarding their impending death. A recurring theme in the workshops was addressing regrets associated with perceived wasted time and energy related to unresolved childhood issues such as abuse and neglect. These unresolved issues often manifested as misplaced anger, perfectionism, controlling behavior, prioritization of material wealth over relationships, feelings of unworthiness, and a lack of meaning.

To address the intensity of these emotions, Kübler-Ross incorporated techniques to help participants externalize their emotions, including the release of buried rage, grief, and fear. This approach often facilitated a deeper understanding and resolution of long-standing pain, leading to a transformation of fear and grief into gratitude. Recognizing that caregivers also benefited from the workshops, Dr. Kübler-Ross opened the sessions to anyone seeking to live more fully until death.

A distinctive feature of the workshops was the use of impromptu crayon drawings, a technique influenced by the work of Jungian analyst Dr. Susan Bach. Kübler-Ross instructed participants on drawing interpretation to help uncover unconscious reasons for their attendance and to address past losses. Additionally, she presented a model of human development encompassing four parts—emotional, intellectual, physical, and spiritual—referred to as "The Four Quadrants", which forms the basis of her work in the beginnings of the palliative care movement. She also addressed what she called "the five core emotions"—fear, anger, natural jealousy, grief, and love—and their natural expressions and distortions.

=== Work with children ===
Throughout her career, Kübler-Ross extensively studied and wrote about children's perceptions of death. Her notable works include The Dougy Letter (1979), Living with Death and Dying (1981), and On Children and Dying (1983). These books explore how children understand, discuss, and respond to death, reflecting her insights into the unique ways children express their experiences and fears.

Kübler-Ross's work was partly driven by requests from patients and readers seeking a deeper understanding of the language used by terminally ill children to articulate their needs. In Living with Death and Dying (1981), she argues that children have a more nuanced awareness of death than often assumed and are more willing to discuss it openly.

Influenced by the work of Susan Bach and Gregg Furth, Kübler-Ross examined how children's drawings serve as a crucial means of communication. She identified two distinct types of communication related to death in children. "Nonverbal Symbolic Language" is used by younger children, who may express their understanding of death through drawings, pictures, or objects, as they might lack the verbal skills to articulate their feelings directly. As children grow older, they may transition to "Verbal Symbolic Language", characterized by complex stories and unusual questions that serve to express their emotions and concerns about death. Children may be fearful of asking direct questions regarding their death, so they may come up with stories or strange questions that will meet their needs. This form of communication reflects their evolving ability to articulate their feelings and fears, though they may still struggle with direct inquiries about death.

=== AIDS work ===
During a time when patients suffering from AIDS were being disowned and discriminated against for their illness, Kübler-Ross accepted them with open arms. She conducted many workshops on life, death, grief, and AIDS in different parts of the world, teaching about the disease and working to reduce the stigma surrounding it. Later, she created a workshop meant solely for patients who had contracted AIDS; even though the majority of people who contracted AIDS at that time were gay men, women and children also contracted the disease. This surprised her, as she had not expected just how many children and babies had contracted the terminal illness. She noted in her book that babies typically contracted the disease through the mother or father or through contaminated blood transfusions, also remarking that older children that had the disease may have contracted it due to sexual assault from someone who was HIV-seropositive.

=== Prison hospices ===
During this period, Kübler-Ross developed an interest in the concept of prison hospice care. In the mid-1980's, the prison facility at Vacaville, California emerged as the primary site for delivering healthcare services to incarcerated individuals. In 1984, Kübler-Ross delegated one of her staff members, Irene Smith to conduct an investigative assessment of conditions at this institution. Subsequently, Kübler-Ross enlisted the aid of Nancy Jaicks Alexander, a workshop leader in Kübler-Ross's Life, Death, and Transition (LDT) workshops, to further explore avenues for enhancing end-of-life care for AIDS patients confined at the Vacaville facility. Alexander and her husband, Robert, went on to co-found the first prison hospice in 1992. Concurrently, Kübler-Ross pursued additional prison-related initiatives in Hawaii, Ireland and Scotland throughout the 1980s. In June 1991, she held her first LDT workshop inside a prison at Edinburgh's Saughton Prison (HM Prison).

One of her greatest wishes was to build a hospice for abandoned infants and children infected with HIV to give them a lasting home where they could live until their death. Kübler-Ross attempted to set this up in the late 1980s in Virginia, but local residents feared the possibility of infection and blocked the necessary re-zoning. In October 1994, she lost her house and many possessions, including photos, journals, and notes, to an arson fire that is suspected to have been set by opponents of her AIDS work.

=== Legacy and contributions ===
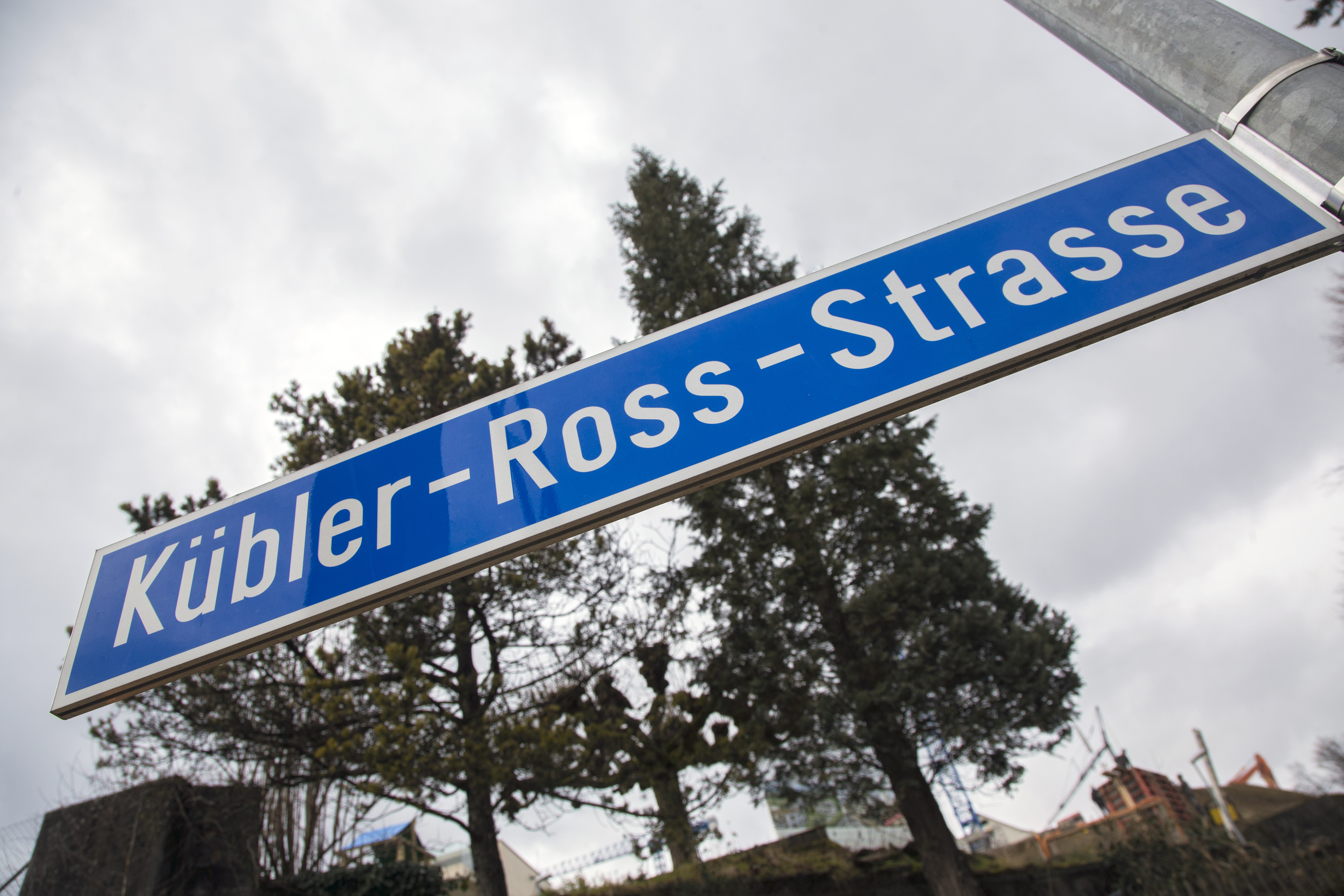
Street named after Kübler-Ross in Meilen, Switzerland

Kübler-Ross changed the way that the world looks at the terminally ill; she pioneered hospice care, palliative care, bioethics, and near-death research, and was the first to bring terminally ill individuals' lives to the public eye. Kübler-Ross was the driving force behind the movement for doctors and nurses alike to "treat the dying with dignity". Balfour Mount, the first palliative care physician in Canada and the person who coined the term palliative care, credits Kübler-Ross with sparking his interest in end-of-life care. Kübler-Ross wrote over 20 books on death and dying, which have been translated into 44 languages. At the end of her life she was mentally active, co-authoring two books with David Kessler including On Grief and Grieving (2005). In 2018 Stanford University acquired the Kübler-Ross archives from her family and has started building a digital library of her papers, interviews and other archival material.

Following extensive work with dying patients, Kübler-Ross published On Death and Dying in 1969, in which she proposed the now famous "five stages" model as a pattern of adjustment: denial, anger, bargaining, depression, and acceptance. This model has since become widely accepted in academia and by the general public. In the graphic that was included in On Death & Dying, Kübler-Ross mentions other emotions as being a part of this journey, including shock, partial denial, preparatory grief (anticipatory grief), hope, and decathexis.

The five-stage model has received some criticism by academics, who argue against approaches that universally apply it to all bereaved groups or claim that grief should be expressed in a set number of rigidly linear stages. Kübler-Ross, with colleague David Kessler in On Grief and Grieving, cautioned that the stages "are not stops on some linear timeline in grief. Not everyone goes through all of them or in a prescribed order". Dr. Allan Kellehear responded to the critics in the 40th anniversary edition's introduction to On Death & Dying the following, "the so-called 'stage theory' that you will read in this book is openly described and discussed as a heuristic device. In other words, these stages are merely a set of categories artificially isolated and separately described so that the author can discuss each of these experiences more clearly and simply. The careful reader will note Kübler-Ross's own repeated warnings that many of these 'stages' overlap, occur together, or even that some reactions are missed altogether. To emphasize this conditional way of talking about stages, the word 'stages' was even put in inverted commas to emphasize their tentative nature in the only diagrammatic representation of these ideas in the book."

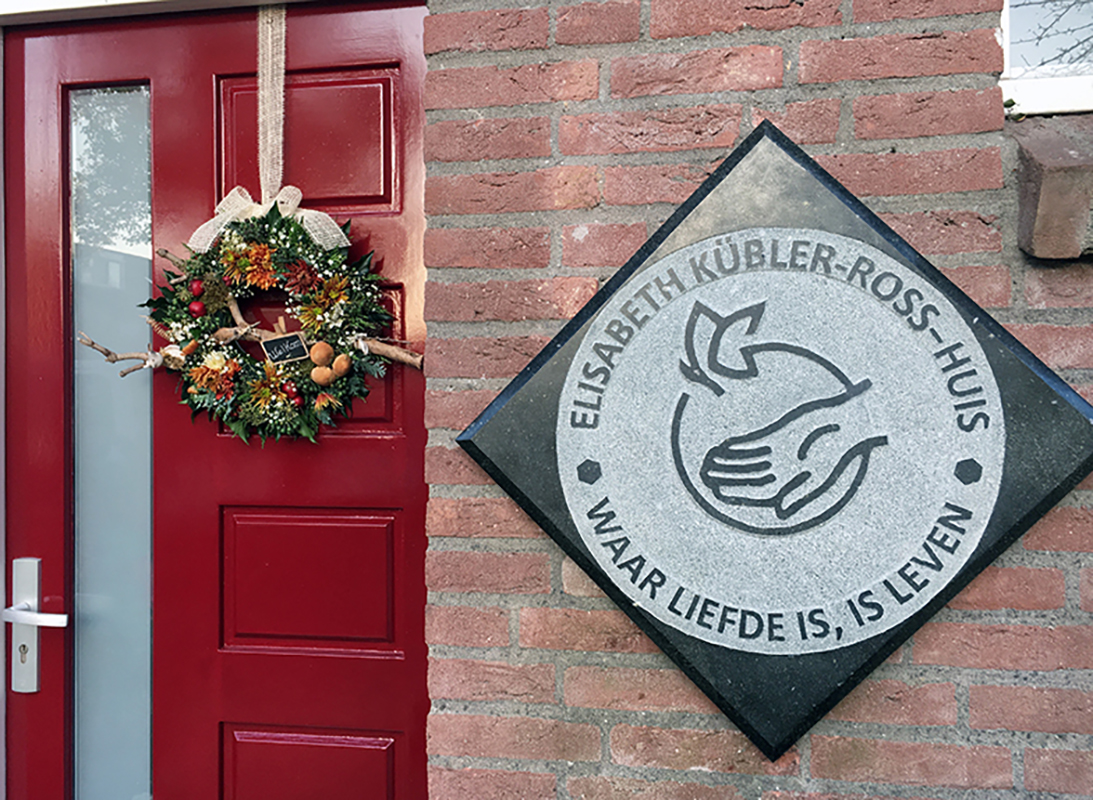
The first hospice in the Netherlands is named after Kübler-Ross

The Elisabeth Kübler-Ross Foundation continues her work through a series of international chapters around the world. She received many awards and honors during her career, including honorary degrees from various universities, and is featured in a photograph exhibit at the Virginia headquarters of the National Hospice and Palliative Care Organization. The American Journal of Bioethics devoted its entire December 2019 issue to the 50th anniversary of On Death and Dying. For instance, in his article "Everything I Really Needed to Know to Be a Clinical Ethicist, I Learned From Elisabeth Kübler-Ross", American bioethicist Mark G. Kuczewski outlined how Kübler-Ross laid the foundation for clinical bioethics and emphasized the need to listen to patients for understanding their needs and improving their quality of life.

== Personal life ==
In 1958, she married a fellow medical student and classmate from the United States, Emanuel "Manny" Ross, and moved to New York. Together, they completed their internships at Long Island's Glen Cove Community Hospital in New York. After they married, she had their first child in 1960, a son named Kenneth, and in 1963, a daughter named Barbara. The marriage ended in 1979. They remained friends until his death on December 9, 1992.

=== Final years and death ===
Kübler-Ross endured a sequence of strokes from 1987 to 1994, none of which imposed lasting physical limitations upon her. Following a Virginia house fire on October 6, 1994, and subsequent transient ischemic attack (TIA), she relocated to Scottsdale, Arizona. During this period, the Healing Waters Farm and the Elisabeth Kübler-Ross Center ceased operations in Headwaters, Virginia. The following month, she acquired a residence in the desert near Carefree, Arizona. After suffering a larger stroke in May 1995, she found herself living in a wheelchair and wished to be able to determine her time of death.

In 1997, Oprah Winfrey flew to Arizona to interview Kübler-Ross and discuss with her whether she herself was going through the five stages of grief. July 2001 saw her traveling to Switzerland to celebrate her 75th birthday with her triplet sisters. In a 2002 interview with The Arizona Republic, she stated that she was ready for death and even welcomed it, calling God a "damned procrastinator".

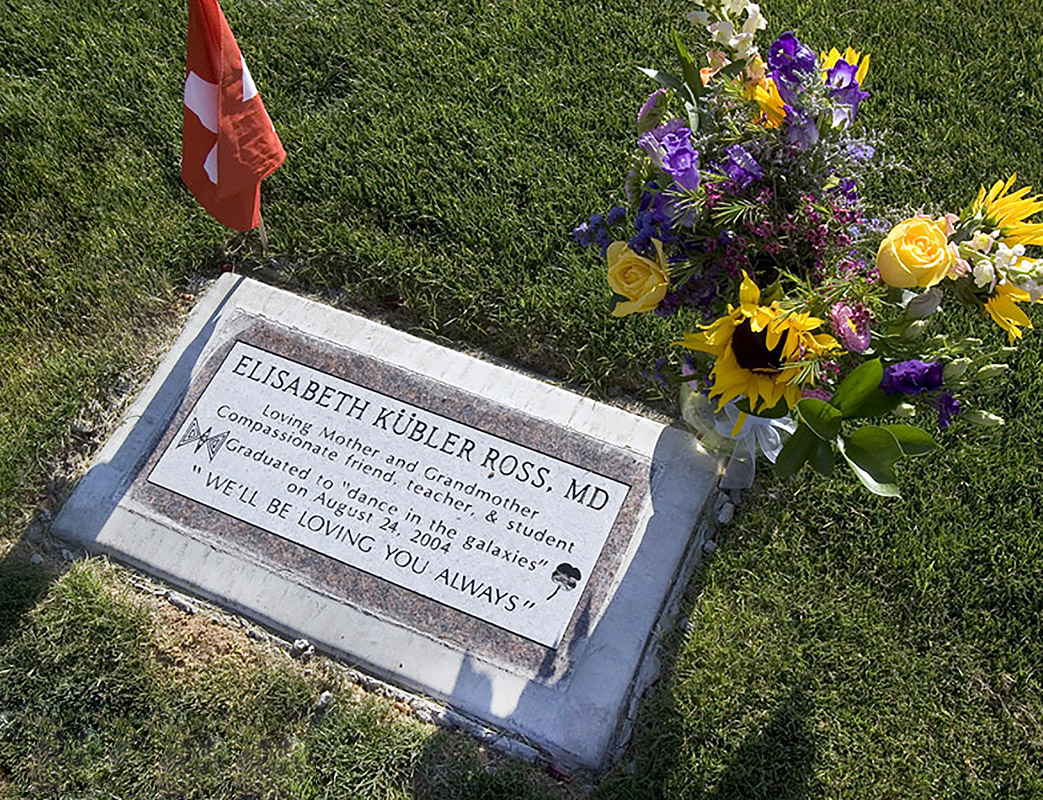
Elisabeth Kübler-Ross's gravesite, Paradise Memorial Gardens, Scottsdale, Arizona

With her two children at her side in Scottsdale on August 24, 2004, Kübler-Ross finally died of natural causes. She was 78. She was buried at the Paradise Memorial Gardens Cemetery in Scottsdale.

== Legacy ==
In 2005 Kübler-Ross's son, Ken Ross, founded the Elisabeth Kübler-Ross Foundation in Scottsdale, Arizona. The trademark 'Elisabeth Kübler-Ross,' along with all associated copyrights, is managed by her children through the Elisabeth Kübler-Ross Family Limited Partnership.

Stanford University's Green Library currently houses Kübler-Ross's remaining archives, which are available for study.

== Selected bibliography ==
- On Death & Dying (Simon & Schuster/Touchstone), 1969.
- Questions & Answers on Death & Dying (Simon & Schuster/Touchstone), 1972
- Death: The Final Stage of Growth (Simon & Schuster/Touchstone), 1974
- To Live Until We Say Goodbye (Simon & Schuster/Touchstone), 1978
- The Dougy Letter – A Letter to a Dying Child (Celestial Arts/Ten Speed Press), 1979
- Quest, Biography of EKR (Written with Derek Gill), (Harper & Row), 1980
- Working It Through (Simon & Schuster/Touchstone), 1981
- Living with Death & Dying (Simon & Schuster/Touchstone), 1981.
- Remember the Secret (Celestial Arts/Ten Speed Press), 1981
- On Children & Death (Simon & Schuster), 1985
- AIDS: The Ultimate Challenge (Simon & Schuster), 1988
- On Life After Death (Celestial Arts), 1991.
- Jedes Ende ist ein strahlender Beginn (Every Ending is a Bright Beginning) (German Language) 1992
- Death Is of Vital Importance (The Tunnel and the Light), 1995.
- Unfolding the Wings of Love (Germany only – Silberschnur), 1996
- Making the Most of the Inbetween (Various Foreign), 1996
- AIDS & Love, The Conference in Barcelona (Spain), 1996
- The Wheel of Life: A Memoir of Living and Dying (Simon & Schuster/Scribner), 1997
- Sehnsucht nach Hause (Longing to Go Back Home) (German Language only), 1998
- Warum wir hier sind (Why Are We Here) (German Language only), 1999.
- The Tunnel and the Light (Avalon), 1999
- Life Lessons: Two Experts on Death and Dying Teach Us About the Mysteries of Life and Living, with David Kessler, Scribner, 2001.
- On Grief and Grieving: Finding the Meaning of Grief Through the Five Stages of Loss, with David Kessler. Scribner, 2005. ISBN 0-7432-6628-5.
- Real Taste of Life: A photographic Journal, 2003.
- Is There Life After Death, Audio/CD, Sounds True, ISBN 9781591793786, 2005
- The American Journal of Bioethics – Special Issue: 50th Anniversary of On Death & Dying by Elisabeth Kubler-Ross, 2019
