= Glen Maxey =

American politician

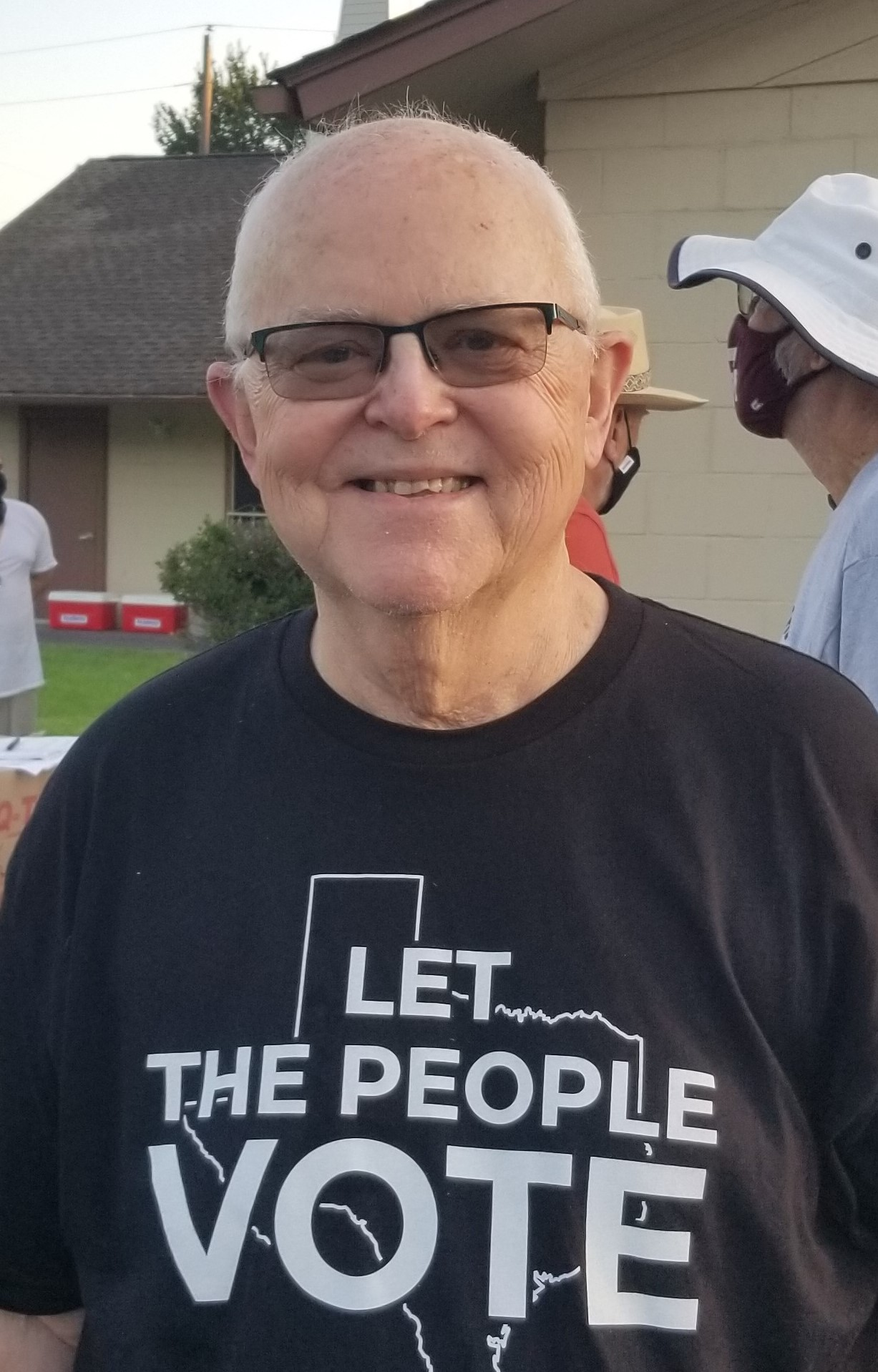
- Maxey in 2021

Member of the Texas House of Representatives from the 51st district
- In office 1991–2003
- Preceded by: Lena Guerrero
- Succeeded by: Eddie Rodriguez

Personal details
- Born: February 23, 1952 (age 74)
- Party: Democratic
- Website: www.glenmaxey.com

Glen Maxey (born February 23, 1952) is an American politician from Austin, Texas, who was the first openly gay member of the Texas Legislature. Active in the fight for gay rights, Maxey was a central figure in the establishment of facilities for the education and care of HIV-infected individuals, especially the AIDS Services of Austin (ASA). In 2008, he was an unsuccessful candidate for Tax Assessor-Collector in Travis County, Texas.

== Early life and education ==
Maxey is the son of Byron Hale Maxey and Mary Ursula Ocker. His family ran a traveling rodeo. Maxey was educated at Sam Houston State University. He holds a Bachelor of Science Degree and Master of Education degree from Sam Houston State University.

Maxey taught fifth grade and worked as a reading and math specialist working with migrant students in Navasota, Texas.

== Political involvement and activism ==
Maxey first entered politics in 1968 as a volunteer on the Texas Democratic Primary campaign of Senator Eugene McCarthy.

While teaching school, Maxey continued to volunteer for local, state and federal campaigns. In 1980, while teaching in Navasota, Maxey joined the successful campaign of Kent Caperton, a candidate for the Texas State Senate. Caperton, a young Bryan attorney who was seeking to unseat the legendary "Bull of the Brazos," William T. "Bill" Moore. Moore had held the Senate seat centered around Bryan for thirty-two years before Caperton defeated him in the Democratic primary that year. After the election, Maxey joined Caperton's staff in 1981 as a legislative aide.

The following year, Maxey ran for an open House seat in College Station against House Appropriations Committee Chairman Bill Presnal in the Democratic primary, and later joined the campaign of Jim Hightower, who was then a candidate for Texas Agriculture Commissioner.

In November 1982, Maxey joined the staff of Democratic State Senator Oscar Mauzy, who was Dean of the Texas Senate (longest serving member) at the time, and became his Chief Legislative Aide.

While on Mauzy's staff, Maxey was active in HIV/AIDS activism, and urged Mauzy to become involved in the case of a man suffering from HIV who had been threatened with quarantine by the Texas Board of Health. In 2001, Maxey discussed this watershed moment in HIV and AIDS awareness in an interview with the Austin Chronicle:

As Maxey recalls the episode, "It was very early in the AIDS crisis, the disease wasn't very well understood, and the commissioner of health began talking about declaring HIV a 'quarantinable disease.' I was working with AIDS activists, and I went to Mauzy and asked him could we get involved. He answered, as he always did, 'Well, get something organized.' So we called committee hearings, and I contacted Dr. Mathilde Krim, at the time the foremost authority on AIDS and an advocate for patients. She came down here and testified against the quarantine.".

In 1987, Maxey left Mauzy's staff and became the first Executive Director of the Lesbian/Gay Rights Lobby of Texas.

== Legislative service ==
In 1991, Maxey was elected to the Texas House from the Austin seat held by Lena Guerrero, who had been appointed by Governor Ann Richards to the Texas Railroad Commission.

Serving from 1991 to 2003, Maxey passed hundreds of bills and substantive amendments and played a leading role in passing the Children's Health Insurance Program.

During his six terms in the Texas House, Maxey served on committees including Appropriations, Public Health, Administration, Pensions and Investments, Cultural Affairs and Human Services. He has been the most prolific bill sponsor in the Texas House. During his last terms in that body, Maxey passed more legislation than any other single member of that body.

During his tenure in the Texas House, Maxey was also a key player in the group of House members that helped elect Pete Laney Speaker of the Texas House of Representatives and reformed that body's rules.

While passing hundreds of bills through the process, Maxey was also well known for his abilities to defeat bad legislation through use of the rules and parliamentary procedures. He was a founding member of the Texas Legislative Study Group, a membership organization of legislators who banded together to work on progressive legislative issues. He served as floor whip for the LSG members for four sessions.

== Awards and honors ==
Maxey has won numerous other awards for his public service. He has been recognized as Legislator of the Year by several dozens of advocacy organizations, including on three occasions by the Sierra Club. Common Cause of Texas awarded him the "Star of Texas" award for his work in reforming the House rules of procedure. He has won accolades and awards from the Grey Panthers, Public Citizen, the Austin Police Association, the Brain Injury Association, the Texas Network of Youth Services, United Cerebral Palsy, the Save Our Springs Coalition, ADAPT of Texas, the Texas Nurses Association, Coalition of Persons with Disabilities, Consumers Union, Advocacy, Inc, the Texas AIDS Network, the Human Rights Campaign and many others. Maxey has been voted "Best Legislator" in the Austin Chronicle Reader's Poll on eight separate occasions.

On May 27, 2022, Maxey was awarded The Presidential Lifetime Achievement Award on the House floor of the Texas Capitol. That same day he received a proclamation to the city of Austin with May 27 being declared “Glen Maxey Day”. The proclamation reads:

“WHEREAS, Glen Maxey passed hundreds of bills and substantive amendments and was well known for his ability to defeat bad legislation through the use of the rules and parliamentary procedures; and

WHEREAS, Glen Maxey gained national and local attention for being the first openly gay legislature of the Texas Legislature and becoming one of the leading advocates for LGBT rights in America; and

WHEREAS, Glen Maxey played a leading role in passing the Children’s Health Insurance Program; and

WHEREAS, in six terms, Maxey served on committees including Appropriations, Public Health, Administration, Pensions, and Investments and was the most prolific bill sponsor in the Texas House, passing more legislation than any other member of the body; and

NOW, THEREFORE, it is fitting and proper for I, Steve Adler, Mayor of the City of Austin, Texas, do hereby proclaim and extend grateful appreciation to Glen Maxey for his impact on our city, county, state, and country.”

== Legislative retirement and later political activities ==
Maxey's final term in the Texas House ended in January, 2003. Maxey was among many veteran House members who announced their retirement following the 2001 Legislative Session.

Since retiring from office, he has worked as a lobbyist and public affairs adviser. He ran the Travis County Democratic Party's 2004 coordinated campaign and served as field director in the 2006 coordinated campaign effort.

Maxey was a candidate for the Chairmanship of the Texas Democratic Party in 2006. The same year, he served as statewide field director for the gubernatorial campaign of Democrat Chris Bell.

In the summer of 2007, Maxey announced his candidacy for Travis County Tax Assessor-Collector. He was beaten by a 74% to 26% margin in the March 2008 Democratic primary by incumbent Nelda Wells Spears.

Maxey is currently the Legislative Affairs Director of the Texas Democratic Party.

== See also ==
- LGBT rights in Texas

== Sources ==
- Austin Chronicle, December 7, 2001

| Preceded by Lena Guerrero | Member of the Texas House of Representatives from District 51 (Austin); 1991–2003 | Succeeded by Eddie Rodriguez |
