= Atlas of the Heart =

2021 non-fiction book by Brené Brown

- First edition
- Author: Brené Brown
- Publisher: Random House
- Publication date: November 30, 2021
- Pages: 336
- ISBN: 978-0-399-59255-3

Atlas of the Heart is a 2021 non-fiction book written by Brené Brown. The book describes human emotions and experiences and the language used to understand them. It is a USA Today bestseller and was developed into a five-episode series for HBO Max. A portion of the series premiered at SXSW on March 11, 2022.

== Content ==
The book identifies 87 emotions and experiences, organizes them into 13 categories, and describes each. It then explores cultivating meaningful connections.
