= Lulu Flores =

American politician

Member of the Texas House of Representatives from the 51st district
- Incumbent
- Assumed office January 10, 2023
- Preceded by: Eddie Rodriguez

Personal details
- Born: September 27, 1955 (age 71)
- Party: Democratic
- Spouse: Scott Hendler
- Children: 5
- Education: University of Texas, Austin (BA, JD)
- Occupation: Attorney
- Website: Campaign website

Maria Luisa "Lulu" Flores (born September 27, 1955) is an American politician and attorney who is a Democratic member of the Texas House of Representatives from 51st district. She took office in January 2023.

== Background ==
Born on September 27, 1955, Flores grew up along the U.S.–Mexico border and is the youngest of nine children. Her father was an attorney and among the founding members of League of United Latin American Citizens (LULAC). She graduated from the University of Texas at Austin with a bachelor's degree in government in 1977 and earned her Juris Doctor from the University of Texas Law School in 1980. After law school, Flores became the chief of staff for Representative Irma Rangel (D–Kingsville), the first Mexican American woman to serve in the Texas House of Representatives.

Flores is an attorney and, with her husband Scott Hendler, is a partner at Hendler Flores Law, PLLC. She served as a delegate for Hillary Clinton's 2016 presidential campaign.

== Texas House of Representatives ==
Flores ran in for office in 2022 to represent district 51 of the Texas House of Representatives. She won a crowded Democratic primary, receiving about 60% of the vote. She was endorsed by the editorial board of the Austin American-Statesman. In the general election, Flores received 84.4% of the vote, defeating Republican challenger Robert Reynolds.

Flores was sworn in on January 10, 2023, succeeding Eddie Rodriguez. She has said her biggest legislative priority is reducing property taxes and increasing funding for public education. She is a member of the Texas House of Representatives LGBT Caucus and supports Senator Carol Alvarado's (D–Houston) legislation to give more freedom to physicians to provide abortions based on medical judgment.

Flores is on the following committees: Culture, Recreation and Tourism; Judiciary and Civil Jurisprudence.

== Election history ==
=== 2024 ===
Flores was uncontested in the Democratic primary and the general election.

2024 Texas House of Representatives District 51 general election results
Party	Candidate	Votes	%
Democratic	Lulu Flores (incumbent)	52,801	100.0
Total votes		52,801	100.0

2024 Texas House of Representatives District 51 Democratic primary
Party	Candidate	Votes	%
Democratic	Lulu Flores (incumbent)	8,728	100.0
Total votes		8,728	100.0

=== 2022 ===
2022 Texas House of Representatives District 51 general election results
Party	Candidate	Votes	%
Democratic	Maria Luisa "Lulu" Flores	42,393	84.4
Republican	Robert Reynolds	7,818	15.6
Total votes		50,211	100.0

2022 Texas House of Representatives District 51 Democratic primary
Party	Candidate	Votes	%
Democratic	Maria Luisa "Lulu" Flores	8,074	60.3
Democratic	Cynthia Valadez-Mata	1,525	11.4
Democratic	Matthew Worthington	1,408	10.5
Democratic	Claire Campos-O'Neal	991	7.4
Democratic	Albino Cadenas	635	4.7
Democratic	Mike Hendrix	498	3.7
Democratic	Cody Arn	268	2.0
Total votes		13,399	100.0

=== 2002 ===
2002 Texas House of Representatives District 51 Democratic primary runoff
Party	Candidate	Votes	%
Democratic	Eddie Rodriguez	2,400	51.3
Democratic	Maria Luisa "Lulu" Flores	2,280	48.7
Total votes		4,680	100.0

2002 Texas House of Representatives District 51 Democratic primary
Party	Candidate	Votes	%
Democratic	Maria Luisa "Lulu" Flores	2,361	38.3
Democratic	Eddie Rodriguez	1,445	23.4
Democratic	Marcos De Leon	1,109	18.0
Democratic	Sam Guzman	697	11.3
Democratic	Bill Pool	318	5.2
Democratic	Julia A. Diggs	238	3.9
Total votes		6,168	100.0
