= Project Angel Food =

Nonprofit organization in the U.S.

- Founded: 1989
- Founder: Marianne Williamson
- Type: Feeding the Sick
- Tax ID no.: 95-4115863
- Purpose: AIDS, Diseases
- Location: 922 Vine Street, Los Angeles, CA 90038
- Coordinates: 34°05′16″N 118°19′35″W
- Region served: Los Angeles
- Products: Meals, Catering, Cookies
- Services: Nourish the Sick
- Key people: Founder Marianne Williamson; Executive Director Richard Ayoub; Chairman of the Board Bobby Ralston; Former Executive Director John Giles
- Revenue: $3,777,846
- Employees: 55
- Volunteers: 3,000
- Website: angelfood.org

Project Angel Food is a 501(c)(3) nonprofit organization in Los Angeles County which provides free meals for people too sick to shop and cook for themselves. Project Angel Food serves the majority of Los Angeles County; South Los Angeles and Metro Los Angeles are the two largest service areas for the organization. As of 2017, their clientele is 39% Hispanic and Latino, 29% African-American, 21% non-Hispanic White, and 11% from other races.

== History ==
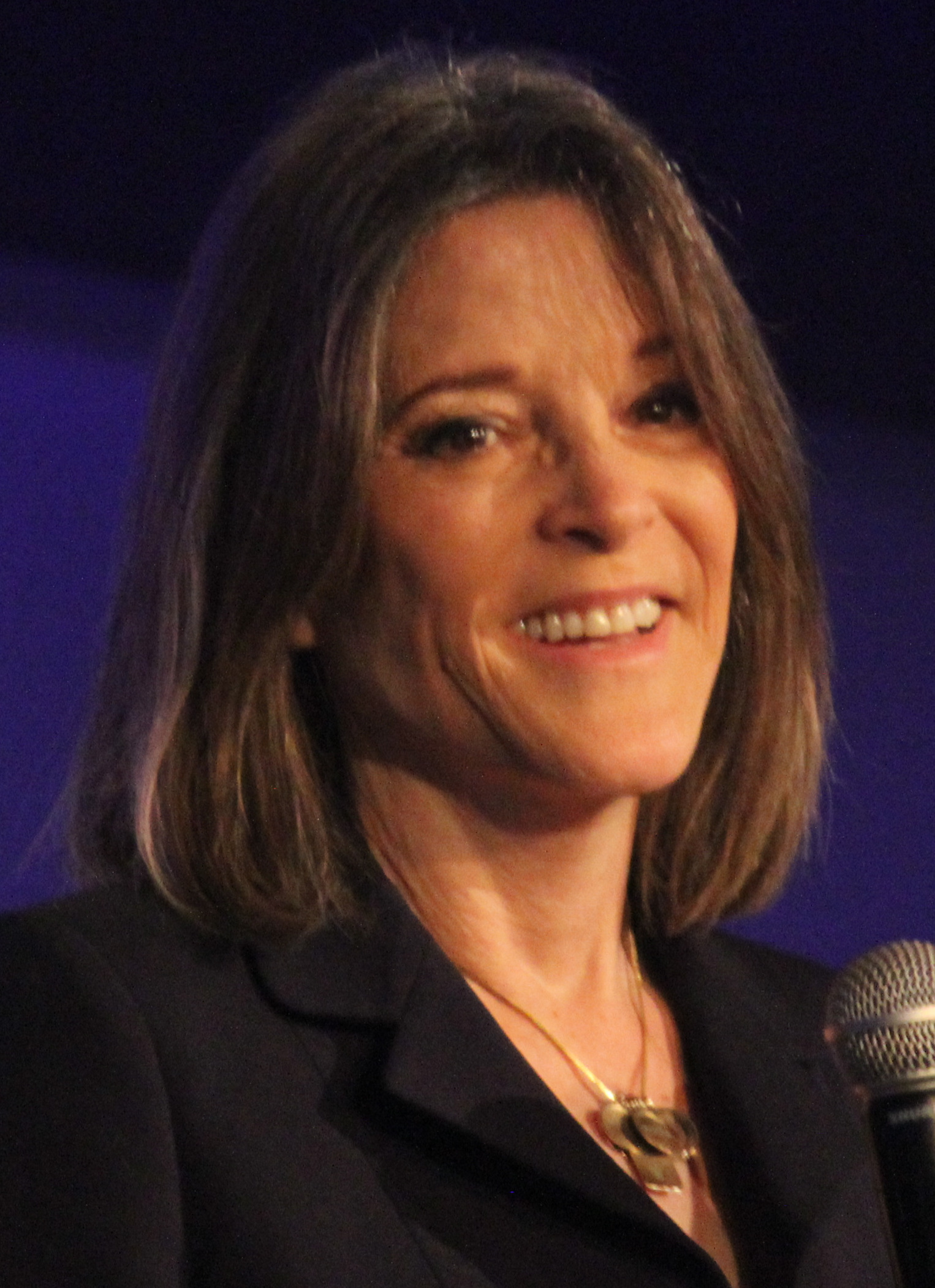
Marianne Williamson, founder of Project Angel Food

=== 1989–1990 ===
The Project Angel Food Program was founded by Marianne Williamson as an outreach program of the Los Angeles Center for Living, which helps people with life-threatening illnesses. The Center for Living provides programs such as The Clean Team, Project Nightlight, and Hospice Care. The Center for Living also prepares lunch for drop-in clients and delivers meals to homebound clients. Louise Hay, Marianne Williamson and David Kessler held the first fundraiser for Project Angel Food and raised $11,000.

In 1990, The Project Angel Food Program moved into the kitchen of the Crescent Heights United Methodist Church. The first "Angel Art," chaired by Berry and Tony Perkins, raised over $540,000. The Center for Living subsequently opened offices on Robertson Boulevard. Due to the needs of the HIV community, the demand for the Project Angel Food Program grows. Project Angel Food has two full-time staff.

=== 1991–1999 ===
With the dramatic increase in HIV/AIDS cases in Los Angeles, the Project Angel Food Program directed its mission to focus on the community affected by the disease. In 1991, the first "Divine Design" was held at the Barker Hangar in Santa Monica, California. Divine Design featured over 50 designer showrooms and a fantasy auction, with experiences featuring a swimming pool painted by David Hockney, a birthday party held at Neverland Ranch and a lunch with Barbara Bush at the White House. The event raised over $1,300,000.

As the demand for meals grew, The Center for Living formally changed its name to Project Angel Food and moved its offices to an old production office on Sunset Boulevard. In 1992, Elizabeth Taylor's AIDS Foundation gave Project Angel Food its first-ever grant of $150,000, and Project Angel Food obtained its first-ever government grant a year later. By 1994, over 100 individuals called for meal services each month and Project Angel Food moved into a new kitchen, funded by donations by Barry Diller, David Geffen, Barbra Streisand and Ron Burkle. Burkle agreed to underwrite rent costs on behalf of the Ralphs/Food-4-Less Foundation.

In 1999, Project Angel Food served its two millionth meal and registered its 20,000th volunteer. Elizabeth Taylor accepted an Angel Award recognizing her impact on increasing awareness of HIV/AIDS, where in Los Angeles by the end of 1999 there were over 30,000 known cases.

=== 2000–present ===
By the end of 2001, over 2.5 million meals had been served. Supporter Whoopi Goldberg was honored at the 2001 Angel Awards by Elizabeth Taylor. Over the next few years, as awareness of the program and the need for meals increased, Project Angel Food expanded their Mission Statement to include serving clients with other illnesses including cancer, diabetes, kidney failure, COPD, and others. The program also piloted a "Breakfast Program" to provide nutritionally sound breakfast meals to clients in need.

In 2006, Project Angel Food acquired a new building at 922 Vine Street in Hollywood, CA to serve as their permanent headquarters. A groundbreaking ceremony was held with Council President Eric Garcetti, Councilmember Tom LaBonge, Board Chair Merrily Newton among others. Philanthropist Wallis Annenberg presented a $500,000 leadership gift to the campaign, with other leading contributions from the Wells Fargo Foundation, the Keck Foundation, the MAC AIDS Fund, and the Ahmanson Foundation. Mayor Antonio Villaraigosa hosted a ribbon-cutting ceremony on November 15, 2007, marking the official opening of the new building and the delivery of the 5 millionth meal.

In 2008, the Project Angel Food kitchen received a perfect 100% score from the Los Angeles County Department of Health. Margaret Steele took over the helm from long-time chair John Gile as the new CEO of Project Angel Food. Project Angel Food's expanded mission to serve various life-threatening illnesses led to an expansion of territories throughout the greater Los Angeles community.

In 2010, the Project Angel Food Garden initiative was launched for staff and volunteers to cultivate and harvest fresh, organic vegetables and fruits to be used in meals, making use of community gardens and unused vacant plots donated by landowners. A few months later, in 2011, Congressman Xavier Becerra (CA-31) toured the kitchen.

In 2012, Project Angel Food served its 8 millionth meal and partnered up with skincare and cosmetics brand Kiehl's to generate additional fundraising revenue through sales of Kiehl's merchandise in their brick and mortar storefronts. Additional fundraising revenue has come from Feed Beads, bracelets made by volunteers and sold at events, and Do Good Cookies, cookies baked in the Project Angel Food kitchens and sold at four Pavilions Supermarkets in Los Angeles, California and Pasadena, California. Project Angel Food was under the leadership of Executive Director Laurie Lang from 2013 to 2015. In November 2015, Richard Ayoub became the fourth executive director of the organization. In 2021, Ayoub was promoted to CEO of the organization.

The organization attracted headlines when it was reported that, early into the COVID-19 pandemic in the United States, the Duke and Duchess of Sussex (Harry and Meghan), were volunteering with them by personally delivering food to people's homes. It was reported that the Duchess' mother, Doria Ragland, had referred them to the organization.

In April 2023, Los Angeles Mayor Karen Bass joined with Project Angel Food to deliver their 16 millionth free meal.

== Financial landscape and client demographics ==
As of 2015, Project Angel Food is approximately 87% funded via donor support, corporate and foundation grants and private bequests, with the other approximate 13% funded via government funding and federal grants. As of 2014, the program was estimated to cost almost $4 million per year to run. The Project partnered with Community Gardens to cut the cost of fresh fruit and vegetables after their revenue dropped from approximately $5.6 million in 2008 to $4.3 million in 2010. The Community Gardens partnership has continued into 2015 and has produced more than 3,500 pounds of produce since its inception.

== Fundraising and community interaction ==
Project Angel Food has been running a marquee fundraiser, the Angel Awards, since 1995. The Angel Awards is the programs' largest annual fundraiser, reportedly netting over $515,000 at the 2014 gala. The 2014 dinner, hosted by Sharon Stone, featured the presentation of the inaugural Elizabeth Taylor Leadership Award to philanthropist Aileen Getty.

Project Angel Food has also fundraised through their Bowling For Angels annual fundraiser, in its 20th year in 2015. The program has raised over $40,000 in 2015 and over $300,000 since the fundraisers' inception.

The agency provided assistance in the production of Paul Lekakis' film Don't tell, Don't ask by recruiting activists Bruce Vilanch, Harvey Fierstein and Whoopi Goldberg to provide commentaries.
