= Austin Channing Brown =

American author and social activist

Austin Channing Brown (born October 6, 1984) is an American writer and public speaker. She is executive producer of the web series The Next Question and the author of I'm Still Here: Black Dignity in a World Made for Whiteness (2018), which became a New York Times bestseller following the murder of George Floyd and subsequent protests. Her work is focused on sharing and platforming black women experiences in contemporary America. She continues to hold a daytime job working as Resident Director and Multicultural Liaison for Calvin College, where she manages student resident halls.

== Early life and education ==
Brown was given the name 'Austin' after her grandmother's maiden name, because her parents thought that it would improve her chances of employment later in life, if on paper she had a name that sounded like one of a white man. At the age of ten, Brown's parents separated, and she lived with her father but spent summers with her mother in Cleveland, Ohio, who lived in a primarily black neighbourhood.

She attended a predominately white elementary school, where she said she felt "erased" and "discounted". She then attended a Catholic high school. She went on to attend North Park University, a Christian university, and gained a Bachelor of Arts in business management. She later gained a Master of Arts in social justice from Marygrove College, a Catholic university.

== Social activism ==
Brown has frequently delivered speeches and lectures at universities, churches, and festivals across the US on issues of racism and social justice. She has previously worked for non-profit organizations tackling systemic issues of American social life such as homelessness and youth engagement.

== Awards ==
In December 2024 Oakland University awarded Brown a Doctor of Humane Letters Honoris Causa.

== Publications ==
- I'm Still Here: Black Dignity in a World Made for Whiteness (2018)
- Full of Myself: Notes on Black Womanhood (2025)
