= I'm Still Here (book) =

2018 memoir by Austin Channing Brown

- First edition
- Author: Austin Channing Brown
- Subject: Memoir
- Publisher: Convergent Books
- Publication date: May 2018
- Pages: 192
- ISBN: 9781524760854

I'm Still Here: Black Dignity in a World Made for Whiteness is a 2018 memoir by Austin Channing Brown. The book became a bestseller during the mid-2020 resurgence of national interest in racial injustice following the George Floyd protests.
