= Oilcan Harry's =

Gay bar in Austin, Texas, U.S.

- Logo
- Interactive map of Oilcan Harry's
- Address: Austin, Texas; U.S.
- Coordinates: 30°15′59.5″N 97°44′43.5″W
- Type: LGBTQ bar

Construction
- Opened: 1990

Website
- oilcanharrys.com

Oilcan Harry's is the oldest operating LGBTQ+ bar in Austin, Texas, United States.

== Description ==
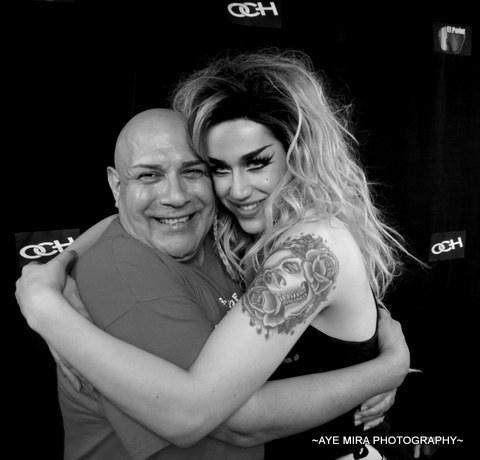
Adore Delano at Oilcan Harry's, 2014

In his 2022 overview of Austin's drag scene, Thrillist's James Wong said Oilcan Harry's "has a stellar lineup of drag shows every night of the week, and they couldn’t be more diverse. Alternating Wednesdays at 9 pm see Latina Tatiana Cholula spicing up our lives with Divina, and the drag kings Boiz of Austin showing the lads how its done, while Saturday’s Best Drag Show Ever is the ultimate party of queens competing for the title of Oilcan Harry’s Next Top Drag Model Supreme."

== History ==
The gay bar opened in 1990. The business halted operations temporarily in 2018.

== Reception ==
In 2021, James Wong of Thrillist said, "Austin’s oldest gay bar is by no means over the hill. Oilcan Harry’s throws a party every night of the week, whether it’s karaoke, drag king or queen shows, friendly competitions, bingo, or something totally off the wall. A huge hit with students and a fun-loving mixed crowd, this is a great place to make new friends in town."

== See also ==
- LGBT culture in Austin, Texas
