= Bill Presnal =

American politician

Member of the Texas House of Representatives from the 14th district
- In office January 11, 1983 – January 14, 1984
- Preceded by: Elton Bomer
- Succeeded by: Neeley C. Lewis

Member of the Texas House of Representatives from the 28th district
- In office January 9, 1973 – January 11, 1983
- Preceded by: Charles Jungmichel
- Succeeded by: Mark R. Davis

Member of the Texas House of Representatives from the 18th district
- In office January 14, 1969 – January 9, 1973
- Preceded by: David Graves Haines
- Succeeded by: Jimmie C. Edwards III

Personal details
- Born: April 26, 1932 Bryan, Texas
- Died: February 10, 2023 (aged 90) Bryan, Texas
- Party: Democratic

Bill Presnal (April 26, 1932 – February 10, 2023) was an American politician who served in the Texas House of Representatives from 1969 to 1984.

He died on February 10, 2023, in Bryan, Texas at age 90.
