= Steve Hicks School of Social Work =

Division of the University of Texas at Austin

School of Social Work
- Former names: Graduate School of Social Work; Steve Hicks School of Social Work
- Type: Public
- Established: 1950
- Parent institution: University of Texas at Austin
- Accreditation: Council on Social Work Education
- Dean: Allan Cole
- Location: Austin, Texas, United States
- Campus: Urban
- Website: socialwork.utexas.edu

The University of Texas at Austin School of Social Work is the school of social work for University of Texas at Austin. The School of Social Work has been Accredited by the Council on Social Work Education (CSWE) since 1950 and offers Bachelor of Social Work (BSW) and Master of Science in Social Work (MSSW) degree programs.

In 2017, after a donation of $25 million by telecommunications pioneer R. Steven "Steve" Hicks, the school was renamed to the Steve Hicks School of Social Work. The school was renamed to the University of Texas at Austin School of Social Work in July of 2025. The school was headquartered in UT's School of Social Work Building (formerly the University Junior High School).

== Building Demolition ==
In October 2024, demolition of the School of Social Work building began to build a new $70 million dollar football training facility.

The building was of historical significance, as it was previously the University Junior High School, the first fully integrated public middle school in Austin, TX. Attempts were made by the Save the Past for the fUTure coalition to save the building prior to destruction. However, these attempts were unsuccessful despite the building receiving a State Antiques Landmark (SAL) designation in July of 2024. The building was also surrounded by several large, aged, live oak trees which were included in the demolishment.

In the demolition approval from Texas Historical Commission, the University of Texas-Austin agreed to follow certain guidelines including the salvaging of some architectural features and creating a documentary film about the building. No information about the documentary plans, progress, or release date were stated.

The School of Social Work was temporarily relocated to Walter Webb Hall with plans of a permanent relocation in the current McCombs School of Business Building. The McCombs School of Business will be relocating to a new Mulva Hall when construction of that project is complete, expected in August of 2028.

== Research ==
Research projects at the UT School of Social Work are administered through The Center for Social Work Research (CSWR). The Center was founded in 1974 and houses 9 research institutes.

=== Addiction Research Institute ===
This institute focuses on substance abuse among underserved populations, particularly African-Americans and Mexican-Americans. The program adopts a uniquely social work perspective, emphasizing factors at the individual, family, organizational, societal, and cultural level that influence substance abuse and substance abuse treatment.

=== Health Behavior and Research Training Institute ===
This institute specializes in the development and implementation of interventions to address health behaviors and in the training and supervision of providers in the field who address behavior change on the front lines. Our theoretical framework is based on the Transtheoretical Model (TTM) and Motivational Interviewing (MI). Through funding primarily from the National Institutes of Health (NIH) and the Centers for Disease Control and Prevention (CDC), HBRT's intervention research focuses on fetal alcohol spectrum disorder; alcohol, cocaine, smoking, and other substance disorders; STI testing; HIV and safer sexual practices; and screening and brief motivational interventions in medical settings.

== Rankings and Reputation ==
The University of Texas at Austin Master of Science in Social Work (MSSW) program has been consistently ranked among the top ten programs in the nation since 2003. In 2019, US News ranked the MSSW program number 8 out of the top 12 Master of Social Work Programs and in 2024, it was tied for 8th out of 319 graduate social work programs in the United States.

== Donation and Renaming ==
In 2017, the School of Social Work received a large donation from telecommunications pioneer and vice chairman of the Board of Regents at the University of Texas System, R. Steven "Steve" Hicks. The announcement of this donation was made September 6, 2017, and in commemoration of the event, the university tower was lit burnt orange. The $25 million donation is to be split three ways, with $10 million going towards establishing a permanent endowment to support future scholarships, $5 million being used to match donations in an effort to encourage additional gifts, and $10 million being used to fund and enhance various aspects of the education system. Hicks, who is a business man himself with no personal background in social work, stated he made the donation in an effort "to reduce student debt burden so that social work graduates can stay in their careers doing what they love and positively affecting the lives of thousands of people."

== See also ==
- List of social work schools
