= David Kessler (writer) =

American author and thanatologist (born 1959)

- Born: February 16, 1959 (age 67); Rhode Island, U.S.
- Education: Loyola Marymount University
- Occupations: Author, thanatologist

David Kessler (born February 16, 1959) is an American author, public speaker, and death and grieving expert.

He has published many books, including two co-written with psychiatrist Elisabeth Kübler-Ross: Life Lessons: Two Experts on Death and Dying Teach Us About the Mysteries of Life and Living; and On Grief & Grieving: Finding the Meaning of Grief Through the Five Stages of Grief.

His first book, The Needs of the Dying, received praise from Mother Teresa and Marianne Williamson.

== Biography ==
Kessler was born in Rhode Island. He did his undergraduate work at USC and graduate work at Loyola Marymount University in bioethics. His mother died in 1973 when he was 13. Around the time of her death in the intensive care unit, Kessler and his dad were staying at a Howard Johnson's hotel in New Orleans when the hotel became the site of the 13 hour-long mass shooting perpetrated by the "New Orleans Sniper", Mark Essex.

During the HIV/AIDS crisis, he founded Progressive Nursing Services, and he also later co-founded Project Angel Food with Marianne Williamson in 1989.

As a modern-day thanatologist, he follows death wherever it may occur. Therefore, his work combines several occupations, including working with the dying in hospitals and hospices, volunteering as a reserve officer on the police trauma team, and participating with the Red Cross on aviation disasters and its disaster team.

== Career ==
Kessler concentrates in hospice, palliative care, grief and loss. His latest work includes interviews about afterlife, near death studies and near death awareness. He also is chairperson for the Hospital Association of Southern California Palliative Care Committee. His experiences have taken him from Auschwitz concentration camp to Mother Teresa's Home for the Dying Destitute in Calcutta. He also worked with Anthony Perkins, Michael Landon and industrialist Armand Hammer when they faced their own deaths.

He is the founder of the website grief.com which has over five million visits yearly from 167 countries.

== Relationship with Elisabeth Kübler-Ross ==
Elisabeth Kübler-Ross, M.D., was a psychiatrist and the author of the book On Death and Dying. She was one of the world's foremost authorities on the psychology of dying and is credited with changing attitudes towards the terminally ill. In 1995 she suffered a series of major strokes, which left her paralyzed and facing her own death. It was during this time that she and David Kessler wrote their first book together, Life Lessons: Two Experts on Death and Dying Teach Us About the Mysteries of Life and Living.

Kübler-Ross died in 2004. Her last book, co-written with David Kessler, On Grief and Grieving, was completed one month before her death. David Kessler worked closely with Elisabeth for ten years and was with her as she was dying. He feels it is part of his mission to keep her work alive for the next generation.

In 2016, after his son David Kessler Jr. died from an accidental drug overdose amid the opioid crisis, Kessler received permission from Kübler-Ross's family and the Elisabeth Kübler-Ross Foundation, which her son Ken Ross founded, to write Finding Meaning: The Sixth Stage of Grief, where he wrote about a sixth stage of grief, finding meaning.

== Personal life ==
Kessler has a partner. In 2000, he adopted two sons, Richard and David, the latter of whom died from an accidental drug overdose in 2016.

He is a godfather to Marianne Williamson's daughter India Emmaline, and Williamson is in turn a godmother to both of his sons.

== Bibliography ==
- Finding Meaning: The Sixth Stage of Grief (Scribner 2019)
- Visions, Trips, and Crowded Rooms: Who and What You See Before You Die (Hay House 2010)
- With Elisabeth Kübler Ross, On Grief & Grieving: Finding the Meaning of Grief through the Five Stages of Loss (Simon & Schuster 2005)
- Life Lessons: Two Experts on Death and Dying Teach us about the Mysteries of Life and Living (Simon & Schuster 2001)
- The Needs of the Dying: A Guide for Bringing Hope, Comfort, and Love to Life’s Final Chapter (HarperCollins 1997 and 2007)
