= Shankar Vedantam =

American journalist, writer, and science correspondent

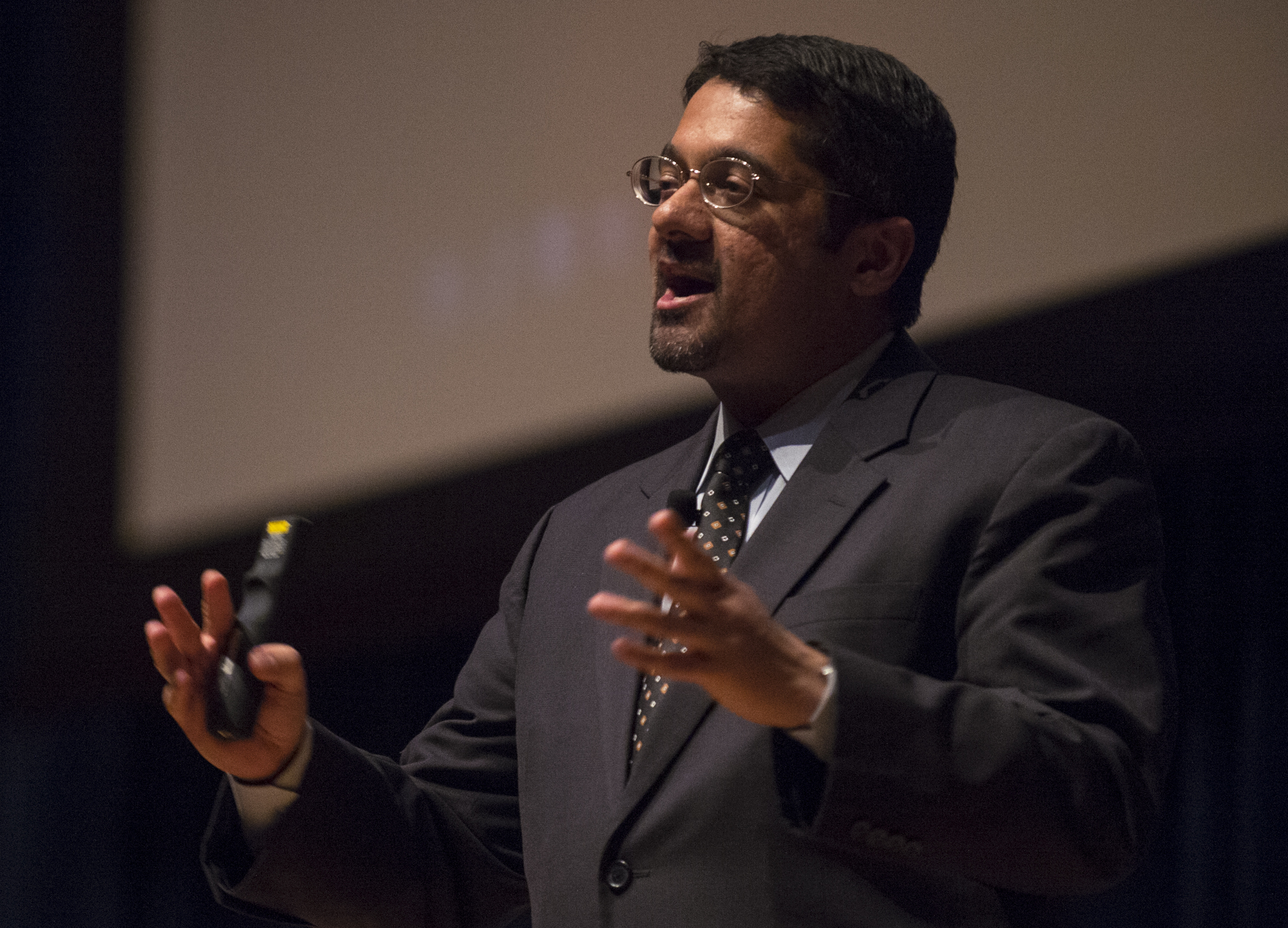
- Vedantam in 2016
- Education: Stanford University
- Occupation: Journalist

Shankar Vedantam is an American journalist, writer, and science correspondent. His reporting focuses on human behavior and the social sciences. He is best known for his Hidden Brain family of products: book, podcast, and radio program.

== Education ==
Vedantam earned an undergraduate degree in electronics engineering in India, and a master's degree in journalism at Stanford University in the United States.

== Journalistic career ==
Vedantam was a participant in the 2002–2003 Rosalynn Carter Mental Health Journalism Fellowship, the 2003–2004 World Health Organization Journalism Fellowship, and the 2005 Templeton-Cambridge Fellowship on Science and Religion. He was a 2009–2010 Nieman Fellow. He worked at The Washington Post from 2001 to 2011, writing its "Department of Human Behavior" column from 2007 to 2009. He then wrote an occasional column called "Hidden Brain" for Slate. Vedantam published The Ghosts of Kashmir in 2005, a collection of short stories discussing the divide between Indians and Pakistani.

In 2010, Vedantam published the book entitled The Hidden Brain. The Edward R. Murrow Award winner focuses on how people become influenced by their unconscious biases. The book incorporates his experiences working as a reporter at the Washington Post. This nonfiction book showcases a range of real life examples on how their biases affect their mental health, including nine chapters discussing situations that affect unconscious biases.

Vedantam hosts the social sciences podcast also called Hidden Brain, where he "reveals the unconscious patterns that drive human behavior, the biases that shape our choices, and the triggers that direct the course of our relationships." The podcast has engaged more than two million downloads per week and has aired on 250 radio stations across the United States. The podcast began at NPR, which he had joined in 2011 and where it remained until October 2020, when it became independent. It is currently produced by Hidden Brain Media. The radio program of the same name, which started in 2017, continues on NPR.

He has lectured at Harvard University and Columbia University, served on the advisory board of the Templeton-Cambridge Fellowships in Science & Religion, and been a senior scholar at the Woodrow Wilson International Center for Scholars in Washington.

== Literary career ==
Vedantam has written plays, fiction, and nonfiction. His comedy Tom, Dick and Harriet was produced by the Brick Playhouse in Philadelphia in 2004, and his collection of short stories, The Ghosts of Kashmir, was published in 2005. His first nonfiction book, The Hidden Brain: How Our Unconscious Minds Elect Presidents, Control Markets, Wage Wars and Save Our Lives, was published in 2010. His second nonfiction book (co-written with Bill Mesler), Useful Delusions: The Power and Paradox of the Self-Deceiving Brain, was published in 2021.

== Works ==
- The Ghosts of Kashmir. New Delhi: Tara Press. 2005. ISBN 978-8187943792. OCLC 66394142.
- The Hidden Brain: How Our Unconscious Minds Elect Presidents, Control Markets, Wage Wars, and Save Our Lives. New York: Spiegel & Grau. 2010. ISBN 978-1-58836-939-0. OCLC 290472076.
- Useful Delusions: The Power and Paradox of the Self-Deceiving Brain. New York: Norton. 2021. ISBN 978-1-324-02028-8.
