= Texas's 51st House of Representatives district =

American legislative district

Texas's 51st State House of Representatives district
Representative
Lulu Flores; D–Austin
- Demographics: 30.5% White; 9.5% Black; 55.2% Hispanic; 4.4% Asian
- Population (2020) • Voting age: 203,508; 160,986

The 51st district of the Texas House of Representatives represents a southeast portion of the city of Austin, the capital of Texas, in Travis County. The current representative is Lulu Flores, who has represented the district since 2023.

Major highway I-35 goes through the northwest portion of the district.
