= Outline of parapsychology =

Overview of and topical guide to parapsychology

Parapsychology is a field of research that studies a number of ostensible paranormal phenomena, including telepathy, precognition, clairvoyance, psychokinesis, near-death experiences, reincarnation, and apparitional experiences.

== Essence of parapsychology ==
- Fringe science
- Paranormal
- Pseudoscience
- Psionics
- Psychic
- Psychology

== General concepts ==
- Abacomancy
- Altered state of consciousness
- Apparitional experience
- Astral body
- Aura (paranormal)
- Clairaudience
- Clairsentience
- Clairvoyance
- Cold reading
- Dowsing
- Ectoplasm (paranormal)
- Exorcist
- Extrasensory perception (ESP)
- Ganzfeld experiment
- Ghosts
- Global Consciousness Project
- Haunted house
- History of parapsychology
- Hot reading
- Hypnosis
- IANDS
- Journal of Parapsychology
- List of psychic abilities
- Materialization (parapsychology)
- Medical intuitive
- Mediumship
- Mental Radio
- Metaphysical levitation
- Mind–body interventions
- Morphic field
- National Laboratory of Psychical Research
- Near-death experience
- Near-death studies
- Out-of-body experiences
- Paranormal
- Parapsychological Association
- Parapsychology
- Past life regression
- Pauli effect
- Poltergeist
- Precognition
- Prescience
- Project Alpha
- Psychic
- Psychic reading
- Psychokinesis
- Psychometry
- Pyrokinesis
- Radiesthesia
- Reincarnation research
- Remote viewing
- Research results in parapsychology
- Retrocognition
- Rhine Research Center
- Stargate Project
- Synchronicity
- Telepathy
- Therapeutic touch
- Transliminality
- Transpersonal experience
- Unexplained Mysteries
- Veridical dream
- Zener card

== Organizations ==
- American Society for Psychical Research
- International Association for Near-Death Studies
- National Laboratory of Psychical Research
- Parapsychological Association
- Princeton Engineering Anomalies Research Lab
- Society for Psychical Research

== Parapsychologists ==
- Óscar González-Quevedo
- Loyd Auerbach
- Daryl Bem
- Hans Bender
- Stephen E. Braude
- Whately Carington
- Hereward Carrington
- Michael Daniels
- Théodore Flournoy
- Nandor Fodor
- Bruce Greyson
- László Harasztosi
- Hans Holzer
- Charles Honorton
- Thomson Jay Hudson
- James H. Hyslop
- Alexander Imich
- Lawrence LeShan
- Rufus Osgood Mason
- James Hewat McKenzie
- Michel Moine
- Thelma Moss
- Gardner Murphy
- Ciarán O'Keeffe
- Frank Podmore
- Joseph Gaither Pratt
- Harold E. Puthoff
- Dean Radin
- Konstantīns Raudive
- Carl Reichenbach
- Joseph Banks Rhine
- Kenneth Ring
- D. Scott Rogo
- William G. Roll
- Henry Sidgwick
- Ian Stevenson
- Charles Tart
- Rudolf Tischner
- Jim B. Tucker
- René Warcollier

== Publications ==
- Extrasensory Perception
- Irreducible Mind: Toward a Psychology for the 21st Century
- Journal of Consciousness Studies
- Journal of Near-Death Studies
- Journal of Parapsychology
- Journal of Scientific Exploration
- Life After Life: The Investigation of a Phenomenon—Survival of Bodily Death
- Life Before Life: A Scientific Investigation of Children's Memories of Previous Lives
- Old Souls: The Scientific Evidence For Past Lives
- Parapsychology: Frontier Science of the Mind
- The Roots of Coincidence
- Twenty Cases Suggestive of Reincarnation

== See also ==
- Paranormal
- Psychology
