= Twenty Cases Suggestive of Reincarnation =

1966 book by Ian Stevenson

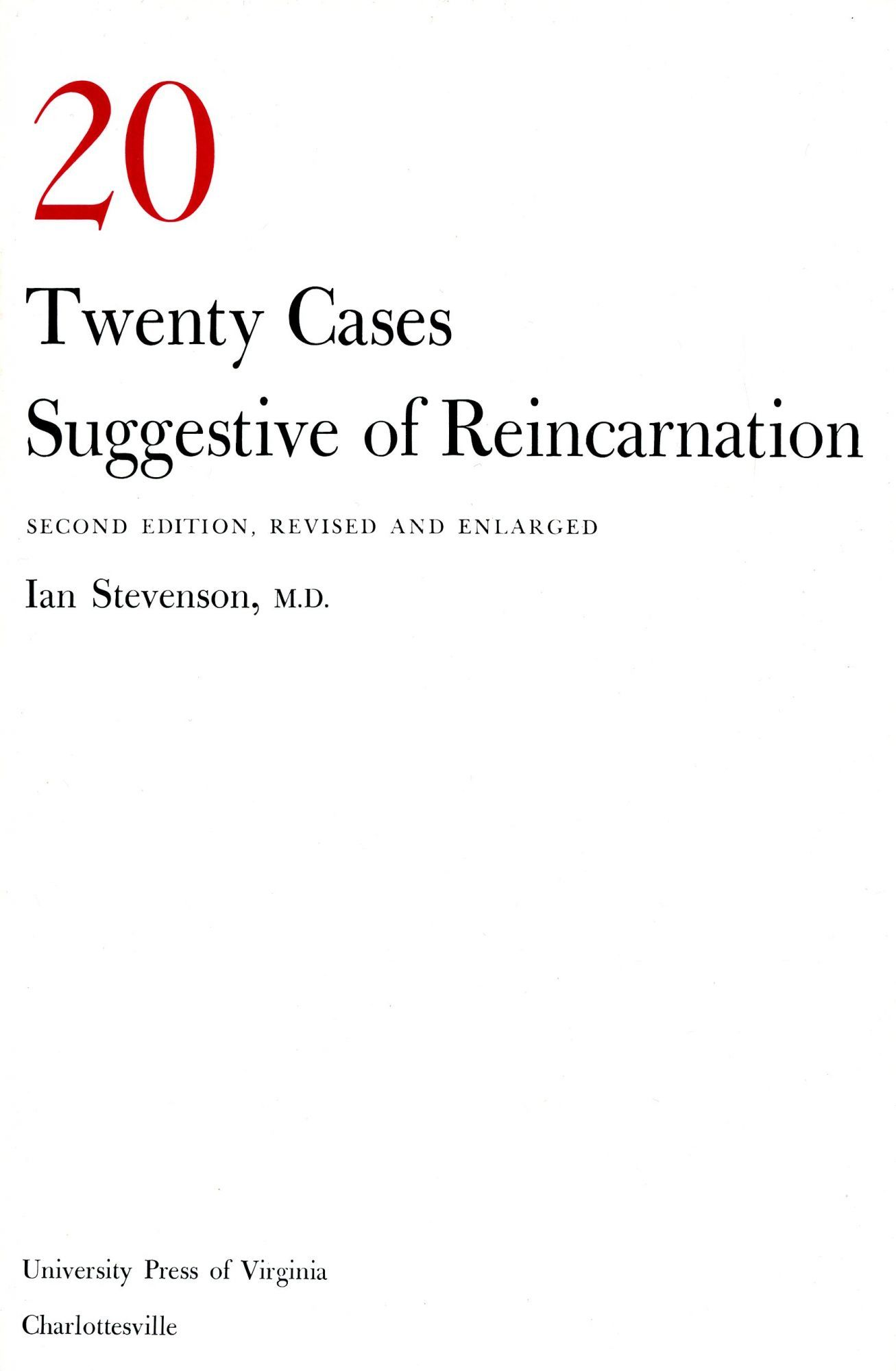
- Twenty Cases Suggestive of Reincarnation
- Author: Ian Stevenson
- Language: English
- Subject: Reincarnation research
- Publisher: University Press of Virginia
- Publication date: 1966 (1st. ed.); 1974 (2nd. ed.)
- Pages: 396
- ISBN: 0-8139-0872-8
- OCLC: 7810141

Twenty Cases Suggestive of Reincarnation is a 1966 book written by psychiatrist Ian Stevenson on claims of spontaneous recall of information about previous lives by young children. The book focuses on twenty cases investigated by the author. It has been translated into seven foreign languages.

== General approach ==
Stevenson describes his general approach as following an "almost conventional pattern":

The case usually starts when a small child of two to four years of age begins talking to their parents or siblings of a life they led in another time and place. The child usually feels a considerable pull back toward the events of the life and he frequently importunes his parents to let them return to the community where they claim that they formerly lived. If the child makes enough particular statements about the previous life, the parents (usually reluctantly) begin inquiries about their accuracy. Often, indeed usually, such attempts at verification do not occur until several years after the child has begun to speak of the previous life. If some verification results, members of the two families visit each other and ask the child whether they recognizes places, objects, and people of their supposed previous existence.

Stevenson set up a network of volunteers to find these spontaneous past life recall cases as soon as the children began to speak of them. He then would carefully question both the family of the living child and the family of the deceased to ensure that they had no contact and that no information would be passed between them. He would obtain detailed information about the deceased, including information not fully known to anyone involved, such as details of the will, that he would use to verify that the child actually did know the information required.

The publication of the book was delayed when it was discovered that one of Stevenson's interpreters had been accused of dishonesty. Stevenson claimed that the translator was dishonest in some matters, but "did not think the man had deceived him". Nevertheless, he returned to India, where the interpreter had been used, and examined the cases in question again, with different interpreters. He found them to be even stronger evidence for reincarnation than he had previously thought.

== Published results ==
Stevenson concluded that reincarnation was the "best possible explanation" for the following reasons:

- The large number of witnesses and the lack of apparent motivation and opportunity, due to the vetting process, make the hypothesis of fraud extremely unlikely.
- The large amount of information possessed by the child is not generally consistent with the hypothesis that the child obtained that information through investigated contact between the families.
- Demonstration of similar personality characteristics and skills not learned in the current life and the lack of motivation for the long length of identification with a past life make the hypothesis of the child gaining his recollections and behavior through extra-sensory perception improbable.
- When there is correlation between congenital deformities or birthmarks possessed by the child and the history of the previous individual, the hypothesis of random occurrence is improbable.

== Reception ==
In 1977, the Journal of Nervous and Mental Disease devoted most of one issue to Stevenson's work in which psychiatrist Harold Lief described Stevenson as "a methodical, careful, even cautious, investigator, whose personality is on the obsessive side...Either he is making a colossal mistake, or he will be known ... as 'the Galileo of the 20th century.'" When philosopher Leonard Angel criticized one of the cases in Twenty Cases Suggestive of Reincarnation personally handled by Stevenson, Stevenson published a rebuttal which argued the critique itself was flawed. Mainstream scientists tended to ignore or dismiss Stevenson's research. Some questioned his objectivity, claimed he was credulous and suggested his investigations were flawed.

== Reviews ==
Reviews of Twenty Cases Suggestive of Reincarnation have been published in the American Journal of Psychiatry, British Journal of Psychiatry, British Journal of Medical Psychology, Journal of Nervous and Mental Disease and some other journals.

== See also ==
- European Cases of the Reincarnation Type
- Where Reincarnation and Biology Intersect
- Old Souls (book)
- Carol Bowman
- Reincarnation in popular culture

== Bibliography ==
- Stevenson, Ian (1974). Twenty cases suggestive of reincarnation second (revised and enlarged) edition, University of Virginia Press. ISBN 978-0-8139-0872-4
- Stevenson, Ian (1997). Reincarnation and Biology: A Contribution to the Etiology of Birthmarks and Birth Defects Volume 1: Birthmarks and Reincarnation and Biology: A Contribution to the Etiology of Birthmarks and Birth Defects Volume 2: Birth Defects and Other Anomalies. Praeger Publishers, Westport, Connecticut, and London. ISBN 0-275-95282-7
- Tucker, Jim B. (2005). Life Before Life: A scientific Investigation of Children's Memories of Previous Lives, St. Martin's Press, New York, 256pp. ISBN 0-312-32137-6
