= Journey of Souls =

Journey of Souls may refer to:

- Journey of Souls (album), a 2008 album by Norwegian symphonic power metal band Keldian
- Journey of Souls (book), a book on regression by Michael Newton
