= Reincarnation and Biology =

1997 monograph by Ian Stevenson

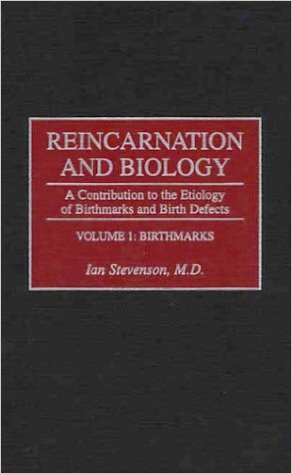
- Cover of Volume 1: Birthmarks
- Author: Ian Stevenson
- Subject: Reincarnation
- Publisher: Praeger Publishers
- Publication date: 1997
- Pages: 2268 pp.
- ISBN: 978-0-275-95282-2

Reincarnation and Biology: A Contribution to the Etiology of Birthmarks and Birth Defects is a 1997 two-part monograph (2268 pages) written by psychiatrist Ian Stevenson and published by Praeger. Where Reincarnation and Biology Intersect is a condensation of the two books written for the general reader.

Reincarnation and Biology has been reviewed in Omega 36(3):273-274, 1997–98, and in the Journal of the American Society for Psychical Research 92:286-291, 1999. Joint reviews of Where Reincarnation and Biology Intersect and Reincarnation and Biology have also appeared in several journals.

== See also ==
- Life Before Life: A Scientific Investigation of Children's Memories of Previous Lives
- Old Souls: The Scientific Evidence For Past Lives
- European Cases of the Reincarnation Type
