= Godwin Samararatne =

Godwin Samararatna
- Born: 6 September 1932; Kandy, British Ceylon
- Died: 22 March 2000 (aged 67); Peradeniya, Kandy, Sri Lanka
- Education: Dharmaraja College, Kandy
- Known for: Buddhist Meditation
- Website: Official Website

Acharya Godwin Samararatne (6 September 1932 – 22 March 2000) was one of the best known lay meditation teachers in Sri Lanka in recent times. During his teaching career he was based at his Meditation Centre at Nilambe in the central hill country near Kandy. After his death in March 2000 letters and tributes poured in as many people around the world attested to the impact that Godwin and his teaching had made on their lives.

== Life and teaching ==
Godwin Samararatne was born on 6 September 1932 in Kandy, Sri Lanka. His father was the chief clerk of a tea estate at Hantane in the hills above Kandy and his mother was a simple up-country housewife. He had three brothers and four sisters. A younger sister died prematurely and an older brother died in a car accident on the day of his wedding. His three surviving sisters were Dorothy, Matilde and Lakshmi. Godwin was the youngest of the two surviving brothers, Felix and Hector.

Godwin attended the Dharmaraja College in Kandy, where his best friend was Siri Gunawardana who later ordained as Venerable Sivali and became a well-known and respected meditation teacher at the Kanduboda International Vipassana Meditation Center. He was an able student and after finishing his education got a job at the Kegalle Public Library in 1956. Later Godwin became Chief Librarian in the D.S. Senanayaka Library in Kandy where he worked until his early retirement in 1979.

Godwin was an active collaborator with the reincarnation researcher Ian Stevenson, and worked with him whenever he visited Sri Lanka from the mid-1960s until Stevenson ended his research in the country in 1988 During that time he co-authored a number of articles with Stevenson on the subject on rebirth and he also visited Stevenson in Virginia, United States in 1977 to help with his studies.

In about 1977 Godwin started helping Dr. L. Rodrigo who worked in the Psychiatric Ward of the Kandy General Hospital. This was the beginning of a long career in counselling and therapeutic work that Godwin was to undertake at various centres, clinics and hospitals around the Kandy area., and that continued until his death.

In early 1979 a prosperous Kandy businessman, Mr. Alahakoon announced that he would donate some land from his tea-estate for the establishment of a meditation centre and pay for the construction of some buildings. This became the foundation of the Nilambe Meditation Centre. Godwin left his job as Librarian in Kandy, at first to be the caretaker at the new Center but later he became the resident teacher.

At the beginning meditation retreats were mainly conducted by Ven S. Dhammika, and others including Ven. Yogavacara Rahula and Joseph Goldstein; but over time Godwin became the resident teacher at the centre, and became accepted as the Centre's main teacher.

During the 1980s Godwin started receiving and accepting invitations for teaching tours that were being organised for him in Switzerland, Germany, U.K., South Africa, Zimbabwe and Botswana; and later in Hong Kong, Taiwan and Singapore.

This touring only increased during the 1990s, and Godwin gave many teachings throughout Europe, Asia and Africa right until the time of his death shortly after returning from a tour of South Africa. He taught meditation not only to Theravada Buddhists but to all sorts of groups, including Christian priests and pastors, and Chinese Mahayana Buddhists.

The personal testimonies that poured in after his death and in publications since then attest to the profound influence Godwin had on people from all walks of life; and the centres he set up in Nilambe and Lewella in Sri Lanka are still flourishing till this day.

After he died two of his friends started collecting transcripts and recordings from all over the world, and this material now makes up a large website, which has formed the basis for numerous books, articles and other publications over the years.

== Literature ==
=== Buddhist teachings ===
- Godwin Samararatne: Talks on Buddhist Meditation. Buddhist Publication Society, Kandy 2002, ISBN 955-24-0233-0.
- Godwin Samararatne: Living With Awareness edited by Jeanne Mynett, Nilambe Buddhist Meditation Center Trust Board, Kandy, 2006
- Godwin Samararatne: Lebendig durch Achtsamkeit. Anleitungen zur Meditationspraxis. Waldhaus Verlag, Nickenich 2005, ISBN 3-937660-00-3.
- Godwin Samararatne: Meditation for Everyday Life. Buddhist Cultural Centre, Colombo 2006.
- Godwin Samararatne: Seeing Emptiness. In: Sumana Ratanayaka (ed.): Buddhist Studies in Honour of Venerable Kirindigalle Dhammaratana. Vidumina Pirivena, Pujapitiya (Sri Lanka), 2007, S. 191-198.
- Godwin Samararatne: Life is our Best Teacher (Chinese translation of Godwin's 1997 Hong Kong talks) (date and place of publication unknown).
- Godwin Samararatne: Watching thoughts and emotions. In: Rod Bucknell and Chris Kang (eds.): The Meditative Way. Readings in the theory and practice of Buddhist meditation. Curzon Press, Richmond 1997, S. 136-145, ISBN 0-7007-0677-1. (This talk also published by Nilambe Meditation Centre in booklet form, 2007).
- Godwin Samararatne: The Gentle Way of Buddhist Meditation (Godwin's 1997 Hong Kong talks). Inward Path Publisher, Penang, 2007. ISBN 983-3512-31-3.
- Godwin Samararatne: Learning through Meditation, Retreat Talks in Holland in 1996 & 1998, transcribed and edited by Peter van Leeuwan, revised by Jeanne Mynett. Nilambe Buddhist Meditation Center Trust Board, Kandy, 2009).
- Godwin Samararatne: Discovering Meditation, retreat talks in the Waldhaus, Germany in 1996, 2nd edition edited by Jeanne Mynett and Esther Thien. Awaken Publications, Singapore, 2009.
- Godwin Samararatne: Discovering Meditation, in Sinhala, translated Asoka Padmini Bandara, Nilambe Buddhist Meditation Center Trust Board, Kandy, 2010
- Godwin Samararatne: Remembering Godwin, a selection of talks by Godwin Samararatne and some appreciations of his life and teachings, edited and compiled by Dennis Candy and Sampath Dissanayake. Nilambe Buddhist Meditation Trust Board, Kandy, 2010.

=== Reincarnation research ===
- Emily Williams Cook, Satwant Pasricha, Godwin Samararatne, U Win Maung, Ian Stevenson: Review and analysis of "unsolved" cases of the reincarnation type. I. Introduction and illustrative case reports. In: Journal of the American Society for Psychical Research. 77 (1983), S. 45-62. ISSN 0003-1070
- Emily Williams Cook, Satwant Pasricha, Godwin Samararatne, U Win Maung, Ian Stevenson: Review and analysis of "unsolved" cases of the reincarnation type. II. Comparison of features of solved and unsolved cases. In: Journal of the American Society for Psychical Research. 77 (1983), S. 115-135. ISSN 0003-1070
- Ian Stevenson, Godwin Samararatne: Three new cases of the reincarnation type in Sri Lanka with written records made before verification. In: Journal of Nervous and Mental Disease. 176 (1988), S. 741. ISSN 0022-3018
- Ian Stevenson, Godwin Samararatne. Three new cases of the reincarnation type in Sri Lanka with written records made before verification. In: Journal of Scientific Exploration. 2 (1988), S. 217-238. ISSN 0892-3310 (Abstract, Portuguese translation)
- Ian Stevenson, Satwant Pasricha, Godwin Samararatne: Deception and self-deception in cases of the reincarnation type. Seven illustrative cases in Asia. In: Journal of the American Society for Psychical Research. 82 (1988), S. 1-31. ISSN 0003-1070
- Erlendur Haraldsson, Godwin Samararatne: Children who speak of memories of a previous life as a Buddhist monk. Three new cases. In: Journal of the Society for Psychical Research. 63 (1999), S. 268-291. ISSN 0037-1475; PDF (1,8 MB)

=== Other ===
- Anne M. Blackburn, Jeffrey Samuels (eds.): Approaching the Dhamma: Essays on Buddhism in South and Southeast Asia. Pariyatti Publishing, 2003, ISBN 1-928706-19-3. (Book with buddhological essays in memory of G. S.)
