= Old Souls (book) =

1999 nonfiction book by Tom Shroder

Old Souls: The Scientific Search for Proof of Past Lives
- Author: Tom Shroder
- Cover artist: Julie Metz
- Language: English
- Genre: Investigative Journalism
- Publisher: Simon & Schuster
- Publication date: 1999
- Publication place: United States
- Media type: Print (Hardback)
- Pages: 256
- ISBN: 0-684-85192-X
- OCLC: 42273755
- Dewey Decimal: 133.9/01/35 21
- LC Class: BL515 .S46 1999

Old Souls: The Scientific Search for Proof of Past Lives is a non-fiction book by journalist Tom Shroder. An editor at The Washington Post, Shroder traveled extensively with psychiatrist Ian Stevenson of the University of Virginia, who conducted past life and reincarnation research in Lebanon, India and the American South. Shroder's journalistic experience makes this book a valuable review of an often disparaged subject.

Stevenson's informants were around 3000 children spontaneously remembering recent ordinary lives, as opposed to adults remembering under hypnosis romantic or heroic lives in the distant past. In addition, birthmarks that occur at the sites of injury in the previous life constitute an important part of Stevenson's evidence.

Stevenson's methodology involved listening to stories, comparing and contrasting variants of stories, verification or falsification of empirical claims, and constructing long, detailed narratives that attempt to "capture" the complex experience of his informants, who claim to remember incidents from past lives. In this sense Stevenson's work is similar to that of ethnographers and cultural anthropologists.

While Stevenson wrote extensively on his reincarnation studies, his work earned limited circulation outside academia. At the outset, Shroder sees his role not only as an observer, but also as skeptic. But as his journey with Stevenson progresses, Shroder finds it increasingly difficult to reject the possibility of past lives.

== Reception ==
Jack Coulehan, writing for the New York University of Medicine, said "This book provides a good introduction to the work of Ian Stevenson, a man who qualifies for this database because he has devoted his professional life to the study of narrative. Stevenson's methodology involves listening to stories, comparing and contrasting variants of stories, and constructing long, detailed narratives that attempt to 'capture' the complex experience of his informants, who claim to remember incidents from past lives. In this sense Stevenson's work is similar to that of ethnographers, cultural anthropologists, and folklorists".

David Wallis, writing for The New York Times, has said "After years of mockery from colleagues, Dr. Ian Stevenson, Director of the Department of Personality Studies at the University of Virginia, is finally getting respect".

More critically, the philosopher and skeptic Robert Todd Carroll wrote that "Old Souls is an interesting read but the author is not very critical in his observations. He takes a lot at face value and seems not to understand the dangers of confirmation bias."

Old Souls received considerable media attention following publication, in the Los Angeles Times, Chicago Tribune, and other sources.

== See also ==
- Jim B. Tucker
- Life Before Life
- Reincarnation research
- Children's Past Lives
- Twenty Cases Suggestive of Reincarnation
- European Cases of the Reincarnation Type
- Where Reincarnation and Biology Intersect
