= Edward Francis Kelly =

American neuroscientist and parapsychologist

Edward Francis Kelly is an American neuroscientist and parapsychologist. He is a research professor in the Division of Perceptual Studies at the University of Virginia School of Medicine.

Kelly's research interests include cognitive neuroscience and mind–body dualism, with a focus on phenomena (for example, from parapsychology and the paranormal) that challenge the current neuroscientific view of mind. Among his areas of focus are intensive neuroimaging studies of persons in various kinds of altered states of consciousness.

Kelly has published peer-reviewed works in which he argues for a break from the dominant physicalist view of human mind and nature and for a strong dualistic account that argues for post-mortem survival of consciousness, drawing upon evidence from psychical research such as mystical experience, near-death experience, and stigmata. He served as the lead author for the books Irreducible Mind (2007) and Beyond Physicalism (2015).

== Career ==
After completing his doctoral degree, Kelly spent more than 15 years working in the field of parapsychology, first at J. B. Rhine's Institute for Parapsychology in Durham, North Carolina, then (for ten years) through the Department of Electrical Engineering at Duke University, and finally through the Spring Creek Institute, a nonprofit research institute in Chapel Hill, North Carolina. During this time, he published various papers on experimental, methodological, and theoretical topics in parapsychology, as well as a book, Computer Recognition of English Word Senses (with P. J. Stone). From 1988 to 2002, he worked with a large neuroscience group at the University of North Carolina at Chapel Hill, conducting EEG and fMRI studies. In 2002, he once again took up full-time parapsychology research. By 2018, he had returned to his central, long-term research interest—the application of modern functional neuroimaging methods to detailed psychophysiological studies of altered states of consciousness and extrasensory perception. He served for several years as the co-director of the Westphal Neuroimaging Laboratory at the University of Virginia. In June 2024, Jim B. Tucker, director of the university's Division of Perceptual Studies, announced that in July, Kelly and his colleague Ross Dunseath would step down as co-directors of the laboratory, which they had been instrumental in founding, in favor of a successor, though they would continue to actively participate in the division's research.

== Publications ==
In 2007, Kelly, along with his wife, Emily Williams Kelly, and Adam Crabtree, Alan Gauld, Michael Grosso, and Bruce Greyson, published a book titled Irreducible Mind, in which they attempt to bridge contemporary cognitive psychology and mainstream neuroscience with "rogue phenomena"—which the authors argue exist in near-death experiences—psychophysiological influence, automatism, memory, genius, and mystical states. They argue for a dualist interpretation of the mind-brain relation, in which the brain only acts as a "filter" or "transmitter" of consciousness, which survives death of the body.

In 2015, Kelly, Crabtree, and Paul Marshall published a more theoretical sequel to Irreducible Mind, titled Beyond Physicalism, in which they seek to understand how the world must be constituted so that the empirical phenomena catalogued in Irreducible Mind would be possible.

Kelly and Marshall and colleagues published a third book in 2021, Consciousness Unbound, building on earlier works.
