= Antonia Mills =

Canadian anthropologist

- Occupation: Professor
- Awards: Shastri Indo-Canadian Institute Fellowship

Academic background
- Education: PhD (Harvard)
- Alma mater: Harvard University
- Influences: Ian Stevenson

Academic work
- Era: 21st Century
- Discipline: Anthropology
- Sub-discipline: First Nations studies
- Institutions: University of Northern British Columbia
- Main interests: Reincarnation research
- Notable works: Amerindian Rebirth: Reincarnation Belief Among North American Indians and Inuit (1994); Eagle Down is Our Law: Witsutit'en Feasts, Laws and Land Claims (1994); Hang On To These Words: Johnny David's Delgamuukw Testimony (2005)

Antonia (Tonia) Mills is a professor emeritus in First Nations studies at the University of Northern British Columbia, Canada. Her current research interests include First Nations land claims, religion and law, and reincarnation research. Mills met Ian Stevenson (professor and psychiatrist) in Vancouver in 1984 and was impressed with his reincarnation case studies. Since 1964, she has done field work with the Beaver Indians.

Mills co-edited Amerindian Rebirth: Reincarnation Belief Among North American Indians and Inuit (1994), and wrote Eagle Down is Our Law: Witsutit'en Feasts, Laws and Land Claims (1994). Preparation for Eagle Down involved three years living with the Witsuwit'en and serving as an expert witness and expert opinion writer for the Delgamuukw case. Her book, Hang On To These Words: Johnny David's Delgamuukw Testimony, was published in 2005. She has been awarded a Shastri Indo-Canadian Institute Fellowship for "A Longitudian Study of Young Adults who were said to Remember a Previous Life".

Mills teaches courses at undergraduate and graduate levels, including the subject "Indigenous Perspectives on Reincarnation and Rebirth". She has also published in many different journals and published book chapters.

Mills received a BA and a Doctorate from Harvard University.

== Selected publications ==
- Mills, A. (1986). The meaningful universe. Culture, 6(2), 81–91.
- Mills, A. (1988). A comparison of Witsuwit'en cases of the reincarnation type with Gitksan and Beaver. Journal of Anthropological Research, 44, 385–415.
- Mills, A. (1994). Making a scientific investigation of ethnographic cases suggestive of reincarnation. In D. Young & J.-G. A. Goulet (Eds.), Being Changed by Cross-Cultural Encounters: The Anthropology of Extraordinary Experience, Peterborough, Ontario: Broadview Press, pp. 237–269.
- Mills, A. (2001). Sacred land and coming back: How Gitxsan and Witsuwit'en reincarnation stretches Western boundaries. Canadian Journal of Native Studies, 21, 309–331.
- Mills, A. (2003). Are children with imaginary playmates and children said to remember previous lives cross-culturally comparable categories? Transcultural Psychiatry, 40, 63–91.
- Mills, A. (August 2004). Body/gender and spirit fits and misfits in three cases: A preliminary exploration of the role of reincarnation in two-spirit people. Paper presented at 24th Annual Conference of the Society for the Anthropology of Consciousness; 24–28 March 2004; University of California at Berkeley.
- Mills, A. (2006). Back from death: Young adults in northern India who as children were said to remember a previous life, with or without a shift in religion (Hindu to Moslem or vice versa). Anthropology and Humanism Quarterly, 31, 141–156.
- Mills, A. (2010). Understanding the conundrum of rebirth experience of the Beaver, Gitxsan, and Witsuwit'en. Anthropology and Humanism, 35, 172–191.
- Mills, A., & Champion, L. (1996). Reincarnation as integration, adoption out as dissociation: Examples from First Nations northwest British Columbia.Anthropology of Consciousness, 7(3), 30–43.
- Mills, A., Haraldsson, E., & Keil, H. H. J. (1994). Replication studies of cases suggestive of reincarnation by three independent investigators. Journal of the American Society for Psychical Research, 88, 207–219.
- Mills, A., & Sobodin, R. (Eds.) (1994). Amerindian Rebirth: Reincarnation Belief among North American Indians and Inuit. Toronto: University of Toronto Press.
