= Life Before Life =

2005 book by Jim B. Tucker

- Author: Jim B. Tucker
- Publisher: New York : St. Martin's Press.
- Publication date: 2005
- ISBN: 0-312-32137-6
- OCLC: 59223926
- Dewey Decimal: 133.9/01/35 22
- LC Class: BL515 .T77 2005

Life Before Life: A Scientific Investigation of Children's Memories of Previous Lives is a 2005 book written by psychiatrist Jim B. Tucker, which presents an overview of more than 40 years of reincarnation research at the University of Virginia, into children's reports of past-life memories. The book also discusses "birthmarks and birth defects that match those of a deceased person who is identified by the child". The foreword to the book is written by Ian Stevenson.

This book proposes that consciousness can be considered separately from the brain, which provides a basis for claims of reincarnation. Tucker discusses objections to reincarnation: the paucity of persons who actually claim to remember a past life, the fragility of memories, the population explosion, the mind–body problem, fraud, and others. Tucker states that none of the cases examined are perfect, and that "faulty memory by informants" is seen to be the "best normal explanation for many of the cases" reviewed in the book. The version of reincarnation discussed is typically incompatible with common religious beliefs around reincarnation, specifically in relation to karma.

Life Before Life has been reviewed in Philosophical Practice, and PsycCRITIQUES.

== See also ==
- Children's Past Lives
- European Cases of the Reincarnation Type
- Old Souls: The Scientific Evidence For Past Lives
- Reincarnation in popular western culture
- Satwant Pasricha
- Twenty Cases Suggestive of Reincarnation
- Where Reincarnation and Biology Intersect
