= Xenoglossy =

Paranormal phenomenon involving unnatural foreign language ability

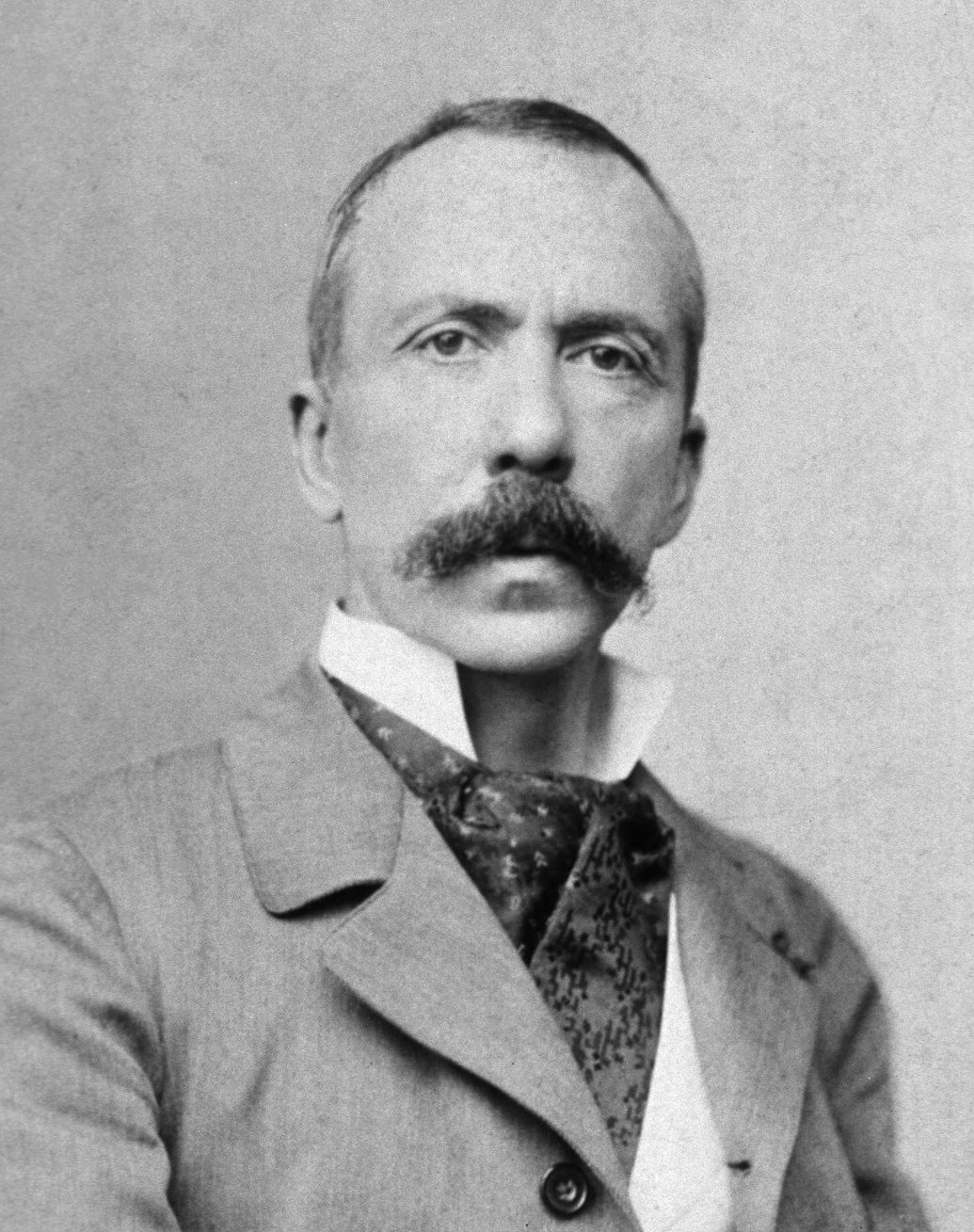
French parapsychologist Charles Richet coined the term xenoglossy in 1905.

Xenoglossy (/ˌziːnəˈɡlɒsi, ˌzɛ-, -noʊ-/), also written xenoglossia (/ˌziːnəˈɡlɒsiə, ˌzɛ-, -noʊ-/) and sometimes also known as xenolalia, is the supposedly paranormal phenomenon in which a person is allegedly able to speak, write or understand a foreign language that they could not have acquired by natural means. The term derives from the Ancient Greek xenos (ξένος), "foreigner" and glōssa (γλῶσσα), "tongue" or "language". The term xenoglossy was first used by French parapsychologist Charles Richet in 1905. Accounts of xenoglossy are found in the New Testament, and contemporary claims have been made by parapsychologists and reincarnation researchers such as Ian Stevenson. Doubts have been expressed that xenoglossy is an actual phenomenon, and there is no scientifically admissible evidence supporting any of the alleged instances of xenoglossy.

Two types of xenoglossy are distinguished. Recitative xenoglossy is the use of an unacquired language incomprehensibly, while responsive xenoglossy refers to the ability to intelligibly employ the unlearned language as if already acquired.

== Christianity ==
This phenomenon is mentioned in Acts of the Apostles chapter 2 at Pentecost, when the first disciples of Jesus Christ, gathered together, numbering one hundred and twenty, and of the tongues of fire landed on each of them, formalizing the coming of the Spirit in an episode of inspired communication that allows the disciples to express themselves in languages other than Galilean and to be understood by strangers. Several accounts of miraculous abilities of some people to read, write, speak or understand a foreign language as mentioned in the Bible have been related in similar Christian accounts in the Middle Ages. Similar claims were also made by some Pentecostal theologians in 1901.

== Spiritualism ==
Claims of mediums speaking foreign languages were made by Spiritualists in the 19th century. More recent claims of xenoglossy have come from reincarnation researchers who have alleged that individuals were able to recall a language spoken in a past life. Some reports of xenoglossy have surfaced in the popular press, such as Czech speedway rider Matěj Kůs who in September 2007 supposedly awoke after a crash and was able to converse in perfect English; however press reports of his fluency in English were based entirely on anecdotal stories told by his Czech teammates. Xenoglossy has been claimed to have occurred during exorcisms.

== Notable claims ==
=== Ian Stevenson ===
Canadian parapsychologist and psychiatrist at the University of Virginia Ian Stevenson claimed there were a handful of cases that suggested evidence of xenoglossy. These included two where a subject under hypnosis could allegedly converse with people speaking the foreign language, instead of merely being able to recite foreign words. Sarah Thomason, a linguist at the University of Michigan, reanalyzed these cases, concluding that "the linguistic evidence is too weak to provide support for the claims of xenoglossy".

- When Stevenson investigated an American housewife known as "T. E" who exhibited the male personality of a Swedish farmer named "Jensen Jacoby" while under hypnosis, he reported that the subject was able to converse in Swedish, albeit not fluently. However, Thomason's reanalysis concluded that "Jensen" could not convincingly be claimed to speak Swedish; writing that though "Jensen" had a total vocabulary of about 100 words, "this is not very impressive when compared with the thousands of words known by any native speaker of any natural language, even taking into account the limited contexts in which Jensen spoke Swedish." Thomason found that "Jensen" gave no complex sentences, mostly giving one or two word answers, and concluded, "[Stevenson's] demonstration that there was no fraud in the case is convincing, but his claim that Jensen had the capacity to speak Swedish is not." Linguist William Samarin drew the same conclusion as Thomason.
- Stevenson investigated another American woman named Dolores Jay who exhibited the personality of a German teenage girl named "Gretchen" while hypnotized. He claimed that the subject was able to converse in German. Thomason's reanalysis, while acknowledging that the evidence against fraud was convincing, concluded that "Gretchen" could not converse fluently in German and that her speech was largely the repetition of German questions with different intonation, or utterances of one or two words. Thomason found that the German vocabulary of "Gretchen" was "minute" and her pronunciation was "spotty", adding that Dolores Jay had some previous exposure to German in TV programs and had looked at a German book.

William J. Samarin, a linguist from the University of Toronto, argues that Stevenson interacted with linguists in a selective and unprofessional manner, noting that Stevenson corresponded with one linguist for a period of six years "without raising any discussion about the kinds of thing that linguists would need to know," and that most of Stevenson's collaborators were "fellow believers" in the paranormal.

In a review of Stevenson's Unlearned Language: New Studies in Xenoglossy (1984), William Frawley wrote that Stevenson was too uncritically accepting of a paranormal interpretation of the cases. In one case, a female subject could only answer yes-or-no questions in German, which Frawley found unimpressive. In another, the female subject could speak Bengali with poor pronunciation. Frawley noted that she was raised in the language of Marathi (related to Bengali), had studied Sanskrit from which both Marathi and Bengali derive, and was living in a town with thousands of Bengalis. He concluded: "Stevenson does not consider enough linguistic evidence in these cases to warrant his metaphysics."

Psychologist David Lester evaluated Stevenson's cases and wrote the subjects made grammatical mistakes, mispronounced words, and did not show a wide vocabulary of words in foreign language; he thus concluded that they cannot be considered evidence for xenoglossy.

=== Alfred Hulme ===
In the early 20th century, Alfred Hulme, a self-proclaimed Egyptologist, investigated a young girl named Ivy Carter Beaumont (also known as "Rosemary") from Blackpool, England, who claimed to be under the influence of the personality of a Babylonian princess. Hulme was convinced she spoke in an ancient Egyptian dialect. However, according to linguist Karen Stollznow, "Several scholars examined the data independently and concluded that Hulme's analyses were grossly inaccurate. Hulme had confused Middle Egyptian and Late Egyptian" and likely "falsified many results."

=== Eberhardt Gmelin ===
In 1791, Eberhardt Gmelin, a German physician often credited with discovering dissociative identity disorder, published a report entitled Materialien für die Anthropologie, in which he described a case of a 20-year-old German woman from the town of Stuttgart who would "exchange" her personality for that of a French aristocrat. During these "French" states, as Gmelin termed them, she was able to speak French perfectly, despite never having visited a francophone country or been taught the language, and speak her own native tongue, German, with a French accent. However, this cannot be accepted as an example of xenoglossy, as the woman had probably picked up bits of the language from aristocratic refugees who had arrived at Stuttgart in 1789, the beginning of the French Revolution.

== Explanations ==
Most cases of recitative xenoglossy have been interpreted as instances of cryptomnesia, where memories of a language acquired earlier in life re-enter the consciousness in certain exceptional circumstances.

== See also ==
- Automatic writing
- Foreign accent syndrome
- Speaking in tongues
- Telepathy

== Bibliography ==
- Cooper-Rompato, Christine F. (2010). The Gift of Tongues: Women's Xenoglossia in the Later Middle Ages. Pennsylvania State University Press. ISBN 978-0-271-03615-1.
- Samarin, William J. (March 1976). "Review of Ian Stevenson Xenoglossy: A Review and Report of a Case". Language. 52 (1): 270–274. doi:10.2307/413229. hdl:1807/67799. JSTOR 413229.
- Stevenson, Ian (1974). Twenty Cases Suggestive of Reincarnation (Second revised and enlarged ed.). University of Virginia Press. ISBN 0813908728.
- Stevenson, Ian (1974). Xenoglossy: A Review and Report of a Case. Charlotte: University Press of Virginia.
- Stevenson, Ian (1984). Unlearned Language: New Studies in Xenoglossy. University of Virginia Press. ISBN 0813909945.
- Stevenson, Ian (2001). Children Who Remember Previous Lives: A Quest of Reincarnation. McFarland & Company. ISBN 0786409134.
- Stollznow, Karen (2014). Language Myths, Mysteries and Magic. Palgrave Macmillan. ISBN 978-1137404848.
- Thomason, Sarah G. (Winter 1984). "Do you Remember Your Previous Life's Language in Your Present Incarnation?". American Speech. 59 (4): 340–350. doi:10.2307/454785. JSTOR 454785.
- Thomason, Sarah G. (Summer 1987). "Past Tongues Remembered?". The Skeptical Inquirer. 11 (4): 367–375. Archived from the original on 2020-08-06.
- Thomason, Sarah G. (1996). "Xenoglossy" ( (PDF)). In Stein, Gordon (ed.). The Encyclopedia of the Paranormal. Prometheus Books. ISBN 1573920215. Archived from the original on 2023-12-03.
