= Basma bint Fakhri Al Said =

Omani royal

HH AlSayyida Basma bint Fakhri Al Said: بسمة بنت فخري آل سعيد
- Spouse: Adham bin Turki Al Said
- House: Al Bu Sa'id
- Father: Fakhri bin Mohammed Al Said
- Mother: Ibtisam Hasan Abdallah
- Religion: Ibadi Islam

Sayyida Basma bint Fakri Al Said (Arabic: بسمة بنت فخري آل سعيد) is an Omani royal and mental health advocate.

== Early life and education ==
Sayyida Basma was born in the United Kingdom to Sayyid Fakhri bin Mohammed Al Said and Ibtisam Hasan Abdallah. She earned a bachelor's degree from the University of Jordan in 2001 and a master's degree in health counseling from Curtin University of Technology in Australia in 2008. She later received training in Clinical Hypnotherapy and Prolonged Exposure Therapy (PET) from Harvard University.

== Career ==
In 2011, Sayyida Basma founded Whispers of Serenity, the first private mental health clinic of "its-kind" in the Sultanate of Oman. The clinic provides mental health and wellbeing services for individuals, couples, groups and corporates in the region.

She launched the Not Alone mental health awareness campaign in 2014, aimed at reducing stigma and promoting mental health outreach across Oman and the Gulf region. Elements of the campaign were reported locally as early as 2016–2017, including nationwide awareness activities and community engagement events organized by Whispers of Serenity.

For over 26 years of professional experience, she has conducted over 2000 trainings and workshops for various organizations and institutions across the Gulf region and internationally. Sayyida Basma has also delivered multiple TEDx talks and international workshops on mental health awareness.

Her work has been featured in international and regional media outlets, including CNN Arabia and Harper’s Bazaar Arabia.

In 2020, she was recognized as one of Oman’s 50 influential women shaping national development and was honoured on Omani Women’s Day. On that same year, Sayyida Basma was appointed 5x consecutively as an International Social Responsibility Ambassador by the International Union for Social Responsibility (IUSR).

From 2022 to 2024, she served as the first Omani Arab judge for The Diana Award charity. In 2023, she became the first Omani personally invited by Prince William to attend the official Diana Award ceremony in the United Kingdom.

In 2025, Sayyida Basma was elected Regional Vice President for the Eastern Mediterranean at the World Federation for Mental Health, becoming the first Omani to hold the position.

== Personal life ==
She is married to Sayyid Adham bin Turki Al Said and they have four children.
