= Abacomancy =

Form of divination

Abacomancy, also known as Amathomancy (from the Greek word "amathos" meaning sand) a form of divination based on the interpretation of the patterns in dust, dirt, silt, sand, or the ashes of the recently deceased. Reading the patterns is believed to give some insight into the future. Readers drop the dirt, sand, or ashes on a flat surface and start looking for a pattern that may represent symbols or pictures. They interpret these symbols and pictures to what is going to happen in the future. Some look for certain symbols that are seen over and over. American abstract expressionist painter Jackson Pollock was famous for his series of paintings on abacomancy, which focused on the patterns in the paintings he made to foretell the future.

== See also ==
- Divination
- List of basic parapsychology topics
- Methods of divination
