= Journey of Souls (book) =

1994 book by Michael Newton

- Author: Dr. Michael Newton
- Language: English
- Genre: Pseudoscience, Spiritual case studies
- Publisher: Llewellyn Publications, USA
- Publication date: 1994
- Publication place: United States
- Media type: Print (Paperback)
- Followed by: Destiny of Souls

Journey of Souls is a book by hypnotherapist Dr. Michael Newton (9 December 1931 – 22 September 2016), published in 1994 by Llewellyn Publications. The book contains the purported recollections of 29 people after their prior deaths, relayed while under hypnosis. Its subject matter includes past life regressions and "Life Between Lives" therapy, which claims to transport the patient to where the human soul spends time before reincarnation.

The testimony within the book presents the afterlife as a journey where individual consciousness undergoes reflection and transformation. Hierarchies of souls are described, with souls clustered into groups or larger entities.

A follow-up, Destiny of Souls, was released by Newton in 2000.

== Reception ==
Journey of Souls sold 750,000 copies as of 2021, making it one of the highest selling books published by Llewellyn. It received public praise from celebrities Shirley MacLaine and Megan Fox.
