= Irreducible Mind =

2007 psychology book

- Author: Edward F. Kelly; Emily Williams Kelly; Adam Crabtree; Alan Gauld; Michael Grosso; Bruce Greyson
- Published: 2007 Rowman & Littlefield
- Pages: 800 pp.
- ISBN: 9780742547926

Irreducible Mind: Toward a Psychology for the 21st Century is a 2007 psychological book by Edward Francis Kelly, Emily Williams Kelly, Adam Crabtree, Alan Gauld, Michael Grosso, and Bruce Greyson. It attempts to bridge contemporary cognitive psychology and mainstream neuroscience with "rogue phenomena", which the authors argue exist in near-death experiences, psychophysiological influence, automatism, memory, genius, and mystical states.

The authors' approach repudiates the conventional theory of human consciousness as a material epiphenomenon that can be fully explained in terms of physical brain processes and advances the mind as an entity independent of the brain or body. They advance an alternative "transmission" or "filter" theory of the mind-brain relationship. In doing so they explain how dualism may be a more fundamental theory that rejects a materialistic perspective of consciousness.

== Authors ==
The authorship of the book is diverse, with representatives from the United States, United Kingdom, and Canada. The book is interdisciplinary in that the authors also come from various fields of psychology, science studies, and psychical research. Lead author Edward F. Kelly is Professor of Research in the Division of Perceptual Studies at the University of Virginia School of Medicine.

== Contents ==
The book begins by presenting a brief overview of contemporary neuroscience followed by a summary of the approach to scientific psychology proposed by Frederic W. H. Myers. Myers (and William James) posited that a "true science of mind should seriously take into account all kinds of human experiences before prematurely accepting a theory of mind". Kelly argues that modern psychology has continued, contrary to the advice by Myers and James, to ignore phenomena from psychical research and religious experience simply because they don't fit into the prevalent views of mind.

The book endorses phenomena related to psychosomatic medicine, placebo effects, near-death experiences, mystical experiences, and creative genius, to argue for a "strongly dualistic theory of mind and brain". Irreducible Mind depicts the mind as an entity independent of the brain or body, with which it causally interacts and the death of which it survives. The book "challenges neuroscientific reductionism" as it argues that properties of minds cannot be fully explained by those of brains.

The book is broken into 9 sections followed by an introductory bibliography on psychical research and 100 pages of references.

- Chapter 1: A View from the Mainstream: Contemporary Cognitive Neuroscience and the Consciousness Debates
- Chapter 2: F. W. H. Myers and the Empirical Study of the Mind-Body Problem
- Chapter 3: Psychophysiological Influence
- Chapter 4: Memory
- Chapter 5: Automatism and Secondary Centers of Consciousness
- Chapter 6: Unusual Experiences Near Death and Related Phenomena
- Chapter 7: Genius
- Chapter 8: Mystical Experience
- Chapter 9: Toward a Psychology for the 21st Century

== Reception ==
Andreas Sommer writing in Journal of Mind and Behavior after providing a complete review of the book content, praised the work for its thoroughness in addressing its multidisciplinary subject and "a constructively critical and genuinely scientific tone and spirit" maintained by the authors throughout the work. Sommer argued that "the book has the potential to serve as an invaluable guide for psychologists and other scholars who are aware of the increasing crisis and lack of orientation within modern academic psychology."

Critics Mitchell G. Ash, Horst Gundlach and Thomas Sturm negatively reviewed the book in American Journal of Psychology in 2010. They objected to some inaccuracies and omissions in lead author Edward F. Kelly's representation of history of physicalism. They also objected to what they see as lack of specifications in Kelly's representation of the mind–body problem that the book's authors claim to offer a solution to, some ambiguities in their proposed dualist "receiver theory" of mind-brain interaction as well as ignoring plausible versions of the type identity theory that they refute in their work. The critics also highlight what they see as the authors' failure to elaborately cite empirical evidences from alleged paranormal phenomena to support their theory and instead referring readers for specifics of the evidence to the large bibliography of psychical literature listed in the book's appendix. They also pointed to the controversial nature of the psi phenomena and discounted the authors' references to them (such as near-death experiences) on the ground that they are anecdotal.

In a reply to the above negative review, lead author, Edward Francis Kelly, commented that "the empirical inadequacies of physicalism are evident whether one takes the evidence from psychical research seriously or not."

The critics, in their rejoinder, found an irony in Kelly's justification for the shortcomings that they perceived in the historical background of the work considering the authors' inclusion of a CD-ROM copy of the Human Personality and Its Survival of Bodily Death by F.W.H. Myers as a companion to the book as well as having "a long chapter (by Emily Kelly) on the history of psi and related research since the 19th century." They insisted that the authors' "broad and oversimplified" description of physicalism made it difficult to understand what specific doctrine is allegedly refuted by their empirical research.

Clinical neurologist Sebastian Dieguez argued that the book is "painstakingly redundant, astoundingly arrogant in its claims and intents". He wrote that the authors of Irreducible Mind took reports of paranormal phenomena and wild claims at face value, utilized "quantum babble", and formed an ignorant "soul of the gaps" argument.

Alexander Moreira-Almeida, reviewing the book in the Journal of Nervous and Mental Disease, praised the authors "for their courage and scholarship in dealing with such a controversial topic" and presenting thought-provoking ideas for the mind-body problem while stating that a wider transcultural scope and views by experts in philosophy of science would have been also useful.

Paul Marshal, writing in Journal of Consciousness Studies, described the book a monumental work with far-reaching revolutionary ambitions, "a heavyweight intellectual contribution that will be indispensable to those interested in late 19th-century reactions to scientific naturalism, to investigators of anomalous experiences, and to students of consciousness studies on the lookout for stimulating data and ideas."

== See also ==
- The Conscious Mind
- Extra-Sensory Perception
- Parapsychology: Frontier Science of the Mind
- Varieties of Anomalous Experience
