= European Cases of the Reincarnation Type =

2003 book by Ian Stevenson

- Author: Ian Stevenson
- Subject: Reincarnation research
- Publication date: 2003
- ISBN: 0-7864-1458-8

European Cases of the Reincarnation Type is a 2003 book by psychiatrist Ian Stevenson, who conducted research into claims of reincarnation. The work focuses on different reincarnation research case studies in a Western setting. It was Stevenson's last book before he died in 2007.

== Purpose ==
Stevenson states in the preface that the book has three purposes:

- 1) To show that cases of the [reincarnation] type ... occur in European cultures, where fewer individuals believe in reincarnation than in Asia.
- 2) To show that essential features of these cases are similar to those found in Asia, Africa, and Northwest North American native tribes.
- 3) To show that some of the cases reported provide evidence of information transmitted by means outside of normal communication—extrasensory perception being one and reincarnation another. Stevenson also hopes that this book will stimulate the reporting and investigating of more cases of this type from Western cultures.

== Cases of the reincarnation type ==
European Cases of the Reincarnation Type focuses on different reincarnation research case studies in a Western setting. This approach addresses a possible objection to some of Stevenson's previous work, reported from foreign cultures such as India, where many people already have a world-view inclusive of reincarnation.

The book examines 40 European cases and includes a section on the belief in reincarnation among Europeans. The book describes behaviors or statements made by individuals, most frequently during childhood, that would be completely foreign to their upbringing or genetic factors. For example, David Llewellyn, born in England in 1970, possessed a significant knowledge of Jewish religious and dietary customs and also experienced nightmares and phobias with themes of concentration camps.

The book shows that "cases of the reincarnation type occur in modern western cultures", and many of these are similar to those from Asia where a belief in reincarnation is more widespread. However, in the final chapter of the book Stevenson concludes that "European cases of children who seem to remember a previous life clearly do not provide the strongest evidence of reincarnation that we have". And he adds that "I nevertheless conclude that for some of them reincarnation is the best interpretation, albeit not the only one".

== Reviews ==
A review in the American Journal of Psychiatry described the book as providing "an inspiring example of application of a painstaking protocol to sift facts from fancy". The book has also been reviewed in the Journal of Psychosomatic Research and the Journal of Nervous and Mental Disease.

== See also ==
- Life Before Life: A Scientific Investigation of Children's Memories of Previous Lives
- Old Souls: The Scientific Evidence For Past Lives 1999
- Where Reincarnation and Biology Intersect
- Children's Past Lives
