= Sarah Thomason =

American scholar of linguistics

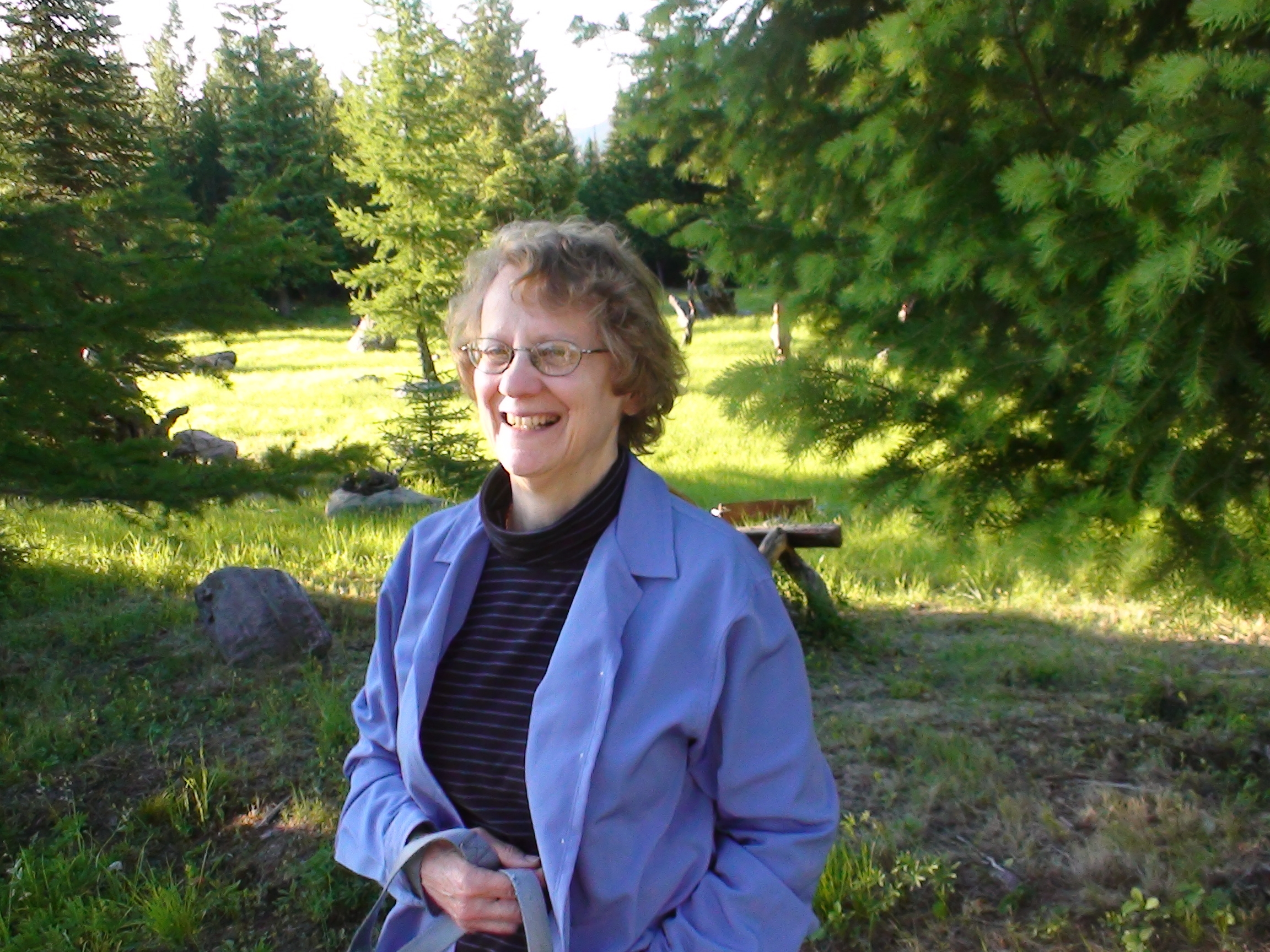
- Thomason in July 2012
- Born: 1939 (age 86–87); Evanston, Illinois
- Mother: Marion Griswold Grey
- Awards: Wilbur Cross Medal

Academic background
- Education: Stanford University (BA); Yale University (MA, PhD)
- Thesis: Noun suffixation in Serbo-Croatian dialects (1968)
- Doctoral advisor: Alexander Schenker

Academic work
- Discipline: Linguist
- Institutions: University of Pittsburgh; University of Michigan
- Website: www-personal.umich.edu/~thomason/

Sarah "Sally" Thomason (née Grey; born 1939) is an American scholar of linguistics, Bernard Bloch distinguished professor emerita at the University of Michigan. She is best known for her work on language contact, historical linguistics, pidgins and creoles, Slavic Linguistics, Native American languages and typological universals. She also has an interest in debunking linguistic pseudoscience, and has collaborated with publications such as the Skeptical Inquirer, The Encyclopedia of the Paranormal and American Speech, in regard to claims of xenoglossy.

== Career ==
=== Early career ===
Sarah Thomason received a B.A. in German from Stanford University in 1961. While studying this B.A., she had the opportunity to study a course in linguistics. This course eventually led her to do her application for graduation work in linguistics, when she was nominated for the Woodrow Wilson National Fellowship Foundation program. She later turned down this fellowship. After spending a year in Germany mastering the language, she was re-awarded the Fellowship and was admitted into Yale University, where she completed both an M.A. in 1965 and a Ph.D. in 1968 in linguistics. She taught Slavic Linguistics at Yale from 1968 to 1971, before moving to the University of Pittsburgh in 1972. She was named the William J. Gedney Collegiate Professor of Linguistics at the University of Michigan in 1999, and received the highest honor granted by the University of Michigan to its faculty by being named the Bernard Bloch Distinguished University Professor of Linguistics in 2016. She was also Chair of the Department of Linguistics from 2010 to 2013.

Thomason was interested in learning how to do fieldwork on the Indo-European languages. She decided that Indo-European languages from Eastern Europe would be best suited for research as Western European languages had been already thoroughly studied and the literature was vast. She traveled to the former Yugoslavia and started preparing her project on Serbo-Croatian, with the intention of focusing her career on Slavic studies. Thomason spent a year in this region writing her dissertation project on noun suffixation in Serbo-Croatian dialectology. Thomason did not, however, continue focusing on either Slavic or on Indo-European languages. Instead, Thomason's career focus shifted in 1974, when she encountered literature about pidgins and creoles. She realized that language contact was crucial for an understanding of language change. Since then, the vast majority of Thomason's work focuses on language contact phenomena.

=== Current work ===
Thomason is also known for her contributions to the study of Native American languages. Thomason's interest in these languages started with her studies on pidgin languages, specifically pidgin Delaware, derived from Delaware languages, and Chinook Jargon. She later became interested in Salishan languages, a field that she has been studying for over thirty years. She has spent every summer since 1980 studying Montana Salish, also known as the Salish-Pend d'Oreille language, talking with its last fluent speakers for documentation, as well as creating a dictionary and materials for the Salish and Pend d'Oreille Culture Committee language program.

Thomason has argued that language change could be a product of deliberate action driven by its speakers, who may consciously create dramatic changes in their usage, if strong motivation is present. This view challenges the current assumption in historical linguistics that, on one hand, deliberate language change can only produce minor changes to a language, and, on the other, that an individual on his or her own is not able to produce language change. While she admits that the permanence of the change is dependent on social and linguistic probability, she emphasizes these factors do not invalidate the possibility of permanent change occurring. Thomason argues that under a situation of language contact bilingual speakers can adapt loanwords to their language structure, and that speakers are also capable of rejecting changes to the structure of their language. Both of these cases show conscious and deliberate actions from the part of the speakers to change their language.

Thomason has also criticized alleged cases of xenoglossy from a professional point of view as a linguist. Her article Past tongues remembered? has been reprinted in different publications and translated into French and German. Thomason has examined, among others, the cases presented by author Ian Stevenson. In Stevenson's works Xenoglossy: A Review and Report of A Case, and Unlearned Language: New Studies in Xenoglossy, he presents the case studies of subjects who claimed to remember having lived past lives and to be able to speak in a foreign language when they were under hypnosis. In Stevenson's opinion, their ability to speak a foreign language without having been exposed to it could be proof of reincarnation. Thomason, however, analyzed those cases and concluded that the subjects did not show real knowledge of the foreign language they said they were able to speak. Thomason pointed out that the performance of the individuals was by far not to the standards of that of a native speaker, as they showed very limited vocabulary and poor grammar in the foreign language. Thomason also noticed that the speech produced was many times limited to a repetition of some phrases or short answers, and it sometimes included words in a language different from the one subjects claimed to be able to speak. Thomason argues that the structure of the experiment allowed for the subjects to be able to guess the meaning of some of the questions by the hypnotists. She concludes that none of the individuals studied by Stevenson could prove xenoglossy, and that their knowledge of the foreign language could be explained by a combination of natural means such as exposure to the language, use of cognates, and guesses, amongst other resources.

She is one of the Language Log bloggers.

== Honors ==
Thomason has been a regular contributor to academic journals and publications specializing in the field of linguistics, as well as a guest lecturer at different universities around the world and a speaker at international conferences.

From 1988 to 1994, she was the editor of Language, the journal of the Linguistic Society of America (LSA). In 1999, she was the Collitz Professor at the LSA summer institute. In 2006, she was elected a Fellow of the LSA, and, in 2009, she served as President of the LSA. In 2000, she was President of the Society for the Study of the Indigenous Languages of the Americas. She was also Chair of the Linguistics and Language Sciences section of the American Association for the Advancement of Science in 1996, and Secretary of the section from 2001 to 2005.

She is currently an associate editor for the Journal of Historical Linguistics, as well as part of the advisory board of the Journal of Language Contact.

== Personal ==
She is married to the philosopher and computer scientist Richmond Thomason and is the mother of the linguist Lucy Thomason. Her mother was the ichthyologist Marion Griswold Grey.

== Selected works ==
- Thomason, Sarah G. and Terrence Kaufman (1988). Language contact, creolization, and genetic linguistics. Berkeley: University of California Press. ISBN 0-520-07893-4.
- Thomason, Sarah G. (2001). Language contact: an introduction. Georgetown University Press, 2001.
- Thomason, Sarah G. (2015). Endangered Languages: An Introduction. Cambridge University Press, 2015.
- Thomason, Sarah G. (1987) Past tongues remembered? The Skeptical Inquirer. Committee for Skeptical Inquiry. 11:367-75
- Thomason, Sarah G. (1984) Do you remember your previous life's language in your present incarnation?. American Speech. Duke University Press. 59:340-350.
