= Eugene Brody =

American psychiatrist

Eugene Bloor Brody (1921–2010) was an American psychiatrist. Brody was chairman of the Department of Psychiatry at the University of Maryland School of Medicine and Dean for Social and Behavioral Studies at the University of Maryland.

Brody was the son of Sophia and Samuel Brody; he was born in Columbia, Missouri, where his father was a professor of dairy science at the University of Missouri. Brody earned his B.A. and a Master's in experimental psychology at the University of Missouri, and graduated from Harvard Medical School in 1944. His postgraduate training was interrupted by military service; Brody became a captain in the Army Medical Corps in 1946, and served as a consultant in the Nuremberg trials. He joined the medical faculty of the University of Maryland in 1957, and worked there until his retirement in 1987.

In 1952 Brody co-edited with Frederick Redlich the widely read book, Psychotherapy With Schizophrenics. Brody was inspired by his mother, who had schizophrenia that began during Dr. Brody's childhood, and continued until his mother's death at the age of 96.

Brody was editor of The Journal of Nervous and Mental Disease for over forty years.

Brody was President of the World Federation for Mental Health from 1981 to 1983, and Secretary General from 1983 to 1999.
