= World Federation for Mental Health =

Non-governmental organization

The World Federation for Mental Health (WFMH) is an international, multi-professional non-governmental organization (NGO), including citizen volunteers and former patients. It was founded in 1948 in the same era as the United Nations (UN) and the World Health Organization (WHO).

== Aims ==
The goal of this international organization includes;

- The prevention of mental and emotional disorders;
- The proper treatment and care of those with such disorders;
- And the promotion of mental health

The Federation, through its members and contacts in more than 94 countries on six continents, has responded to international mental health crises through its role as the only worldwide grassroots advocacy and public education organization in the mental health field. Its organizational and individual membership includes mental health workers of all disciplines, consumers of mental health services, family members, and concerned citizens. At its very outset the WFMH was concerned with educating both the public and influential professionals, and with human relations, with a view both to the health of individuals and that of groups and nations. The WFMH founding document, "Mental Health and World Citizenship", understood "world citizenship" in terms of a "common humanity" respecting individual and cultural differences, and declared that "the ultimate goal of mental health is to help [people] live with their fellows in one world.

Members include mental health service providers and service users. In 2009, the World Fellowship for Schizophrenia and Allied Disorders, an international network of families of people with serious mental illness, merged with the World Federation. The World Federation has close ties with the World Health Organization. For many years after its founding, the WFMH was the only NGO of its kind with a close working relationship with UN agencies, particularly the WHO. In recent decades, though, a number of international mental health organizations, often limited to members of particular professions, have developed. In varying degree they have filled needs formerly addressed mainly by WFMH. The WFMH envisions a world in which mental health is a priority for all people. Public policies and programs reflect the crucial importance of mental health in the lives of individuals. The first Director General of the WHO, G. Brock Chisholm, who was a psychiatrist, was one of the leaders in forming the federation with the goal of creating a representative organization that could consult with the UN on mental health issues.

The mission of the World Federation for Mental Health is to promote the advancement of mental health awareness, prevention of mental disorders, advocacy, and best practice recovery focused interventions worldwide. Mental health day is celebrated at the initiative of the World Federation of Mental Health and WHO supports this initiative through raising awareness on mental health issues using its strong relationships with the Ministries of health and civil society organizations across the globe. Mental Illness Awareness Week (MIAW) is an annual national public education campaign designed to help open the eyes of Canadians to the reality of mental illness. The week was established in 1992 by the Canadian Psychiatric Association, and is now coordinated by the Canadian Alliance on Mental Illness and Mental Health (CAMIMH) in cooperation with all its member organizations and many other supporters across Canada.

== List of presidents ==
- John Rawlings Rees (1948) - London, England
- Dr. Andre Repond (1949–1950)
- Prof. W. Line (1950–1951) - Toronto, Canada
- Prof. Alfonso Millan (1951–1952) - Mexico, DF
- Dr. M.K. el Kholy (1952–1953) - Cairo, Egypt
- Prof. H.C. Rumke (1953–1954) - Utrecht, Netherlands
- Dr. Frank Fremont-Smith (1954–1955) - New York, USA
- Prof. Nilo Maki (1955–1956) - Helsinki, Finland
- Dr. Eduardo Enrique Krapf (1956–1957) - Buenos Aires, Argentina
- Dr. Margaret Mead (1957–1958) - New York, USA
- Dr. Brock Chisholm (1957–1958) - Victoria, Canada
- Prof. Hans Hoff (1959–1960) - Vienna, Austria
- Prof. Paul Sivadon (1960–1961) - Paris, France
- Prof. A.C. Pacheco de Silva (1961–1962) - São Paulo, Brazil
- Dr. George S Stevenson (1961–1962) - New York, USA
- Dr. Phon Sangsingkeo (1962–1963) - Bangkok, Thailand
- Prof. G.P. Alivisatos (1963–1964) - Athens, Greece
- Dr. Alan Stoller (1964–1965) - Victoria, Australia
- Sir Samual Manuwa (1965–1966) - Lagos, Nigeria
- Dr. Otto Klineberg (1966–1967) - Canada
- Prof. Morris Carstairs (1968–1972) - Edinburgh, Scotland
- Prof. Michael Beaubrun (1972–1974) - Kingston, Jamaica
- Prof. Tsung-yi Lin (1975–1979) - Vancouver, Canada
- Mr. Gowan Guest (1979–1981) - Esq, Vancouver, Canada
- Prof. Eugene Brody (1981–1983) - Baltimore, USA
- Dr. Estefania Aldaba-Lim (1983–1985) - Manila, Philippines
- Mrs. Edith Morgan (1985–1987) - London, England
- Dr. Gamal M. Abou El Azayem (1987–1989) - Cairo, Egypt
- Dr. Stanislas Flache (1989–1991) - Geneva, Switzerland
- Dr. Max W. Abbott (1991–1993) - Auckland, New Zealand
- Dr. Federico Puente-Silva (1993–1995) - Mexico DF, Mexico
- Mrs. Beverly B. Long, Georgia (1995–1997) - USA
- Prof. Marten deVries (1997–1999) - Maastricht, Netherlands
- Dr. Ahmed Abou El Azayem (1999–2001) - Cairo, Egypt
- Mrs. Pirkko Lahti (2001–2003) - Helsinki, Finland
- Dr. Patt Franciosi (2003–2005) - Wisconsin, USA
- Mrs. Shona Sturgeon (2005–2007) - Cape Town, South Africa
- Prof. John R.M. Copeland (2007–2009) - London, England
- Mr. Anthony Fowke (2009–2011) - Perth, Australia
- Mrs. Deborah Wan (2011–2013) - Hong Kong, SAR
- Prof. George Christodoulou (2013–2015) - Greece
- Dr. Gabriel Ivbijaro (2015–2017) - United Kingdom
- Dr. Alberto Trimboli (2017–2019) - Buenos Aires, Argentina
- Dr. Ingrid Daniels (2019–2021) - South Africa
- Nasser Loza (2021–2023) - Egypt
- Professor Tsuyoshi Akiyama (2023- Present) - Japan

== Notable members ==
- Werner Villinger – German psychiatrist, educating the public
- Tsung-yi Lin – Honorary president
- Eugene Brody – President, 1981 to 1983; Secretary General from 1983 to 1999.

== Conferences and Congresses ==
Event	Year	Location	Theme
World Congress	1948	London, England, UK	Founding meeting of WFMH
World Congress	1951	Mexico DF, Mexico	
World Congress	1954	Toronto, Canada	
World Congress	1961	Paris, France	
World Congress	1968	London, England, UK	
World Congress	1973	Sydney, Australia	Cultures in Collision (25th Anniversary Congress)
World Congress	1977	Vancouver, Canada	Today's Priorities in Mental Health: Knowing and Doing
World Congress	1979	Salzburg, Austria	The Mental Health of Children and Families
World Congress	1981	Manila, Philippines	Mental Health, Cultural Values and Social Development: A Look into the '80s
World Congress	1983	Washington, DC, USA	Personal and social responsibility in the search for mental health: Collaboration between volunteers, professionals and governments in the formation of mental health policy and the delivery of services.
World Congress	1985	Brighton, England, UK	Mental Health 2000 A.D. [Sub-theme: Action Programs for a World in Crisis.]
World Congress	1987	Cairo, Egypt	The Many Worlds of Mental Health
World Congress	1989	Auckland, New Zealand	Mental Health – Everyone's Concern
World Congress	1991	Mexico DF, Mexico	People and Science: Together for Mental Health
World Congress	1993	Tokyo, Japan	Mental Health: Toward the 21st Century
World Congress	1995	Dublin, Ireland	Time for Reflection
World Congress	1997	Lahti, Finland	Cornerstones for Mental Health
World Congress	1998	London, England, UK	Partners for Mental Health: Nations for Mental Health (50th Anniversary Symposium)
World Congress	1999	Santiago, Chile	Interfaces in Mental Health: Poverty, Quality of Life and Society"
World Congress	2001	Vancouver, Canada	Respecting Diversity in Mental Health in a Changing World
World Congress	2003	Melbourne, Australia	Partnerships in Health
World Congress	2005	Cairo, Egypt	Equity and Mental Health
World Congress	2007	Hong Kong SAR, China	East Meets West: Impact of Culture on Mental Health
World Congress	2009	Athens, Greece	Working Together for Mental Health
World Congress	2011	Cape Town, South Africa	The African Footprint in Global Mental Health
World Congress	2013	Buenos Aires, Argentina	Social Inclusion through Interdisciplinary Interventions
World Congress	2015	Cairo, Egypt	
World Congress	2017	New Delhi, India	Partnerships in mental health
World Congress	2019	Buenos Aires, Argentina	Abordajes inclusivos en salud mental. Clínica, comunidad y derechos.

== World Mental Health Day ==
Year	Theme
1994	Improving the Quality of Mental Health Services throughout the World
1996	Women and Mental Health
1997	Children and Mental Health
1998	Mental Health and Human Rights
1999	Mental Health and Aging
2000–01	Mental Health and Work
2002	The Effects of Trauma and Violence on Children & Adolescents
2003	Emotional and Behavioural Disorders of Children & Adolescents
2004	The Relationship Between Physical & Mental Health: co-occurring disorders
2005	Mental and Physical Health Across the Life Span
2006	Building Awareness – Reducing Risk: Mental Illness & Suicide
2007	Mental Health in A Changing World: The Impact of Culture and Diversity
2008	Making Mental Health a Global Priority: Scaling up Services through Citizen Advocacy and Action
2009	Mental Health in Primary Care: Enhancing Treatment and Promoting Mental Health
2010	Mental Health and Chronic Physical Illnesses
2011	The Great Push: Investing in Mental Health
2012	Depression: A Global Crisis
2013	Mental health and older adults
2014	Living with Schizophrenia
2015	Dignity in Mental Health
2016	Psychological First Aid
2017	Mental health in the workplace
2018	Young people and mental health in a changing world
2019	Mental Health Promotion and Suicide Prevention
2020	Move for mental health: Increased investment in mental health
2021	Mental Health in an Unequal World
2022	Make Mental Health & Well-Being for All a Global Priority
2023	Mental Health is a universal human right
2024	It is time to Prioritize Mental Health in the Workplace
2025	Access to Services – Mental Health in Catastrophes and Emergencies
