= Anthropology of Consciousness =

- Discipline: consciousness
- Language: English
- Edited by: Nicole Torres, Gary Moore

Publication details
- History: 1990–present
- Publisher: Wiley-Blackwell for the AAA's Society for the Anthropology of Consciousness (U.S.A)
- Frequency: Biannual

Standard abbreviations
- ISO 4: Anthropol. Conscious.

Indexing
- ISSN: 1053-4202
- OCLC no.: 60640215

Links
- Journal homepage; Journal at AnthroSource

Anthropology of Consciousness is the primary publication of the Society for the Anthropology of Consciousness, a section of the American Anthropological Association (AAA). It has been published since 1990.

Editors Nicole Torres and Gary Moore began the position in August 2015.

Prior to joining the AAA, the Society was called "Association for the Anthropological Study of Consciousness" (AASC), and published the AASC Newsletter and AASC Quarterly and earlier newsletters were also published.

== Access ==
The journal is available online through AnthroSource, and abstracted in the following journals or CD-ROM services.

- Abstracts in Anthropology, from Volume 6, 1995.
- Anthropological Literature, from Volume 6, 1995.
- Exceptional Human Experience, from Volume 1, 1990 (selective).
- Sociological Abstracts, from Volume 6, 1995.
