= Where Reincarnation and Biology Intersect =

1997 book by Ian Stevenson

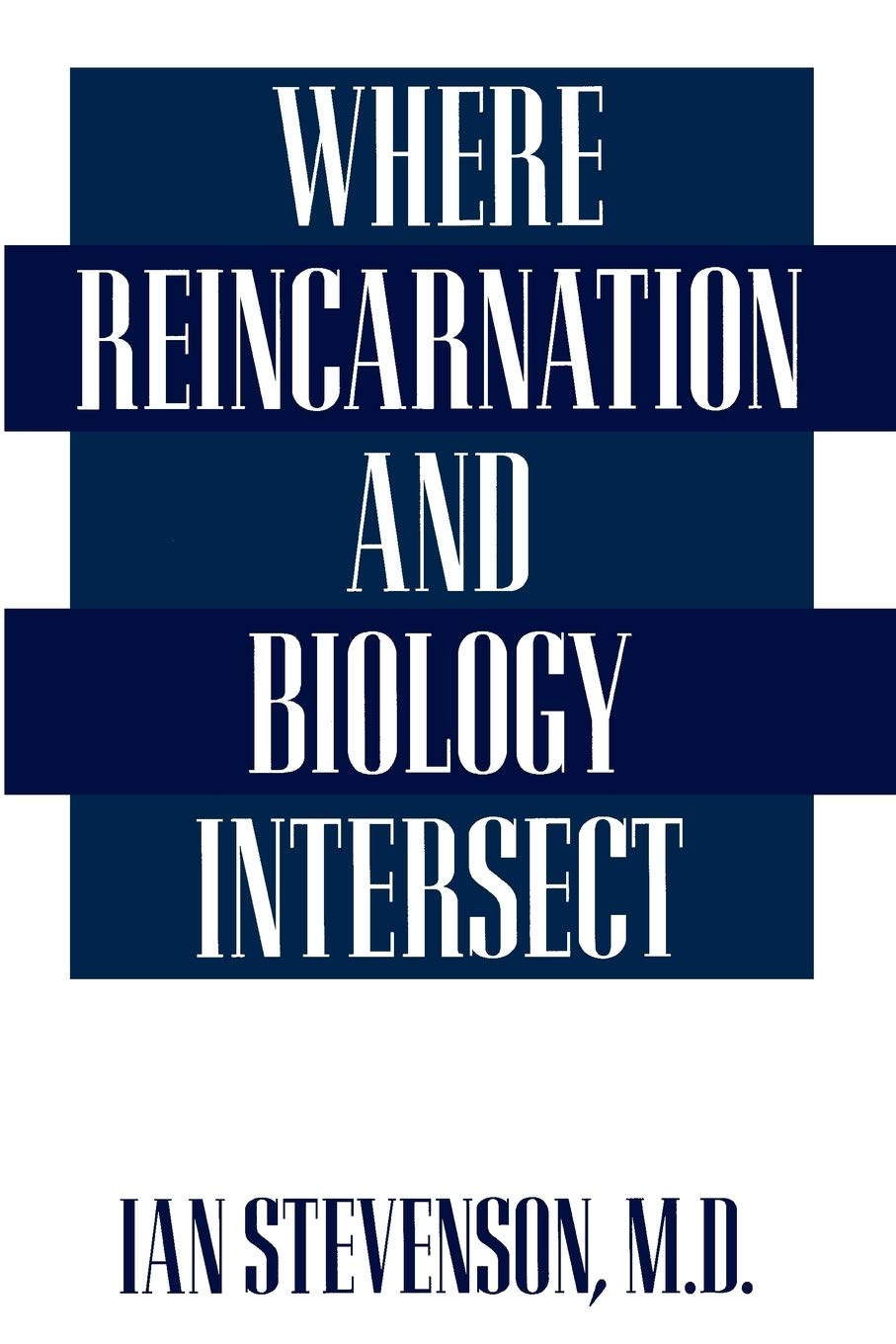
- Author: Ian Stevenson
- Subject: Reincarnation
- Publisher: Praeger
- Publication date: 1997
- ISBN: 0-275-95189-8

Where Reincarnation and Biology Intersect is a 1997 book by psychiatrist Ian Stevenson, published by Praeger. The book is about birthmarks and birth defects ostensibly associated with reincarnation. Where Reincarnation and Biology Intersect is written for the general reader and is a condensation of a two-part monograph Reincarnation and Biology: A Contribution to the Etiology of Birthmarks and Birth Defects (Praeger, 1997).

== Birthmarks and birth defects ==
Ian Stevenson examined reports of people in different parts of the world who claimed to remember past lives, mostly young children. He explored the idea that "birthmarks and other skin lesions and abnormalities may provide evidence of cutaneous injuries sustained in a previous life, thus supporting the notion of reincarnation".

Where Reincarnation and Biology Intersect is "modest in its claims". Stevenson calls some cases investigated "unsolved," where no deceased person has been found to match the birthmarks and memories of the child. Excluding unsolved and questionable cases, about 90 cases remain where there is a "correspondence found between birth marks on the child and similar marks or distinguishing features present on the body of the reincarnated personality during their lifetime, such as wounds, injuries and other stigmata". Examples include:

... a girl, born with markedly deformed fingers, who seemed to remember being a man whose fingers were cut off, and a boy, born with stubs for fingers on his right hand, who seemed to remember the life of a boy in another village who lost the fingers of his right hand in a fodder-chopping machine.

Where Reincarnation and Biology Intersect contains 35 illustrations, mostly photographs of the birthmarks and birth defects.

== Reviews ==
Book reviews of Where Reincarnation and Biology Intersect have been published in various journals. Joint reviews of Where Reincarnation and Biology Intersect and Reincarnation and Biology have also appeared in several journals.

== See also ==
- Life Before Life: A Scientific Investigation of Children's Memories of Previous Lives
- Old Souls: The Scientific Evidence For Past Lives
- European Cases of the Reincarnation Type
