= Foreknowledge =

Foreknowledge is knowledge regarding future events. It may also refer to:

- Foresight (disambiguation)
- Providentia
- Precognition, prior viewing of some future event
- Knowledge of predestination
- Melange (Dune)
- Prediction or forecasting, calculated, informed or uninformed guesses regarding future events
- Prophecy, future knowledge obtained from divine or supernatural entities
