= László Harasztosi =

Hungarian psychic

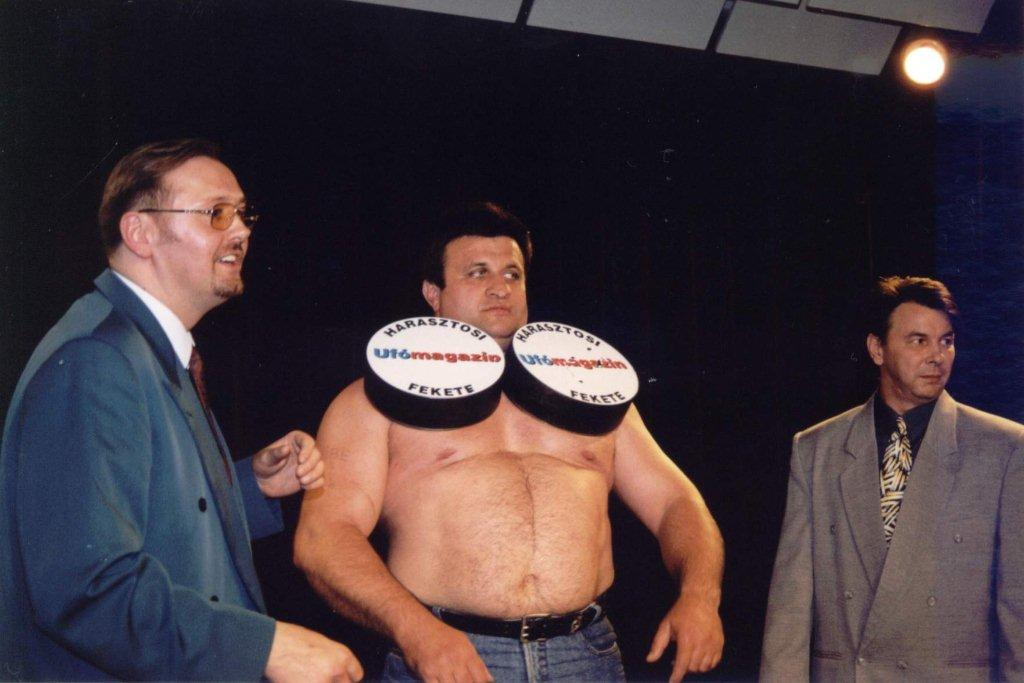
László Harasztosi at breaking the Guinness record

László Harasztosi, also known as Lazlo Hypnotist, is a psychic, bioenergeticist, and alternative medicine practitioner. His speciality is attaching metal objects on human bodies. When breaking the Guinness record in 1998, he placed two disks weighing altogether 57,64 kg (127 lbs) on László Fekete's chest (the strongest man of Hungary).

His activity consists of healing, performances in shows, and preparation of sportspeople. Cosmos Church of Universal Love was founded with his leadership. His book titled Cosmic energy – how autotherapy works and how to use the healing coin was published in 1996.

== Life ==
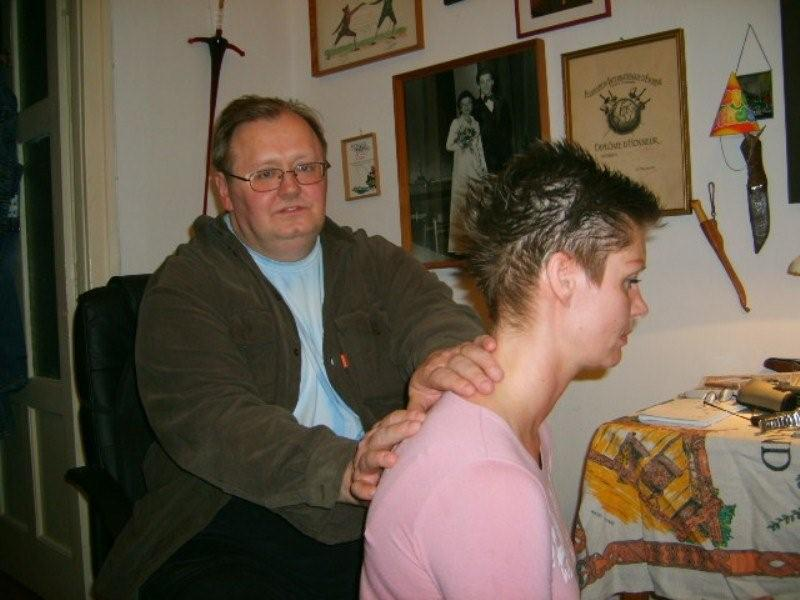
László Harasztosi at healing

He was born on 28 June 1963, in the Eastern Hungarian village of Berettyóújfalu. As he stated, his ability was discovered at the age of seven, when they noticed that his touch stops pain and his presence calms down children who have gone wild. Before the change of regime of 1989 in Hungary, he had to conceal his abilities for political reasons.

== Activity ==
=== Improving athletes' achievement ===
He claims to regularly charge up chosen athletes with focused cosmic energy, which creates further resources for them, enabling them to achieve better results, increase endurance, make their muscles more flexible, shorten reaction time and recovery time.

=== Psychic shows ===
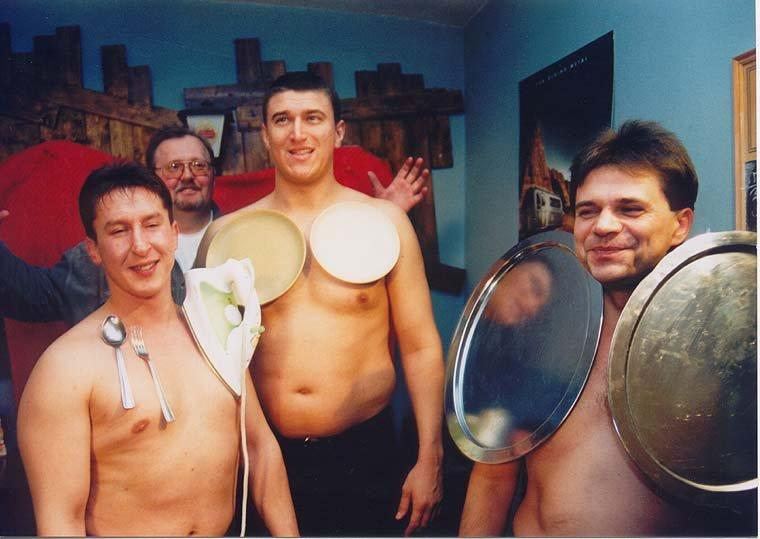
László Harasztosi attaching objects

- Attachment of tools: attaching cutlery or domestic appliances (e.g. an iron) on volunteers' bare torsos.
- Mass psychosis and hypnosis: with his "mental energy", he sticks chosen people to their seats or makes them stand up despite their will, or he makes them fall from a standing position even if they are not present in the room. On his command, the participants will imitate various sounds, they will sing, or speak about a topic specified by him.

He appeared in Hungary in the programme Esti Showder by RTL Klub, among other programmes.
