= Ian Stevenson =

American psychiatrist (1918–2007)

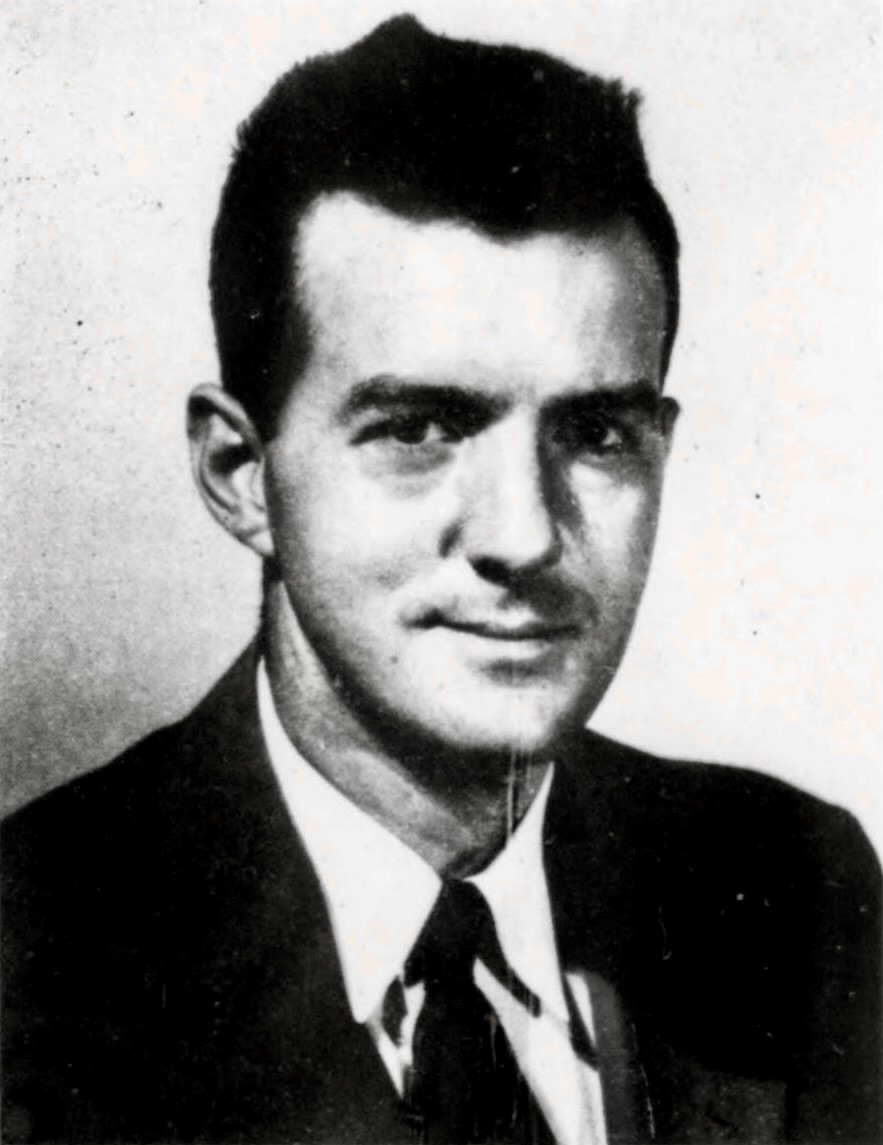
- Stevenson, c. 1952
- Born: October 31, 1918; Montreal, Quebec, Canada
- Died: February 8, 2007 (aged 88); Charlottesville, Virginia, United States
- Citizenship: Canada by birth; USA, naturalized 1949
- Education: University of St. Andrews (1937–1939); BSc (McGill University, 1942); MD (McGill University School of Medicine, 1943)
- Occupations: Psychiatrist, director of the Division of Perceptual Studies at the University of Virginia School of Medicine
- Known for: Reincarnation research, near-death studies, medical history taking
- Spouses: Octavia Reynolds (m. 1947) Margaret Pertzoff (m. 1985)

Ian Pretyman Stevenson (October 31, 1918 – February 8, 2007) was a Canadian-born American psychiatrist, the founder and director of the Division of Perceptual Studies at the University of Virginia School of Medicine. He was a professor at the University of Virginia School of Medicine for fifty years. He was chair of their department of psychiatry from 1957 to 1967, Carlson Professor of Psychiatry from 1967 to 2001, and research professor of psychiatry from 2002 until his death in 2007. He helped to found the Society for Scientific Exploration in 1982.

He is best known for his research into evidence of reincarnation – the premise that emotions, memories, and even physical bodily features can be passed on from one life to another. Over his forty years of international research, he amassed three thousand cases of children who claimed to remember past lives. Stevenson was the author of around three hundred papers and fourteen books on reincarnation, including Twenty Cases Suggestive of Reincarnation (1966), Reincarnation and Biology and its simplified version Where Reincarnation and Biology Intersect (both 1997), and European Cases of the Reincarnation Type (2003).

Stevenson was cautious in making claims about reincarnation. He emphasized that the information he collected was suggestive of reincarnation but "was not flawless and it certainly does not compel such a belief." He did, however, believe he had produced a body of evidence for reincarnation that should be taken seriously. His position was that reincarnation might possibly represent a third contributing factor, in addition to genetics and the environment, in the development of certain phobias, philias, unusual abilities, and illnesses.

In an obituary for Stevenson in The New York Times, Margalit Fox wrote that Stevenson's supporters saw him as a misunderstood genius, that his detractors regarded him as earnest but gullible, but that most scientists had simply ignored his research. Stevenson's critics contend that ultimately his conclusions are undermined by confirmation bias and motivated reasoning, and were reliant on anecdotal evidence rather than controlled experimental work. His case reports were also criticized for containing errors and omissions. Upon his retirement, Stevenson's work was continued by research colleagues such as Jim B. Tucker, Antonia Mills, Satwant Pasricha, and Erlendur Haraldsson.

== Background ==
=== Personal life and education ===
Ian Stevenson was born in Montreal and raised in Ottawa and was one of three children. His father, John Stevenson, was a Scottish lawyer who was working in Ottawa as the Canadian correspondent for The Times of London or The New York Times. His mother, Ruth, had an interest in theosophy and an extensive library on the subject, to which Stevenson attributed his own early interest in the paranormal. As a child he was often bedridden with bronchitis, a condition that continued into adulthood and engendered in him a lifelong love of books. According to Emily Williams Kelly, a colleague of his at the University of Virginia, he maintained a list of the books he had read, which numbered 3,535 between 1935 and 2003.

He studied medicine at St. Andrews University in Scotland from 1937 to 1939, but had to complete his studies in Canada because of the outbreak of the Second World War. He graduated from McGill University with a B.S.c. in 1942 and an M.D. in 1943. He was married to Octavia Reynolds from 1947 until her death in 1983. In 1985, he married Dr. Margaret Pertzoff (1926–2009), professor of history at Randolph-Macon Woman's College. She did not share his views on the paranormal, but tolerated them with what Stevenson called "benevolent silences."

=== Early career ===
After graduating, Stevenson conducted research in biochemistry. His first residency was at the Royal Victoria Hospital in Montreal (1944–1945), but his lung condition continued to bother him, and one of his professors at McGill advised him to move to Arizona for his health. He took up a residency at St. Joseph's Hospital in Phoenix, Arizona (1945–1946). After that, he held a fellowship in internal medicine at the Alton Ochsner Medical Foundation in New Orleans, became a Denis Fellow in Biochemistry at Tulane University School of Medicine (1946–1947), and a Commonwealth Fund Fellow in Medicine at Cornell University Medical College and New York Hospital (1947–1949). He became a U.S. citizen in 1949.

Emily Williams Kelly writes that Stevenson became dissatisfied with the reductionism he encountered in biochemistry, and wanted to study the whole person. He became interested in psychosomatic medicine, psychiatry and psychoanalysis, and in the late 1940s, worked at New York Hospital exploring psychosomatic illness and the effects of stress, and in particular why, for example, one person's response to stress might be asthma and another's high blood pressure.

He taught at Louisiana State University School of Medicine from 1949 to 1957 as assistant, then associate professor of psychiatry.

In the 1950s, he met Aldous Huxley (1894–1963), known for his advocacy of psychedelic drugs, and studied the effects of L.S.D. and mescaline, one of the first academics to do so. Ian Stevenson, in his course of studies, tried and studied L.S.D. himself, describing three days of "perfect serenity." He wrote that at the time he felt he could "never be angry again," but added, "As it happens that didn't work out, but the memory of it persisted as something to hope for."

From 1951, he studied psychoanalysis at the New Orleans Psychoanalytic Institute and the Washington Psychoanalytic Institute, graduating from the latter in 1958, a year after being appointed head of the department of psychiatry at the University of Virginia. The orthodoxy within psychiatry and psychoanalysis at the time held that the personality is more plastic in one's early years, so when he argued against this in his paper "Is the human personality more plastic in infancy and childhood?" (American Journal of Psychiatry, 1957) his paper was not received well by his colleagues. He wrote that their response prepared him for the rejection he experienced over his work on the paranormal.

== Reincarnation research ==
=== Early interest ===
Stevenson described as the leitmotif of his career his interest in why one person would develop one disease, and another something different. He came to believe that neither environment nor heredity could account for certain fears, illnesses and special abilities, and that some form of personality or memory transfer might provide a third type of explanation. He acknowledged, however, the absence of evidence of a physical process by which a personality could survive death and transfer to another body, and he was careful not to commit himself fully to the position that reincarnation occurs. He argued only that his case studies could not, in his view, be explained by environment or heredity, and that "reincarnation is the best – even though not the only – explanation for the stronger cases we have investigated." He said in 1974, looking back on his work:

[W]hat I do believe is that, of the cases we now know, reincarnation--at least for some--is the best explanation that we have been able to come up with. There is an impressive body of evidence and it is getting stronger all the time. I think a rational person, if he wants, can believe in reincarnation on the basis of evidence.

In 1958 and 1959, Stevenson contributed several articles and book reviews to Harper's about parapsychology, including psychosomatic illness and extrasensory perception, and in 1958, he submitted the winning entry to a competition organized by the American Society for Psychical Research, in honor of the philosopher William James (1842–1910). The prize was for the best essay on "paranormal mental phenomena and their relationship to the problem of survival of the human personality after bodily death." Stevenson's essay, "The Evidence for Survival from Claimed Memories of Former Incarnations" (1960), reviewed forty-four published cases of people, mostly children, who claimed to remember past lives. It caught the attention of Eileen J. Garrett (1893–1970), the founder of the Parapsychology Foundation, who gave Stevenson a grant to travel to India to interview a child who was claiming to have past-life memories. According to Jim Tucker, Stevenson found twenty-five other cases in just four weeks in India and was able to publish his first book on the subject in 1966, Twenty Cases Suggestive of Reincarnation.

Chester Carlson (1906–1968), the inventor of xerography, offered further financial help. Jim Tucker writes that this allowed Stevenson to step down as chair of the psychiatry department and set up a separate division within the department, which he called the Division of Personality Studies, later renamed the Division of Perceptual Studies.

When Carlson died in 1968, he left $1,000,000 to the University of Virginia to continue Stevenson's work. The bequest caused controversy within the university because of the nature of the research, but the donation was accepted, and Stevenson became the first Carlson Professor of Psychiatry.

=== Case studies ===
The bequest from Chester Carlson allowed Stevenson to travel extensively, sometimes as much as 55,000 miles (89,000 kilometres) a year, collecting around three thousand case studies based on interviews with children from Africa to Alaska.

In one case of claimed reincarnation, as Stevenson recounted it, a newborn girl in Sri Lanka screamed whenever she was carried near a bus or a bath. When she was old enough to talk, he said, she recounted a previous life as a girl of 8 or 9 who drowned after a bus knocked her into a flooded rice paddy; later investigation found the family of just such a dead girl living four or five kilometers away. The two families, Stevenson said, were believed to have had no contact. According to journalist Tom Shroder, "In interviewing witnesses and reviewing documents, Stevenson searched for alternate ways to account for the testimony: that the child came upon the information in some normal way, that the witnesses were engaged in fraud or self-delusion, that the correlations were the result of coincidence or misunderstanding. But in scores of cases, Stevenson concluded that no normal explanation sufficed."

In some cases, a child in a "past life" case may have birthmarks or birth defects that in some way correspond to physical features of the "previous person" whose life the child seems to remember. Stevenson's Reincarnation and Biology: A Contribution to the Etiology of Birthmarks and Birth Defects (1997) examined two hundred cases of birth defects or birthmarks on children claiming past-life memories. These included children with malformed or missing fingers who said they recalled the lives of people who had lost fingers; a boy with birthmarks resembling entrance and exit wounds who said he recalled the life of someone who had been shot; and a child with a scar around her skull three centimetres wide who said she recalled the life of a man who had had skull surgery. In many of the cases, in Stevenson's view, the witness testimony or autopsy reports appeared to support the existence of the injuries on the deceased's body.

Stevenson was cautious about making any definite claims about reincarnation in his research, but felt his body of evidence demanded serious attention. In 1989, he said, "[T]he evidence is not flawless and it certainly does not compel such a belief. Even the best of it is open to alternative interpretations, [but] one can only censure those who say there is no evidence whatever."

== Reception ==
=== Criticism ===
The Journal of the American Medical Association referred to Stevenson's Cases of the Reincarnation Type (1975) as a "painstaking and unemotional" collection of cases that were "difficult to explain on any assumption other than reincarnation." In September 1977, the Journal of Nervous and Mental Disease devoted most of one issue to Stevenson's research. Writing in the journal, the psychiatrist Harold Lief described Stevenson as a methodical investigator and added, "Either he is making a colossal mistake, or he will be known (I have said as much to him) as 'the Galileo of the 20th century'." The issue proved popular: the journal's editor, the psychiatrist Eugene Brody, said he had received 300–400 requests for reprints.

Despite this early interest, most scientists ignored Stevenson's work. According to his New York Times obituary, his detractors saw him as "earnest, dogged but ultimately misguided, led astray by gullibility, wishful thinking and a tendency to see science where others saw superstition." Critics suggested that the children or their parents had deceived him, that he was too willing to believe them, and that he had asked them leading questions. Robert Todd Carroll wrote in his Skeptic's Dictionary that Stevenson's results were subject to confirmation bias, in that cases not supportive of the hypothesis were not presented as counting against it. Leonard Angel, a philosopher of religion, told The New York Times that Stevenson did not follow proper standards. "[B]ut you do have to look carefully to see it; that's why he's been very persuasive to many people."

In an article in Skeptical Inquirer Angel examined Stevenson's Twenty Cases Suggestive of Reincarnation (1974) and concluded that the research was so poorly conducted as to cast doubt on all Stevenson's work. He says that Stevenson failed to clearly and concisely document the claims made before attempting to verify them. Among a number of other faults, Angel says, Stevenson asked leading questions and did not properly tabulate or account for all erroneous statements. Angel writes:

"In sum, Stevenson does not skillfully record, present, or analyze his own data. If a case regarded by Stevenson to be among the strongest of his cases — the only case of 20 that had its purported verifications conducted by Stevenson himself — falls apart under scrutiny as badly as the Imad Elawar case does, it is reasonable to conclude that the other cases, in which data were first gathered by untrained observers, are even less reliable than this one."

Skeptics have written that Stevenson's evidence was anecdotal and by applying Occam's razor there are prosaic explanations for the cases without invoking the paranormal. Psychologist and neurologist Terence Hines has written:

"The major problem with Stevenson’s work is that the methods he used to investigate alleged cases of reincarnation are inadequate to rule out simple, imaginative storytelling on the part of the children claiming to be reincarnations of dead individuals. In the seemingly most impressive cases Stevenson (1975, 1977) has reported, the children claiming to be reincarnated knew friends and relatives of the dead individual. The children’s knowledge of facts about these individuals is, then, somewhat less than conclusive evidence for reincarnation."

Robert Baker wrote that many alleged past-life experiences can be explained in terms of known psychological factors. Baker attributed the recalling of past lives to a mixture of cryptomnesia and confabulation. British author and independent researcher Ian Wilson argued that a large number of Stevenson's cases consisted of poor children remembering wealthy lives or belonging to a higher caste. He speculated that such cases may represent a scheme to obtain money from the family of the alleged former incarnation.

The philosopher C.T.K. Chari of Madras Christian College in Chennai, a specialist in parapsychology, argued that Stevenson was naive and that the case studies were undermined by his lack of local knowledge. Chari wrote that many of the cases had come from societies, such as that of India, where people believed in reincarnation, and that the stories were simply cultural artifacts; he argued that, for children in many Asian countries, the recall of a past life is the equivalent of an imaginary playmate. The philosopher Keith Augustine made a similar argument.

Responding to this cultural argument, Stevenson said that it was precisely those societies that listened to children's claims about past lives, which in Europe or North America would normally be dismissed without investigation. To address the cultural concern, he wrote European Cases of the Reincarnation Type (2003), which presented forty cases he had examined in Europe. Moreover, Joseph Prabhu, professor emeritus of philosophy and religion at California State University, wrote that it is not true "that these cases are mainly to be found in cultures, where the belief in reincarnation is prevalent. In July 1974 Stevenson's colleague at the University of Virginia, J. G. Pratt, carried out a census of Stevenson's cases and found that of the 1339 cases then in Stevenson's file, 'the United States has the most, with 324 cases (not counting American Indian and Inuit) and the next five countries in descending order are Burma (139 cases), India (135), Turkey (114), and Great Britain (111).'"

The philosopher Paul Edwards, editor-in-chief of Macmillan's Encyclopedia of Philosophy, became Stevenson's chief critic. From 1986 onwards, he devoted several articles to Stevenson's work, and discussed Stevenson in his Reincarnation: A Critical Examination (1996). He argued that Stevenson's views were "absurd nonsense" and that when examined in detail his case studies had "big holes" and "do not even begin to add up to a significant counterweight to the initial presumption against reincarnation." Stevenson, Edwards wrote, "evidently lives in a cloud-cuckoo-land."

Champe Ransom, whom Stevenson hired as an assistant in the 1970s, wrote an unpublished report about Stevenson's work, which Edwards cites in his Immortality (1992) and Reincarnation (1996). According to Ransom, Edwards wrote, Stevenson asked the children leading questions, filled in gaps in the narrative, did not spend enough time interviewing them, and left too long a period between the claimed recall and the interview; it was often years after the first mention of a recall that Stevenson learned about it. In only eleven of the 1,111 cases Ransom looked at had there been no contact between the families of the deceased and of the child before the interview; in addition, according to Ransom, seven of those eleven cases were seriously flawed. He also wrote that there were problems with the way Stevenson presented the cases, in that he would report his witnesses' conclusions, rather than the data upon which the conclusions rested. Weaknesses in cases would be reported in a separate part of his books, rather than during the discussion of the cases themselves. Ransom concluded that it all amounted to anecdotal evidence of the weakest kind.

Edwards cited the case of Corliss Chotkin Jr., in Angoon, Alaska, described by Stevenson, as an example that relied entirely on the word of one woman, the niece of Victor Vincent, a fisherman. (Victor Vincent was the person whose life Corliss Chotkin Jr., seemed to remember.) Edwards wrote that, among the many weaknesses in the case, the family were religious believers in reincarnation, Chotkin had birthmarks that were said to have resembled scars that Vincent had but Stevenson had not seen Vincent's scars, and all the significant details relied on the niece. Edwards said that Stevenson offered no information about her, except that several people told him she had a tendency, as Stevenson put it, to embellish or invent stories. Edwards wrote that similar weaknesses could be found in all of Stevenson's case studies.

Edwards charged that Stevenson referred to himself as a scientist but did not act like one. According to Edwards, he failed to respond to, or even mention, significant objections; the large bibliography in Stevenson's Children Who Remember Previous Lives (1987) does not include one paper or book from his opponents.

Stevenson wrote an introduction to a book, Second Time Round (1975), in which Edward Ryall, an Englishman, told of what he believed to be his memories of a past life as John Fletcher, a man who was born in 1645 in Taunton, England, and died forty years later near his home in Westonzoyland, Somerset. Stevenson investigated the case and discovered that some of the historical features from Ryall's book were accurate. Stevenson wrote, "I think it most probable that he has memories of a real previous life and that he is indeed John Fletcher reborn, as he believes himself to be". In 1976, however, John Taylor discovered that none of the available church records at the Westonzoyland church from 1645 to 1685 had entries for births, marriages, or deaths for the name Fletcher. Since no trace of the name could be found, he concluded that no man called John Fletcher actually existed and that the supposed memories were a fantasy Ryall had developed over the years. Stevenson later altered his opinion about the case. In his book European Cases of the Reincarnation Type, he wrote, "I can no longer believe that all of Edward Ryall's apparent memories derive from a previous life, because some of his details are clearly wrong," but he still suggested that Ryall acquired some information about 17th-century Somerset by paranormal means.

=== Concessions from critics ===
Ian Wilson, one of Stevenson's critics, acknowledged that Stevenson had brought “a new professionalism to a hitherto crank-prone field.” Paul Edwards wrote that Stevenson “has written more fully and more intelligibly in defense of reincarnation than anybody else.” Though faulting Stevenson's judgment, Edwards wrote: “I have the highest regard for his honesty. All of his case reports contain items that can be made the basis of criticism. Stevenson could easily have suppressed this information. The fact that he did not speaks well for his integrity.”

Carl Sagan referred to what were apparently Stevenson's investigations in his book The Demon-Haunted World as an example of carefully collected empirical data, and though he rejected reincarnation as a parsimonious explanation for the stories, he wrote that the phenomenon of alleged past-life memories should be further researched.

=== Support ===
Remi J. Cadoret, wrote in The American Journal of Psychiatry that Stevenson's European Cases of the Reincarnation Type "provides an introduction to an exciting range of [unusual] phenomena and furnishes an inspiring example of a painstaking protocol to sift facts from fancy."

Lester S. King, pathologist, reviewed the first volume of Cases of the Reincarnation Type for the JAMA Journal. King wrote, "He may not convince skeptics, but he has placed on record a large amount of data that cannot be ignored."

== Xenoglossy ==
Although Stevenson mainly focused on cases of children who seemed to remember past lives, he also studied two cases in which adults under hypnosis seemed to remember a past life and show rudimentary use of a language they had not learned in the present life. Stevenson called this phenomenon "xenoglossy." The linguist Sarah Thomason, critiquing these cases, wrote that Stevenson is "unsophisticated about language" and that the cases are unconvincing. Thomason concluded, "the linguistic evidence is too weak to provide support for the claims of xenoglossy." William J. Samarin, a linguist from the University of Toronto, wrote that Stevenson corresponded with linguists in a selective and unprofessional manner. He said that Stevenson corresponded with one linguist in a period of six years "without raising any discussion about the kinds of thing that linguists would need to know." Another linguist, William Frawley, wrote, "Stevenson does not consider enough linguistic evidence in these cases to warrant his metaphysics."

== Retirement ==
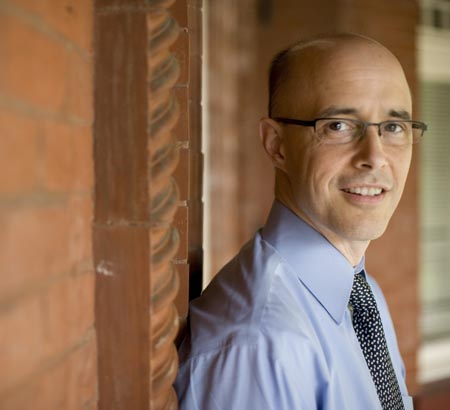
Child psychiatrist Jim Tucker continues Stevenson's work.

Stevenson stepped down as director of the Division of Perceptual Studies in 2002, although he continued to work as research professor of psychiatry. Bruce Greyson, editor of the Journal of Near-Death Studies, became director of the division. Jim Tucker, the department's associate professor of psychiatry and neurobehavioral sciences, continued Stevenson's research with children, examined in Tucker's book, Life Before Life: A Scientific Investigation of Children's Memories of Previous Lives (2005).

== Death and experiment ==
Stevenson died of pneumonia on February 8, 2007, at his home in Charlottesville, Virginia. In his will he endowed the Stevenson Chair in Philosophy and History of Science including Medicine, at McGill University Department of Social Studies of Medicine.

As one experiment to test for personal survival of bodily death, in the 1960s Stevenson set a combination lock using a secret word or phrase and placed it in a filing cabinet in the department, telling his colleagues he would try to pass the code to them after his death. Emily Williams Kelly told The New York Times: "Presumably, if someone had a vivid dream about him, in which there seemed to be a word or a phrase that kept being repeated—I don't quite know how it would work—if it seemed promising enough, we would try to open it using the combination suggested."

== Works ==
Books

- (1960). Medical History-Taking. Paul B. Hoeber.
- (1966). Twenty Cases Suggestive of Reincarnation. University of Virginia Press.
- (1969). The Psychiatric Examination. Little, Brown.
- (1970). Telepathic Impressions: A Review and Report of 35 New Cases. University Press of Virginia.
- (1971). The Diagnostic Interview (2nd revised edition of Medical History-Taking). Harper & Row.
- (1974). Twenty Cases Suggestive of Reincarnation (second revised and enlarged edition). University of Virginia Press.
- (1974). Xenoglossy: A Review and Report of A Case. University of Virginia Press.
- (1975). Cases of the Reincarnation Type, Vol. I: Ten Cases in India. University of Virginia Press.
- (1978). Cases of the Reincarnation Type, Vol. II: Ten Cases in Sri Lanka. University of Virginia Press.
- (1980). Cases of the Reincarnation Type, Vol. III: Twelve Cases in Lebanon and Turkey. University of Virginia Press.
- (1983). Cases of the Reincarnation Type, Vol. IV: Twelve Cases in Thailand and Burma. University of Virginia Press.
- (1984). Unlearned Language: New Studies in Xenoglossy. University of Virginia Press.
- (1987). Children Who Remember Previous Lives: A Question of Reincarnation. University of Virginia Press.
- (1997). Reincarnation and Biology: A Contribution to the Etiology of Birthmarks and Birth Defects. Volume 1: Birthmarks. Praeger Publishers.
- (1997). Reincarnation and Biology: A Contribution to the Etiology of Birthmarks and Birth Defects. Volume 2: Birth Defects and Other Anomalies. Praeger Publishers.
- (1997). Where Reincarnation and Biology Intersect. Praeger Publishers (a short, non-technical version of Reincarnation and Biology).
- (2000). Children Who Remember Previous Lives: A Question of Reincarnation (revised edition). McFarland Publishing.
- (2003). European Cases of the Reincarnation Type. McFarland & Company.
- (2019). Handbook of Psychiatry volume Five (Co-written with Javad Nurbakhsh and Hamideh Jahangiri). LAP LAMBERT Academic Publishing.
- (2020). Psychological Treatment Techniques For Social Anxiety Disorder (Co-written with Aliakbar Shoarinejad and Hamideh Jahangiri). Scholars' Press.

Selected articles

- (1949). "Why medicine is not a science", Harper's, April.
- (1952). "Illness from the inside", Harper's, March.
- (1952). "Why people change", Harper's, December.
- (1954). "Psychosomatic medicine, Part I", Harper's, July.
- (1954). "Psychosomatic medicine, Part II", Harper's, August.
- (1957). "Tranquilizers and the mind", Harper's, July.
- (1957). "Schizophrenia", Harper's, August.
- (1957). "Is the human personality more plastic in infancy and childhood?", American Journal of Psychiatry, 114(2), pp. 152–161.
- (1958). "Scientists with half-closed minds" Harper's, November.
- (1959). "A Proposal for Studying Rapport which Increases Extrasensory Perception," Journal of the American Society for Psychical Research, 53, pp. 66–68.
- (1959). "The Uncomfortable Facts about Extrasensory Perception", Harper's, July.
- (1960). "The Evidence for Survival from Claimed Memories of Former Incarnations," Journal of the American Society for Psychical Research, 54, pp. 51–71.
- (1960). "The Evidence for Survival from Claimed Memories of Former Incarnations": Part II. Analysis of the Data and Suggestions for Further Investigations, Journal of the American Society for Psychical Research, 54, pp. 95–117.
- (1961). "An Example Illustrating the Criteria and Characteristics of Precognitive Dreams," Journal of the American Society for Psychical Research, 55, pp. 98–103.
- (1964). "The Blue Orchid of Table Mountain," Journal of the Society for Psychical Research, 42, pp. 401–409.
- (1968). "The Combination Lock Test for Survival," Journal of the American Society for Psychical Research, 62, pp. 246–254.
- (1970). "Characteristics of Cases of the Reincarnation Type in Turkey and their Comparison with Cases in Two other Cultures," International Journal of Comparative Sociology, 11, pp. 1–17.
- (1970). "A Communicator Unknown to Medium and Sitters," Journal of the American Society for Psychical Research, 64, pp. 53–65.
- (1970). "Precognition of Disasters," Journal of the American Society for Psychical Research, 64, pp. 187–210.
- (1971). "The Substantiability of Spontaneous cases," Proceedings of the Parapsychological Association, No. 5, pp. 91–128.
- (1972). "Are Poltergeists Living or Are They Dead?," Journal of the American Society for Psychical Research, 66, pp. 233–252.
- (1977). Stevenson, IAN (May 1977). "The Explanatory Value of the Idea of Reincarnation". The Journal of Nervous and Mental Disease. 164 (5): 305–326. doi:10.1097/00005053-197705000-00002. PMID 864444. S2CID 30398311.
- (1983). Stevenson, I. (Dec 1983). "American children who claim to remember previous lives". The Journal of Nervous and Mental Disease. 171 (12): 742–748. doi:10.1097/00005053-198312000-00006. PMID 6644283. S2CID 12756019.
- (1986). Stevenson, I. (1986). "Characteristics of Cases of the Reincarnation Type among the Igbo of Nigeria". Journal of Asian and African Studies. 21 (3–4): 204–216. doi:10.1177/002190968602100305. S2CID 220926954.
- (1993). "Birthmarks and Birth Defects Corresponding to Wounds on Deceased Persons" (PDF). Journal of Scientific Exploration. 7 (4): 403–410. Archived from the original (PDF) on 2017-08-07.
- with Emily Williams Cook and Bruce Greyson (1998). "Do Any Near-Death Experiences Provide Evidence for the Survival of Human Personality after Relevant Features and Illustrative Case Reports" (PDF). Journal of Scientific Exploration. 12 (3): 377–406.
- (1999). Stevenson, I. (Apr 1999). "Past lives of twins". Lancet. 353 (9161): 1359–1360. doi:10.1016/S0140-6736(05)74353-1. PMID 10218554. S2CID 35390196.
- (2000). Stevenson, I. (Apr 2000). "The phenomenon of claimed memories of previous lives: possible interpretations and importance". Medical Hypotheses. 54 (4): 652–659. doi:10.1054/mehy.1999.0920. PMID 10859660. S2CID 15947669.
- (2000). Stevenson, I. (November 1, 2000). "The Belief in Reincarnation Among the Igbo of Nigeria". Journal of Asian and African Studies. 20 (1–2): 13–30. doi:10.1177/002190968502000102. S2CID 220926144. Archived from the original on 2012-11-04 – via HighBeam Research.
- (2001). Stevenson, I. (August 2001). "Ropelike birthmarks on children who claim to remember past lives". Psychological Reports. 89 (1): 142–144. doi:10.2466/pr0.2001.89.1.142. PMID 11729534. S2CID 17691019.
- with Satwant K. Pasricha; Jürgen Keil; and Jim B. Tucker (2005). "Some Bodily Malformations Attributed to Previous Lives" (PDF). Journal of Scientific Exploration. 19 (3): 159–183.
- (2005). Foreword and afterword in Mary Rose Barrington and Zofia Weaver. A World in a Grain of Sand: The Clairvoyance of Stefan Ossowiecki. McFarland Press.

An extended list of Stevenson's works is online.

== See also ==
Parapsychology

- Afterlife
- Near-death experience
- Richard Wiseman
- Xenoglossy

Philosophy

- Dualism (philosophy of mind)
- Explanatory gap
- Hard problem of consciousness
- Mind–body problem
- Mysterianism
- Qualia
