= Age regression =

Age regression commonly refers to:

- Age regression in hypnotherapy, a pseudoscientific technique
- Ageplay
- Regression (psychology), a defense mechanism in which one reverts to an earlier developmental state.
