= Harold Lief =

American psychiatrist and psychoanalyst

Harold I. Lief
- Born: 1917; Brooklyn, New York City, United States
- Died: 2007 (aged 89–90)
- Education: University of Michigan; New York University School of Medicine; Columbia University
- Occupations: psychiatrist, psychoanalyst
- Employer: University of Pennsylvania
- Known for: Advocacy of sex education; introduction of "inhibited sexual desire" in the DSM

Harold I. Lief (1917–2007) was an American psychiatrist and psychoanalyst. He was famous as an advocate of sex education. Lief is credited with the introduction in the DSM of the "inhibited sexual desire".

== Early life and education ==
Lief, who was born in Brooklyn, attended the University of Michigan and graduated from the New York University School of Medicine in 1942. Lief's psychoanalytic training was at Columbia University.

== Career ==
While a professor of psychiatry at the University of Pennsylvania, Lief started organizing the Center for the Study of Sex Education in Medicine In 1960. At the time, there were only three other medical schools with separate programs in sexology.
