= Past life regression =

Pseudoscientific claim that past lives can be remembered

Past life regression (PLR), Past life therapy (PLT), regression or memory regression is a method that uses hypnosis to recover what practitioners believe are memories of past lives or incarnations. The practice is widely considered discredited and unscientific by medical practitioners, and experts generally regard claims of recovered memories of past lives as fantasies or delusions or a type of confabulation. Past-life regression is typically undertaken either in pursuit of a spiritual experience, or in a psychotherapeutic setting. Most advocates loosely adhere to beliefs about reincarnation.

The technique used during past-life regression involves the subject answering a series of questions while hypnotized to reveal identity and events of alleged past lives, a method similar to that used in recovered memory therapy and one that, similarly, often misrepresents recovered memories as faithful recordings of previous events rather than constructed sets of recollections. The use of hypnosis and suggestive questions can tend to leave the subject particularly likely to hold distorted or false memories. The source of the memories is more likely cryptomnesia and confabulations that combine experiences, knowledge, imagination and suggestion or guidance from the hypnotist than recall of a previous existence. Once created, those memories are indistinguishable from memories based on events that occurred during the subject's life.

Investigations of memories reported during past-life regression have revealed that they contain historical inaccuracies which originate from common beliefs about history, modern popular culture, or books that discuss historical events. Experiments with subjects undergoing past-life regression indicate that a belief in reincarnation and suggestions by the hypnotist are the two most important factors regarding the contents of memories reported.

== History ==
=== Religion ===
In the 2nd century BC, the Hindu scholar Patañjali, in his Yoga Sutras, discussed the idea of the soul becoming burdened with an accumulation of impressions as part of the karma from previous lives. Patañjali called the process of past-life regression prati-prasava (literally "reverse birthing"), and saw it as addressing current problems through memories of past lives. Some types of yoga continue to use prati-prasav as a practice. In the religious mythology of China, the deity Meng Po, also known as the "Lady of Forgetfulness", prevents souls from remembering their past lives: she gives them the "Mi Hun Tang (literally "soul beguiling soup")" that erases all memories before they climb the wheel of reincarnation.

Past life regression can be found in Jainism. The seven truths of Jainism deal with the soul and its attachment to karma. The fourth truth, Bandha, tells that karma can stick to one's soul. The seventh truth, Moksha, tells that in order to be freed from the cycle of rebirth and death, one must separate karma from the soul. In order to find out what karma is attached to one's soul, practitioners participate in "Jati-Smaran", which is the practise of remembering past lives.

=== Modern era ===
The nineteenth century saw the rise of Spiritualism, involving séances and other techniques for contacting departed spirits. Allan Kardec (1804–1869) sought to codify the lessons obtained in a set of five books, the Spiritist Codification (theSpiritist Pentateuch, 1857–1868), including The Spirits Book (1857) and Heaven and Hell (1865). These books introduce concepts of how spirits evolve through a series of incarnations.

Madame Blavatsky (1831–1891), co-founder of the Theosophical Society, introduced the Sanskrit term Akasha, beginning in Isis Unveiled (1877) as a vague life force that was continuously redefined, always vaguely, in subsequent publications. Separately in Isis Unveiled, she referred to "indestructible tablets of the astral light" recording both the past and future of human thought and action.

These concepts were combined into a single idea: the Akashic records, espoused by Alfred Percy Sinnett in his book Esoteric Buddhism (1883). The idea that the "Akashic records" held past life data set the stage, whereby Western practitioners of the paranormal could sidestep the notion of forgetfulness that, in traditional teachings about reincarnation, had prevented memories of former lives from being accessed.

An early report for a human accessing past life information during a trance state comes from 1923, when Edgar Cayce, while answering questions posed by Arthur Lammers (publisher) in a trance state, spoke of Lammers' past lives and of reincarnation. The use of hypnosis for past life regressions is said to have been developed by A. R. (Asa Roy) Martin of Sharon, Pennsylvania, who published Researches in Reincarnation and Beyond in 1942.

Past life regression is widely rejected as a psychiatric treatment by clinical psychiatrists and psychologists. A 2006 survey found that a majority of a sample of doctoral level mental health professionals rated "Past Lives" therapy as "certainly discredited" as a treatment for mental or behavioral disorders.

According to psychologist Robert Baker, the belief in reincarnation is the main predictor that the patient will have a past life memory during past life therapy. One of the most notorious cases was that of an American woman who remembered being Bridey Murphy and sang old Irish songs; when the case was investigated, it was shown that she did not remember a past life but her childhood instead. In the 1952 Bridey Murphy case, housewife Virginia Tighe of Pueblo, Colorado was reported by the hypnotist to have, under hypnosis, recounted memories of a 19th-century Irish woman ("Bridey Murphy"). The book The Search for Bridey Murphy details this story.

== Technique ==
In Eastern culture, past-life regression practitioners use hypnosis and suggestion to promote recall in their patients, using a series of questions designed to elicit statements and memories about the past life's history and identity. Some practitioners also use bridging techniques from a client's current-life problem to bring "past-life stories" to conscious awareness. Practitioners believe that unresolved issues from alleged past lives may be the cause of their patients' problems.

One technique for accessing memories from a past life is detailed in a study by Nicholas P. Spanos from Carleton University, Ontario, Canada. Subjects of a study were at first told that they would be undergoing a hypnosis, and afterwards told, "You are now in a different life, living in another life that you have lived before in another time. You are now reliving that other life that you lived once before in a different time." Next, after the administer asks: "What name can I call you by? I want you to look down and tell me what you are wearing. Describe everything you are wearing in detail. Where are you?"

Afterwards, the subjects were to chronicle the information that they could remember after regression in a past life. Past life regression can be achieved in as little as 15 minutes, but to recall past a point of death, and into "soul memories", it takes upwards of 45 minutes of trance induction. However, with psychotherapy clients who believe in past lives, irrespective of whether or not past lives exist, the use of past lives as a tool has been suggested.

== Sources of memories ==
The "memories" recovered by techniques like past-life regression may be the result of cryptomnesia: narratives created by the subconscious mind using imagination, forgotten information and suggestions from the therapist. Memories created under hypnosis are indistinguishable from actual memories and can be more vivid than factual memories. The greatest predictor of individuals reporting memories of past lives appears to be their beliefs—individuals who believe in reincarnation are more likely to report such memories, while skeptics or disbelievers are less so.

Examinations of three cases of apparent past life regression (Bridey Murphy, Jane Evans, and an unnamed English woman) revealed memories that were superficially convincing. However, investigation by experts in the languages used and historical periods described revealed flaws in all three patients' recall. The evidence included speech patterns that were "...used by movie makers and writers to convey the flavour of 16th century English speech" rather than actual Renaissance English. Another cited a historical date that was inaccurate, but was the same as a recognized printing error in historical pamphlets.

Another subject reported historically accurate information from the Roman era, that was identical to information found in a 1947 novel set in the same time as the individual's memories, with the same name reported by the person regressed. Other details cited are common knowledge and not evidence of the factual nature of the memories. Subjects asked to provide historical information that would allow checking, provided only vague responses that did not allow for verification, and sometimes were unable to provide critical details that would have been common knowledge. For example, a subject described the life of a Japanese fighter pilot during World War II, but was unable to identify Hirohito as the Emperor of Japan during the 1940s.

== Studies ==
Studies suggest that past lives are likely false memories, implanted through the susceptibility of the hypnotic method. A 1976 study, found that 40% of hypnotizable subjects described new identities and used different names when given a suggestion to regress past their birth. In the 1990s, a series of experiments undertaken by Nicholas Spanos examined the nature of past life memories. Descriptions of alleged past lives were found to be extremely elaborate, with vivid, detailed descriptions. This, however, is not indicative of the validity of this therapeutic method. Subjects who reported memories of past lives exhibited high hypnotizability, and patients demonstrated that the expectations conveyed by the experimenter were most important in determining the characteristics of the reported memories.

The degree to which the memories were considered credible by the experimental subjects was correlated most significantly with the subjects' beliefs about reincarnation and their expectation to remember a past life rather than hypnotizability. Spanos' research leads him to the conclusion that past lives are not memories, but actually social constructions based on patients acting "as if" they were someone else, but with significant flaws that would not be expected of actual memories. To create these memories, Spanos' subjects drew upon the expectations established by authority figures and information outside of the experiment, such as television, novels, life experiences, and their own desires. In sum, it is therefore suggested that past lives are likely false memories, implanted through the susceptibility of the hypnotic method.

== Ethical questions ==
Past life regression has been critiqued for being unethical on the premises that it lacks any evidence to support these claims, and that the act increases one's susceptibility to false memories. Luis Cordón states that this can be problematic as it creates delusions under the guise of therapy. The memories are experienced as vivid as those based on events experienced in one's life, impossible to differentiate from true memories of actual events, and accordingly any damage can be difficult to undo.

As past life regression is rooted on the premise of reincarnation, many APA accredited organizations have begun to refute this as a therapeutic method on the basis of it being unethical. Additionally, the hypnotic methodology that underpins past life regression places the participant in a vulnerable position, susceptible to implantation of false memories. Because the implantation of false memories may be harmful, Gabriel Andrade points out that past life regression violates the principle of first, do no harm (non-maleficence).

== Works ==
- Children's Past Lives by Carol Bowman
- Reliving Past Lives by Helen Wambach
- Destiny of Souls by Michael Newton
- Raaz Pichhle Janam Ka, Indian TV series

== See also ==
- Age regression in therapy
- Ericksonian hypnosis
- Reincarnation research
- Repressed memory
- Retrocognition
