= Satwant Pasricha =

Indian academic

- Known for: Reincarnation research, Near-death experience research
- Scientific career
- Fields: Clinical Psychology
- Workplaces: NIMHANS

Satwant Pasricha was the head of Department of Clinical Psychology at NIMHANS, National Institute of Mental Health and Neurosciences at Bangalore. She also worked for a time at the University of Virginia School of Medicine in the USA. Pasricha investigates reincarnation and near-death experiences. Pasricha co-authored the 2011 book Making sense of near-death experiences, which was Highly Commended in the Psychiatry category at the 2012 British Medical Association Book Awards.

== Work ==
Pasricha has investigated and participated in about 500 cases of reincarnation involving children (referred to as subjects) since 1973 who claim to remember previous lives. She became interested in working in parapsychology because she was not satisfied with the conventional explanations of certain paranormal or unusual behavior.

Pasricha studies not just the characteristics of reincarnation prevalent in India, but also suggests ways they are similar or different from those of people in other countries. She collaborated with Ian Stevenson in reincarnation research beginning in the 1970s.

She joined NIMHANS (Deemed University) as a faculty in December 1980 as a lecturer in Clinical Parapsychology; and then was promoted to assistant professor, associate professor and additional professor of clinical psychology. She is also involved in clinical work such as patient care and teaching and research in the areas of her interest at NIMHANS.

Satwant Pasricha of the Maulana Azad Medical College appreciates her work on the subject, but he also places not-verifiable truth like "rebirth" and “reincarnation” out of the domain of the scientific knowledge. Many other scientists label them as a hallucinatory experience and as "a physiological state occurring within an oxygen starved brain."

== Selected publications ==
- Satwant Pasricha, Can the Mind Survive Beyond Death? In Pursuit of Scientific Evidence (2 Vol.), New Delhi: Harman Publishing House, 2008. ISBN 81-86622-93-4.
- Satwant Pasricha, Claims of Reincarnation: An Empirical Study of Cases in India, New Delhi: Harman Publishing House, 1990. ISBN 81-85151-27-X.
- Satwant Pasricha, Near-Death Experiences in South India: A Systematic Survey. Journal of Scientific Exploration, 9(1), 1995.
- Ian Stevenson, Satwant Pasricha and Nicholas McClean-Rice, A Case of the Possession Type in India With Evidence of Paranormal Knowledge. Journal of Scientific Exploration, 3(1):81-101, 1989.

== See also ==
- Bruce Greyson
- International Association for Near-Death Studies
- Near-death studies
- Life After Life (Moody book)
- Pam Reynolds case
- Ian Stevenson
