= Destiny of Souls =

2000 book by Michael Newton

- Author: Michael Newton
- Language: English
- Genre: past-life regression, spiritual regression
- Publisher: Llewellyn Publications, USA
- Publication date: May 2000
- Publication place: United States
- Media type: Print (Paperback)
- Preceded by: Journey of Souls

Destiny of Souls is a book by Michael Newton (9 December 1931 – 22 September 2016), published in 2000. Newton was a hypnotherapist who claimed to have developed his own age regression technique, bringing subjects to the between-life state. He called this "spiritual regression," and wrote that it required a deeper trance than past-life regression. The Michael Newton Institute for Life Between Lives Hypnotherapy is a non-profit organization formed in 2002. The institute was set up to train qualified hypnotherapists to continue Newton's work on past lives and spiritual realms.

== Summary ==
Through what he calls research into the afterlife, Newton claims to have documented the results of his clinical work in spiritual hypnotherapy. These are presented in a form of case studies and Newton asserts that they uncover the hidden aspects of the spirit world. Destiny of Souls is a sequel to his first book, titled Journey of Souls (1994).

== Reception ==
Publishers Weekly in their review said that this book was "a rich volume, chock-full of interviews and fascinating first-person narratives, this book is nonetheless not for the uninitiated; Newton sometimes fails to explain his terminology, so readers who do not know much about "lives between lives" may feel lost. More informed readers, however, will find this a feast, and Newton a charming host." Destiny of Souls won the Independent Publisher Book Award in 2001 in the New Age category, one of 49 categories of this annual award.
