= Carol Bowman =

American writer (born 1950)

Carol Bowman MS
- Born: October 14, 1950 (age 75)
- Citizenship: United States
- Education: Villanova University
- Alma mater: Simmons College, Boston
- Occupations: Author, lecturer, counselor, and therapist
- Writing career
- Period: 1997-
- Subject: Reincarnation
- Notable works: Children's Past Lives, Return from Heaven
- Website: www.carolbowman.com

Carol Bowman M.S. (born October 14, 1950) is an author, lecturer, counselor, and therapist, known for her work in studying alleged cases of reincarnation, especially those involving young children, and especially the healing potential of remembering past lives.

== Biography ==
Her first two books, Children's Past Lives (Bantam, 1997) and Return from Heaven (HarperCollins, 2001), about reincarnation, have been published in more than twenty three languages. Bowman has also been a practicing past life regression therapist for adults for more than twenty-five years and conducts training courses to teach practicing therapists her method of past life regression therapy. She studied with pioneers Morris Netherton and Roger Woolger in the field of past life regression, and holds an M.S. in counseling from Villanova University, after graduating from Simmons College in Boston.

She has appeared on many TV and radio programs, including Oprah, Good Morning America, Unsolved Mysteries, ABC Primetime, "The Katie Couric Show", and The Art Bell Show, as well as shows on A&E, Discovery Channel and the BBC. She has lectured in Norway, Belgium, Spain, Ireland, and the Netherlands, and has spoken at the Omega Institute and for the Edgar Cayce Foundation.

Bowman's book Children's Past Lives received a positive review from Publishers Weekly and was recommended to readers of the new age community. Her second book, Return to Heaven, examined the phenomenon of what Bowman called "family return"—reincarnation back into the same family.

== See also ==
- Ian Stevenson
- Reincarnation
- Past-life regression
