= The Journal of Nervous and Mental Disease =

- Discipline: Neuropsychiatry
- Language: English
- Edited by: Kimberly Yonkers

Publication details
- History: 1874–present
- Publisher: Lippincott Williams & Wilkins
- Impact factor: 1.5 (2025)

Standard abbreviations
- ISO 4: J. Nerv. Ment. Dis.

Indexing
- ISSN: 0022-3018
- OCLC no.: 1754691

Links
- Journal homepage; Online access; Online archive

The Journal of Nervous and Mental Disease is a peer-reviewed medical journal on psychopathology. It was established in 1874 as the Chicago Journal of Nervous and Mental Disease. "Chicago" was dropped from the title beginning in 1876. Articles cover theory, etiology, therapy, and social impact of illness, and research methods.

== Editors-in-chief ==
The following people have been editors-in-chief of this journal:

- 1874–1881: James Stewart Jewell
- 1882–1885: William J. Morton
- 1886–1887: Bernard Sachs
- 1888–1889: Charles Henry Brown
- 1889–1890: G. M. Hammond
- 1890–1901: C. H. Brown
- 1902–1944: Smith Ely Jelliffe
- 1945–1957: N. D. C. Lewis
- 1958–1959: J. E. Finesinger
- 1961–1967: L. S. Kubie
- 1967–2010: Eugene B. Brody
- 2011–2023: John A. Talbott
- 2023–present: Kimberly Yonkers

== See also ==
- List of psychiatry journals
