= Jim B. Tucker =

American parapsychologist

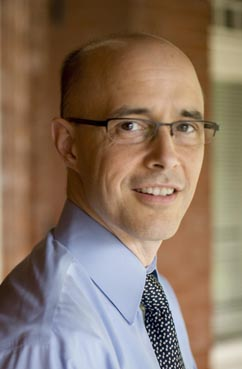
- Born: North Carolina, US
- Education: University of North Carolina-Chapel Hill, University of Virginia
- Occupations: Bonner-Lowry Professor of Psychiatry and Neurobehavioral Sciences (Retired)
- Writing career
- Genres: Parapsychology; Child psychiatry
- Subject: Reincarnation research

Jim B. Tucker is a retired child psychiatrist and former Bonner-Lowry Professor of Psychiatry and Neurobehavioral Sciences at the University of Virginia School of Medicine. His main research interests were documenting stories of children who, he has claimed, remember previous lives, and natal and prenatal memories. He is the author of Life Before Life: A Scientific Investigation of Children’s Memories of Previous Lives, which presents an overview of over four decades of reincarnation research at the Division of Perceptual Studies. Tucker worked for several years on this research with Ian Stevenson before taking over upon Stevenson's retirement in 2002.

In addition to his publications Tucker has appeared in broadcast media talking about his work. His investigation of the case of Cameron Macaulay was featured in the British TV network, "Channel 5", documentary Extraordinary People - The Boy Who Lived Before.

== Biography ==
Tucker attended the University of North Carolina at Chapel Hill, where he graduated Phi Beta Kappa with a B.A. Degree in psychology and a medical degree. He is currently Bonner-Lowry Professor of Psychiatry and Neurobehavioral Sciences, and in addition to conducting research, he was the medical director of the University of Virginia Child & Family Psychiatry Clinic for nine years.

He lives in Charlottesville, Virginia, with his wife, Christine McDowell Tucker, a clinical psychologist, and has presented at academic and public conferences. Tucker felt unfulfilled by his work in child psychiatry, but was open to the possibility that humans are more than their material bodies and wished to investigate the matter further. Though raised as a Southern Baptist, Tucker does not subscribe to any particular religion, and claims to be skeptical about reincarnation, but sees it as providing the best explanation for phenomena associated with the strongest cases investigated to date. After reading Ian Stevenson's work, Tucker became intrigued by children's reported past-life memories and by the prospect of studying them.

== Reincarnation research ==
While researching reincarnation, Tucker has focused on children in the United States.

Tucker reports that in about 70% of the cases of children claiming to remember past lives, the deceased died from an unnatural cause, suggesting that traumatic death may be linked to the hypothesized survival of self. He further indicates that the time between death and apparent rebirth is, on average, sixteen months, and that unusual birth-marks might match fatal wounds suffered by the deceased.

Tucker has developed the Strength Of Case Scale (S.O.C.S.), which evaluates what Tucker sees as four aspects of potential cases of reincarnation; "(1) whether it involves birthmarks/defects that correspond to the supposed previous life; (2) the strength of the statements about the previous life; (3) the relevant behaviors as they relate to the previous life; and (4) an evaluation of the possibility of a connection between the child reporting a previous life and the supposed previous life".

Critics have argued there is no material explanation for the survival of self, but Tucker suggests that quantum mechanics may offer a mechanism by which memories and emotions could carry over from one life to another. This suggestion has been rejected by physicists.

Per The New York Times, he "has few kind words for regression therapy or its practitioners, he continues to be committed to the scientific study of what can only be called reincarnation." He says "“There can be something that survives after the death of the brain and the death of the body that is somehow connected to a new child,” he said. “I have become convinced that there is more to the world than the physical universe. There’s the mind piece, which is its own entity.”

== Media coverage ==
Since taking over the research into claimed past-life memories from Stevenson in 2002, Tucker has been interviewed about reincarnation in print and broadcast media in the United States, United Kingdom and Canada.

In 2006, Tucker investigated the case of Cameron Macaulay as part of the Channel 5 Documentary Extraordinary People: The Boy Who Lived Before. Tucker's investigation took him firstly to Glasgow to interview the six-year-old boy and his mother Norma about Cameron's reported recollections of life on the isle of Barra in the Outer Hebrides, around two hundred miles from the family's home in Glasgow. Tucker then accompanied the family as they traveled to Barra in an attempt to verify Cameron's statements about life on the island. Cameron's descriptions of his previous family home were entirely accurate; while the family name of "Robertson" also rang true, nothing could be found of the man Cameron recalled as his father on the island.

The documentary also briefly covered another of Tucker's cases: that of Gus Taylor from the Midwest U.S., who claimed from around the age of a year and a half to be his own grandfather returned to the family. In addition to speaking of a previous life, Tucker notes that both boys speak of falling through a 'hole' or ‘porthole’ from one life to the next. In 2009, he was interviewed on Larry King Live about the cases he has studied.

In 2024, the Washington Post published a story detailing Tucker's investigation of Ryan Hammons, an Oklahoma boy who, at the age of five, began describing memories of a past life in Hollywood, including having three sons, driving a green car, and working in the film industry. Tucker says that the memories are those of Marty Martyn, a movie extra and talent agent who died in 1964. The story was featured on the A&E series “The Unexplained,” in 2010. The story was criticized by neurologist Steven Novella as typical of credulous media reporting on paranormal subjects, noting that such pieces "focus on believers." According to Novella, the story concentrated on "regurgitating the same old arguments and evidence that has already been picked over by skeptics."

== See also ==
- Ian Stevenson
