= Thomas Everitt =

Mr and Mrs Thomas Everitt
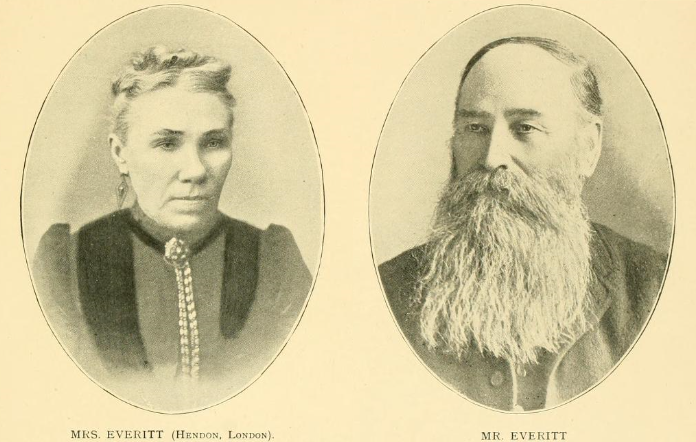
- Born: 1825, 1823
- Died: 1915, 1905
- Occupation: Spiritualists

Thomas Everitt (1823–1905) and Mrs Thomas Everitt (1825–1915) were prominent British spiritualists.

== Biography ==
Thomas Everitt was a successful tailor living in Pentonville with his wife. Mrs Everitt operated as a private medium and gave séances beginning in 1855. She was alleged to have produced automatic writing, direct voice mediumship and physical phenomena such as the movement of objects. Descriptions of her séances were published in Morell Theabold's book Spirit Workers in the Home Circle (1887). However, as she operated as a private medium she was not scientifically tested by researchers. For example, a sitter Edward Trusted Bennett from the Society for Psychical Research noted that "the seances at Mr. Everitt's were conducted in an exclusively religious tone, and afforded no opportunity for obtaining scientific evidence."

According to their spiritualist friend Samuel Carter Hall, Everitt and his wife were committed Christians and members of a non-conformist church. After retiring from his job, Everitt and his wife worked as teachers at a Sunday school. Mrs Everitt has been described as one of the earliest British spiritualist mediums and the first medium in 1867 to practice 'direct-voice' mediumship. Frank Podmore noted that there were suspicions of trickery about Mrs Everitt but she had managed to impress many of her séance sitters.

Thomas Everitt with Edmund Dawson Rogers and others, formed the British National Association of Spiritualists (BNAS) in January 1873. Everitt and his wife had supported the Spiritualist Association of Great Britain (SAGB). He was the president of the SAGB from 1880 to 1905. He died on 5 August 1905.

In her later years, Mrs Everitt practiced psychometry.

== Gallery ==
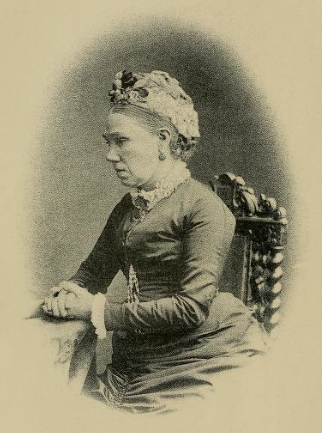
Mrs Thomas Everitt

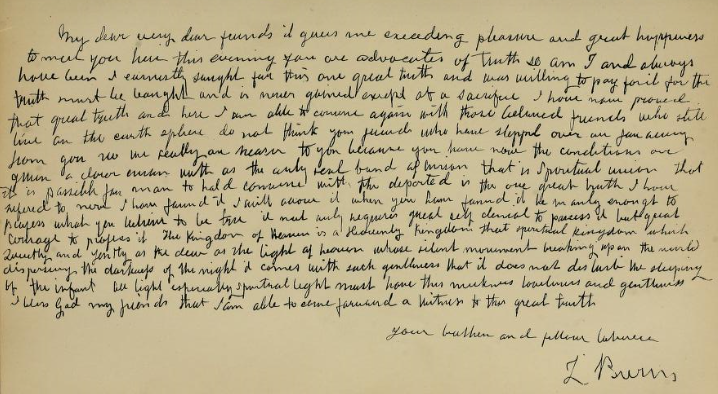
Example of Mrs Thomas Everitt's automatic handwriting

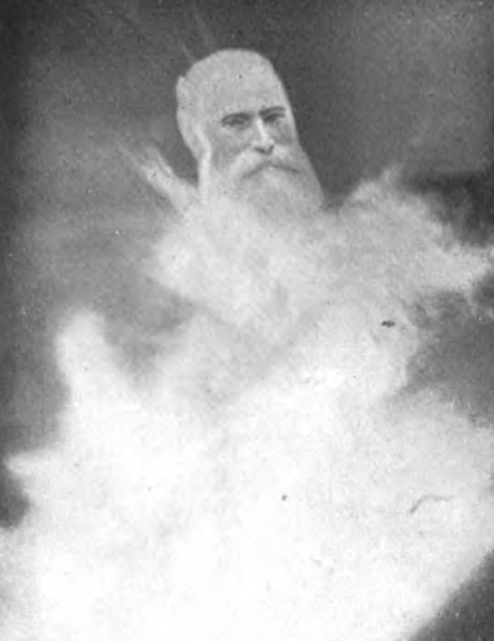
Alleged spirit photograph of Thomas Everitt

== See also ==
- John Stephen Farmer
- William Stainton Moses
