= Spiritism (book) =

1885 book by Eduard von Hartmann

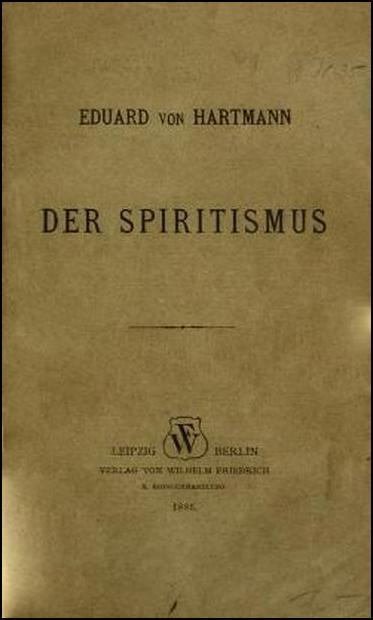
- 1st edition, 1885
- Author: Eduard von Hartmann
- Original title: Der Spiritismus
- Translator: Charles Massey
- Language: German
- Subject: Spiritualism
- Publisher: Wilhelm Friedrich
- Publication date: 1885
- Publication place: Germany
- English publication date: 1885
- Pages: 118
- OCLC: 964123554

Spiritism (German: Der Spiritismus) is an 1885 book by German philosopher Eduard von Hartmann, the author of the famous treatise Philosophy of the Unconscious. In professor Corinna Treitel's opinion, publication of this book became one of the "key events" in history of the "German occult movement." This book was "one of the first works to attempt a complete psychological explanation of all occult phenomena." According to Charles Massey, one of the founders of the Society for Psychical Research, publication of this book made the "most brutal blow" out of all ones that were ever directed against Spiritualism. (Note: Charles Massey, English translator of the book, noted that the philosophical position of its author is incompatible with Spiritualism because, in Hartmann's opinion, belief in the "personal immortality" is a delusion. According to the conclusion of the German philosopher Karl Du Prel, this "small work" by Hartmann was clearly directed against Spiritualism.)

== Contents of the book ==
1. The general state of the question.
2. The physical phenomena.
3. The ideality of the manifestations.
4. Transfigurations and materialisations.
5. The spirit hypothesis.

=== Spiritism and Spiritualism ===
At the beginning of the first chapter Hartmann explains that "the word 'Spiritism' is of French production", but the English and most part of the Germans prefer the term "Spiritualism". The author presents to use the term "Spiritualism" to denote the metaphysical point of view, which is the opposite of materialism, and the explanation of mediumistic phenomena through participation of "spirits", he offers to call by the term "Spiritism". (Note: "Spiritualism is a religion based upon the belief that mediumship, the ability demonstrated by a few select persons to contact the world of spirits, proves that the individual survives bodily death. It arose in midnineteenth-century America and has spread around the world.") He believes that most people, who are aspiring for Spiritism and read Spiritist journals, have no interest in a scientific study of the phenomena of mediumship, but instead seek "the confirmation of their belief in immortality". (Note: History of "table-turning" in Germany began "in January 1853 when a woman in Bremen" received from New York a letter by her brother in which he, having reported on his successful spiritualistic experiments, suggested to her to conduct hers own experiments, in accordance with the detailed instructions attached to the letter. A few days later, in the salon belonging to the Bremen businessman, one of the first spiritualistic séances in Europe was held.) Hartmann considers a reopening of the huge field of phenomena, that were rejected in the Age of Enlightenment, as a great merit of the modern spiritistic movement. However, in his opinion, Spiritism threatens to become a public disaster in Germany, therefore the state should use its authority in order to interest scientists in a study of the spiritistic phenomena. He writes that the public has the complete right to know about these things, and since it is not able to formulate its own opinion, it only remains to wait for the conclusions drawn by the official representatives of science. (Note: Nicholas Goodrick-Clarke stated that, in accordance with the Hartmann philosophy, "the ego survives death as a discarnate entity against a background of... Christian theology, and spiritualist speculations.") (Note: Frank Podmore wrote that the immature views of the first American Spiritualists were "transmuted and elaborated by European, and especially by German thinkers [including Hartmann]", who have led the phenomena into rank of scientific facts "by postulating new forces or new extensions of familiar forces, resident in the human organism, rather than to be content with adopting an explanation which is practically the negation of all explanations—the operations of spirits.")

=== Research methodology ===
Hartmann writes that in order to study the "abnormal phenomena of human nature" it is necessary to appeal to persons who are endowed with an abnormal organism. It should be remembered, he continues, that just as in "experiments with an electrical friction machine", there may be failures in experiments with mediums, but this should not prevent the "investigation of abnormal phenomena." He believes that the scientific study of spiritism should be based on "general methodological axioms" which can not be "transgressed with impunity."

"First, principles are not to be multiplied without necessity; thus a second sort of causes are not to be supposed, as long as a single sort will suffice. Secondly, we should as long as possible abide by causes whose existence is guaranteed by experience or indubitable inference, and should not unnecessarily catch at causes of doubtful or unproven existence, such as are to be first established by their value as hypothesis for the explanation of phenomena in question. Thirdly, we should as long as possible try to do with natural causes and not touch supernatural ones without urgent necessity. Against these three axioms Spiritism offends."

=== Hypothesis of hallucinations ===
The study of "masked somnambulism," as Hartmann argues, can give an understanding of the "whole area" of mediumistic phenomena. (Note: "Somnambulism, a state of sleep, or half-waking trance, spontaneously or artificially induced in which subconscious faculties take the place of normal consciousness and direct the body in the performance of erratic (sleep walking) or highly intellectual actions (solving problems).") (Note: According to Massey, facts of somnambulism in respect to mediumistic phenomena "have certainly been too much neglected by Spiritualists." Du Prel wrote that somnambulism is "the most convincing proof" of the existence of supersensible world, since it shows that subconsciously "we have intertwined" with this transcendental world. Somnambulism proves that "Schopenhauer and Hartmann were right," when they asserted that the will and the unconscious compose basis for the phenomenon of man.) He explains that a "universal medium must be more than autosomnambule; he must be at the same time a powerful magnetiser." In his opinion, on a spiritistic séance medium plunges itself into a state of "masked or open somnambulism." Further, such a medium-autosomnambule has hallucinations, considered by him for reality, and at the same time, he possesses a strong desire that those present should see this imaginary reality, i.e. would have the same hallucinatory ideas as he himself.

Hartmann believes that "from the scientific psychological standpoint" every participator of mediumistic séance must constantly think on himself that he is under the influence of a very powerful mesmerist who aims to immerse him in masked somnambulism and thus taint him with his hallucinations. (Note: Hartmann explains mediumistic phenomena "psychologically in terms of hidden mental powers." He argues that medium is "a powerful mesmerist, capable of... creating a shared hallucination.")

"The mediums in their state of masked or open somnambulism have a size of nerve force, be it self-produced or extracted and accumulated by those present, as no magnetiser in his waking state has made it unfold, so surely theirs ability must with the help of this superior quantity of force to put those present in a state of open or masked somnambulism, greater than that of any magnetiser acting in the awake state." (Note: According to Hartmann, the existence of a "mediumistic nerve force", which, he writes, is "mistakenly" called a psychic one, is a fact.)

Original text (in German)
Die Medien in ihrem larvirten oder offenen Somnambulismus über ein Maass von Nervenkraft, sei es selbstproducirter, sei es von den Anwesenden extrahirter und angesammelter, verfügen, wie noch kein Magnetiseur im ganz wachen Zustand es zur Entfaltung gebracht hat, so gewiss muss auch ihre Fähigkeit, mit Hilfe dieses überlegenen Kraftquantums die Anwesenden in einen Zustand von offenem oder larvirtem Somnambulismus zu versetzen, grösser sein als die irgend eines im wachen Zustand agirenden Magnetiseurs.

According to Hartmann, the waking will of the medium in the somnambulic state fulfills the function of a magnetiser, giving the somnambulic consciousness a certain direction in relation to emerging hallucinations. If a medium "has the hallucination" of no longer being itself but of being the "spirit of Katie King," for example, and of appearing as such, the hallucination will also be transmitted to the recipients, that the medium who emerges from the curtain really is "Katie King." He believes that materialisation is most often just a transfiguration of medium himself, (Note: "Transfiguration, metamorphic power of the medium to assume bodily characteristics of deceased people for their representation.") because when the phantom was separating from the medium it always appeared that it was completely coming from the medium and returning to him. (Note: Hartmann tries to refer to "cases of hallucination-transference" that took place among "Indian fakirs and Turkish dervishes," however, according to Ramacharaka, although the images materialized "from the air" by fakirs are similar to those that are observed in spiritualistic séances, "there is really no connection between the two classes of phenomena.")

The hallucinatory hypothesis by Hartmann rejects the possibility of obtaining photographs on which both the medium and the materialised figure would be simultaneously placed, since hallucination can not be photographed, thus, in the opinion of its author, all such photographs are fake. For example, about a photograph taken by William Crookes, on which can be seen the medium simultaneously with the phantom, Hartmann writes that it is exposed to the strong suspicion that "instead of the supposed phantom the medium, and instead of the supposed medium the dress of the medium, stuffed with a cushion in a half-concealed position, have been photographed." (Note: Helena Blavatsky wrote: "Man can create. Given a certain intensity of will, and the shapes created by the mind become subjective. Hallucinations, they are called, although to their creator they are real as any visible object is to any one else. Given a more intense and intelligent concentration of this will, and the form becomes concrete, visible, objective.")

=== Hypothesis of nerve force ===
According to Hartmann, any physical phenomena of mediumship, regardless of their complexity, are always fulfilled due to "mediumistic nerve force," which is nothing else than a physical force that is "produced" by medium's nervous system and passes unhindered through any substance, "like magnetism." (Note: "Hartmann explained the physical phenomena as due to some force analogous to electricity or magnetism emanating from the medium's body.") The medium's will must direct this force and control the one, and the distribution of the one depends on the "fantastic image that is in the somnambulistic conscious of the medium." In addition, physical phenomena that require "a special strain of nerve force" are occurring when mediums sink into "an open somnambulism." The author confirms that the imprints of organic forms belong to "the most striking phenomena" of mediumship—they had been surpassed only cases of "matter's penetration through matter." He admits that the imprints undoubtedly prove that in this case there is no transfer of hallucinations but "an objective-real impact of mediumistic force on matter," and explains this phenomenon as follows:

"If we imagine another arrangement of the pressure and tension lines of the mediumistic nerve force—an arrangement corresponding to those pressures that are produced by inner side of the flat laying hand on a soft substance capable of perceiving the imprint, then the movement of the particles of matter caused by such a dynamical system should again be consistent with that, which is caused by direct pressure of the hand, i.e. imprint of an organic form would have been obtained, although such a form, capable of producing such imprint, might not has been in material kind." (Note: This passage of the philosopher was commented by Aksakov as follows, "This explanation contains a number of impossibilities from the point of view of physics.")

Original text (in German)
Denkt man sich eine andre Anordung der Druck- und Zuglinien der mediumistischen Nervenkraft, entsprechend denjenigen Druckverhältnissen, welche die Innenseite einer flach ausgestreckten Hand auf einen eindrucksfähigen Stoff hervorbringt, so müsste die Verschiebung der Stofftheilchen, welche durch ein solches dynamisches System hervorgebracht würde, wiederum mit der durch den Druck der Hand hervorgebrachten übereinstimmen, d. h. den Abdruck einer organischen Form zeigen, ohne dass eine organische Form in materieller Gestalt vorhanden gewesen wäre, welche diesen Abdruck hervorgebracht hätte.

Some of the phenomena Hartmann explains by the fact that medium in a state of somnambulism allegedly combines "the hallucination of the emerging image" with the idea on the need to move a real object and unconsciously produces this displacement "with the help of his mediumistic nerve force," while remaining confident that it was performed by own force of the fantastic image that has appeared by him, that is, through the "transfer of his hallucination to the audience," he unconsciously inspires them with the idea that the displacement that occurred really was fulfilled by that ghost which is just his hallucination. (Note: Aksakov commented, "So, we have here a hallucination with additive of the nerve force.") (Note: Ramacharaka wrote that many of the so-called spiritistic phenomena are actually produced by "the unconscious astral projection of medium," and not by incorporeal beings, staying on other planes of existence.)

=== Mental manifestations ===
Regarding spiritistic messages, Hartmann argues that only "the somnambulistic consciousness" can be the source of their content. He writes, "All messages have a content corresponding to the mental level and views of the medium." As a rule, this level happens to be "below the spiritual level" of the medium and participants of the séance, less often it equals, but it happens to be never higher.

The author writes that some mediums, with their "mimic transfigurations", exhibit striking linguistic abilities. They can reproduce words and phrases "in strange, incomprehensible dialects", which they had previously accidentally heard without paying attention to this. According to Hartmann, only a medium, who can write, can "produce automatic writing or perform writing at a distance [without the involvement of the hand]." (Note: However, Aksakov discovered "in the annals of spiritualism" several cases of mediumship of babies, associated with automatic writing.)

=== Explanation of paranormal ===
In principle, Hartmann admits the possibility of a mediumistic phenomenon of "the penetration of matter", as well as allows for the possibility of all other phenomena confirmed by the testimony of witnesses. However, he opposes the hypothesis by German astronomer Zöllner about the fourth dimension of space, preferring, rather, the statement "on the molecular shakes of material bonds in the body, than the one on movements and vibrations outside of three-dimensional space." (Note: Zöllner never admitted that spiritistic phenomena are produced by the spirits of dead people, but he connected them with the actions of some "mysterious beings" controlling the fourth dimension of space.) According to Hartmann, neither the sack nor the cage in which the medium can be contained will not be a hindrance to him: if he can pass through a substance in a state of sleep, "nothing prevents him from appearing as a phenomenon in front of the audience, in spite of all these precautions." (Note: In Aksakow's opinion, "penetration" of one solid body by another can be imagined as the dematerialization of matter at the moment of passing through the object and then its reverse materialization.)

After the mentioning to the "expansive action" of the mediumistic nerve force that overcomes the "cohesion of material particles" and leads to acoustic phenomena, Hartmann proceeds to spiritistic phenomena related to "penetration of matter", classifying them as "an especially incredible field of phenomena." He refers to the confirmed experiments of Zöllner and the facts of "a transference" of objects into a locked room, which repeatedly observed under the most stringent conditions of control. He lists various types of "the penetration of matter": the passing an iron ring through the hand of a medium, penetration of coins, slate-pencils, etc. in completely closed boxes, the inserting a ring on the table's leg, the tying of knots on ropes and belts with "sealed" ends, the bringing into the séance's room the items from another room or other houses, as well as bringing of flowers which were growing outside the room.

According to Hartmann, medium can't by only his will or by his purely psychological influence, cause the above-mentioned physical phenomena in inanimate objects. The main action of the will is a release the "mediumistic nerve force" out the nervous system and its directing with a certain way on the living or dead objects. Nevertheless, according to him, in the study of any phenomena of mediumism, with the exception of clairvoyance, there is no need to go "beyond the bounds of the natural explanations."

=== On hypothesis of spirits ===
In conclusion, Hartmann assesses the central idea of spiritism:

"Thus the whole hypothesis of spirits has dissolved into pure nothingness, after first the direct physical power, then the production of the phenomena of materialisation, and finally production of the ideality of the manifestations, have shifted from the presupposed spirits to the mediums. Whether there are spirits or not, we do not have to examine here; in any case, if there are any, they are referred back to that other world from which Spiritualism believed them to have sunk into this world." (Note: According to Massey, the spiritualistic hypothesis about the activities of the spirits of dead people was greatly exaggerated, and most of the reports allegedly originating from them could be explained by other reasons that were not recognized. He wrote, "The current Spiritualist conception of death as a simple change of external conditions, so that there is a mere continuity of consciousness on the same level, and in the same modes, seems to me to denote great poverty of thought nor are we constrained to accept it on the evidence of facts." However, according to Richard Hodgson, after he made five hundred séances with a medium Leonora Piper, "no other hypothesis except for the spiritualistic one can explain the phenomena that he observed.")

== Criticism ==
One of the most active critics of Hartmann's book was Alexander Aksakov. (Note: His "Answer for Hartmann" Aksakov began to print in parts in a German journal Psychische Studien immediately after the publication of this book. In 1890, it was published as a single edition entitled Animismus und Spiritismus.) The proofs which Aksakov used to "disprove Hartmann's hallucination hypothesis" were the photographs of spirits. The pictures "taken during the séances, in which both the medium and the materialised form were visible," were convincingly demonstrating, according to Aksakov, that materialisation is "an objective phenomenon", and not a kind the mass hypnosis (see the photo on the left). Criticism by Aksakov was supported in the publications of occultists in the journal Sphinx, where "Hartmann was portrayed variously as obtuse or dishonest for his refusal to recognise his logical errors." Aksakov has been emphasizing that Hartmann had no practical experience and did not pay enough attention to those facts that did not correspond to his convictions, and many phenomena were "completely unknown" to him. (Note: Karl Du Prel highly praised Aksakov's book as having great significance for spreading Spiritism in Germany—it was in detail discussed in his article "Hartmann contra Aksakof" published in the Sphinx in June 1891. He wrote that Hartmann's work takes only 118 pages, whereas Aksakov's response is more than 800 pages (two volumes). This contrast, which is "remarkable in itself," is further strengthened when the reader learns that, according to Hartmann, he himself was never present at séances, whereas Aksakov who has become interested in the Spiritist movement in 1855, since 1870, repeatedly participated in the spiritistic séances.)

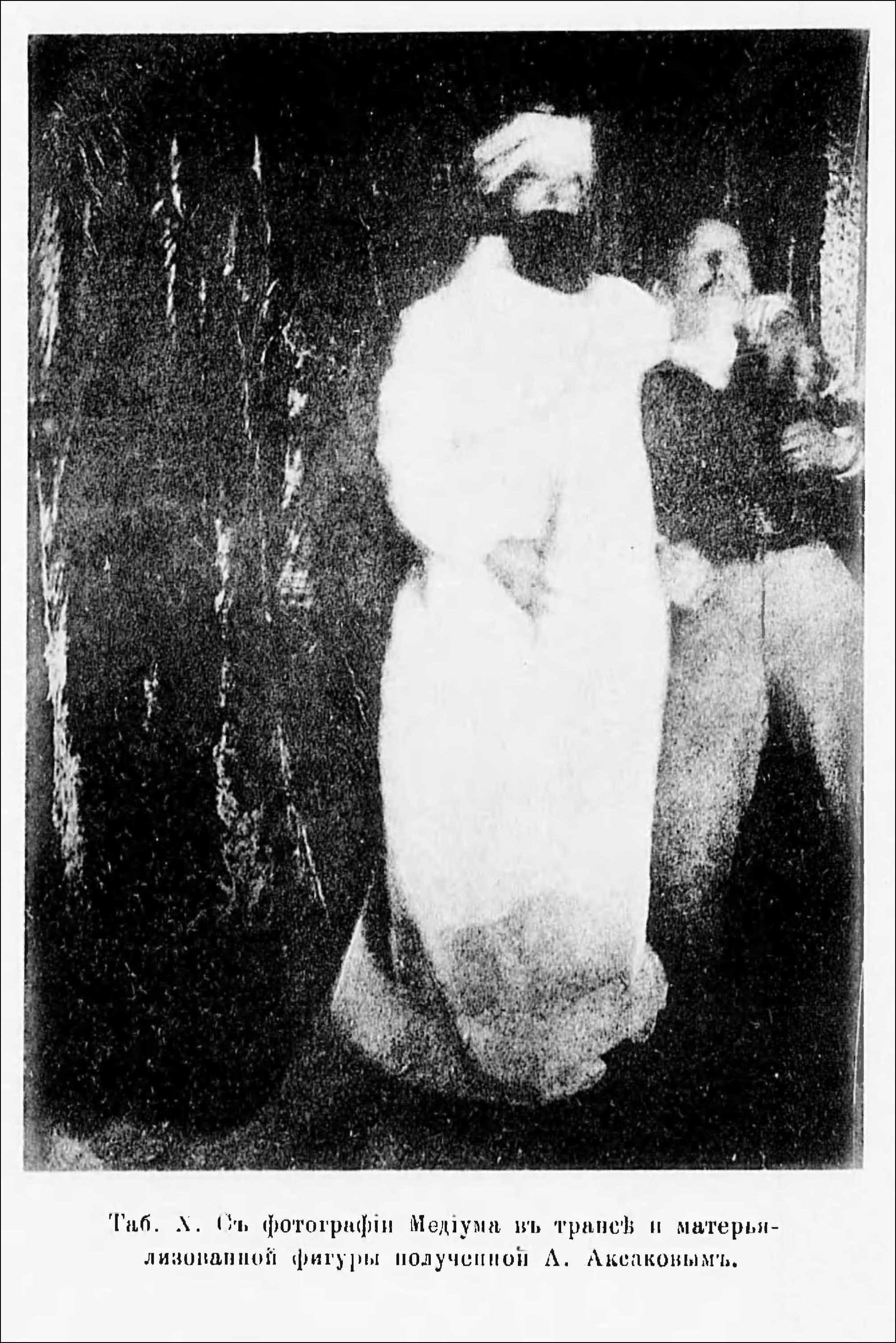
A materialised figure and medium in trance. Photo by A. N. Aksakov.

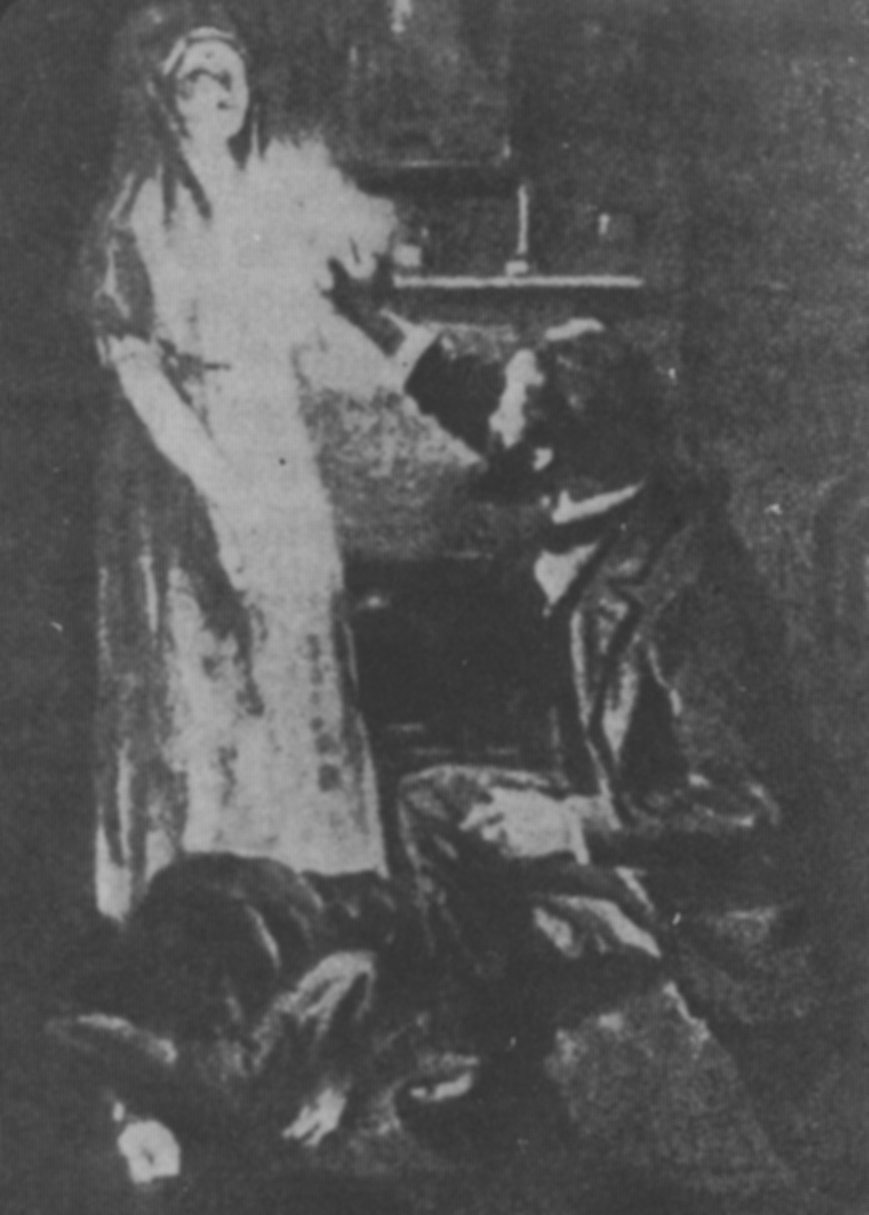
William Crookes, Katie King, and hers medium.

Professor Alfred Lehmann wrote that Hartmann uses his hypotheses, according to how it is more convenient to him: if a materialised figure appears on séance, then for him it is just a hallucination imagined by the participators of the séance; if this phantom is displayed in the photo, then its appearance is explained by the action of the mediumistic nerve force, since otherwise it could not be photographed. But the view arbitrarily using such unstable explanations is "scientifically untenable." Commenting on Hartmann's statement that imprints of the organic forms are produced by the mediumistic nerve force, Aksakov wrote that this hypothesis necessarily leads to "the acceptance of the length, thickness, and density" of this force, in other words, to that which usually serves to define the body, thus such imprints should be produced "by the action of an invisible body formed with help of the medium," that is, by the materialised form. Hartmann also speaks that mediumistic nerve force "can cause thermal and light phenomena," for example, it can produce certain forms, "at least inorganic ones: crosses, stars, a bright field with light points shimmering on it." Hence, here, according to Aksakov's commentary, the nerve force becomes visible and does not constitute a hallucination. Why then does the same force that has become visible in a materialized organic image, sometimes in a luminous one, turns into a hallucination? According to Aksakov, the hallucinatory hypothesis by Hartmann is destroyed "by his own logic."

In connection with the hypothesis of the author, explaining the physical phenomena of mediumship, Massey noted that "the opinion of most persons conversant with them will be that Hartmann's hypothesis is too complicated in itself, and even thus is unadequate to the facts." Karl Du Prel brought such Hartmann's statement from the first chapter of his book: "Since I never attended a séance myself, I am not in a condition to form a judgment on the reality of the phenomena in question... On the other hand, I hold myself at any rate competent to offer a conditional judgment on the conclusions to be drawn from these phenomena in case of their reality, for this is peculiarly the office of the philosopher." Then he commented on this passage as follows:

"I must admit, I always believed that there is 'a golden rule for the philosopher'—to remain silent where he has no experience, so that no one could be told: 'Si tacuisses, philosophus mansisses!' (If you had been silent, you would have remained a philosopher!) That is why my final verdict lies in the fact that Hartmann, with his writings against spiritism, has certainly contributed to eristic but not in philosophy." (Note: Nevertheless, according to professor Heather Wolffram, such researchers as Hartmann and Aksakov with their searches "of a new scientific psychology based on the phenomena of the unconscious" are no less important for modern science than the materialist physiologist Wilhelm Wundt and his colleagues.)

== Translation ==
The book was translated into Russian by chemist Alexander Butlerov.

== Publications ==
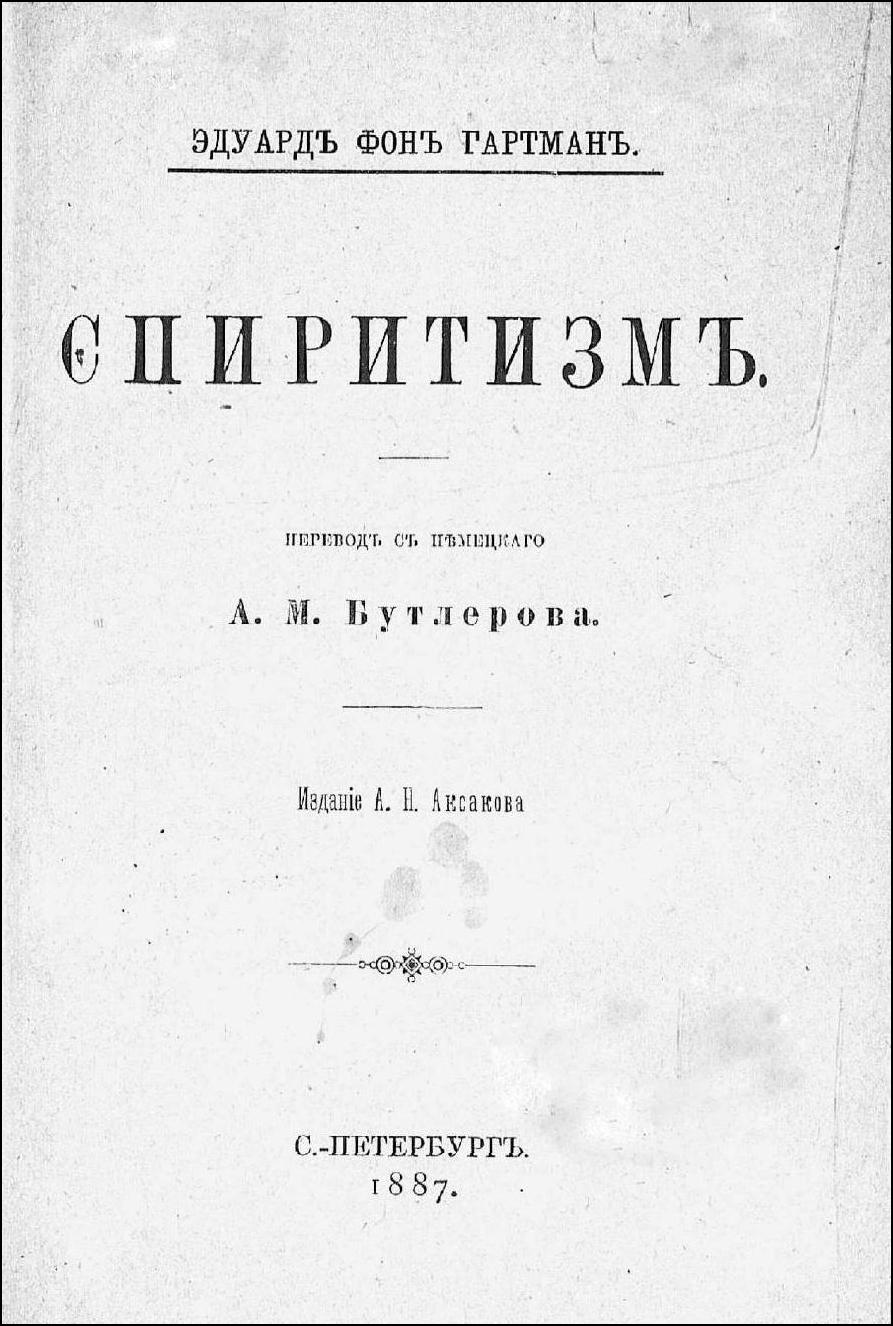
A Russian edition, 1887.

- Der Spiritismus [Spiritism] (in German). Berlin: Wilhelm Friedrich. 1885.
- Der Spiritismus [Spiritism] (in German) (2nd ed.). Leipzig: H. Haacke. 1898 [1885]. OCLC 906590246.
- Der Spiritismus [Spiritism]. Classic Reprint (in German) (Reprint ed.). Fb&c Limited. 2018 [1885]. ISBN 9780428351656.

Translations

- Spiritism. Cambridge Library Collection. Translated by Massey, C. C. (1885 reprint ed.). Cambridge University Press. 2012 [1885]. ISBN 9781108052719.
- Спиритизм [Spiritism] (in Russian). Translated by Бутлеров, А. М.. СПб.: Изд. А. Н. Аксакова. 1887.

== See also ==
- The Occult World
- Mediumship
- "Philosophers and Philosophicules"
- Spiritualism
