= Charlton Templeman Speer =

English composer and spiritualist

Charlton Templeman Speer (21 November 1859 – 27 October 1921) also known as Charlton T. Speer was an English composer and spiritualist.

== Career ==
Speer was born in Cheltenham, he was the son of physician Stanhope Templeman Speer. During the 1870s, William Stainton Moses tutored Speer.

He became a successful composer and Professor of piano at the Royal Academy of Music. Like his father, Speer was a convinced spiritualist. He joined the London Spiritualist Alliance in March 1884.

He married Amy Matilda Hallett in 1887. He died in Sutton, London.

== Compositions ==
Among his compositions were:

- Zara, opera;
- Odysseus, opera;
- Hélène (opera);
- An opening in C for orchestra;
- The ballad Guinevere;
- The suite Cinderella for orchestra;
- The Mayor of Lake Regillus, for choir and orchestra;
- King Arthur symphonic poem;
- Pieces for piano, vocal melodies and religious music.

== Publications ==
- Biography of W. Stainton Moses. In Spirit teachings Through the Mediumship of William Stainton Moses (M.A., Oxon) (1894)
