= Blavatsky Lodge =

The Blavatsky Lodge, officially The Blavatsky Lodge of the Theosophical Society, was an English Theosophical Society founded by Helena Blavatsky and 13 other members.

== History ==
The Blavatsky Lodge was founded on May 19, 1887 in London by 14 members of the London Lodge. It was the second official theosophical lodge in England after the London Lodge, and the third in Europe (after the Loge Germania in Germany). Before its foundation, several members of the London Lodge invited Helena Blavatsky to London, where she arrived on 1 May 1887 from Ostend. She stayed in London until her death on 8 May 1891.

Archibald and Bertram Keightley were considering forming an independent theosophical lodge, which would be focussed on the works of Blavatsky. Other members of the London Lodge gave their approval, and the Blavatsky Lodge was founded. It is unclear if the deed of foundation was signed by Olcott, the president of the society, or by Blavatsky.

The distinguishing factor in the Blavatsky Lodge was that Blavatsky herself was present at the Lodge every Thursday. After a few months, the Blavatsky Lodge had grown substantially. When Blavatsky died, no other theosophical lodge in Great Britain had more members than the Blavatsky Lodge. The discussions with Blavatsky at the Blavatsky Lodge were collected in the Transactions of the Blavatsky Lodge and contain many commentaries on the Secret Doctrine. The members of the Blavatsky Lodge were also involved in the publication of the Lucifer magazine.

After 1890, Annie Besant became president of the Blavatsky Lodge.

In November 1889 Mahatma Gandhi visited the Lodge and met with Blavatsky and Annie Besant. Two members of the society also recommended that Gandhi read the Bhagavad Gita.

The Lodge is still in existence, and is part of the English section of the Theosophical Society Adyar.

== Literature ==
- Helena Petrovna Blavatsky: Secret Doctrine Commentary, Stanzas I-IV, Transactions of the Blavatsky Lodge. Theosophical University Press, Pasadena 1994, ISBN 978-1-55700-028-6
