= Theosophical Society of the Arya Samaj =

The Theosophical Society of Aryavarta, also sometimes called Theosophical Society of India, and abbreviated as Theosophical Society was a Theosophical Society from May 22, 1878 until March 1882.

== History ==
In 1875 Swami Dayanda Saraswati founded in Mumbai the Hindu reform movement Arya Samaj. In the same year, the Theosophical Society was founded by Madame Blavatsky and Henry Olcott in New York.

Olcott met Moolji Thakurshi (Moolji Thackersey) already in 1870, but they lost contact with each other. In 1877 Olcott wrote to Thakurshi, and described the Theosophical Society and its goals to him. Thakurshi replied to Olcott, and told him about the Arya Samaj. He described its goals and gave Olcott the address of its president in Mumbai Hari Chand Chintamani (Hurrychund Chintamon). In the following exchange of letters, they illustrated the positions of their own societies, and noted the agreements between them. Chintamani then became a member of the Theosophical Society, and Olcott began a correspondence with Dayananda Saraswati.

It was suggested to unite the two societies, and the proposal was accepted at a meeting of the Theosophical Society on May 22, 1878 in New York. A branch of the Theosophical Society was founded on June 27, 1878 by Charles Carleton Massey in London. Its name was the British Theosophical Society of the Aryavart.

In December 1878, Blavatsky and Olcott travelled to Mumbai, where they arrived in February 1879. They met Hari Chand Chintamani, and founded the first theosophical lodge in India. They moved the headquarters of the society to Mumbai.

There were however tensions between the two societies, and on March 26, 1882 Dayananda spoke about the Humbuggery of the Theosophists, Olcott replied to Dayanandas charges in The Theosophist in July 1882 in an article titled Swami Dayanand's Charges.

== See also ==
- Arya Samaj

== Literature ==
- John Murdoch: Theosophy unveiled. Madras 1885
- Henry Steel Olcott: Old diary leaves, Inside the occult, the true story of Madame H. P. Blavatsky. Running Press, Philadelphia 1975, ISBN 0-914294-31-8
- Chhajju Singh: Life and teachings of Swami Dayanand Saraswati. New Delhi 1971
