= Sophia Mort =

British children's author (1807–1882)

- Born: 4 September 1807; Nottingham, England
- Died: 13 September 1882 (aged 75); Hendon, Middlesex, England
- Occupation: Principal of ladies' school
- Spouse: William Allbut
- Children: William Sydney, Elizabeth Ann, Thomas Henry, Sophia Jane, Mary Dorothea, Helen Maria, James
- Writing career
- Period: 1849–1859
- Subjects: Children's Literature, Textbooks
- Notable works: Much in Little: A Compendium of Facts & Information (1859) and "Look to the End." (1849)

Sophia Mort (4 September 1807 – 13 September 1882) was a 19th-century British children's author who wrote both a textbook for girls' schools and a Christian short story. Additionally, she served as the principal of a ladies' school for young girls that she ran out of various locations throughout her life.

== Family ==
Sophia Mort was the daughter of James and Dorothy Mort. Her father was heavily involved with the Methodist New Connexion church and was a deeply religious man. After hearing John Wesley preach at Sunderland when he was seventeen years old, he went from being essentially nonreligious to a convert to the Methodist New Connexion. He began his career as minister of in 1797 (the year that the church was established) and served as president of the New Connexion Conference in 1805 (Manchester) and 1821 (Nottingham). During his time as a minister (1807–1827), he was appointed to Circuits in the following areas: Sheffield (multiple times), Chester, Longton, Bolton, Thorne, Hull, Newcastle, Nottingham, Leeds, Hanley, Huddersfield (multiple times), Manchester (multiple times), and Liverpool (where he later died).

Additionally, she was the second wife of William Allbut. William Allbut was an editor and publisher of Pottery Mercury (or the North Staffordshire Mercury), a newspaper detailing the pottery industry in the Staffordshire area They had seven children: William Sidney Allbut (born c. 1838), Elizabeth Ann Allbut (born c. 1840), Thomas Henry Allbut (born 16 August 1842), Sophia Jane Allbut (born c. 1845), Mary Dorothea Allbut (born c. 1848), Helen Maria Allbut (born c. 1852), and James Allbut (born c. 1841). It is possible that James Allbut died in his youth, because his name only appears in the 1841 England Census, when he was merely months old. It is apparent that the Allbut and Mort families were closely connected, but the full extent of the connections is unknown. It is known that both families were involved with a printing press founded by a Mr. Strahan in 1786. The business was first passed to a J. Mort (first name unknown) and then to James Mort (Sophia Mort's father and most likely the son of J. Mort) in c. 1796. Later, John Allbut (William Allbut's grandfather) and Thomas Allbut (William Allbut's father) took over the business. This printing press published material from many genres including, but not limited to, children's literature, Christian literature, and books related to the pottery industry. Sophia's father-in-law Thomas Allbut was a New Connexion Methodist and publisher of children's literature (Elements of Useful Knowledge [1835]).

== Biography ==
=== Childhood ===
Sophia Mort was born in Nottingham, England on 4 September 1807. While it is not known for certain, it is likely that some of Sophia's childhood was spent following her father to different areas across England while he preached.

=== Marriage and Life in Northwood ===
On 3 May 1837 Sophia Mort married William Allbut. At least as early as 1840 Sophia and William were living together in Northwood, Hanley, Staffordshire with Dorothy Mort (Sophia's mother), Elizabeth Mort (Sophia's sister), their children, a few governesses, and seven (or more) pupils. During their time in Northwood, Sophia and Elizabeth Mort ran a boarding and day school for young ladies, teaching them English education, needlework, and other skills. This school was advertised in William Allbut's newspaper the Potteries Mercury in December 1840. In 1842 an article that William Allbut published (and possibly wrote) made members of the Chartist movement angry and the Allbut's house was almost burnt to the ground. Luckily, troops prevented this from happening.

=== Life at "The Mount" ===
On 26 June 1844 William Allbut leased a mansion in Penkhull, Staffordshire called "The Mount" from Josiah Spode IV of Armitage Park (the great-grandson of Josiah Spode I) for a price of £75 per year. In the terms of the lease it was agreed upon that "The Mount" could be used as a school for young ladies, but that no boys were to be taught there. Two days after the lease was signed William Allbut sent a letter to Josiah Spode IV requesting that he help repair some damage on the property (e.g. some of the gates) and telling him that his six-year-old son (William Sydney Allbut) would be "study and play" at the school, even though it was exclusively for girls.

The new location of ladies' school at "The Mount" was first advertised in the Potteries Mercury on 13 July 1844. Then, on 20 January 1845, the Potteries Mercury ran a large advert for the ladies' school in which the school's focus on English education and physical activity (aided by the rural location of "The Mount") is advertised. Sophia Mort's teaching philosophy can be seen in one line of the advertisement which reads, "In this establishment the object of the teachers is to educate, not merely instruct the pupils." The school is known to have taught French, Italian, music, and other basic aspects of 19th century English education for girls. Sophia's daughter Elizabeth Ann Allbut and son Thomas Henry Allbut were both students at this school, along with at least 30 female students (both English and international students). Along with Sophia, the school employed a music teacher, an English teacher, and a French teacher (who was a native of France).

During the time that Sophia was running the ladies' school at "The Mount," her husband William was working as a farmer of 43 acres, along with his normal line of work as a newspaper editor. It is unknown how long the Allbut family leased "The Mount," but they were recorded as present there in the 1851 English Census.

=== Publishing History ===
In 1849 Sophia Mort's short story "Look to the End" was published in copies of The Youth's Magazine over the span of a year. The Youth's Magazine was a publication containing religious-themed short stories released on a monthly basis. Sophia Mort signed each monthly release of "Look to the End." with her initials (S.A.). Later, in 1859, Sophia Mort's book Much in Little: A Compendium of Facts & Information was published by Routledge, Warnes, & Routledge found on Farringdon Street, London. When writing various copies of this book, she authors it under the names Mrs. Allbut or Mrs. Wm. Allbut (her husband's name), never referring to herself as Sophia. This book contains important names, dates, and facts that Mort deemed necessary for her audience (girls enrolled in 18th-century, English schools) to commit to memory. For instance, the book discusses biblical facts, astronomical terms, and English history, among many other topics. The book's purpose was not to replace oral instruction in the classroom or other textbooks being employed by the English school system. Rather, Mort states that her purpose in writing this compilation of information is to eliminate the need of the teacher and the student to consult numerous textbooks to find important facts. She writes that students should review various sections of the book at set intervals in order to memorize its information. Mort wrote the notice section of this book while in Rock Ferry, Cheshire, England in February 1859. Much in Little was advertised in "The Bookseller" (on 25 March, 25 May and 25 July 1859), "The Publishers' Circular" (1 April 1859 and 16 July 1859).

=== Later life ===
By 1861 Sophia and her family had moved to Chester Road in Lower Bebington where Sophia was still the principal of a ladies' school Her husband was now working as both an accountant and a farmer. At this time Sophia's sister Elizabeth Mort was working as an assistant teacher and Sophia's daughter Elizabeth Ann Allbut had begun working as the music teacher at her mother's school. By 1871 Sophia and her family had moved again, this time to Chester, where her husband was a farmer of 170 acres and she was still running the ladies' school. In addition to Elizabeth Ann Allbut working as a music teacher, Helen Maria Allbut now was working as a teacher and Elizabeth Mort was the vice president of the school. Sometime between 1871 and 1879 Sophia and her family moved to Hendon, Middlesex where her ladies' school followed her. On 15 February 1879 Sophia's husband died in Hendon and she became the head of her household. She continued to work alongside Elizabeth Mort, Elizabeth Ann Allbut, Mary Dorothea Allbut, and Helen Maria Allbut to manage the affairs of the ladies' school.

Sophia Mort died at age 75 in Hendon, Middlesex, England on 13 September 1882. On 17 November 1882 Sophia's personal estate (totaling £1,690 13s. 4d.) was granted to Elizabeth Ann Allbut (her eldest daughter).

== Literary works ==
- "Look to the End." (1849) - The Youth's Magazine
- Much in Little: A Compendium of Facts & Information (1859)
