= Edmund Rogers =

English journalist and spiritualist

Edmund Dawson Rogers
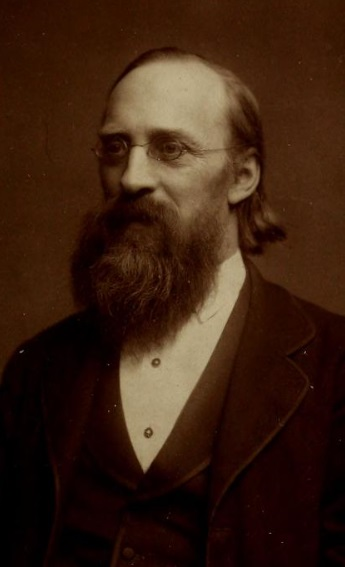
- Born: 7 August 1823; Holt, Norfolk, England
- Died: 28 September 1910 (aged 87); Finchley, Middlesex, England
- Occupations: Journalist, spiritualist

Edmund Dawson Rogers (7 August 1823 – 28 September 1910), was an English journalist and spiritualist. He was the first editor of the Eastern Daily Press and the founder of the National Press Agency.

== Background and education ==
The son of John and Sarah Rogers, and given the middle name Dawson which was his mother's family name, he was born at Holt, Norfolk, and brought up a strict Methodist. He received a classical education at Gresham's School, Holt, then was apprenticed to a pharmacist.

== Career ==
In 1845, he went as a surgeon's dispenser to Wolverhampton, where he joined the Staffordshire Mercury as a journalist.

In 1848 he was appointed as editor of the struggling Norwich newspaper the Norfolk News, and put it on its feet. The proprietors at the time were two future Liberal members of parliament, Jacob Henry Tillett and J. J. Colman. On 10 October 1870, Rogers became the first editor of the Eastern Counties Daily Press, working for the same proprietors, remaining until 1872. In 1871, the paper was renamed the Eastern Daily Press.

In 1873, Rogers moved to London and at the request of leading members of the Liberal Party established the National Press Agency in Shoe Lane, remaining as manager until he retired in 1894.

The National Press Agency had an enormous scoop as part of the Hawarden Kite affair in December 1885, when William Ewart Gladstone's son Herbert Gladstone gave Rogers what he said were his father's opinions on Irish home rule.

In London Rogers also published and edited The Tenant Farmer (1894–1898) and The Free Speaker (1873–1874).

== Spiritualist ==
About 1843 Rogers was introduced by Sir Isaac Pitman to the work of Swedenborg. He went on to study mesmerism and mesmeric healing. He began to attend séances in 1869 with various mediums, especially Mrs Thomas Everitt and William Eglinton, and became a spiritualist. In 1873 he helped to form the British National Association of Spiritualists, and in 1881 founded the spiritualist journal Light, which he edited from 1894 until his death in 1910. In 1881–1882 he founded the Society for Psychical Research, with Sir William Barrett. Its early members included William Stainton Moses, F. W. H. Myers, Henry Sidgwick, and Edmund Gurney, and Rogers was a member of its Council from 1882 to 1885. In 1884, he was a founding member of the London Spiritualist Alliance, afterwards the College of Psychic Studies, and was its president from 1892 until 1910.

== Private life ==
On 11 July 1843, Rogers married Sophia Jane Hawkes, a daughter of Joseph Hawkes. They had two sons and four daughters. His wife died in 1892. Rogers survived her until 1910.

In Who's Who, Rogers gave his recreation as "Occasional rambles in Switzerland". At the time of his death, his address was Rose Villa, Hendon Lane, Finchley, London N.

== Publications ==
- Life and Experiences of Edmund Dawson Rogers, Spiritualist and Journalist (autobiography, 1911, new edition by Kessinger Publishing, London, 2004) ISBN 1-4191-7303-0

== Sources ==
- Owen, William Benjamin (1885–1900). "Rogers, Edmund Dawson" . Dictionary of National Biography. London: Smith, Elder & Co.
- William Ewart Gladstone (12 December 1968). The Gladstone Diaries 1833–1839. Oxford University Press. ISBN 978-0-19-821370-3.
