= Kite-flying =

Kite-flying may refer to

- Flying a kite, a type of tethered aircraft
- Kite-flying (politics) or trial balloon, a political tactic where a politician, through the media, raises/leaks an idea to gauge public reactions to it
