= Raise the Flag =

Raise the flag or Raise the Flag may refer to:

- raise the flag (ellipsis of raise the flag and see who salutes) as a variation of the catchphrase run it up the flagpole (ellipsis of let's run it up the flagpole and see if anyone salutes it)
- "Horst-Wessel-Lied" (known also as "Die Fahne hoch", rendered in English as "Raise the Flag"), the Nazi Party anthem
- Raise the Flag, the 2019 Sandaime J Soul Brothers tour
- "Raise the Flag", a 2010 Airbourne song from the No Guts. No Glory. album

== See also ==
- Suicide Squad: Raise the Flag
