= George Wyld =

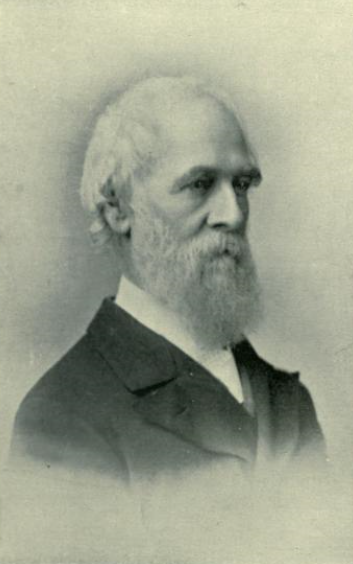
- Born: 1821
- Died: 1906 (aged 84–85)
- Occupations: Physician, spiritualist, Theosophist, writer

George Wyld (1821–1906) was a Scottish homeopathic physician and Christian Theosophist.

== Career ==
Wyld became interested in homeopathy in 1851 after discovering the work of Samuel Hahnemann whilst a medical student at Edinburgh. After he obtained his M. D. with the thesis 'The liver: the hydrogenator in animals' he moved to London where he taught homeopathy and in 1876 became president of the British Homeopathic Society.

Wyld was interested in mesmerism, spiritualism and Theosophy. He has been described as one of the "oldest mesmerists in England". Wyld was also a proponent of phrenology. He 1844 he joined the London Phrenological Society. He was a convinced spiritualist, in 1854 he met the medium Daniel Dunglas Home.

In October 1876 he defended the fraudulent slate-writing medium Henry Slade at his trial. He help to organize a spiritualists defense fund to cover Slade's legal costs. Because of this he received great criticism from the medical community.

Wyld was a vice-president for the British National Association of Spiritualists and an early member of the Society for Psychical Research.

== Theosophy ==
In the 1879 Wyld joined the British Theosophical Society and was its president during 1880–1882. He resigned in 1882 faced with Madame Blavatsky's opposition to Christianity.

Wyld initially was impressed by Blavatsky, believing her to possess mediumistic powers, but later fell out with her. He resigned after she had written an article in The Theosophist claiming "there is no personal or impersonal God." He did not then abandon Theosophy altogether, forming his own hybrid known as Christo-Theosophy.

== Publications ==
- Homoeopathy (1853)
- Diseases of the Heart and Lungs: Their Physical Diagnosis, and Homeopathic and Hygienic Treatment (1860)
- Theosophy and the Higher Life; Or, Spiritual Dynamics and the Divine and Miraculous Man (1880)
- Theosophy: Or Spiritual Dynamics and the Divine and Miraculous Man (1895)
- Notes of My Life (1903)
