= Spiritualist Association of Great Britain =

British spiritualist organisation

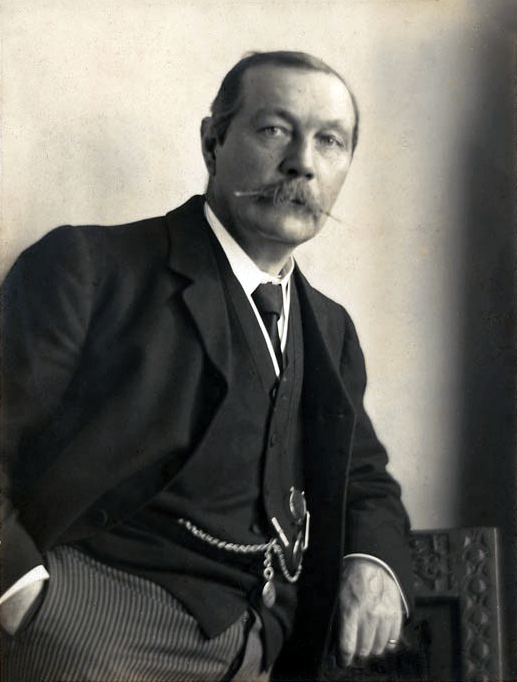
Arthur Conan Doyle was a well known supporter of the SAGB.

The Spiritualist Association of Great Britain (the SAGB) is a British spiritualist organisation. It was established on 10 July 1872.

== History ==
The SAGB grew out of the Marylebone Spiritualist Association (founded 1872). The story of the association's early struggles "to propagate spiritual truths in the Marylebone area of London" is told in an SAGB publication, "One Hundred Years of Spiritualism", which also states that Queen Victoria allegedly held several séances after the death of the Prince Consort.

A famous and outspoken supporter of the SAGB was Arthur Conan Doyle, who (according to his obituary in the New York Times) in later years "often expressed a wish that he should be remembered for his psychic work rather than for his novels".

Serving the principles of the Spiritualist movement, and open to members and non-members alike, the SAGB offers rooms where the public, whether Spiritualist or not, may sit for readings with spirit mediums. Sunday services are free and include a public Demonstration of mediumship. Private 30-minute sittings are available daily during opening hours for a fee. They may be recorded if the client wishes. The nature of the sittings is strictly limited by a policy which states that the mediums are "to try to provide evidence of survival [of the spirit after death] and not to predict the future."

The library of the SAGB was named after the spiritualist William Crookes.

The SAGB's current headquarters is at the Victoria Charity Centre at 11 Belgrave Road, London.

== Beliefs ==
As an organization, the SAGB describes their goals as:

To offer evidence to the bereaved that man survives the change called death and, because he is a spiritual being, retains the faculties of individuality, personality and intelligence, and can willingly return to those left on earth, ties of love and friendship being the motivating force. To offer spiritual healing to those suffering from dis-ease, whether in mind, body or spirit, in a warm and loving environment. With both of these objectives in mind, to offer only the best and highest so that those on both sides of the veil can progress in a truly spiritual sense.

The SAGB and its mediums abide by the following seven principles of belief:

- That there is an Infinite Intelligence, Who governs all
- That personal identity and all sentient forms of life survive physical death
- That continuous existence and eternal progress occur for all in the Hereafter
- That there is communion with the spiritual realms
- That all of humanity is spiritually linked
- That in the Hereafter, all must account for their actions on earth and will judge themselves accordingly
- That all are responsible for the way they conduct their earthly lives.

== Notable members and supporters ==
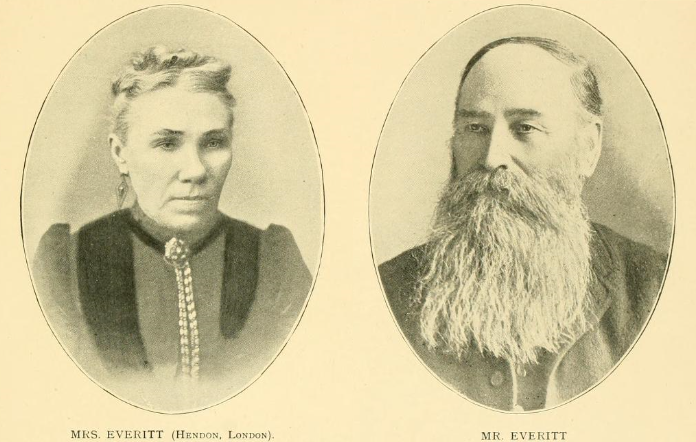
Thomas Everitt (right) was president of the SAGB from 1880 to 1905.

- Emma Hardinge Britten
- Doris Collins
- Lord Dowding
- Arthur Conan Doyle
- Thomas Everitt
- James Manby Gully
- G. Wilson Knight
- Florence Marryat
- Estelle Roberts
- W. T. Stead
- Ena Twigg

== Controversy surrounding Headquarter relocation ==
The SAGB historic headquarters at 33 Belgrave Square was sold in 2010 for 6 million pounds. It relocated to a new home in the Victoria Charity Centre at 11 Belgrave Road, London, near Victoria Station. In 2013, the Charity Commission for England and Wales launched an investigation in to the sale of the property, after discovering that the subsequent owners sold the property for 21 million pounds shortly after purchasing it from the SAGB. The Committee published a report of its findings on 30 March 2017. The Commission's report concluded SAGB's trustees had failed to fulfil their legal duties and responsibilities towards the charity, and that ‘the failures and breaches were not minor or technical in nature’ but ‘amount to basic and serious mismanagement’. The charity responded to the Commission's report claiming that they "could not have foreseen what would happen in future" regarding property prices. S.A.G.B. headquarters are now at 341, Queens town Road, Battersea, London SW8 4LH

== See also ==
- College of Psychic Studies
- Spiritualists' National Union
