= Hawarden Kite =

1885 British press story

The Hawarden Kite was a famous British newspaper scoop of December 1885, revealing that Liberal Party leader and Leader of the Opposition William Ewart Gladstone now supported home rule for Ireland. It was an instance of "kite-flying", made by Gladstone's son Herbert, who often served as his father's secretary. It was given to Edmund Rogers of the National Press Agency in London. The statement was accurate but it is unknown whether the father knew and approved of releasing it to the press. The bombshell announcement resulted in the fall of Lord Salisbury's Conservative government. Irish Nationalists, led by Charles Parnell's Irish Parliamentary Party, held the balance of power in Parliament. Gladstone's conversion to home rule convinced them to switch away from the Conservatives and support the Liberals using the 86 seats in Parliament they controlled.

The expression refers to Hawarden Castle, which was Gladstone's home.

== Background ==
Although there is some historical debate surrounding the issue, the consensus is that the Hawarden Kite incident was a political disaster for William Gladstone. Gladstone had converted to home rule sometime during his second prime ministry of 1880–1885; however, he knew that passing it through Parliament, particularly the House of Lords, would be very troublesome. Therefore, Gladstone had sought cross-party agreement on the issue of home rule, thinking that the Conservatives should pass to make it easier to get it through the House of Lords. Catholic Emancipation in 1829, Corn Laws repeal in 1846, and the Representation of the People Act 1867 had been all cross-party acts passed by Conservative governments.

Gladstone also felt that the Representation of the People Act 1884, which increased the franchise, would give him increased and perhaps permanent majorities in subsequent elections. Formerly a Conservative MP, he was now head of the Liberal Party, and considered that support from the Irish Home Rule MPs would further strengthen his position in the House of Commons. The Irish Party was then a third force in parliament.

Meanwhile, in London on 1 August 1885 the Conservative minister Lord Carnarvon, Viceroy of Ireland, had met Charles Stewart Parnell, the Irish Home Rule leader, for a confidential discussion to see how far each could meet the other's policy. Parnell assumed that Carnarvon was representing the Cabinet and would agree to his proposals that Carnarvon described as "surprisingly moderate".

Conservative leader Lord Salisbury wanted the meeting kept secret, now that he knew Parnell's position, and hoped also that Parnell would mention the discussion to Gladstone. This might move Gladstone to up the ante and formally declare his support for home rule, offering slightly more than Parnell had indicated to Carnarvon; Salisbury believed that such a declaration would split the Liberals.

== The kite ==
On 17 December 1885 Gladstone's son Herbert had a letter published in The Times. It included:

"Nothing could induce me to countenance separation, but if five-sixths of the Irish people wish to have a Parliament in Dublin, for the management of their own local affairs, I say, in the name of justice, and wisdom, let them have it."

This promised a large amount of local control within Ireland, but Ireland would remain linked to Britain, with Queen Victoria as head of state, and it would remain in the British Empire. The policy was strongly opposed by Protestants in Ireland, who supported the Conservatives. Gladstone hoped that Salisbury might feel honour-bound to allow his MPs to vote for and against the policy, thereby splitting the Conservatives.

== Reactions ==
Once news of Gladstone's conversion came to light following the Hawarden Kite, Liberals and Irish Nationalist MPs voted together to end Lord Salisbury's caretaker administration. This led Salisbury to believe Gladstone was playing games with him and he remained opposed to Irish home rule.

Salisbury had commented on 9 November:

"The integrity of the Empire is more precious to us than any possession we can have. We are bound by motives, not only of expediency, not only of legal principle, but by motives of honour, to protect the minority."

That minority in Ireland formed the Irish Unionist Alliance and the loyalist Orange Order increased its numbers markedly.

Gladstone won the 1885 United Kingdom general election, but when he proposed the Government of Ireland Bill later in 1886, 93 Liberal MPs voted against, causing the 1886 United Kingdom general election. The Liberals opposed to home rule contested as the Liberal Unionist Party, and Lord Salisbury became prime minister with their support.
