= Stanhope Templeman Speer =

British physician and mountain climber

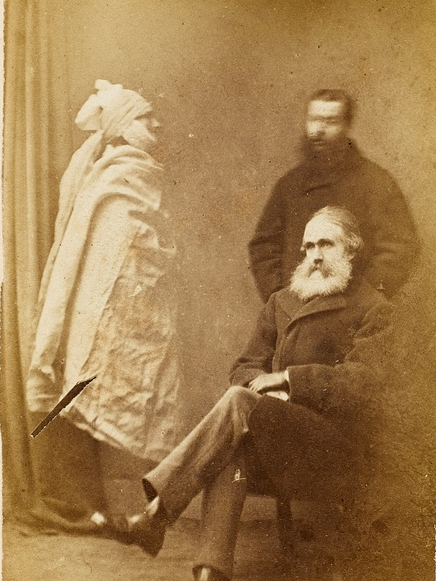
Speer (sitting) with William Stainton Moses and alleged spirit.

Stanhope Templeman Speer (20 October 1823 – 9 February 1889) was a British physician and mountain climber.

Speer worked at Brompton Hospital in London and specialized in treating chest diseases. He has been described as the first physician to describe mountain sickness in a medical journal.

In 1844 he was the first man to climb the Mittelhorn, the highest summit of the Wetterhorn in Switzerland.

Speer was a spiritualist and friend of the medium William Stainton Moses. In the 1870s, Moses resided with Speer and his wife and tutored their son. Speer was an early member of The Ghost Club and the Society for Psychical Research. He was a member of the British National Association of Spiritualists.

His son Charlton Templeman Speer who became a famous composer, was also a spiritualist.
