= Doris Collins =

British spiritualist (1918–2003)

Doris Collins (1918-2003) was a British spiritualist and psychic medium.

== Biography ==
Collins was born on 10 February 1918 in Essex, England and was the youngest of a family of nine children. From a young age Collins claimed to be able to see spirits a psychic ability she said to have throughout her life. She attended a Spiritualist church and in 1958 became the president of Woodford National Spiritualist Church in Essex. She became a resident at the Spiritualist Association of Great Britain and made trips to the United States, Australia and toured Great Britain offering her mediumship services to people for money.

She wrote three books on Spiritualism A Woman of Spirit (1985), The Power Within (1988) and Positive Forces (1991).

== Skepticism ==
Collins has been described as a cold reader by the scientific community. James Randi examined a videotape of her mediumship from one of her shows and caught her cold reading.
