= Florence Cook (medium) =

British medium (ca. 1856–1904)

- Born: Ca. 1856
- Died: 22 April 1904
- Occupation: Medium

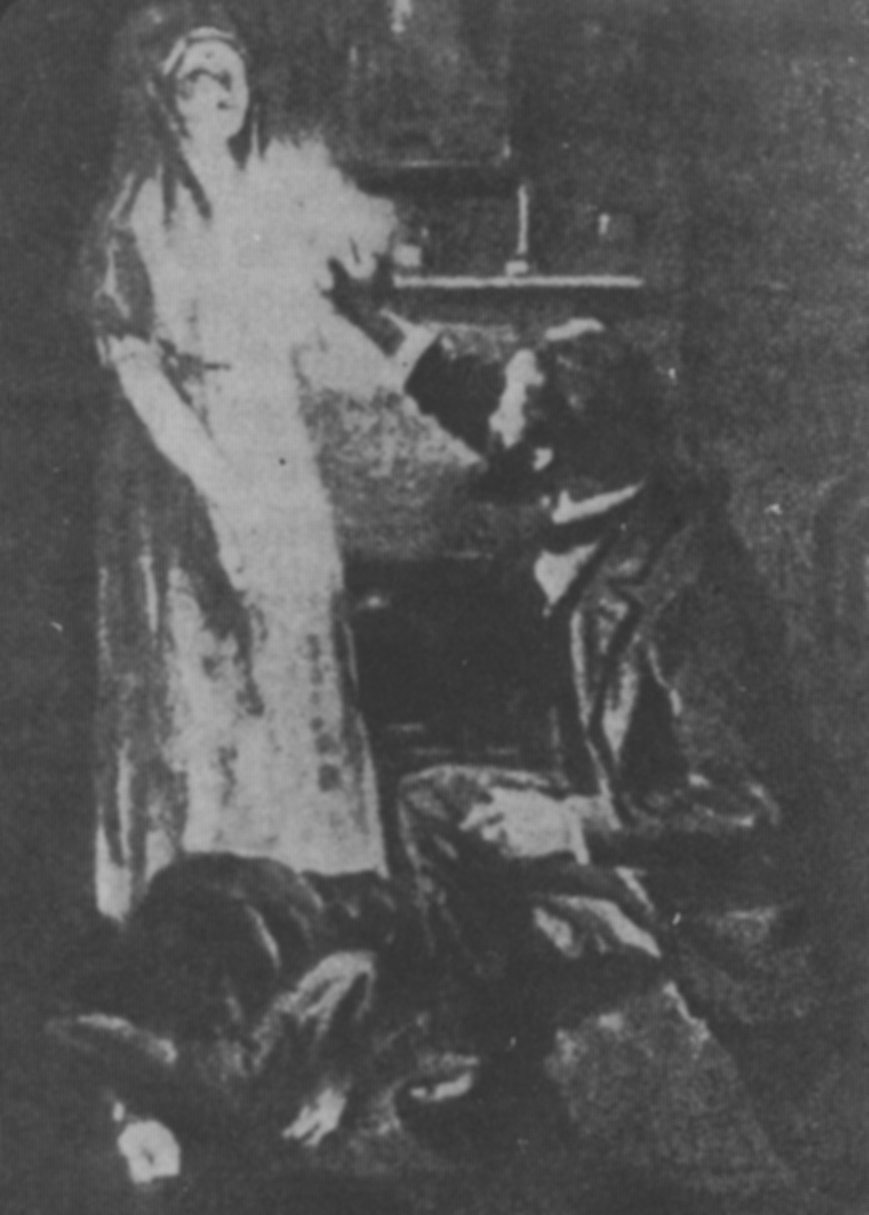
Katie King, Florence Cook and Sir William Crookes

Florence Eliza Cook (ca 1856 – 22 April 1904) was a medium who claimed to materialise a spirit, "Katie King". The question of whether the spirit was real or a fraud was a notable public controversy of the mid-1870s. Her abilities were endorsed by Sir William Crookes but many observers were skeptical of Crookes's investigations, both at the time and subsequently.

== Biography ==
=== Early life ===
Cook was born in Kent but moved to Hackney, East London when she was three years old. Her family lived at 16 Bruce Villas, opposite London Fields.

=== Career ===
Cook started to claim mediumistic abilities in 1870 as a teenager. She held her first seances at home and during one such event, was told that she should contact the nearby Dalston Association of Enquirers into Spiritualism. She impressed the Association's Secretary Thomas Blyton, who published an article about her in The Spiritualist.

She worked briefly as an assistant at Eliza Cliff's private school in Richmond, but by 1872, she had lost her job.

In 1871–2 she developed her abilities under the established mediums Frank Herne and Charles Williams. Herne was associated with the spirit "John King", and Florence became associated with "Katie King", stated to be John King's daughter. Herne was exposed as a fraud in 1875. Katie King developed from appearing as a disembodied face to a fully physical materialisation.

The spirit was said to have appeared first between 1871 and 1874 in séances conducted by Florence Cook in London, and later in 1874–1875 in New York in séances held by the mediums Jennie Holmes and her husband Nelson Holmes.

Katie King was believed by Spiritualists to be the daughter of John King, a spirit control of the 1850s through the 1870s that appeared in many séances involving materialised spirits. A spirit control is a powerful and communicative spirit that organises the appearance of other spirits at a séance. John King claimed to be the spirit of Henry Morgan, the buccaneer (Doyle 1926: volume 1, 241, 277).

At Hackney on 9 December 1873, lawyer William Volckman attended a séance held by Florence Cook, during which Katie King materialised and, as was customary, held the hands of participants. Suspicious of the spirit's similarity with Cook, Volckman seized the spirit's hand and waist, accusing it of being the medium masquerading as her ghost. The spirit was wrestled from Volckman's grasp by other participants and returned to a cabinet from which Cook emerged some minutes later. Volckman published his opinion that the spirit was a masquerade by Cook. Supporters of Miss Cook denounced Volckman on the grounds that he had broken his agreement to proper etiquette required in the séance, thus negating his credibility as an investigator: Volckman was associated with another medium, Mrs Guppy, who might have wished to denigrate her rival. Moreover, it was argued that since spirits borrowed energy and matter from their medium, it was not surprising that Katie King resembled Cook. Despite the defence of their position, Cook and her supporters were hurt by this incident – newspapers were referring to it as an "exposure" – and sought further support for their position. To this end, they turned to Crookes, who was a prominent and respected scientist (Noakes, 130-1).

=== Investigations ===
Between 1871 and 1874, Sir William Crookes investigated the preternatural phenomena produced by Spiritualist mediums. He described the conditions he imposed on mediums as follows: "It must be at my own house, and my own selection of friends and spectators, under my own conditions, and I may do whatever I like as regards apparatus" (Doyle 1926: volume 1, 177). The alleged medium Daniel Dunglas Home asserted that Crookes was duped by Cook.

A 15-year-old Cook, alone in Crookes' house with Crookes' friends and family as witnesses, was said to have materialised the spirit of Katie King, who walked about, talked, allowed herself to be weighed and measured, and even held the family's baby (Doyle 1926: volume 1, 241). On one occasion, at a joint seance in Crookes's home in March 1874, Katie King was seen in company with "Florence Maple", a spirit materialised by the medium Mary Showers who was exposed as a fraud shortly thereafter. The sessions were held with the medium secluded in the dark, because Spiritualists believe that materialisation requires very dim surroundings to succeed, though occasionally the spirits materialised in the light and some photographs were taken. As is apparently typical of materialised spirits, Katie's exact height and weight varied, though Katie was always taller than Florence Cook, with a larger face, and different hair and skin. According to those present, the two were both visible at the same moments, so that Florence could not have assumed the role of the spirit (Doyle 1926: volume 1, 235–240).

The final appearances of Katie King in connection with Florence Cook took place in April and May 1874, at the Cook family home in Hackney. The audiences were invited to sit in a parlour opening onto a bedroom, in which Florence would start her trance. After some time Katie King would emerge. At some point the audience would be shown a figure, apparently Florence, lying on the floor of the bedroom with her head covered by a shawl while Katie King was still visible in the parlour. A number of the witnesses, such as Edward W. Cox, recorded their doubts about the proceedings, while others claimed that they had seen the two clearly, such as Crookes and Florence Marryat, who claimed that she had seen Katie naked in Florence's company.

Crookes' report, published in 1874, contained his assertion that Florence Cook, as well as the mediums Kate Fox and Daniel Dunglas Home, were producing genuine preternatural phenomena (Crookes 1874). The publication caused an uproar, and his testimony about Katie King was considered the most outrageous and sensational part of the report. Cook was repeatedly exposed as a fraud medium but she had been "trained in the arts of the séance" which managed to trick Crookes. Historian Courtney Raia has posited that Crookes' relationship with Cook had become romantic in nature and that his affair with the publicly criticized medium was a driving force behind his limited, yet supposedly genuine support.

In 1880 another of Cook's materialisations was interrupted by one of the witnesses, George Sitwell, who seized the spirit figure and revealed that the medium was not in her chair.

After studying the reports, science historian Sherrie Lynne Lyons wrote "Katie" was Florence herself and at other times an accomplice. Regarding Crookes, Lyons wrote "Here was a man with a flawless scientific reputation, who discovered a new element, but could not detect a real live maiden who was masquerading as a ghost.

=== Personal life ===
Cook married Edward Elgie Corner, the son of Amelia, a board member of the Dalston Association of Enquirers into Spiritualism. She filed for divorce a year later, citing domestic violence. However, it appears that the divorce was never finalised. The couple had had three children.

=== Death ===
Cook died in Battersea in 1904.

=== In popular culture ===
Cook was played by Twiggy in 'The Frontiers of Science', the first episode of the 1976 Granada TV series Victorian Scandals.
