= College of Psychic Studies =

NGO in South Kensington, England

Coordinates: 51.49461°N 0.17762°W

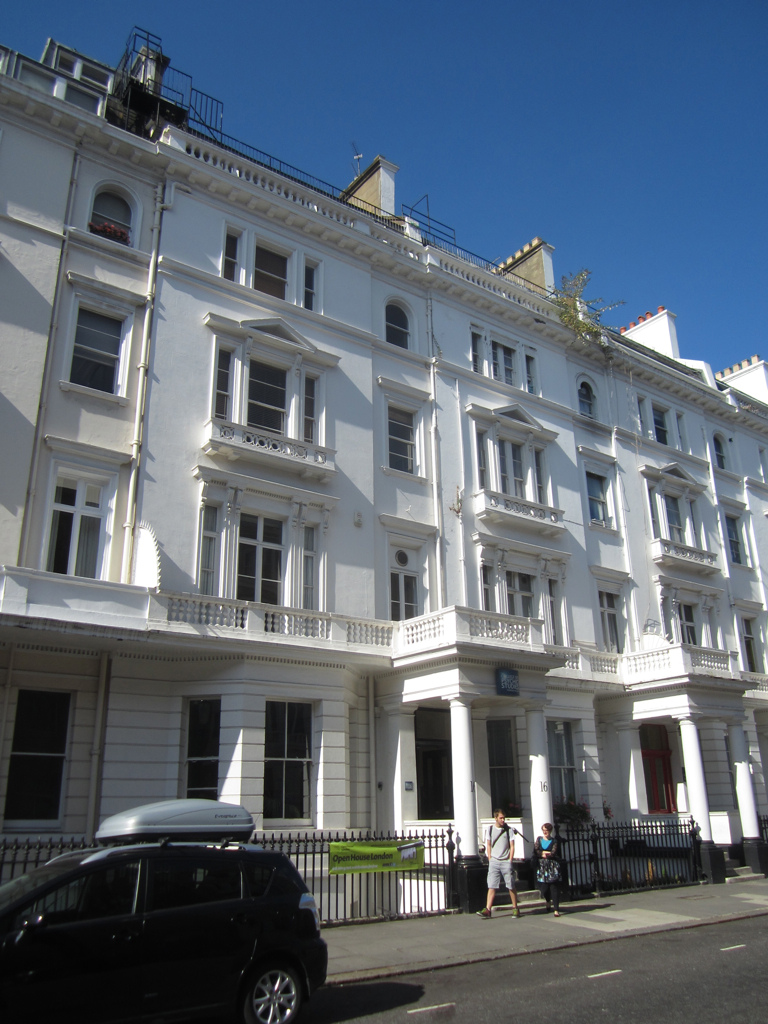
The College building on Queensberry Place

The College of Psychic Studies (founded in 1884 as the London Spiritualist Alliance) is a non-profit organisation based in South Kensington, London. It is dedicated to the study of psychic and spiritualist phenomena.

== History ==
=== British National Association of Spiritualists ===
In August 1873, the British National Association of Spiritualists (BNAS) was formed by Thomas Everitt, Edmund Rogers and others at a meeting in Liverpool.

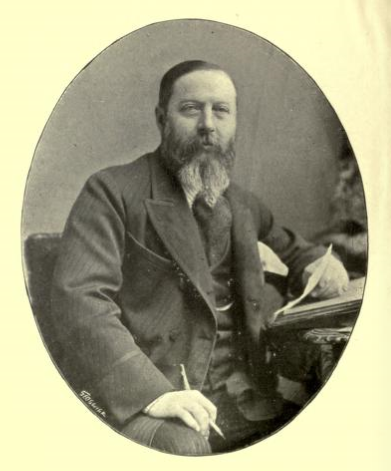
William Stainton Moses, founder of the London Spiritualist Alliance

Early members included well known spiritualists such as Charles Maurice Davies, Charles Isham, William Stainton Moses, Stanhope Templeman Speer, Morell Theobald and George Wyld. The BNAS carried out experimental séances and investigations into mediumship. It held no dogmatic religious views but was known for "sympathising with the religion of Jesus Christ".

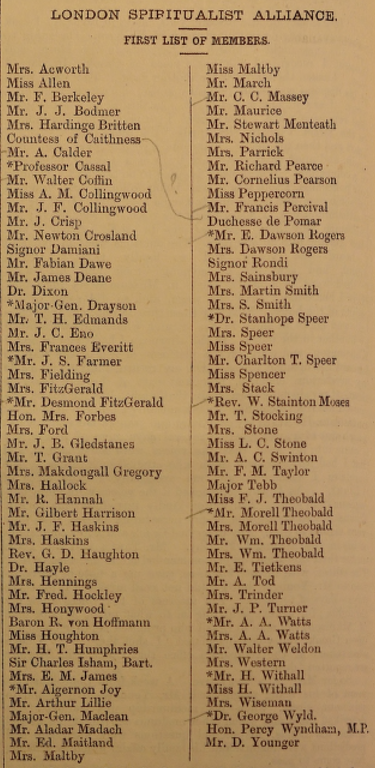
Member list for the London Spiritualist Alliance in March 1884

The first public meeting of the BNAS took place on 16 April 1874 under the chairmanship of Samuel Carter Hall. By 1875 the BNAS had over 400 members. Its headquarters moved to Great Russell Street, London. In 1879 the German astrophysicist Johann Karl Friedrich Zöllner became an honorary member.

William Henry Harrison and his colleagues from the "Scientific Research Committee" of the BNAS were involved in experiments that weighed mediums during materialization séances. Specially built self-recording instruments were used. This was considered controversial and not all members agreed in conducting such experiments. In 1872, Harrison also caused controversy in the spiritualist community by exposing the fraud of spirit photographer Frederick Hudson. In 1875, Harrison with C. F. Varley conducted an unsuccessful experiment in photographing the alleged Odic force of Carl Reichenbach.

There was a large dispute between Moses and Harrison over its leadership council. Harrison was expelled from the BNAS. In April 1879, Charles Massey a vice-president resigned, as did Moses on 31 December 1880. In 1882, the BNAS changed name to the Central Association of Spiritualists (CAS). The remaining members such as vice-president Edmund Rogers, one of Moses's loyal supporters tried to reconstruct the society. However, internal conflict between members and financial problems caused the group to dissolve.

=== London Spiritualist Alliance ===
In October 1883 a special conference was set up to discuss the ideas of Moses to form a new society. In March 1884, Moses and others formed the London Spiritualist Alliance (LSA). The first meeting was held on 5 May at the banqueting room in St James's Hall. Moses was president and members included John Stephen Farmer, Massey, Rogers, Stanhope Templeman Speer, Alaric Alfred Watts and Percy Wyndham. After Moses died in 1892, Rogers became the president. The LSA obtained a wider membership under the leadership of Rogers including notable figures such as Alfred Russel Wallace.

In 1886, Eleanor Sidgwick from the Society for Psychical Research (SPR) claimed that the medium William Eglinton was fraudulent. Members from the LSA and articles in the journal Light supported Eglinton and accused Sidgwick of bias and prejudice. Some spiritualist members resigned from the SPR.

In 1925, Arthur Conan Doyle became president and the LSA bought a new headquarters at Queensberry Place, South Kensington.

Between October 1930 and June 1931 the materialization medium Helen Duncan was investigated by the LSA. Despite early favourable reports, an examination of Duncan's ectoplasm revealed it was made of cheesecloth, paper mixed with the white of egg and lavatory paper stuck together. One of Duncan's tricks was to swallow and regurgitate some of her ectoplasm and she was persuaded to swallow a tablet of methylene blue before one of her séances to rule out any chance of this trick being performed and because of this no ectoplasm appeared. The journal Light endorsed the court decision that Duncan was fraudulent and supported Harry Price's investigation that revealed her ectoplasm was cheesecloth.

=== College of Psychic Studies ===
In 1955 the LSA changed its name to the College of Psychic Science. In 1970 it became the College of Psychic Studies.

According to psychical researcher Simeon Edmunds, by the 1955 name change there was "no doubt that from that time onwards the society was no longer a spiritualist one" as it was accepting non-spiritualist members and held no corporate opinion on the question of survival. In the 1960s, after a revival in spiritualism, the college associated itself with the Society for Psychical Research, collecting thousands of case files.

Paul Beard was the president of the college for 16 years. In 2006, the college offered twelve courses on psychic abilities.

In April 2021 The College re-launched their website with an expanded programme of online courses, talks and events able to be completed online. Their former president, Geoffrey Dart C.B.E, references this being partly in response to the challenges of running in-person events during the Covid-19 pandemic.

== Publications ==
=== Books ===
In 1930, the London Spiritualist Alliance published a series of five books under L.S.A Publications Ltd. These were:

- Helen A. Dallas. Human Survival and its Implications.
- Charles Drayton Thomas. The Mental Phenomena of Spiritualism.
- Stanley De Brath. The Physical Phenomena of Spiritualism.
- Helen MacGregor and Margaret V. Underhill. The Psychic Faculties and Their Development.
- Oliver Lodge. Demonstrated Survival: Its Influence on Science, Philosophy and Religion.

=== Journal ===
The oldest spiritualist journal in Britain is known as Light. It was formed in January 1881 by Edmund Rogers and became affiliated with the BNAS and its successor organisations.

The College of Psychic Studies publishes the Light journal twice a year.

== Notable historical members ==
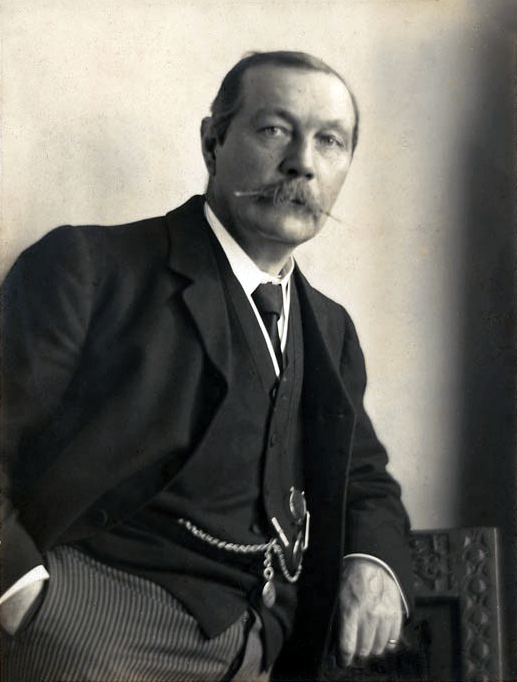
Arthur Conan Doyle, physician and writer

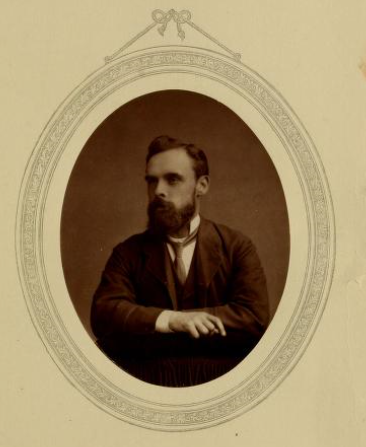
John Stephen Farmer, lexicographer

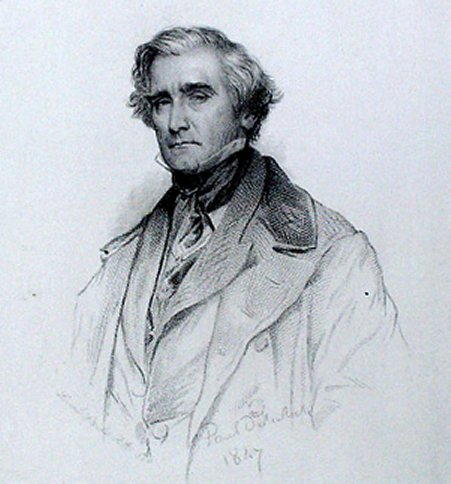
Samuel Carter Hall, journalist

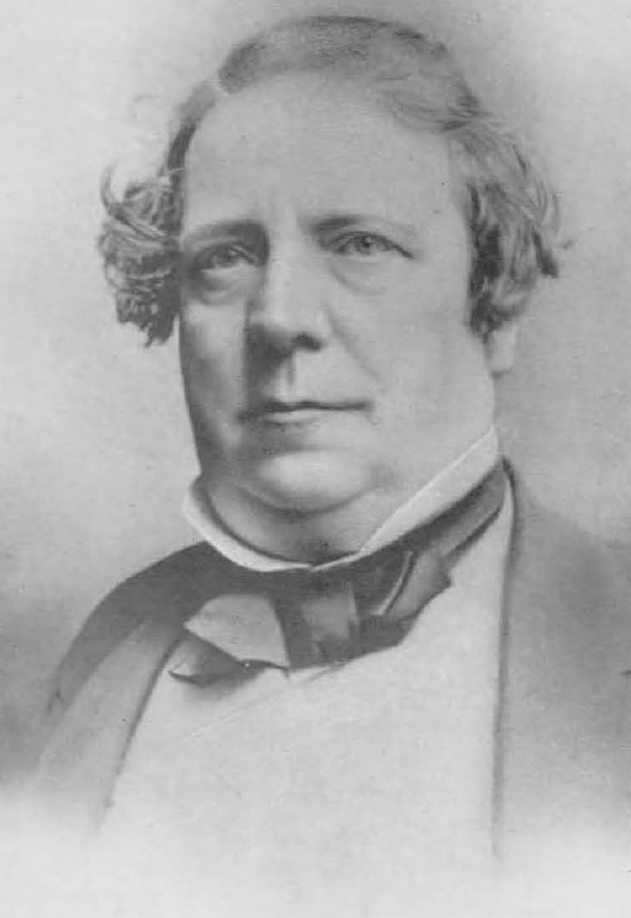
Frederick Hockley, occult writer

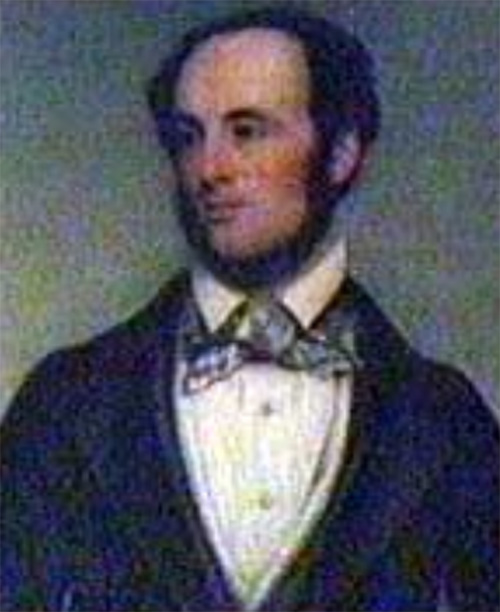
Charles Isham, gardener and landowner

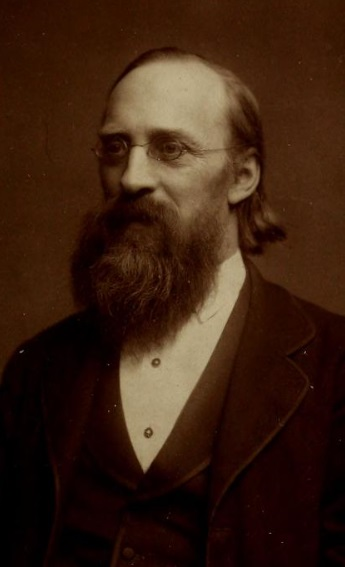
Edmund Dawson Rogers, journalist

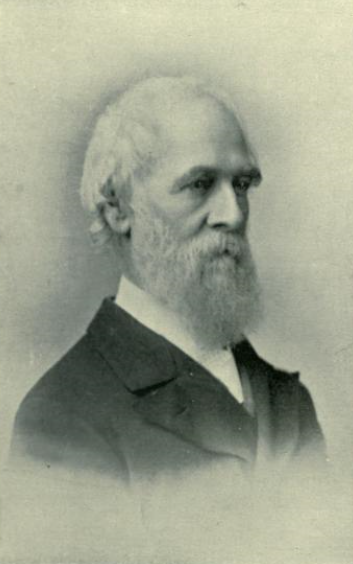
George Wyld, homeopathic physician

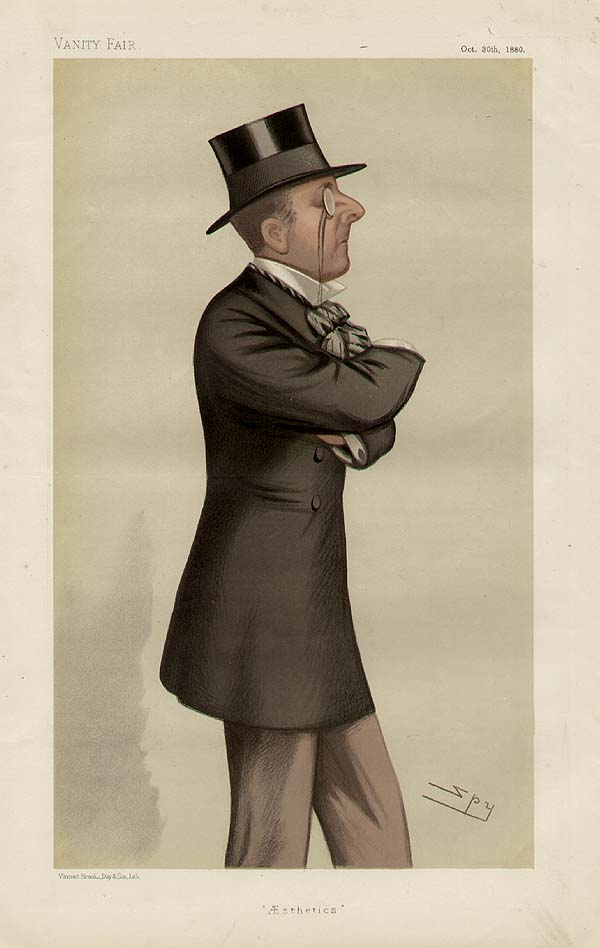
Percy Wyndham, politician
