= Bertram Keightley =

British Theosophist (1860–1944)

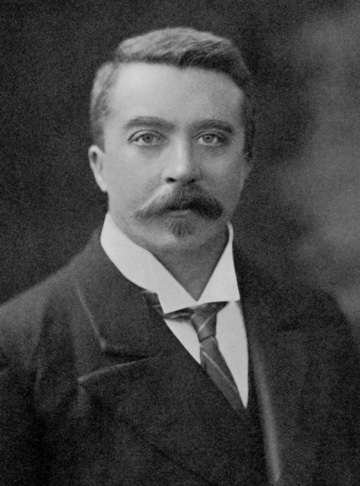
Bertram Keightley c. 1887

Bertram Keightley (4 April 1860 in Birkenhead, England – 31 October 1944), like his nephew Archibald Keightley, was a prominent English Theosophist who helped Helena P. Blavatsky in editing her magnum opus, The Secret Doctrine. He founded the Indian Section of the Theosophical Society and became its first General Secretary from 1897 to 1901. He also served as the General Secretary of the English Section of the Theosophical Society from 1901 to 1905.
