= Katie King (spirit) =

Name given by Spiritualists to an alleged materialized spirit

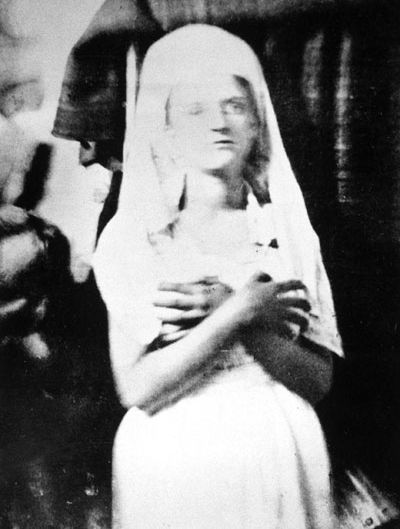
Katie King materialized, photograph of Sir William Crookes.

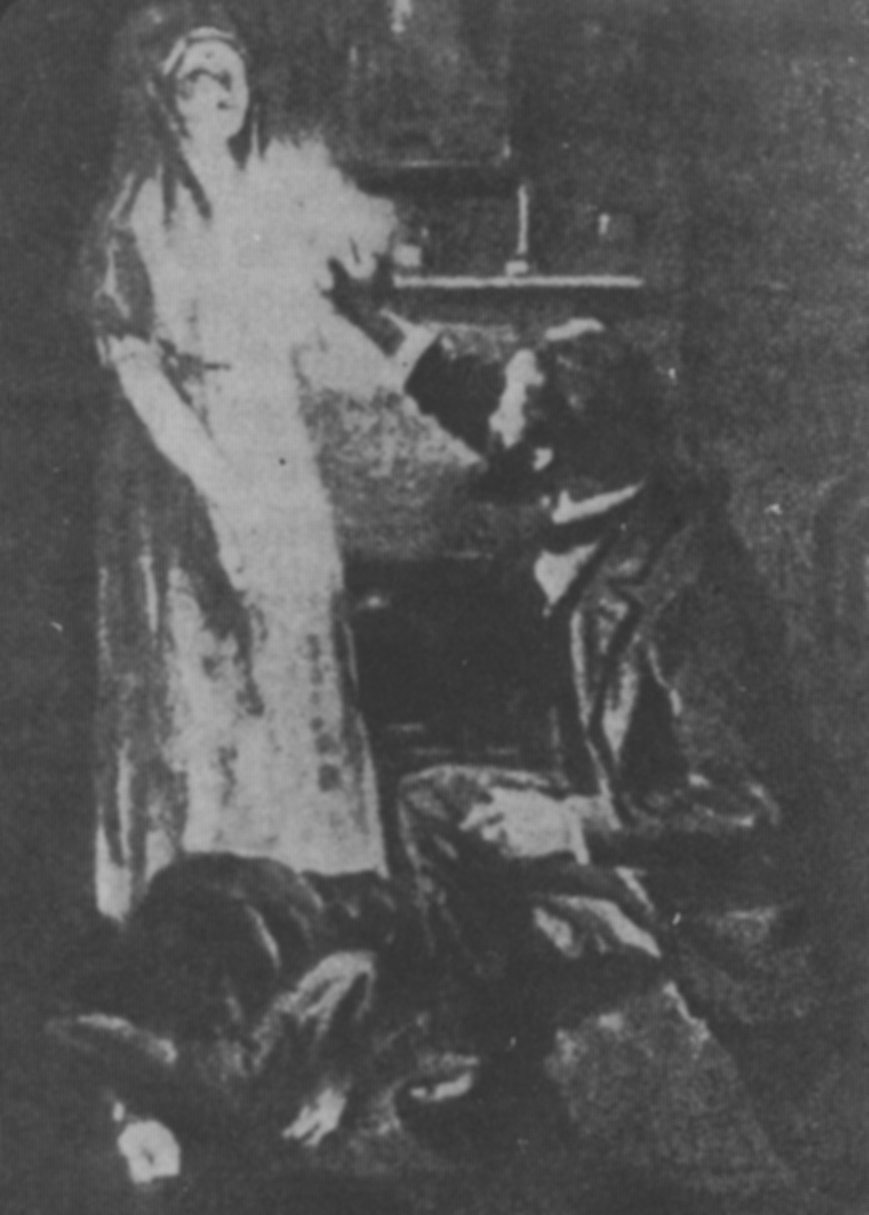
Katie King, Florence Cook and Sir William Crookes

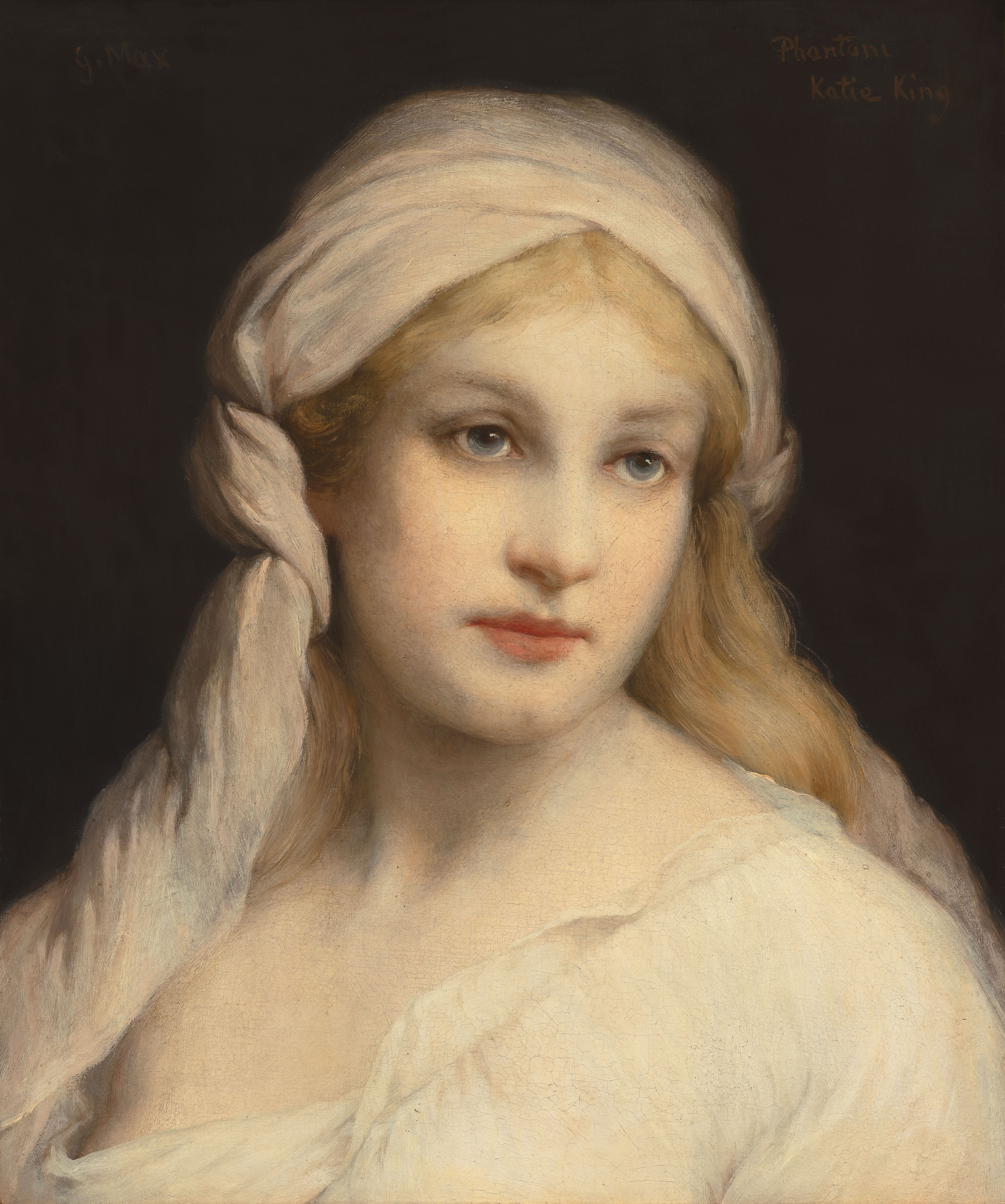
Gabriel von Max, Phantom Katie King, 1897 or earlier, oil on canvas, 44 x 36.7 cm, The Jack Daulton Collection

Katie King was the name given by Spiritualists in the 1870s to what they believed to be a materialized spirit. The question of whether the spirit was real or a fraud was a notable public controversy of the mid-1870s.

The spirit was said to have appeared first between 1871 and 1874 in séances conducted by Florence Cook in London, and later in 1874–1875 in New York in séances held by the mediums Jennie Holmes and her husband Nelson Holmes.

Katie King was believed by Spiritualists to be the daughter of John King, a spirit control of the 1850s through the 1870s that appeared in many séances involving materialized spirits.

A spirit control is a powerful and communicative spirit that organizes the appearance of other spirits at a séance. John King claimed to be the spirit of Henry Morgan, the buccaneer (Doyle 1926: volume 1, 241, 277).

== Florence Cook ==
Florence Cook (ca 1856 – 1904) was a teenage girl who started to claim mediumistic abilities in 1870 and in 1871-2 she developed her abilities under the established mediums Frank Herne and Charles Williams. Herne was associated with the spirit "John King", and Florence became associated with "Katie King", stated to be John King's daughter. Herne was exposed as a fraud in 1875. Katie King developed from appearing as a disembodied face to a fully physical materialisation.

At Hackney on 9 December 1873, lawyer William Volckman attended a séance held by Florence Cook, during which Katie King materialized and, as was customary, held the hands of participants. Suspicious of the spirit's similarity with Cook, Volckman seized the spirit's hand and waist, accusing it of being the medium masquerading as her ghost. The spirit was wrestled from Volckman's grasp by other participants and returned to a cabinet from which Cook emerged some minutes later. Volckman published his opinion that the spirit was a masquerade by Cook. Supporters of Miss Cook denounced Volckman on the grounds that he had broken his agreement to proper etiquette required in the séance, thus negating his credibility as an investigator: Volckman was associated with another medium, Mrs Guppy, who might have wished to denigrate her rival. Moreover, it was argued that since spirits borrowed energy and matter from their medium, it was not surprising that Katie King resembled Cook. Despite the defence of their position, Cook and her supporters were hurt by this incident — newspapers were referring to it as an "exposure" — and sought further support for their position. To this end, they turned to Crookes, who was a prominent and respected scientist.

Between 1871 and 1874, Sir William Crookes investigated the preternatural phenomena produced by Spiritualist mediums. He described the conditions he imposed on mediums as follows: "It must be at my own house, and my own selection of friends and spectators, under my own conditions, and I may do whatever I like as regards apparatus" (Doyle 1926: volume 1, 177).

A 15-year-old Cook, alone in Crookes's house with Crookes's friends and family as witnesses, was said to have materialized the spirit of Katie King, who walked about, talked, allowed herself to be weighed and measured, and even held the family's baby (Doyle 1926: volume 1, 241). On one occasion, at a joint seance in Crookes's home in March 1874, Katie King was seen in company with "Florence Maple", a spirit materialised by the medium Mary Showers who was exposed as a fraud shortly thereafter. The sessions were held with the medium secluded in the dark, because Spiritualists believe that materialization requires very dim surroundings to succeed, though occasionally the spirits materialised in the light and some photographs were taken. As is apparently typical of materialized spirits, Katie's exact height and weight varied, though Katie was always taller than Florence Cook, with a larger face, and different hair and skin. According to those present, the two were both visible at the same moments, so that Florence could not have assumed the role of the spirit (Doyle 1926: volume 1, 235–240).

The final appearances of Katie King in connection with Florence Cook took place in April and May 1874 at the Cook family home in Hackney. The audiences were invited to sit in a parlour opening onto a bedroom, in which Florence would start her trance. After some time Katie King would emerge. At some point the audience would be shown a figure, apparently Florence, lying on the floor of the bedroom with her head covered by a shawl while Katie King was still visible in the parlour. A number of the witnesses, such as Edward W. Cox, recorded their doubts about the proceedings, while others claimed that they had seen the two clearly, such as Crookes and Florence Marryat, who claimed that she had seen Katie naked in Florence's company.

Crookes's report, published in 1874, contained his assertion that Florence Cook, as well as the mediums Kate Fox and Daniel Dunglas Home, were producing genuine preternatural phenomena (Crookes 1874). The publication caused an uproar, and his testimony about Katie King was considered the most outrageous and sensational part of the report.

Her story was told in season 21, episode 8 of Mysteries at the Museum.

== Jennie and Nelson Holmes ==
After news of Katie King had spread abroad, the American mediums Jennie and Nelson Holmes also claimed to have materialized her. Robert Dale Owen, the politician and avowed Spiritualist, had experienced this materialization and wrote about it in an article for the Atlantic Monthly in January 1875.

Just as the article was going to press, however, a woman named Eliza White stepped forward and claimed to have masqueraded as Katie. White's face matched that of "Katie King" in photographs sold by the Holmeses and their agents. Both the Atlantic Monthly and Owen admitted in public to being duped. Arthur Conan Doyle maintains that this "exposure" did more damage to Spiritualism than any other exposure of the period (Doyle 1926: volume 1, 269–277).

Investigations conducted by leading Spiritualist Henry Steel Olcott in 1875 re-established the credibility of the Holmeses in the eyes of many Spiritualists. The story eventually accepted by most Spiritualists was that Eliza White had been hired to pose as Katie King for a photograph to sell to the public. The Holmeses had not wanted to photograph the real Katie King, since bright light would have ruined the materialization. Once involved, Eliza White first extorted money from the Holmeses, and then sold the story to the press. (Doyle 1926: volume 1, 269–277).
