= Run it up the flagpole =

Catchphrase popular in the United States

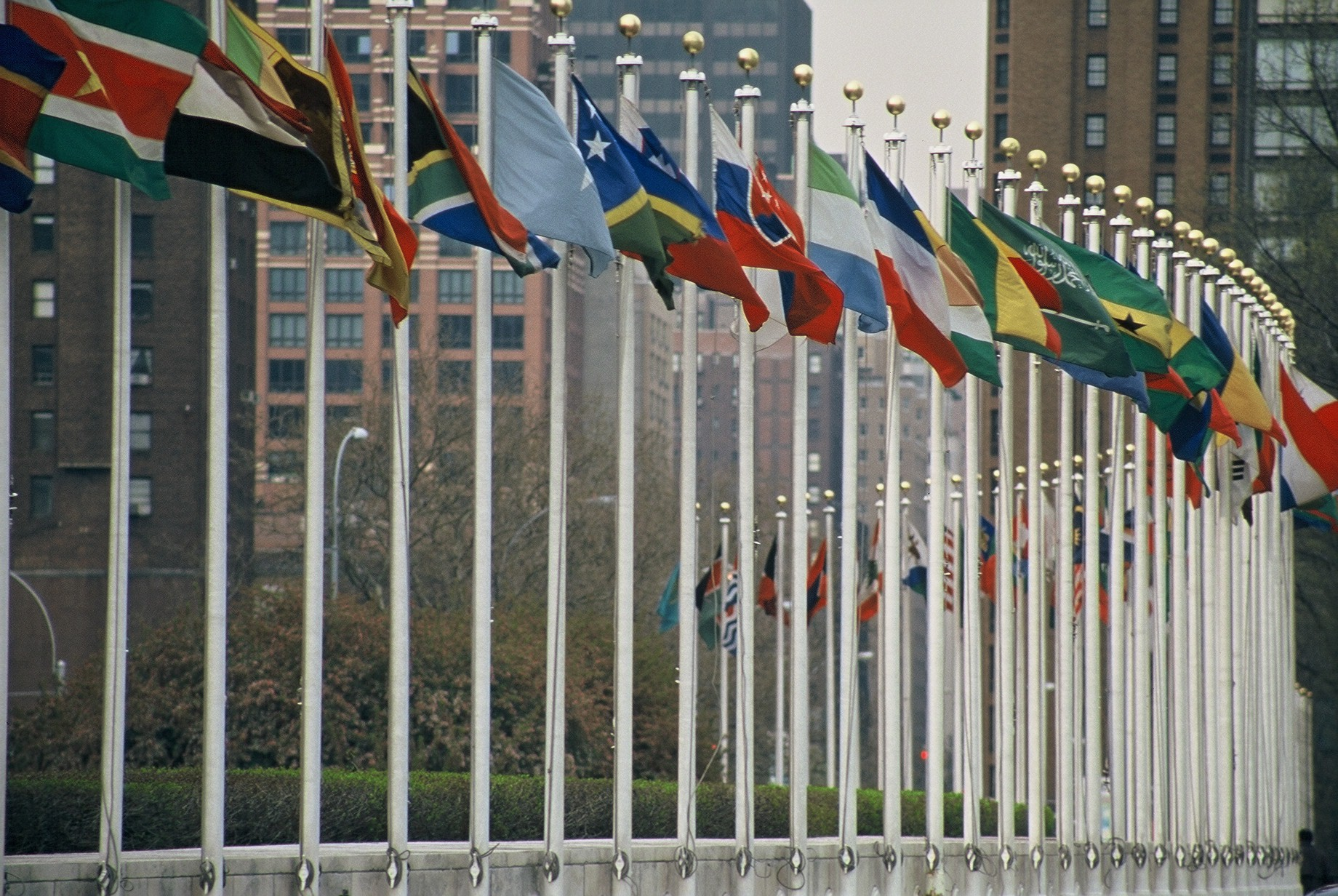

Let's run it up the flagpole and see if anyone salutes it is a catchphrase which became popular in the United States during the late 1950s and early 1960s. It means "to present an idea tentatively and see whether it receives a favorable reaction". It is now considered a cliché. Sometimes it is used seriously, but more often it is used humorously, with the intention that it be recognized as both hackneyed and outdated. An equivalent phrase is "to send up a trial balloon". While the phrase hadn't run its course in the lexicon, the band Harvey Danger brought it back to the forefront for a new generation with the song "Flagpole Sitta," which includes the lyric "When I feel a bit naughty, I run it up the flagpole and see who salutes – but no one ever does."

== Background ==
The phrase was associated with the advertising agencies then located on Madison Avenue in New York, and with the "men in the grey flannel suits". Comedians, when mocking corporate culture, were certain to use it, along with expressions such as the whole ball of wax and the use of invented words adding the suffix -wise (e.g. "We've had a good year, revenue wise").

The phrase was also used as an ice breaker between serious moments in the motion picture 12 Angry Men starring Henry Fonda. The line was delivered by Juror no. 12, an advertising executive played by Robert Webber.

In Stan Freberg's 1961 comedy album, Stan Freberg Presents the United States of America Volume One: The Early Years, General George Washington, after having just received the nation's new flag from seamstress Betsy Ross, announces that he'll just "run it up the flagpole... see if anyone salutes."

In Allan Sherman captured the essence of this phrase in his 1963 album My Son, the Celebrity, with a parody of Gilbert and Sullivan's "When I Was a Lad". In Sherman's lyrics, the narrator joins an advertising firm:

I worked real hard for the dear old firm,
I learned most every advertising term.
I said to the men in the dark gray suits,
"Let's run it up the flagpole and see who salutes."

In a double entendre reflecting the narrator's mental dissonance, the group Harvey Danger used the phrase in their 1997 song "Flagpole Sitta":

Fingertips have memories,
Mine can't forget the curves of your body
And when I feel a bit naughty
I run it up the flagpole and see who salutes
(But no one ever does)

As it became hackneyed, it got a second life as a launching point for the invention of joking variations, such as "Let's drop it in the pool and see if it makes a splash", "Let's throw it against the wall and see if it sticks", "Let's put it in a saucer and see if the cat licks it up", and "Let's put it on the five-fifteen and see if it gets off at Westport" (i.e., let's put it on a New York City commuter train and find out whether it is destined for Westport, Connecticut, a town thought to be the home of many successful executives).

== See also ==
- Trial balloon
