= Karl, Freiherr von Prel =

German philosopher (1839–1899)

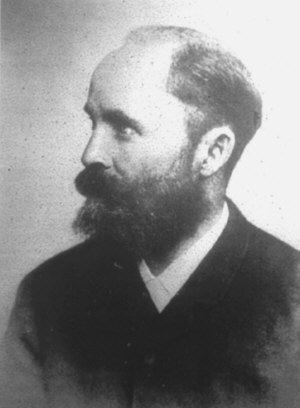
Karl, Freiherr von Prel

Karl Ludwig August Friedrich Maximilian Alfred, Freiherr von Prel, or, in French, Carl Ludwig August Friedrich Maximilian Alfred, Baron du Prel (3 April 1839 Landshut, Germany – 4 August 1899 Heiligkreuz, Austria), was a German philosopher and writer on mysticism and the occult. In the literature it has become customary to refer to him under various abbreviated French forms of his name, usually "Carl Du Prel", "Baron Carl Du Prel" or simply "Baron Du Prel".

== Biography ==
He was born at Landshut. After studying at the Ludwig-Maximilians-Universität München he served in the Bavarian army from 1859 to 1872, when he retired with the rank of captain. He then gave himself up to philosophical work, especially in connection with the phenomena of hypnotism and occultism from the modern psychological standpoint. In 1868 he received the degree of doctor from the University of Tübingen in recognition of a treatise on the psychology of dreams (Oneirokritikon. Der Traum vom Standpunkt des transcendentalen Idealismus). Following this achievement, he became something of a protege to Eduard von Hartmann, promoting and vigorously defending his work Philosophy of the Unconscious (1869).

Du Prel sought to combine early parapsychological research and Kantian transcendental idealism to argue that mystical experiences were universal and subjective, paralleling a similar argument made by William James. He attempted to deduce the existence of spirit, apart from, and yet entering from time to time into connection with, the phenomena of the senses, by an examination of the relation between the ego of thought and the age of sensible experience as understood by Immanuel Kant.

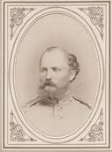
Carl Freiherr du Prel, in 1867

In Der Kampf ums Dasein am Himmel, Du Prel endeavoured to apply the Darwinian doctrine of biological evolution not only to the sphere of consciousness but also even more widely as the philosophical principle of the world. He was one of a large number of German thinkers who, during the latter half of the nineteenth century, endeavored to treat the mind as a mechanism. His interest in Darwinism was also tied to a belief in extraterrestrial life.

Although today regarded mostly as an obscure figure in the history of occultism, in his own lifetime Du Prel was widely respected as a scientist and philosopher. The fourth edition of Sigmund Freud's The Interpretation of Dreams (1914) positively cites Du Prel as both a mystic and one whose conclusions parallel and apply Freud's work. His Die Philosophie der Mystik was an influence on August Strindberg's play A Dream Play.

== Works ==
- Der gesunde Menschenverstand vor den Problemen der Wissenschaft (1872)
- Der Kampf ums Dasein am Himmel (1874) (republished in 1882 under the title Entwickelungsgeschichte des Weltalls)
- Die Planetenbewohner and die Nebularhypothese (1880)
- Die Philosophie der Mystik (1885)
- Justinus Kerner und die Seherin von Prevorst (1886)
- Die monistische Seelenlehre (1888)
- Die Mystik der alten Griechen (1888)
- Kants mystische Weltanschauung (1889)
- Studien aus dem Gebiete der Geheimwissenschaften (1890)
- Der Spiritismus (1893)
- Die Entdeckung der Seele durch die Geheimwissenschaften (1894–1895)
