= Staffordshire Mercury =

The Staffordshire Mercury was a weekly regional newspaper published in Staffordshire, England.

The publication was founded in 1824 by Thomas Allbut, with the Rev. Leonard Abington as its first editor. It was later renamed The Potteries Mercury at some point.

The paper became the North Staffordshire Mercury in March 1834 but returned to being named the Staffordshire Mercury in April 1845. The paper probably folded in May 1848.

The Staffordshire Mercury's notable journalists include Edmund Rogers (1840s)
