= Archibald Keightley =

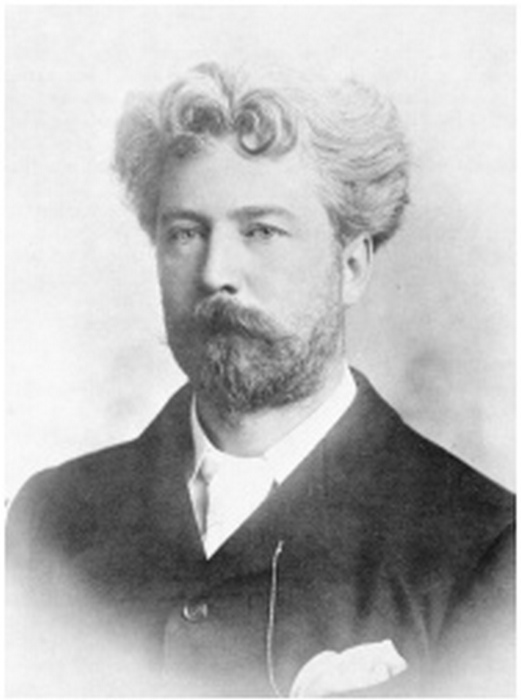
- Archibald Keightley in his early years
- Born: 19 April 1859; Sedgwick, Westmorland, UK
- Died: 18 November 1930; New York City
- Known for: Theosophist
- Spouse: Julia van der Planck

Archibald Keightley (19 April 1859 – 18 November 1930) was an English physician and Theosophist.

== Biography ==
Keightley was educated at Pembroke College, Cambridge. In 1886, he obtained a degree from the Royal College of Physicians in London. He was a Fellow of the Royal College of Surgeons and Master of Arts and Doctor of Medicine from Cambridge.

He joined the Theosophical Society in 1884. In the London Lodge of the TS at the time were: A.P. Sinnett, Dr. Anna Kingsford, William Kingsland, Prof. William Crookes, Frank Podmore, F.W.H. Myers, Edmund Gurney, Charles Massey.

Keightley was a prominent member of the TS who helped in the editing of Helena P. Blavatsky's magnum opus, The Secret Doctrine. He served as the General Secretary of the English Theosophical Society from 1888 to 1890. He was married to Julia van der Planck a.k.a. "Jasper Niemand", the author of a number of Theosophical tracts. Bertram Keightley, his uncle (although younger by one year), was also a Theosophist.

He later sided with William Quan Judge and his American branch over that led by Annie Besant, and then the faction associated with Ernest Temple Hargrove over that led by Katherine Tingley. After the death of his wife, he relocated to New York City, where he participated in the activities of the "Hargrove" branch until his death in 1930.

== Selected publications ==
- The Recovery of Health: With a Chapter on the Salisbury Treatment (1890)
- Karma and Free Will (1891)
- The Natural Law of Altruism (1891)
- Dr. Archibald Keightley’s Account of the Writing of The Secret Doctrine (1893)
- Brotherhood – a Fact in Nature (1897)
- Health and Disease (1897)
