= Trial balloon =

Information given to media to assess an audience's reaction

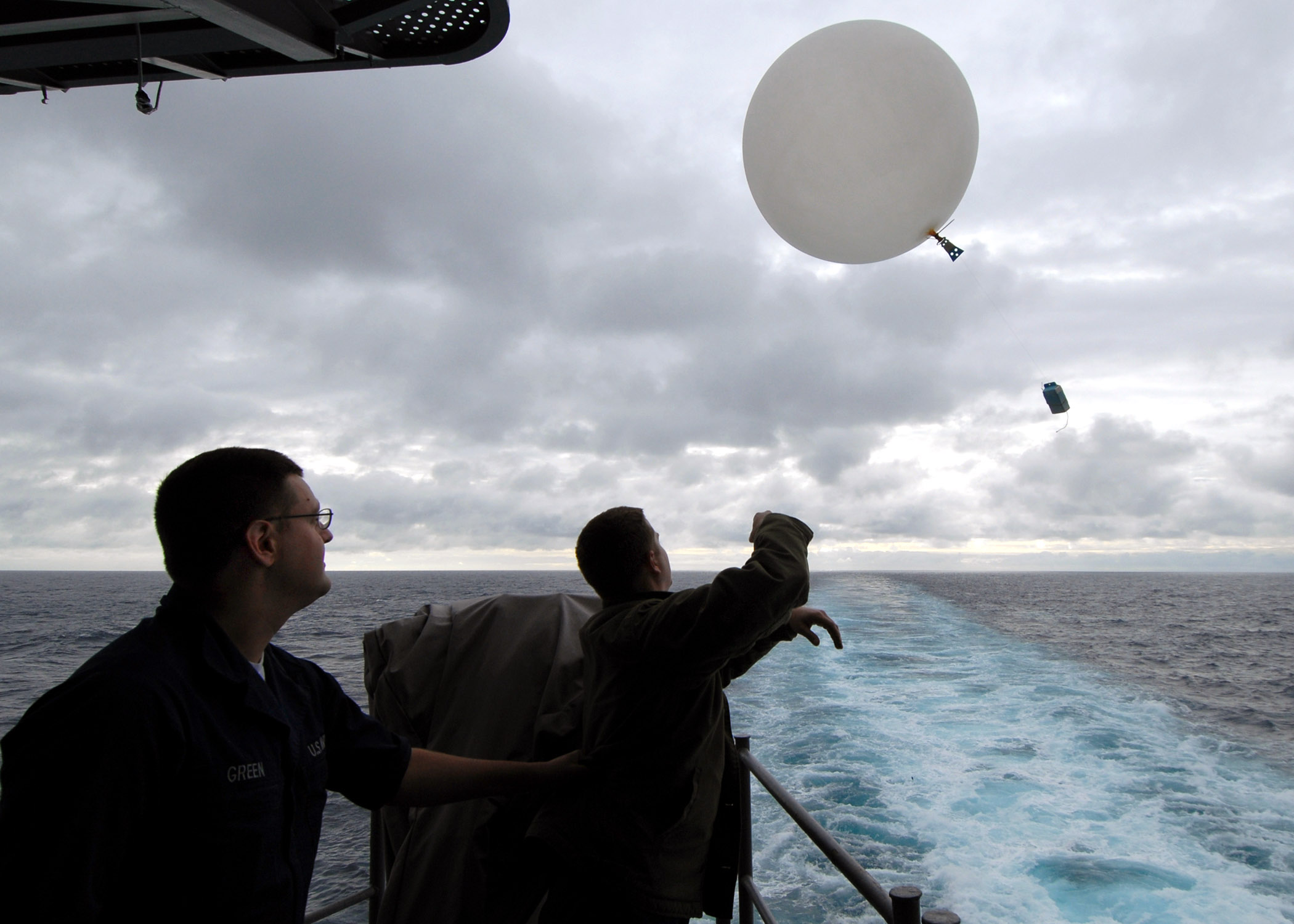
Launching a trial balloon

A trial balloon, or kite-flying (used in the UK and elsewhere), is information sent out to the media in order to observe the reaction of an audience. It is used by companies sending out press releases to judge customer reaction, and by politicians who deliberately leak information on a policy change. The term is of French origin. Trial balloon translates French ballon d'essai, which was a small balloon sent up immediately before a manned ascent to determine the direction and tendency of winds. Its earliest use in English is figurative.

For example, a company might announce a new computer program to be delivered in a year, and then read the press coverage for hints on whether or not the product will have market appeal. If the coverage is favourable the money is spent on development, but if not the project can be cancelled before consuming resources. A trial balloon under the company's own name is somewhat risky; if too many are "floated" the company risks becoming known as unserious, and its announcements are ignored. In addition, the company can find that the planned product is unworkable, leading to the phenomenon of vaporware.

== United States ==
In politics, trial balloons often take the form of an intentional news "leak". An example was when The New York Times reported in mid-June 2012 that Governor Andrew Cuomo and his staff were deliberating on a plan to restrict hydrofracking to five counties in the Southern Tier of New York where the Marcellus shale is deepest and drilling is least likely to pollute well water supplies in those aquifers. Because the proposed change in New York energy law was controversial, the Albany Times Union the next day published a front-page, above-the-fold story questioning the plan's leak as a "trial balloon" in the headline, which quickly garnered criticism and support.

In American slang, the phrase "run it up the flagpole and see who salutes" (i.e., to raise an issue and see the reaction) is a form of trial balloon.

== United Kingdom ==
An early British example came in 1885 when Herbert Gladstone, son of Liberal Party leader William Ewart Gladstone, wrote a letter to The Times stating support for Irish Home Rule. This was dubbed the Hawarden Kite after Hawarden Castle, the Gladstone family home. Historians are uncertain whether this was co-ordinated between the Gladstones, but the reaction was sufficiently sympathetic that Gladstone publicly committed himself and his party to the policy.

== Ireland ==
Minister for Justice Brian Lenihan suggested in the 1960s that Ireland join the Commonwealth of Nations. He did so on the instructions of the Taoiseach, Seán Lemass. However, the Irish and general reaction was hostile, and Lemass and Lenihan both agreed to abandon the idea, claiming that Lenihan had been speaking theoretically in a personal capacity and not for his government.

== See also ==
- "Run it up the flagpole"
- "Will it play in Peoria?"
- Exploratory committee
- Stalking horse
- Overton Window
