= John Stephen Farmer =

British lexicographer, spiritualist and writer

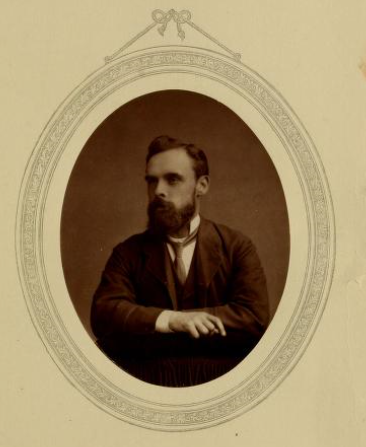
- Born: 7 March 1854
- Died: 18 January 1916 (aged 61)
- Occupation(s): Lexicographer, spiritualist

John Stephen Farmer (7 March 1854 – 18 January 1916) also known as J. S. Farmer was a British lexicographer, spiritualist and writer. He was most well known for his seven volume dictionary of slang.

== Career ==
Farmer was born in Bedford. His lifetime work was Slang and its Analogues published in seven volumes (1890–1904) with William Ernest Henley.

Farmer took interest in psychical research and spiritualism. He was the first editor for the spiritualist journal Light. From 1878, he also edited the Psychological Review, a spiritualist periodical. Farmer was a member of the London Spiritualist Alliance.

Farmer defended the medium William Eglinton from accusations of fraud and in 1886 wrote a biography about Eglinton.

== Publications ==
- Spiritualism as a New Basis of Belief (1880)
- A New Basis of Belief in Immortality (1882)
- How to Investigate Spiritualism (1883)
- Twixt Two Worlds: A Narrative of the Life and Work of William Eglinton (1886)
- Americanisms, Old and New. A Dictionary of Words, Phrases, and Colloquialisms peculiar to the United States, British America, the West Indies, &c., &c., Their Derivation, Meaning, and Application, together with numerous Anecdotal, Historical, Explanatory, and Folk-lore Notes (1889)
- Slang and its Analogues Past and Present: A Dictionary, Historical and Comparative, of the Heterodox Speech of All Classes of Society for more than Three Hundred Years With Synonyms in English, French, German, Italian, Etc (Seven volumes, 1890–1904) [with William Ernest Henley]
