= Charles Massey =

British barrister, Christian mystic and psychical researcher

Charles Carleton Massey (1838–1905), most well known as C. C. Massey, was a British barrister, Christian mystic and psychical researcher.

Massey was born at Hackwood Park, Basingstoke. He was the first president of the British Theosophical Society and a founding member of the Society for Psychical Research in 1882. His father was William Nathaniel Massey. His main interest was Christian Theosophy; he was influenced by the writings of Jakob Böhme.

Massey, a convinced spiritualist, was associated with the medium Stainton Moses. He was also a member of the British National Association of Spiritualists and The Ghost Club.

Massey had defended the medium Henry Slade against the accusations of fraud from Ray Lankester. In 1880 he translated Johann Karl Friedrich Zöllner's Transcendental Physics into English.

== Publications ==
- C. C. Massey. (1909). Thoughts of a Modern Mystic. A Selection from the Writings of the Late C. C. Massey, ed. William F. Barrett (London: Regan Paul, Trench & Co).
