= London Lodge =

English lodge of the Theosophical Society

The London Lodge (also London Lodge of the Theosophical Society) was an English lodge of the Theosophical Society. Until the 1910s, the lodge was an important part of the theosophical movement.

== History ==
The London Lodge was founded on 27 June 1878 in London by Charles Carleton Massey (1838-1905) under the name British Theosophical Society of the Arya Samaj of Aryavart. Apart from unofficial lodges in places like Liverpool or Korfu, the London Lodge was the first official lodge of the Theosophical Society since the foundation of the society in 1875. The new society, which was often abbreviated as British Theosophical Society or British TS was also affiliated with the Hindu reform movement "Arya Samaj". In 1882, the Arya Samaj and the TS separated, and the name of the lodge was changed to British Theosophical Society.

On 3 June 1883 the name of the lodge was changed to London Lodge of the Theosophical Society, usually written as London Lodge TS or simply London Lodge. In February 1909, the lodge separated for a short time from the TS, and changed its name to The Eleusinian Society during this time. In spring 1911, the lodge became again part of the TS, and changed its name back to London Lodge.

The first president of the British TS was Charles Carleton Massey from 27 June 1878 to 6 January 1883. After 7 January 1883 Anna Kingsford was president, under her leadership the lodge changed its name to "London Lodge" on 3 June 1883.

In April/May 1883 Alfred Percy Sinnett became a member of the London Lodge. In autumn 1883, the London lodge separated into two parts, the followers of Sinnett, and the followers of Kingsford. On 6 (7?) April 1884 Gerard B. Finch was elected as president. But Sinnett remained the most important figure in the lodge, which was often known as "Sinnett's London Lodge". He became the President of the Lodge in January 1885.

14 members of the London Lodge founded in May 1887 the Blavatsky Lodge, the second official theosophical Society in England, and the third in Europe after the Loge Germania in Germany. In December 1888, the British Section of the Theosophical Society was founded. But the London Lodge remained autonomous. In 1890 Blavatsky founded the European Section of the Theosophical Society, of which the London Lodge was only nominally a member.

Charles Webster Leadbeater became, on 21 November 1883, a member of the London Lodge. Because of the Leadbeater scandal, the London Lodge separated itself from the TS in February 1909 for two years, and temporarily changed its name to The Eleusinian Society. In spring 1911, the lodge became again part of the TS under its earlier name London Lodge.
