= William Eglinton =

British spiritualist medium

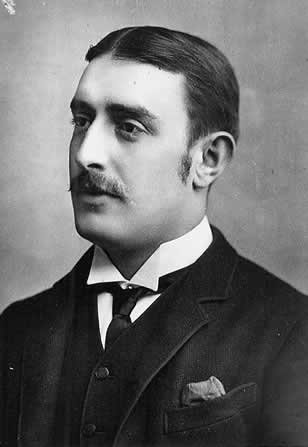
William Eglinton

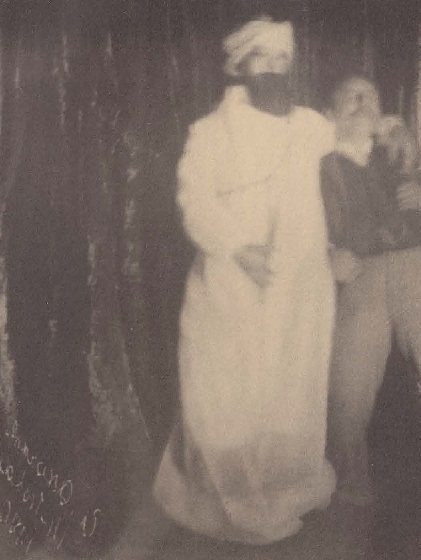
Eglinton with "Abdullah"

William Eglinton (1857–1933), also known as William Eglington, was a British spiritualist medium who was exposed as a fraud.

== Biography ==
Eglinton was born in Islington, London. He claimed to materialize spirits in his séances. It was discovered that the materializations were fakes.

Eglinton was briefly successful as a medium, which was largely because he was endorsed by Charles Richet. However, in 1876, Eglinton was exposed as a fraud when the psychical researcher Thomas Colley seized the "spirit" materialization known as "Abdullah" and cut off a portion of its cloak. It was discovered that the cut piece matched a cloth found in Eglinton's suitcase. Colley also pulled the beard off the materialization and it was revealed to be a fake, the same as another one found in the suitcase of Eglinton. In 1886 the spiritualist John Stephen Farmer wrote a supportive biography of Eglinton.

Eglinton performed slate writing mediumship and his leading critics were the psychical researchers Eleanor Sidgwick and Richard Hodgson. In 1886 and 1887 a series of publications by S. J. Davey, Hodgson and Sidgwick in the Journal for the Society for Psychical Research exposed the slate writing tricks of Eglinton. Due to the critical papers, Stainton Moses and other prominent spiritualist members resigned from the SPR.

Hereward Carrington has written that Eglinton was involved with Madame Blavatsky in producing fraudulent Mahatma letters. Frank Podmore wrote that "Eglinton had on at least two occasions been detected in fraudulently simulating occult phenomena... Moreover, several observers claimed to have seen Eglinton actually writing on the slates with his own hands." Professor Carvill Lewis during a séance with Eglinton heard him write on the slates and observed writing movements. Lewis had also discovered that Eglinton had looked up answers to questions in a dictionary.

== Alleged levitation ==
In 1882, the American magician Harry Kellar was baffled by an alleged levitation of Eglinton. Massimo Polidoro has written that Kellar did not "impose any form of control" and "couldn't see anything" in the dark séance room but still convinced himself Eglinton levitated. According to the magician Harry Houdini although Kellar was originally baffled by Eglinton's levitation when he gave the subject fuller consideration he was able to reproduce the same phenomena by trickery. Houdini wrote "it was not strange that Kellar did not detect Eglinton's method instantly nor is it strange that he acknowledged that he was baffled. No magician is immune from being deceived and it is no way beneath a magician's dignity or demeaning to professional reputation to openly admit that he cannot always account for what he thinks he sees." Magic historian Barry Wiley wrote that Eglinton was exposed as a fraud several years later.

== See also ==
- Francis Ward Monck
