= William Stainton Moses =

English spiritualist medium

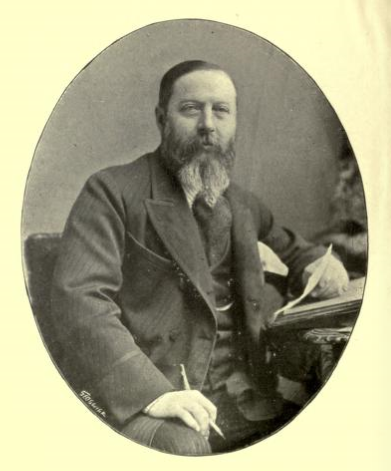
- Born: 1839; Donington, England
- Died: 5 September 1892
- Occupation: Spiritualist medium

William Stainton Moses (1839 – 5 September 1892) was an English cleric and spiritualist medium. He promoted spirit photography and automatic writing, and co-founded what became the College of Psychic Studies. He resisted scientific examination of his claims, which have generally been demolished.

== Life ==
Moses was born in Donington near Lincoln. He was educated at Bedford School, University College School, London and Exeter College, Oxford. He was ordained as a priest of the Church of England by Bishop Samuel Wilberforce in 1870.

Moses attended his first séance with Lottie Fowler in 1872. Charles Williams and Daniel Dunglas Home were the next mediums he visited. Five months after his introduction to spiritualism, he claimed to have experienced levitation. The automatic scripts of Moses began to appear in his books Spirit Teachings and Spirit Identity. The scripts date from 1872 to 1883 and fill 24 notebooks. All but one have been preserved by the London Spiritualist Alliance.

Moses published Psychography. A Treatise on One of the Objective Forms of Psychic or Spiritual Phenomena in 1878. In it, he coins the term "psychography" (from psycho and graphy) for the spiritualist concept of channeling messages from the dead via automatic writing (also known as "independent writing", "direct writing" or "spirit writing").

Moses was one of the first vice-presidents of the Society for Psychical Research (SPR). Other early members included Frederic W. H. Myers, Henry Sidgwick and Edmund Gurney. In 1886 and 1887 in a series of publications the SPR exposed the tricks of the medium William Eglinton. Because of this, some spiritualist members including Moses resigned from the SPR.

Moses endorsed the spirit photography of Édouard Isidore Buguet, however, Buguet was exposed as a fraud. Moses had supported Buguet in an article for Human Nature in May 1875. After Burguet was exposed later in the same year, Moses insisted that Buguet was still a genuine medium and he had been bribed to make a false confession. The case has been cited by researchers as an example of spiritualists willing to believe and refusing to accept evidence of fraud.

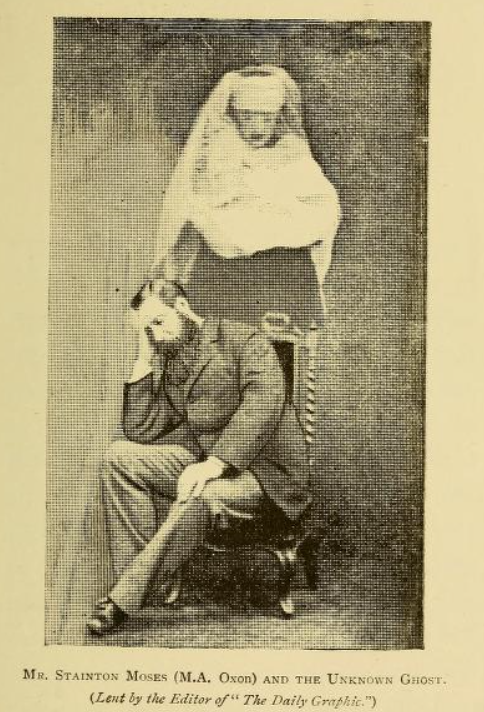
Spirit photograph featuring Moses.

In 1884, Moses was a founding member, together with Rogers, of the London Spiritualist Alliance, afterwards the College of Psychic Studies.

Moses died on 5 September 1892.

== Reception ==
Moses performed in dark conditions only with a small select circle of friends, he did not allow psychical researchers to attend his séances and refused to be tested. The psychical researcher Frank Podmore wrote:

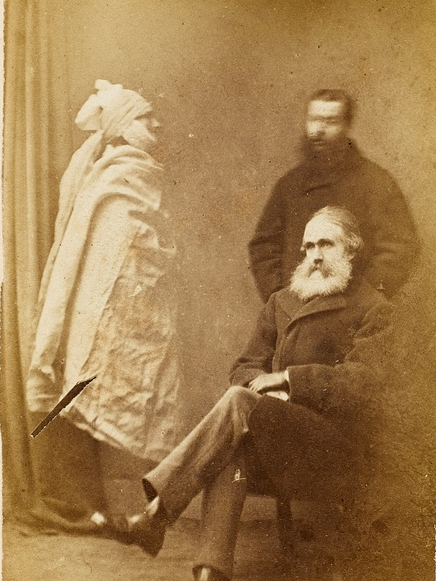
Alleged spirit photograph featuring Stanhope Templeman Speer (sitting) and William Stainton Moses (standing) with his 'spirit' control Rector.

It seems reasonable to conclude that all the marvels reported at [Moses] seances were, in fact, produced by the medium's own hands: that it was he who tilted the table and produced the raps, that the scents, the seed pearls, and the Parian statuettes were brought into the room in his pockets: and that the spirit lights were, in fact, nothing more than bottles of phosphorised oil. Nor would the feats described have required any special skill on the medium's part.

It was suggested that Moses looked up obituaries, daily newspapers, biographies or The Annual Register to research the history of deceased people. Joseph McCabe described Moses as a "deliberate impostor" and wrote that his apports and all of his feats were the result of trickery. Science historian Sherrie Lynne Lyons wrote that the glowing or light-emitting hands in séances could easily be explained by the rubbing of oil of phosphorus on the hands. Moses was caught twice with a bottle of phosphorus.

A psychologist Théodore Flournoy wrote that before admitting a supernatural explanation for the automatic writings of Moses, "we must first of all be sure that he himself was not capable of elaborating them subconsciously. To my mind, he was quite capable." Many of Moses's statements about ancient history have proven to be false.

Researcher Georgess McHargue has suggested that Moses' mediumship was the result of self-suggestion and unconscious trickery.

The first documented instance of cryptomnesia occurred in 1874 with Moses, after his described spiritual contact with a pair of dead Indian brothers matched a newspaper report from the week before, and despite his claimed communication he could ascertain no details not given in that report. Researchers concluded that Moses had read the story but forgotten that he had read it, instead mistaking the partial memory for a message from the spirit world.

== Publications ==
Under the pen name "M.A. Oxon", Moses published the following books on spiritualism:

- Spirit Identity (1879)
- Psychography (1882)
- Spirit Teachings (1883)
- Higher Aspects of Spiritualism (1880)

Moses also edited the periodical Light and wrote on spiritualism for Human Nature.

== Sources ==
- Rigg, James McMullen (1912). "Moses, William Stainton" . In Lee, Sidney (ed.). Dictionary of National Biography (2nd supplement). London: Smith, Elder & Co. p. 180.
- The Controls of Stainton Moses by A. W. Trethewy
- Life and Experiences of Edmund Dawson Rogers, Spiritualist and Journalist (autobiography, 1911, new edition by Kessinger Publishing, London, 2004) ISBN 1-4191-7303-0
- Frank Podmore. (1902). Modern Spiritualism: A History and a Criticism. Volume 2. Methuen & Company. Chapter The Mediumship of Stainton Moses. pp. 270–288
- J. M. Rigg; rev. H. C. G. Matthew. "Moses, William Stainton (1839–1892)". Oxford Dictionary of National Biography (online ed.). Oxford University Press. doi:10.1093/ref:odnb/19396. (Subscription or UK public library membership required.)
