= Automatic writing =

Claimed psychic ability

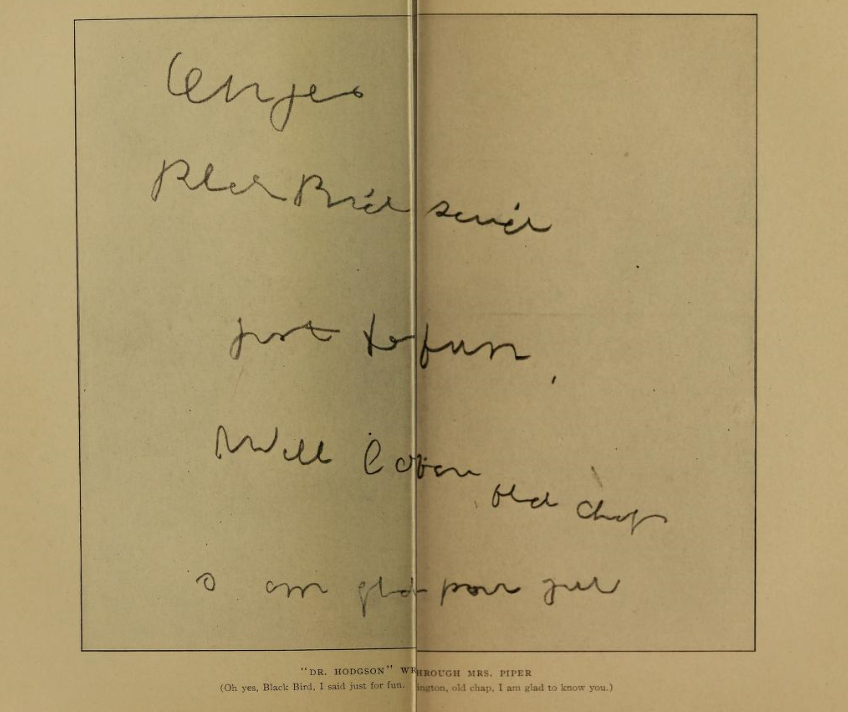
A piece of automatic writing produced by trance medium Leonora Piper, claimed to be a message from the spirit of Richard Hodgson

Automatic writing, also called psychography, is a claimed psychic ability allowing a person to produce written words without consciously writing. Practitioners engage in automatic writing by holding a writing instrument and allowing alleged spirits to manipulate the practitioner's hand. The instrument may be a standard writing instrument, or it may be one specially designed for automatic writing, such as a planchette or a ouija board.

Religious and spiritual traditions have incorporated automatic writing, including Fuji in Chinese folk religion and the Enochian language associated with Enochian magic. In the modern era, it is associated with Spiritualism and the occult, with notable practitioners including W. B. Yeats and Arthur Conan Doyle. Claims associated with automatic writing are unfalsifiable, while some documented examples result from the ideomotor phenomenon.

== History ==
Spirit writing, later called fuji (扶乩/扶箕), has a long tradition in China, where messages from various deities and spirits were received by mediums since the Song dynasty. In the 19th century, messages received through spirit writing led to the foundation of several Chinese salvationist religions. The spread of Chinese cultural techniques, such as printing and painting, introduced the influence of "spirit writing", practised by Japanese Zen Ōbaku monks, who were said to communicate with an ancient Taoist sage credited with creating the kung fu system.

13th-century Spanish Kabbalists engaged in automatic writing, which may have been the method that produced the Zohar. The angelic mentor of Joseph Karo (1488�–1575) supposedly communicated via automatic writing on at least one occasion, dictating laws of Kiddush levana.

Another early Western example of the practice is the 16th-century Enochian language, allegedly dictated to John Dee and Edward Kelley by Enochian angels and integral to the practice of Enochian magic. The language is said to be extremely detailed and complex in its grammar and rules. Dee also claimed that the Enochian instruction included information regarding the elixir of life in the ruins of Glastonbury Abbey. Some scholars understand descriptions of Joseph Smith's process writing the Book of Mormon as a case of automatic writing.

=== Approach ===
Parapsychologist William Fletcher Barrett wrote that "automatic messages may take place either by the writer passively holding a pencil on a sheet of paper, or by the planchette, or by a 'ouija board'." In Spiritualism, spirits are claimed to take control of the hand of a medium to write messages, letters, and even entire books. Automatic writing can happen in a trance or waking state. Some psychical researchers such as Thomson Jay Hudson have claimed that no spirits are involved in automatic writing and the subconscious mind is the explanation.

=== Hoaxes ===
Paranormal investigator Harry Price exposed the supposed automatic writing in the Borley Rectory as the wall-scrawling of a housewife attempting to hide an extramarital affair.

A prominent alleged example of automatic writing is the Brattleboro hoax. When Charles Dickens died in 1870, he left The Mystery of Edwin Drood unfinished. According to the itinerant printer T. P. James, this angered Dickens' spirit so much that he channelled the rest of the novel through James's hand. This is supposed to have begun on Christmas Eve 1872 and continued in tri-weekly sessions until completion.

== Practitioners ==
Automatic writing as a spiritual practice was reported by Hyppolyte Taine in the preface to the third edition of his De l'intelligence, published in 1878. Besides "ethereal visions" or "magnetic auras", Fernando Pessoa claimed to have experienced automatic writing. He said he felt "owned by something else", sometimes feeling a sensation in the right arm he claimed was lifted into the air without his will. Georgie Hyde-Lees, the wife of William Butler Yeats, also claimed she could write automatically. Sri Aurobindo and his follower, The Mother (Mirra Alfassa), regularly practiced Automatic writing.

Catalan medium and artist Josefa Tolrà wrote poems and "transcribed" messages that she included in her drawings, which she ascribed to something or someone "guiding her hand".

Shortly after his 1917 marriage to Georgie Hyde-Lees, the poet W. B. Yeats came to be heavily influenced by her delving into what they referred to as "the automatic script".

In his 1918 book The New Revelation, Arthur Conan Doyle wrote that automatic writing occurs either by the writer's subconscious or by external spirits operating through the writer. Doyle and his wife led an automatic writing séance with Harry Houdini wherein Lady Doyle wrote 15 pages of purported messages from Houdini's mother, although this information was immediately discounted as fraudulent by Houdini.

The essay "The Automatic Message" (1933), first published in the magazine Minotaure, No. 3-4, (Paris), was one of André Breton's significant theoretical works about the method of surrealist automatism. In 1919, he and Philippe Soupault had used what later became the method to compose Les Champs Magnétiques (The Magnetic Fields). In 1997, "The Magnetic Fields" was also the title of a compilation of surrealist writing of André Breton, Paul Éluard, Philippe Soupault, and others. It included the authorized translation of Breton's "The Automatic Message" in English by the poet David Gascoyne, whose Man's Life is This Meat (1936, a collection of his own surrealist writings and translations of the French surrealists) and Hölderlin's Madness (1938) established Gascoyne's reputation as one of a small group of English surrealists. Gascoyne's 1935 A Short Survey of Surrealism for the 1936 London International Surrealist Exhibition also expanded the movement to the English-speaking world. The Surrealist poet Robert Desnos claimed he was among the most gifted in automatic writing. Surrealist automatists, most notably André Masson, adapted these methods to art-making in which the artist suppresses conscious control over the making process, allowing the unconscious mind to have great sway. Prior to the Surrealists, Dadaists, such as Hans Arp, made some use of this method through chance operations.

The medium Pierre L. O. A. Keeler had an alleged spirit writing communication from Abraham Lincoln currently exhibited at the Lily Dale Museum. Despite Lincoln being well-known for his skepticism and Keeler having been known to employ magician's tricks, this is used as one of the many examples of skeptics purportedly endorsing Spiritualism posthumously. Skeptical investigator Joe Nickell who conducted a detailed examination of the "spirit" writing, concluded it had no resemblance to Lincoln's handwriting and described the message as "bogus".

There was an apocalyptic cult led by a lapsed Scientologist named Dorothy Martin. She and her followers were waiting for an alien ship to take them to the nonexistent planet Clarion and save them from a worldwide flood that was to commence at midnight on 20 December 1954. When that did not occur, Martin allegedly got an automatic writing message from God calling the whole thing off.

=== Since 1975 ===
In 1975, Wendy Hart of Maidenhead claimed she wrote automatically about Nicholas Moore, a sea captain who died in 1642. Also in 1975, the CIA attempted to employ remote viewing through the Stargate Project. In the spring of 1989, Angela Dellafiora, a member of Stargate Project's remote viewing unit, claimed to be guided by spirits moving her hand in writing responses about the location of a fugitive DEA agent named Charlie Jordan. In reviewing the matter, Joe Nickell states, "[T]he Charlie Jordan case, touted as one of the most successful examples... in the U.S. government's psychic-spying project is not convincing evidence of anything — save perhaps folly. ...[I]t also illustrates the limitations of anecdotal evidence: conflicting versions, selective reporting, and lack of documentation, together with additional manifestations of faulty memory, bias, and other human foibles."

Conspiracy theorist David Icke said he first became aware of being "Son of the Godhead" via automatic writing. Vassula Ryden claims to receive and transcribe messages from her guardian angel Daniel, Jesus, Yahweh. She has provoked both skepticism and credulity from Catholic laity and clergy, as well as the skeptical community at large. Alleged cases of automatic writing have included Joseph Smith, Patience Worth, Aleister Crowley, Jane Roberts, Helen Schucman and author Neale Donald Walsch. Crowley, for instance, compiled the Collected Works over time, which included The Book of the Law as well as transcripts of his visions of the first two Enochian Aethyrs (planes).

== Scientific analysis and skepticism ==
Scientists and skeptics consider automatic writing to be the result of the ideomotor effect.

According to skeptical investigator Joe Nickell, "automatic writing is produced while one is in a dissociated state. It is a form of motor automatism, or unconscious muscular activity." Neurologist Terence Hines has written "automatic writing is an example of a milder form of dissociative state". In 1900, Swiss psychologist Theodore Flournoy studied the case of the French medium Helene Smith, particularly her handwriting during seances. He concluded that the automatic writing phenomenon was an effect of autosuggestion produced by autohypnotization, leading to the emergence of a secondary self.

Paranormal researcher Ben Radford writes in his 2017 book Investigating Ghosts that there is no real way to know if the writing is coming from "outside their bodies," you "must take their word for it. Because the source of the information is at issue and the medium cannot be validated, we must turn to the content of the material." Various psychic mediums have claimed to channel famous dead people. For example, Susan Lander claimed that Betsy Ross contacted her to say, "I am gay and I fly the flag of pride and liberty for all of us." According to Radford, historians say that there is "no credible historical evidence that Ross ... either made or had a hand in designing the American flag." Without some kind of validation, "anyone can claim to communicate with the spirit of anyone." Radford argues that "Automatic writing should logically hinder, not help spirit communication," given that spelling and grammar are more difficult than direct speech.

=== Scientific studies ===
In an 1890 paper on hypnotism, Morton Prince claims, "automatic writing is not a purely unconscious reflex act, but, the product of conscious individuality," and further claims that the hand that is writing is under the control of a separate hypnotic personality during trances. Physician Charles Arthur Mercier, in the British Medical Journal (1894), criticized the spiritualist interpretation of automatic writing, concluding, "there is no need nor room for the agency of spirits, and the invocation of such agency is the sign of a mind not merely unscientific, but uninformed."

Psychology professor Théodore Flournoy investigated the claim by nineteenth-century medium Hélène Smith (Catherine Müller) that she did automatic writing to convey messages from Mars in Martian language. Flournoy concluded that her "Martian" language had a strong resemblance to Ms. Smith's native language of French and that her automatic writing was "romances of the subliminal imagination, derived largely from forgotten sources (for example, books read as a child)." He invented the term cryptomnesia to describe this phenomenon.

In 1927, psychiatrist Harold Dearden wrote that automatic writing is a psychological method of "tapping" the unconscious mind and that there is nothing mysterious about it.

In 1986, A.B. Joseph investigated two female patients who were found to exhibit ictal hypergraphia.

Automatic writing behavior was discovered by Dilek Evyapan and Emre Kumral in three patients with right hemispheric damage.

A 2012 study of ten psychographers using single photon emission computed tomography showed differences in brain activity and writing complexity during alleged trance states vs. normal state writing.

== Pop culture and media ==
Automatic writing is touted by medium Bonnie Page in a Sentinel and Enterprise article as a method of accessing claircognizance abilities.

Automatic writing is featured prominently in a 1961 episode of Perry Mason, The Case of the Meddling Medium, and is also depicted in the 1980 film The Changeling and the 1999 film The Sixth Sense. In the 2008 film Indiana Jones and the Kingdom of the Crystal Skull automatic writing is referenced as a method of supernatural communication used by the character Harold "Ox" Oxley.

Portions of Van Morrison's album Astral Weeks supposedly are inspired by dreams, reveries, and automatic writing.

Czech director Jan Švankmajer claims he concocted the screenplay for his hybrid film Insect (Hmyz) in a fit of automatic writing.

William S. Burroughs has described his book Naked Lunch as "automatic writing gone horribly wrong" and believed he found his subconscious taken over by a hostile entity.

In an interview in GQ, David Byrne indicated an interest in automatic writing due to the influence of Brian Eno.

== Gallery ==
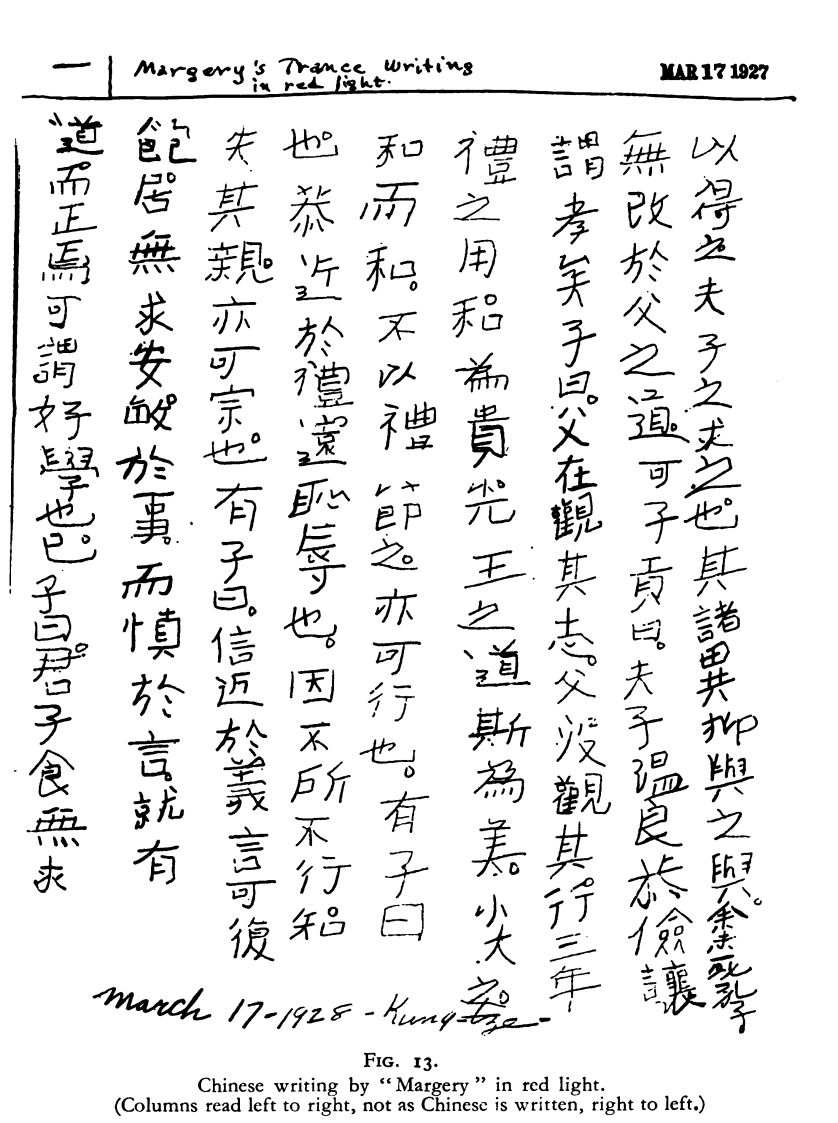
Automatic writing of Mina Crandon

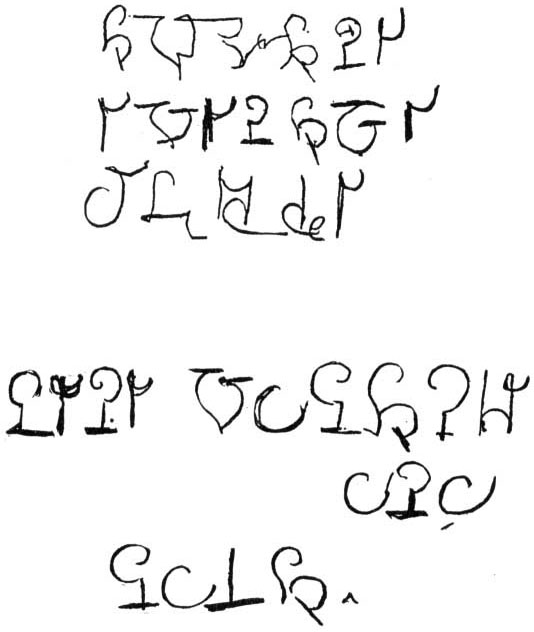
Automatic writing of Hélène Smith

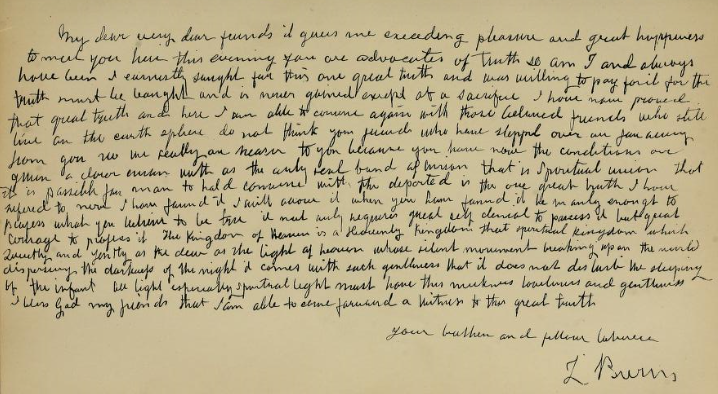
Automatic writing of Mrs Thomas Everitt

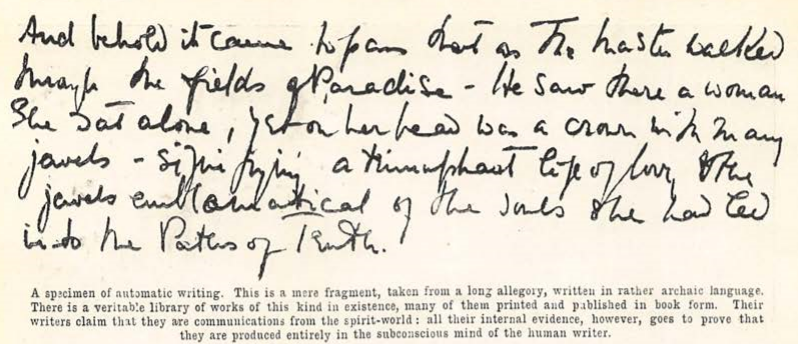
Example of automatic writing cited by magician William Marriott

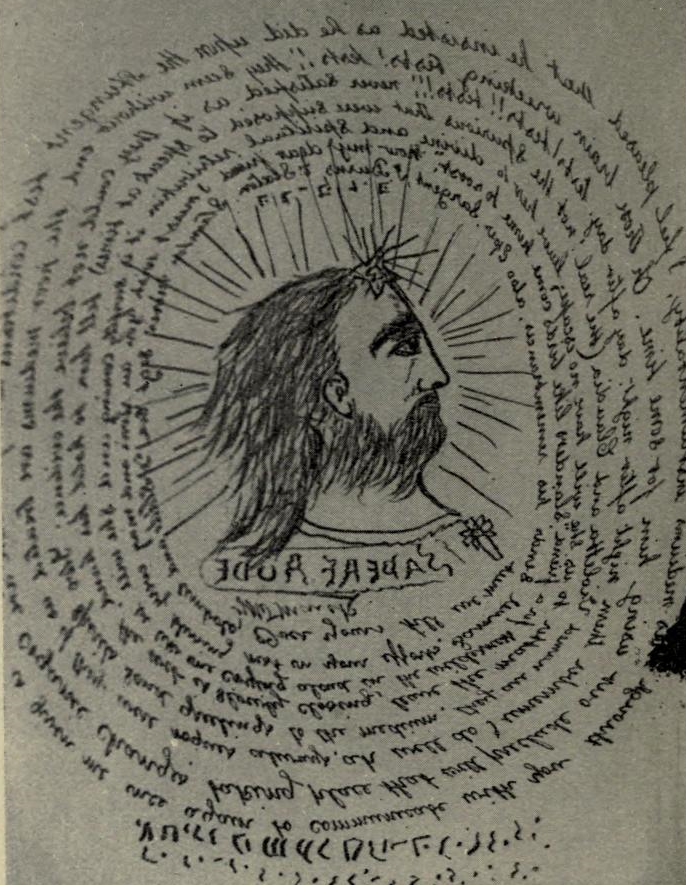
Automatic writing of Francis Ward Monck

== See also ==
- Alien hand syndrome – Neuropsychiatric disorder
- Automatic drawing – Form of art
- Artistic inspiration – Unconscious burst of creativity
- Asemic writing – Wordless open semantic form of writing
- Automatic speech – Utterances with fixed forms and often non-literal meaning
- Joseph Sieber Benner – American New Thought author (1872–1938)
- Bicameral mentality – Hypothesis in psychology
- Divided consciousness – American psychologist (1904–2001)
- Dowsing – Pseudoscientific attempts to locate underground objects
- Dual consciousness – Hypothetical concept in neuroscience
- Exquisite corpse – Surrealist automatic writing & art technique
- Graphology – Pseudoscientific analysis of handwriting
- Left brain interpreter – Neuropsychological concept
- List of topics characterized as pseudoscience
- Matthew Manning – British author and healer
- Memoirs of a Suicide (book)
- Oahspe: A New Bible – 1882 spriritualist book
- Spiritism – System of belief inspired by Allan Kardec
- Spiritism (book) – 1885 book by Eduard von Hartmann
- Spiritualist art – Form of art
- Speaking in tongues – Phenomenon in which people speak words apparently in languages unknown to them
- Stream of consciousness – Narrative device used in literature
- Table-turning – Type of séance
- Chico Xavier – Spiritualist and philanthropist from Brazil (1910–2002)
- Xenoglossy – Paranormal phenomenon involving unnatural foreign language ability
- Telekinesis – Manipulation of objects without physical interaction, with one's mind
