= If You Please =

1920 Surrealist play

If You Please (S'il Vous Plaît) is a Dada–Surrealist play co-written by the French surrealist writer and theorist André Breton and poet and novelist Philippe Soupault.

If You Please was written several years before the publication of the Surrealist Manifesto when Breton was primarily associated with Dada. The original performance was on March 27, 1920 at the Salle Berlioz in Paris and was part of a larger Dada program that "included Tzara's Zurich success La Premiere Adventure céleste de M. Antipyrine [The First Celestial Adventure of Mr. Antipyrine], Le Serin muet [The Silent Serin] by Ribemont-Dessaignes, Le ventriloque désaccordé [The Untuned Ventriloquist] by Paul Dermée, and Picabia's Manifeste cannibale dans l'obscurité [The Cannibal Manifesto in the Dark]."

== Other collaborations ==
Breton and Soupault previously collaborated on Les Champs Magnétiques [The Magnetic Fields], a novel that is one of the first instances of automatic writing.

== Synopsis ==
The play is in four acts; each act begins a new and unrelated story. The first three acts borrow from popular genres, but the dialogue is often associatively poetic.

Act I is a Dada infidelity play that follows two lovers, Paul and Valentine, and Valentine's husband. The Dada dialogue twists the conventions of the dramatic cliché, as in the opening lines which juxtapose the tritest of romantic dialogue with imagistic metaphor. Paul says, "I love you." The two share a "long kiss." Valentine then replies, "A cloud of milk in a cup of tea." This act ends with another cliché of the romantic melodrama, murder at the hands of a jilted lover, but turned on its head. "Paul slowly draws a revolver from his pocket, barely taking aim. Valentine falls without a sound."

Act II similarly reappropriates the detective story. Its protagonist, Létoile, apparently a private detective, sits in his office and encounters stock private investigator storylines, which quickly become absurd and are as quickly abandoned. In Scene 4, when a man tries to hire Létoile's to recover the man's wife's stolen ring, Létoile, instead of pursuing the case, simply explains "Matters such as this concern the police," and the man "rises, bows, and leaves," ending the scene and the storyline. In a subsequent scene a woman enters his office and explains that her husband "feels an honest and upright love for another woman" and that she wants to give him a divorce to "grant him his independence." Létoile presents reasons why she shouldn't get a divorce but forcefully insists on executing the divorce for her.

Act III features an encounter between Mixime, a thirty-year-old man, and Gilda, a prostitute, who meet in a café. They exchange seemingly incoherent dialogue:

MAXIME: The kingdom of the skies is peopled with assassins. Higher up there's a swing which waits for you. Don't lift your head again.
GILDA: The photographer said: Let's not move.
MAXIME: I don't want to die.
GILDA: Someone has dared to sadden you?
MAXIME: I don't think so; I've only just come in.
GILDA: Are your eyes really that color?

The act ends with Maxime asking to go with Gilda to her flat. "Don't insist, sweetheart," she says. "You'll regret it. I've got the syph." Maxime replies simply, "Who cares," and they exit together. This act is followed by "a long intermission."

In the text of the play, Act IV is only a note, stating "The authors of 'If You Please' do not want the fourth act printed." Bettina Knapp writes that the fourth act proceeds as follows: "The theater plunges into semi-darkness. Two characters are now visible in a doorway. X looks at his watch and informs the other man of his imminent departure. Y walks up and down, speechless." Then an actor planted in the orchestra cries out, "Is that all?… Will you soon be finished?" A second planted audience member says, "'I don't understand a thing. It's idiotic.' From the box we hear a voice asking him to be silent or to leave. No, he insists, he paid for his seat and he'll stay. Another voice intervenes from the orchestra, 'If only it were interesting.'" The second planted actor calls for the first to be thrown out. Finally, "the Second Spectator has grown angry and shakes his fist at the stage. Amid the tumult caused by his obstreperous behavior one hears 'Vive la France', then 'Continue'. Finally the call for 'Author' is heard, and instead of Breton and Soupault walking out onstage two other actors take their place."
