= Cryptomnesia =

Memory bias

Cryptomnesia occurs when a forgotten memory returns without it being recognized as such by the subject, who believes it is something new and original. It is a memory bias whereby a person may falsely recall generating a thought, an idea, a tune, a name, or a joke; they are not deliberately engaging in plagiarism, but are experiencing a memory as if it were a new inspiration.

Cryptomnesia was first documented in 1874. The earliest case involved medium Stainton Moses, who thought he was communicating with spirits but unknowingly repeated details he had previously read in a newspaper. The term was coined by psychiatrist Théodore Flournoy while studying medium Hélène Smith, highlighting how forgotten memories can resurface distorted by imagination. Psychologists like Carl Jung, Sigmund Freud, and Jacques Lacan further explored the concept, linking it to subconscious memory retrieval, creativity, and self-misrecognition. Jung analyzed Friedrich Nietzsche's writings, suggesting his use of previously encountered material was likely unintentional.

Experimental research has demonstrated cryptomnesia's prevalence. In one of the first studies, participants took turns generating examples within categories and were later asked to produce new, unique ones. Between 3% and 9% inadvertently repeated others' ideas or misattributed them to themselves, a finding replicated in word puzzles, brainstorming sessions, and similar tasks. Cryptomnesia is more likely when cognitive load impairs source monitoring: people are less able to recall where an idea originated and may unconsciously claim it as their own. Jung noted that this process often drives creativity: authors may write something they believe to be original, only to later discover its similarity to previously encountered works.

Numerous famous cases illustrate cryptomnesia's impact. Nietzsche unknowingly reproduced passages from a book he had read in his youth, while Lord Byron's Manfred showed striking parallels to Goethe's Faust, which Byron claimed never to have read. Helen Keller inadvertently borrowed from a story read to her years earlier, leading to accusations of plagiarism that deeply affected her. Musicians like George Harrison faced legal consequences for subconscious copying, as seen in the "My Sweet Lord" copyright case, while Aerosmith's Steven Tyler once failed to recognize his own band's song on the radio. Authors such as Robert Louis Stevenson, Colleen McCullough, and Umberto Eco have all reported similar experiences.

== Early use ==
Cryptomnesia was first documented in 1874, involving the medium Stainton Moses, who during a séance believed himself to be in spiritual contact with two brothers from India who had recently been killed. Despite the apparent communication, he was unable to ascertain any details which had not already been given in newspaper coverage of the story the week before. Researchers concluded that Moses had read the story but forgotten that he had read it, instead mistaking the partial memory for a message from the spirit world.

The word was first used by the psychiatrist Théodore Flournoy, in reference to the case of medium Hélène Smith (Catherine-Élise Müller) to suggest the high incidence in psychism of "latent memories on the part of the medium that come out, sometimes greatly disfigured by a subliminal work of imagination or reasoning, as so often happens in our ordinary dreams."

Carl Gustav Jung treated the subject in his thesis "On the Psychology and Pathology of So-Called Occult Phenomena" (1902), and in an article, "Cryptomnesia" (1905), suggested the phenomenon in Friedrich Nietzsche's Thus Spoke Zarathustra. The idea was studied or mentioned by Géza Dukes, Sándor Ferenczi and Wilhelm Stekel as well as by Sigmund Freud in speaking of the originality of his inventions. Jacques Lacan illustrated the adaptability of the concept in his formulation of the ego ideal (the "ego" as Other) in refashioning the "case" of Marguerite Pantaine (Case of Aimée). Her experiences of self-"misrecognition" provided a structure for Lacan's key subsequent theories of The Symbolic and the mirror stage.

== Experimental research ==
In the first empirical study of cryptomnesia, people in a group took turns generating category examples (e.g., kinds of birds: parrot, canary, etc.). They were later asked to create new exemplars in the same categories that were not previously produced, and also to recall which words they had personally generated. People inadvertently plagiarized about 3–9% of the time either by regenerating another person's thought or falsely recalling someone's thought as their own. Similar effects have been replicated using other tasks such as word search puzzles and in brainstorming sessions.

== Causes ==
Cryptomnesia is more likely to occur when the ability to properly monitor sources is impaired. For example, people are more likely to falsely claim ideas as their own when they were under high cognitive load at the time they first considered the idea.

== Value ==
As explained by Carl Jung, in Man and His Symbols, "An author may be writing steadily to a preconceived plan, working out an argument or developing the line of a story, when he suddenly runs off at a tangent. Perhaps a fresh idea has occurred to him, or a different image, or a whole new sub-plot. If you ask him what prompted the digression, he will not be able to tell you. He may not even have noticed the change, though he has now produced material that is entirely fresh and apparently unknown to him before. Yet it can sometimes be shown convincingly that what he has written bears a striking similarity to the work of another author – a work that he believes he has never seen."

== Cases ==
=== Nietzsche ===
Jung gives the following example in Man and His Symbols. Friedrich Nietzsche's book Thus Spoke Zarathustra includes an almost word for word account of an incident also included in a book published about 1835, half a century before Nietzsche wrote. This is considered to be neither purposeful plagiarism nor pure coincidence: Nietzsche's sister confirmed that he had indeed read the original account when he was younger, likely sometime between ages 12 and 15; Nietzsche's youthful intellectual capabilities, his later cognitive degeneration, and his accompanying psychological deterioration (specifically, his increasing grandiosity as manifested in his later behavior and writings) together strengthen the likelihood that he happened to commit the passage to memory upon initially reading it and later, after having lost his memory of encountering it, assumed that his own mind had created it.

=== Byron ===
In some cases, the line between cryptomnesia and zeitgeist (compare the concept of multiple discovery in science) may be somewhat hazy. Readers of Lord Byron's closet drama Manfred noted a strong resemblance to Goethe's Faust. In a review published in 1820, Goethe wrote, "Byron's tragedy Manfred was to me a wonderful phenomenon, and one that closely touched me. This singular intellectual poet has taken my Faustus to himself, and extracted from it the strangest nourishment for his hypochondriac humour. He has made use of the impelling principles in his own way, for his own purposes, so that no one of them remains the same; and it is particularly on this account that I cannot enough admire his genius." Byron was apparently thankful for the compliment; however, he claimed that he had never read Faustus.

=== Helen Keller ===
Helen Keller compromised her own and her teacher's credibility with an incident of cryptomnesia which was misinterpreted as plagiarism. The Frost King, which Keller wrote out of buried memories of the fairy tale The Frost Fairies by Margaret Canby, read to her four years previously, was heavily criticized, leaving Keller a nervous wreck, and unable to write fiction for the rest of her life.

=== Robert Louis Stevenson ===
Robert Louis Stevenson refers to an incident of cryptomnesia that took place during the writing of Treasure Island, and that he discovered to his embarrassment several years afterward:

... I am now upon a painful chapter. No doubt the parrot once belonged to Robinson Crusoe. No doubt the skeleton is conveyed from Poe. I think little of these, they are trifles and details; and no man can hope to have a monopoly of skeletons or make a corner in talking birds. The stockade, I am told, is from Masterman Ready. It may be, I care not a jot. These useful writers had fulfilled the poet's saying: departing, they had left behind them Footprints on the sands of time, Footprints which perhaps another—and I was the other! It is my debt to Washington Irving that exercises my conscience, and justly so, for I believe plagiarism was rarely carried farther. I chanced to pick up the Tales of a Traveller some years ago with a view to an anthology of prose narrative, and the book flew up and struck me: Billy Bones, his chest, the company in the parlour, the whole inner spirit, and a good deal of the material detail of my first chapters—all were there, all were the property of Washington Irving. But I had no guess of it then as I sat writing by the fireside, in what seemed the spring-tides of a somewhat pedestrian inspiration; nor yet day by day, after lunch, as I read aloud my morning's work to the family. It seemed to me original as sin; it seemed to belong to me like my right eye ...

=== Jerusalem of Gold ===
Jerusalem of Gold (ירושלים של זהב) is a 1967 song by Naomi Shemer. Some of the song's melody is based on a Basque lullaby, Pello Joxepe, composed by Juan Francisco Petriarena 'Xenpelar' (1835–1869). Shemer heard a rendition by Spanish singer/songwriter Paco Ibáñez, who visited Israel in 1962 and performed the song to a group that included her and Nehama Hendel. She later acknowledged hearing Hendel perform Pello Joxepe in the mid-1960s, and that she had unconsciously based some of the melody on the lullaby. Shemer felt very bad when she found that it was similar to Pello Joxepe, but when Ibáñez was asked how he felt about the issue, he replied he was "glad it helped in some way", and that he was not angry, nor did he perceive it as plagiarism.

=== Steven Tyler ===
In 1984, when Aerosmith were recording Done With Mirrors, lead singer Steven Tyler heard the group's "You See Me Crying" on the radio and, not remembering that it was their own song, suggested that the group record a cover version, to which guitarist Joe Perry replied, "That's us, fuckhead!"

=== George Harrison ===
The precedent in United States copyright law, since 1976, has been to treat alleged cryptomnesia no differently from deliberate plagiarism. The seminal case is Bright Tunes Music v. Harrisongs Music, where the publisher of "He's So Fine", written and composed by Ronald Mack, demonstrated to the court that George Harrison borrowed substantial portions of his song "My Sweet Lord" from "He's So Fine". The Court imposed damages despite a claim that the copying was subconscious. The ruling was upheld by the Second Circuit in ABKCO Music v. Harrisongs Music, and the case Three Boys Music v. Michael Bolton, upheld by the Ninth Circuit, affirmed the principle.

=== Colleen McCullough ===
In 1987, Australian author Colleen McCullough published a novella, The Ladies of Missalonghi. Critics alleged that she had plagiarised The Blue Castle, a 1926 novel by L. M. Montgomery. McCullough acknowledged having read Montgomery's works in her youth, but attributed the similarities to subconscious recollection.

=== Umberto Eco ===
In Interpretation and Overinterpretation, Umberto Eco describes the rediscovery of an antique book among his large collection, which was eerily similar to the pivotal object in his novel The Name of the Rose.

I had bought that book in my youth, skimmed through it, realized that it was exceptionally soiled, and put it somewhere and forgot it. But by a sort of internal camera I had photographed those pages, and for decades the image of those poisonous leaves lay in the most remote part of my soul, as in a grave, until the moment it emerged again (I do not know for what reason) and I believed I had invented it.

== See also ==
- Age regression in hypnotherapy – Controversial therapy technique
- Anybody Seen My Baby? – 1997 single by the Rolling Stones
- Automatic writing – Claimed psychic ability
- Bridey Murphy – Purported example of a recalled past life
- Confabulation – Recall of fabricated, misinterpreted or distorted memories
- Déjà vu – Psychological sensation
- False memory – Psychological occurrence
- Hindsight bias – Type of confirmation bias
- Jamais vu – Phenomenon in psychology
- Joke theft – Repetition of other people's original jokes without credit
- Melancholy Elephants – 1982 short story by Spider Robinson
- Minority influence – Form of social influence
- Misattribution of memory – Misidentification during memory recall
- Misinformation effect – Effect of later events on a previous memory
- Past life regression – Pseudoscientific claim that past lives can be remembered
- Revelation – Communication from a deity
- Sleeper effect – Psychological phenomenon
- Source amnesia – Remembering information but not its source
