= Noseblindness =

Noseblindness can mean:

- Anosmia, the inability to smell
- Olfactory fatigue, the habituation of the sense of smell to a particular odor or odors
