= Automatism (medicine) =

Set of brief unconscious behaviors

- Specialty: Neurology

Automatism is a set of brief unconscious or automatic behaviors, typically at least several seconds or minutes, while the subject is unaware of actions. This type of automatic behavior often occurs in certain types of epilepsy, such as complex partial seizures in those with temporal lobe epilepsy, or as a side effect of particular medications such as zolpidem.

Automatic behaviors involve the spontaneous production of purposeless verbal or motor behavior without conscious self-control or self-censorship. This condition can be observed in a variety of contexts, including schizophrenia, dissociative fugue, Tourette syndrome, epilepsy (in complex partial seizures and Jacksonian seizures), narcolepsy, or in response to a traumatic event.

Automatic behavior can also be exhibited in REM sleep, during which a higher amount of brain stimulus increases dreaming patterns. In such circumstances, subjects can hold conversations, sit up, and even open their eyes. These acts are considered subconscious as most of the time the events cannot be recalled by the subject.

Automatic behavior may also manifest while performing well-learned actions. In this case, the behavior becomes automatic because it does not require conscious monitoring. The seemingly purposeful task is performed with no clear memory of it happening.

== Variations ==
Varying degrees of automatism may include simple gestures, such as finger rubbing, lip smacking, chewing, or swallowing, or more complex actions, such as sleepwalking behaviors. Others may include speech, which may or may not be coherent or sensible. The subject may or may not remain conscious otherwise throughout the episode. Conscious subjects may be fully aware of their other actions at the time, but unaware of their automatism.

In some more complex automatisms, the subject enters into the behaviors of sleepwalking while fully awake until it starts. In these episodes, which can last for longer periods of time, the subject proceeds to engage in routine activities such as cooking, showering, driving a familiar route, or even conversation. Following the episode, the subject regains consciousness, often feeling disoriented, and has no memory of the incident.

== Early automatism ==
The interest in automatic behavior started in the 19th century after a vast spiritual movement was associated with uncontrollable body movements. Many people believed that uncontrollable movements such as table-turning, tilting, and screaming were signs of spirit possessions or that outside forces were taking over human bodies.

Many individuals started focusing on automatic behavior, such as the psychotherapist and psychologists Pierre Janet. Pierre Janet played an important role in studying the condition of dissociation related to automatic behaviors. Janet collected abnormal cases of automatisms and studied these cases with the idea that the patient's consciousness and unconsciousness were separated, causing behavioral changes and automatism. This approach to automatisms and the study of the conscious and unconscious part of the brain was inspired by the work of Sigmund Freud and William James; two investigators of hypnosis and hysteria.

At that time, automatism was a condition that many people faked. Indeed, scam artists use confidence tricks to depict fake spiritual possessions by making it seem like they weren't in control of their bodies. Interest in the spiritual movement eventually dropped in the early 20th century. However, scientists were always skeptical of the idea of automatism. There wasn't a concrete way to know if the sensation of losing control of the body felt by the individuals was real.

== Conditions of automatism ==
There are many conditions for automatism. One example is dissociation, where consciousness and unconsciousness can be separated and change behavioral patterns. Dissociative symptoms, prevalent in many cases can be seen in people who have experienced blindness, deafness, anesthesia of various parts of the body, convulsions, possession, odd voices or sudden new habits, physical illness, and others. Dissociation can be connected to hypnosis, where involuntary actions are produced as a result. Hypnosis was closely related to dissociation because people were vulnerable to hypnosis while experiencing dissociative symptoms. Dissociation leads people to lose control over their actions as their consciousness and unconsciousness separate.

Another condition of automatism is the expectation of attention, where someone has expectations that an action will be produced. For example, the use of a pendulum, during which the person holding the pendulum is attempting not to move it, the thought of it moving still crosses the mind. Expectation attention can therefore be described as expecting an action to occur, where our thought process is based on a movement we believe is bound to happen, creating this expectation. As our thoughts and actions are connected, focusing on the expectation of such action is likely bound to happen. We can also see the "trolling for consistent action" affecting expectation attention. For example, when thinking of a specific feeling, such as coughing, as the thought lingers for a while we suddenly feel the urge to cough, clearing our throat and then eliminating such sensation. As this process plays out, we do not feel that we coughed due to the thought of doing so, as we aren't as aware of the thought in the first place. Expectation attention allows us to focus on our thought about action, even though our consciousness does not perceive us focusing on it, and so thought and behavior are separated.

Movement confusion is another condition of automatism, and is defined as one's belief that an action must be seen to believe that they are producing that action. For example, with the use of a pendulum, pushing a pendulum in a certain direction or pulling it in the opposite direction can contradict the original thought of the specific movement of the pendulum. As we can see the result of such action that we produce, it is harder to continue producing such action if it is opposite from our original idea of how the action will be produced. As it becomes harder to see the initial perceived action, the consistency of such action is being seen less, and the consciousness will soon become the unconsciousness of performing this action.

An outside agent can also be a condition of automatism. People subject to automatism will produce involuntary actions that were not controlled by their mental causation. To explain that phenomenon many will believe an outside factor is responsible for the action. Since the individuals don't have a conscious feeling of doing the automatic behavior, they automatically doubt that their mind could be responsible for it, pushing them to believe someone else, or something else, is causing their behavior. Many people link automatism with spirit possession for that reason.

== Automatic behavior in seizures ==
According to the book Brainstorm: Detective Stories From the World of Neurology by Suzanne O'Sullivan, a side effect of focal seizures are uncontrollable movements, also known as automatism. O'Sullivan observed many automatisms in her patients such as purposeless swearing, spitting, uncontrollable clicking fingers, fumbling movements, and more. According to O'Sullivan, these symptoms are "an automatic release phenomenon that occurs because brain inhibition has been lost." The release of inhibition causes automatic behavior in other cases such as after a cingulotomy or even in the postictal phase of a seizure. In those cases, the patients having an epileptic seizure aren't in control of their bodies.

Usually, focal seizures from the temporal lobe or extratemporal seizure with cingulate cortex will generate automatic movements. The automatic behavior happens around five seconds after the seizure starts. It results from the spread of the seizure past its starting point. During a seizure, the cortical region of the brain can be activated, generating an automatic behavior.

Different automatic behavior can occur depending on what part of the brain is affected during the seizures. For instance, the electric stimulation of the cingulate, part of the cortex involved in behavior regulation, can create an automatic movement to the contralateral leg, lip, and face. If the patient has an effective automatism such as facial expressions that exhibit fear, the limbic motor region of the cingulate cortex is most likely impacted by the seizure. If the patient has an automatic behavior involving oral-alimentary like chewing or the movement of the appendicular skeleton such as picking up an object, this means the seizure activated the temporal lobe of the patient. Seizures can also impact the anterior cingulate causing the patient to have an uncontrollable ictal pouting also known as an inverted smile.

== Spirit possession automatism ==
The Ouija Board, is a flat board marked with the letters of the alphabet, the words "yes and no", numbers 0–9 as well as other graphics. The board uses a small heart-shaped piece of plastic or wood which is called a planchette. To use this board correctly, participants must place their fingers on the planchette and see which direction it points. The action of the board can be explained by a psychophysiological phenomenon known as the ideomotor effect. The ideomotor effect, also known as the "Automatism Theory", is the idea that even though a person may not know they are controlling the message indicator, they are. Most proponents of the Automatism Theory undertake the fact that it is probable to move the planchette unconsciously and declare that the Ouija board opens up a shortcut from the conscious to the subconscious mind.

The pendulum is a hand-held device usually containing a crystal and a chain. Crystals are often used as the weight stone, as the user could connect with them spiritually and cleanse them as needed. When using a pendulum, individuals begin to think about what questions they want to ask the pendulum, usually being yes or no questions. Usually, the pendulum will start moving in a specific pattern. The pendulum is linked to automatism as it is often believed to be caused by automatic behavior. Indeed, slight movement can make the pendulum move. In addition, thinking about the pendulum moving can subconsciously push someone to move the pendulum and blame it on spirits. This is another case of the ideomotor effect as the individual is not aware of moving the pendulum.

Dowsing is a technique used to locate ground water, minerals, ores, gemstones, and many more by using a divining/dowsing rod. A divining rod usually consists of either tree branches or a forked rod, normally being hazelwood and V/Y/L shaped. With these rods, it is believed that when standing over a water source or minerals, the rods will spontaneously cross, or stick downwards. The scientific community criticizes this belief as they think dowsing is caused by an automatic behavior from the person dowsing. Indeed, subconsciously, the rods getting pushed together might be caused by the individual. This could be explained by the Ideomotor Effect as the individual is not aware they are causing the rods to move.

== Tourette syndrome ==
Tourette syndrome is a neurodevelopmental disorder with primary indicators being vocal and motor tics. To be classified as Tourette's syndrome, the individual must have a minimum of one vocal tic and two motor tics that have been chronically present. A tic is defined as a sudden, recurring, automatic, movement or vocalization. The cause has been widely disputed since its discovery in 1885 by George Giles de la Tourette. Causal theories have ranged widely from repressed sexual conflict to oppressive parents. Modern day research leans more towards both environmental and genetic factors and triggers.

== Alien hand syndrome ==
Alien hand syndrome is an automatic behavior, first discovered in 1908, in which the person has uncontrolled behavior and observes his limbs moving without consciously having the capacity to control it. Often, it happens to be the left hand, since the right hemisphere is affected. There are a few different versions of alien hand syndrome that can occur, which are the Frontal Lobe version, the Callosal version, and the Posterior version. The frontal lobe version is the only version that affects the right hand of the individual. The callosal version involves the corpus callosum area of the brain. The posterior version involves the parietal lobe. The frontal, occipital, and parietal areas of the brain are also associated to this syndrome. It can occur after brain surgery, stroke, infection, tumor, aneurysm, migraine, having the two hemispheres surgically separated, Alzheimer's disease, Corticobasal degeneration, and Creutzfeldt--Jakob disease. Although anyone can fall victim to this, alien hand syndrome is a very rare side effect.

== Dreams ==
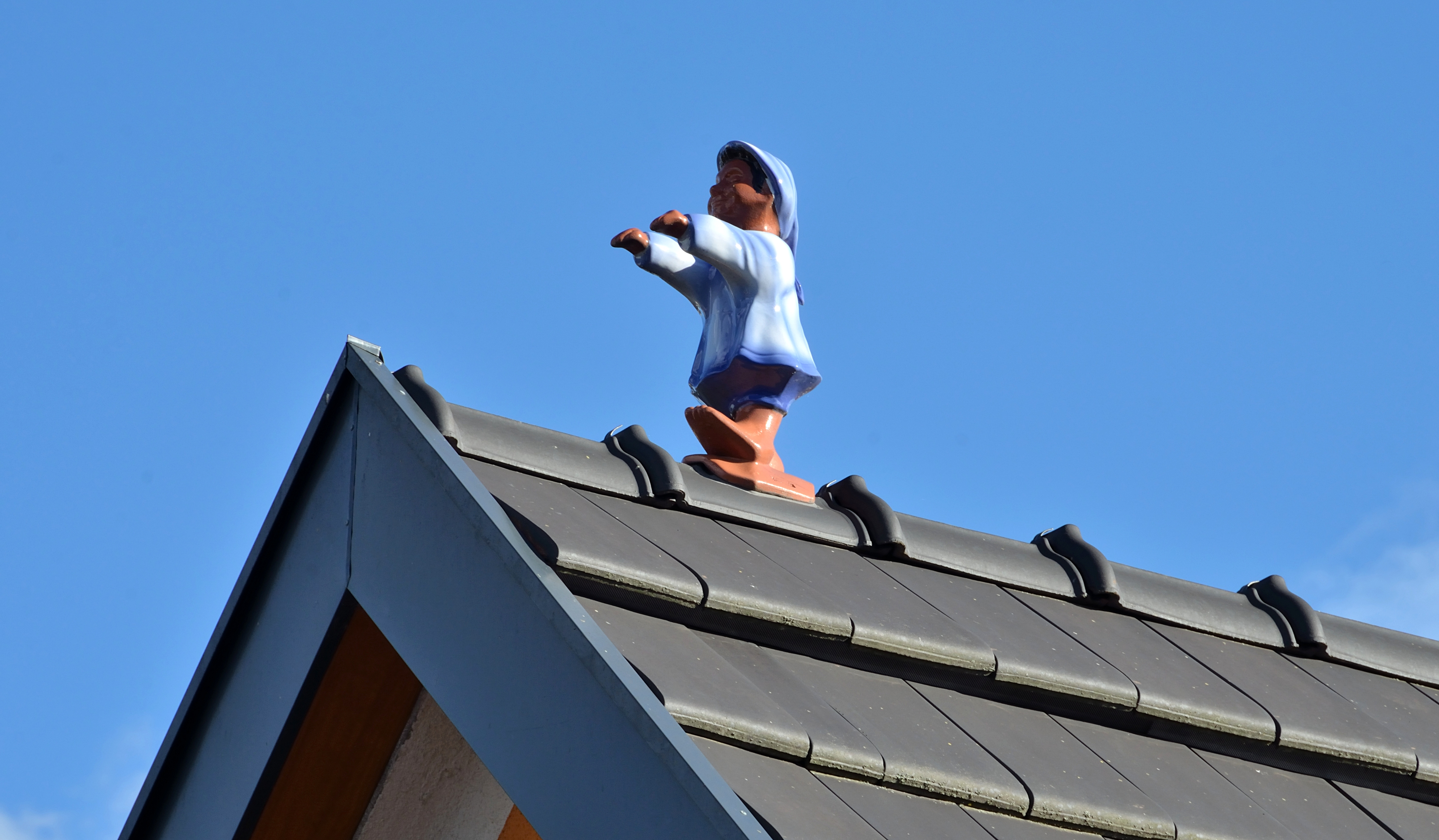
Statue of a sleepwalker on top of a house in Austria

While the human body is sleeping, we are considered to be unconscious. Automatism can be illustrated within dreams, as the human brain does not need to think about dreaming. The brain is active during the REM (rapid eye movement) stage of sleep, when dreams occur, however this is only to portray the images we see in our dreams. Further analysis of this ideology can be seen in nightmares. This is an example of why dreaming is considered an automatic behavior. Sleepwalking also occurs as a thought of automatic behavior found within the subcategory of dreams. Sleepwalking occurs in the frontal cortex responsible for rationality and the hippocampus used for memory. Scientists know this information from performing various tests on sleepwalking patients, such as EEG's and brain scans. It has been shown that sleepwalking relates to the natural human behavior of sleeping, although the frontal cortex is awake and ready to go. This can be seen in many animal species, as this form of sleep where the frontal cortex is partially awake stems from an adaptation of enhanced survival. This is because the animals are ready to rise and defend against predators, and are less vulnerable while sleeping. While sleepwalking can be dangerous, it is something nobody can control, therefore considered a subclass of automatic behavior in dreams.

== Everyday automatism ==
Everyday automatism is how someone can be affected in their everyday life due to the automatism they are experiencing. Even the most basic things done daily becomes extremely difficult—for example, showering, eating, and even breathing. Showering becomes difficult with the effects of nausea, paleness, and oral automatisms which can be triggered by the shower, through this automatism it is affected in the left temporal lobe. When the shower triggers this automatism, it triggers the left temporal lobe and causes these effects to happen to the individual experiencing these automatisms.

Eating is another aspect of one's life that happens daily. Automatisms that are attached to eating can be triggered or caused by eating which can cause dizziness, impaired speech, jerking, and lip-smacking, without loss of awareness. All of those effects are provoked by eating or the mere thought of eating. Something so simple as breathing is affected due to automatisms, and the effects it can cause are shortness of breath, changes in respiratory rate and pattern, and reflexes such as coughing are triggered through automatisms. These are all examples of things someone does daily and possible side effects they can experience due to their epilepsy.

== See also ==
- Automatism (law)
- Automatic writing
- Facilitated communication
- Homicidal somnambulism
- Tic

== Sources ==
- Wegner, Daniel M. (2017). The Illusion of Conscious Will. MIT Press. ISBN 978-0-262-53492-5.
