= The Automatic Message =

1933 book by André Breton

- Author: André Breton
- Original title: Le Message Automatique
- Language: French
- Subject: Automatism
- Genre: Essay
- Publisher: Minotaure
- Publication date: 1933

The Automatic Message (1933) (French: Le Message Automatique) was one of André Breton's significant theoretical works about automatism. The essay was first published in the magazine Minotaure, No. 3-4, (Paris) 1933.

In 1997 it became the title of a compilation of surrealist writing of André Breton, Paul Éluard and Philippe Soupault, amongst others. The book includes two vital "automatic" texts of surrealism.

Breton's prefatory essay The Automatic Message relates the technique to the underlying concepts and aesthetic of surrealism.

The Magnetic Fields (Les Champs Magnétiques) (1919) by Breton and Soupault, was the first work of literary surrealism and one of the foundations of modern European thought and writing. The Automatic Message contains the authorised translation by the poet David Gascoyne, who was himself a member of the group and a friend of both authors.

The Immaculate Conception (1930) traces the interior and exterior life of man from Conception and Intra-Uterine Life to Death and The Original Judgement, and includes a section with a series of "simulations" of various types of mental instability.

== Literature ==
André Breton, The Automatic Message. In: The Message. Art and Occultism. Ed. by Claudia Dichter, Hans Günter Golinski, Michael Krajewski, Zander. Walther König: Cologne 2007, p. 33-55, ISBN 978-3-86560-342-5. (singular illustrated translation of Breton's Essay)

Breton, André; Eluard, Paul; Soupault, Philippe (2001). The Automatic Message, the Magnetic Fields, the Immaculate Conception. UK: Atlas Press. ISBN 0-947757-99-6.
