= Déjà vu =

Psychological sensation

Déjà vu (/deɪʒɑː v(j)uː/ DAY-jah-VOO, -VEW, French: [deʒa vy]; "already seen") is the phenomenon of feeling like one has lived through the present situation in the past. It is an illusion of memory whereby—despite a strong sense of recollection—the time, place, and context of the "previous" experience are uncertain or impossible. Approximately two-thirds of surveyed populations report experiencing déjà vu at least one time in their lives. The phenomenon manifests occasionally as a symptom of seizure auras, and some researchers have associated chronic or frequent "pathological" déjà vu with neurological or psychiatric illness. Experiencing déjà vu has been correlated with higher socioeconomic status, better educational attainment, and lower ages. People who travel often, frequently watch films, or frequently remember their dreams are also more likely to report experiencing déjà vu than others.

== History ==
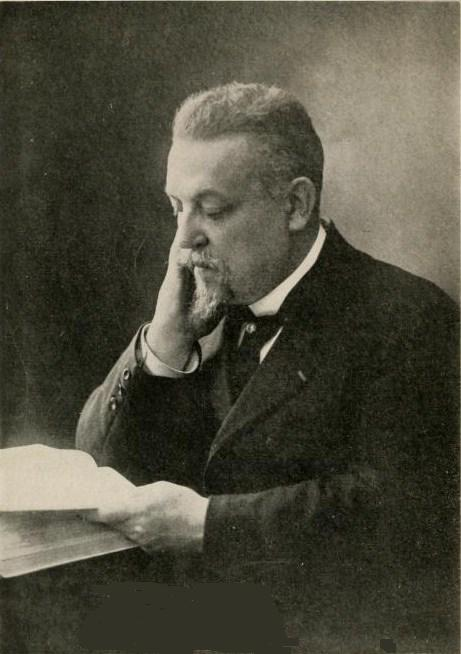
Émile Boirac in 1917

The term was first used in 1876 by Émile Boirac, a French philosopher whose book L'avenir des sciences psychiques (lit. 'The Future of the Psychic Sciences') included the sensation of déjà vu. Déjà vu has been presented by Émile as a reminiscence of memories, "These experiments have led scientists to suspect that déjà vu is a memory phenomenon. We encounter a situation that is similar to an actual memory but we can’t fully recall that memory." This evidence, found by Émile Boirac, helps the public understand what déjà vu can entail on the average brain. It was also stated by Boirac, "Our brain recognizes the similarities between our current experience and one in the past ... left with a feeling of familiarity that we can't quite place."

== Medical disorders ==
Déjà vu is associated with temporal lobe epilepsy. This experience is a neurological anomaly related to epileptic electrical discharge in the brain, creating a strong sensation that an event or experience currently being experienced has already been experienced in the past.

Migraines with aura are also associated with déjà vu. Early researchers tried to establish a link between déjà vu and mental disorders such as anxiety, dissociative identity disorder and schizophrenia but failed to find correlations of any diagnostic value. No special association has been found between déjà vu and schizophrenia. A 2008 study found that déjà vu experiences are unlikely to be pathological dissociative experiences.

Some research has looked into genetics when considering déjà vu. Although there is not currently a gene associated with déjà vu, the LGI1 gene on chromosome 10 is being studied for a possible link. Certain forms of the gene are associated with a mild form of epilepsy, and, though by no means a certainty, déjà vu, along with jamais vu, occurs often enough during seizures (such as focal seizures) that researchers have reason to suspect a link.

== Pharmacology ==
Certain combinations of medical drugs have been reported to increase the chances of déjà vu occurring in the user. Taiminen and Jääskeläinen (2001) explored the case of an otherwise healthy person who started experiencing intense and recurrent sensations of déjà vu upon taking the drugs amantadine and phenylpropanolamine together to relieve flu symptoms. Because of the dopaminergic action of the drugs and previous findings from electrode stimulation of the brain (e.g. Bancaud, Brunet-Bourgin, Chauvel, & Halgren, 1994), Taiminen and Jääskeläinen speculated that déjà vu occurs as a result of hyperdopaminergic action in the medial temporal areas of the brain. A similar case study by Karla, Chancellor, and Zeman (2007) suggests a link between déjà vu and the serotonergic system, after an otherwise healthy woman began experiencing similar symptoms while taking a combination of 5-hydroxytryptophan and carbidopa.

== Explanations ==
=== Split perception explanation ===
Déjà vu may happen if a person experienced the current sensory experience twice successively. The first input experience is brief, degraded, occluded, or distracted. Immediately following that, the second perception might be familiar because the person naturally related it to the first input. One possibility behind this mechanism is that the first input experience involves shallow processing, which means that only some superficial physical attributes are extracted from the stimulus.

=== Memory-based explanation ===
==== Implicit memory ====
Research has associated déjà vu experiences with good memory functions, particularly long-term implicit memory. Recognition memory enables people to realize the event or activity that they are experiencing has happened before. When people experience déjà vu, they may have their recognition memory triggered by certain situations which they have never encountered.

The similarity between a déjà vu–eliciting stimulus and a non-existing, or existing but different, memory trace may lead to the sensation that an event or experience currently being experienced has already been experienced in the past. Thus, encountering something that evokes the implicit associations of an experience or sensation that cannot be remembered may lead to déjà vu. In an effort to reproduce the sensation experimentally, Banister and Zangwill (1941) used hypnosis to give participants posthypnotic amnesia for material they had already seen. When this was later re-encountered, the restricted activation caused thereafter by the posthypnotic amnesia resulted in three of the ten participants reporting what the authors termed "paramnesias".

Two approaches are used by researchers to study feelings of previous experience, with the process of recollection and familiarity. Recollection-based recognition is the ostensible realization that the current situation has occurred before. Familiarity-based recognition is the feeling of familiarity with the current situation without being able to identify any specific memory or previous event that could be associated with the sensation.

In 2010, O'Connor, Moulin, and Conway developed another laboratory analog of déjà vu based on two contrast groups of carefully selected participants, a group under posthypnotic amnesia condition (PHA) and a group under posthypnotic familiarity condition (PHF). The idea of PHA group was based on the work done by Banister and Zangwill (1941), and the PHF group was built on the research results of O'Connor, Moulin, and Conway (2007). They applied the same puzzle game for both groups, "Railroad Rush Hour", a game in which one aims to slide a red car through the exit by rearranging and shifting other blocking trucks and cars on the road. After completing the puzzle, each participant in the PHA group received a posthypnotic amnesia suggestion to forget the game in the hypnosis. Then, each participant in the PHF group was not given the puzzle but received a posthypnotic familiarity suggestion that they would feel familiar with this game during the hypnosis. After the hypnosis, all participants were asked to play the puzzle (the second time for PHA group) and reported the feelings of playing. The idea of PHA group was based on the work done by Banister and Zangwill (1941), and the PHF group was built on the research results of O'Connor, Moulin, and Conway (2007).

In the PHA condition, if a participant reported no memory of completing the puzzle game during hypnosis, researchers scored the participant as passing the suggestion. In the PHF condition, if participants reported that the puzzle game felt familiar, researchers scored the participant as passing the suggestion. It turned out that, both in the PHA and PHF conditions, five participants passed the suggestion and one did not, which is 83.33% of the total sample. More participants in PHF group felt a strong sense of familiarity, for instance, comments like "I think I have done this several years ago." Furthermore, more participants in PHF group experienced a strong déjà vu, for example, "I think I have done the exact puzzle before." Three out of six participants in the PHA group felt a sense of déjà vu, and none of them experienced a strong sense of it. These figures are consistent with Banister and Zangwill's findings. Some participants in PHA group related the familiarity when completing the puzzle with an exact event that happened before, which is more likely to be a phenomenon of source amnesia. Other participants started to realize that they may have completed the puzzle game during hypnosis, which is more akin to the phenomenon of breaching. In contrast, participants in the PHF group reported that they felt confused about the strong familiarity of this puzzle, with the feeling of playing it just sliding across their minds. Overall, the experiences of participants in the PHF group is more likely to be the déjà vu in life, while the experiences of participants in the PHA group is unlikely to be real déjà vu.

A 2012 study in the journal Consciousness and Cognition, that used virtual reality technology to study reported déjà vu experiences, supported this idea. This virtual reality investigation suggested that similarity between a new scene's spatial layout and the layout of a previously experienced scene in memory (but which fails to be recalled) may contribute to the déjà vu experience. When the previously experienced scene fails to come to mind in response to viewing the new scene, that previously experienced scene in memory can still exert an effect—that effect may be a feeling of familiarity with the new scene that is subjectively experienced as a feeling that an event or experience currently being experienced has already been experienced in the past, or of having been there before despite knowing otherwise.

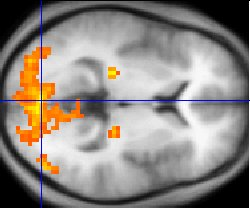
An example of an fMRI brain scan

In 2018 a study examined volunteers' brains under experimentally induced déjà vu through the use of fMRI brain scans. The induced "deja vu" state was created by getting them to look at a series of logically related and unrelated words. The researchers would then ask the participants how many words starting with a specific letter they saw. With related words such as "door, shutter, screen, breeze", the participants would be asked if they saw any words that started with "W" (i.e. Window, a term that was not presented to the participants). If they did note that they thought they saw a word that wasn't presented to them, then déjà vu was induced. The researchers would then examine the volunteers' brains at the moment of induced déjà vu. From these scans, they noticed that there was visible activity in regions of the brain associated with mnemonic conflict. This finding suggests that more research regarding memory conflict may be important in better understanding déjà vu.

==== Cryptomnesia ====
Another possible explanation for the phenomenon of déjà vu is the occurrence of cryptomnesia, which is where information learned is forgotten but nevertheless stored in the brain, and similar occurrences invoke the contained knowledge, leading to a feeling of familiarity because the event or experience being experienced has already been experienced in the past, known as "déjà vu". Some experts suggest that memory is a process of reconstruction, rather than a recollection of fixed, established events. This reconstruction comes from stored components, involving emotions, distortions, and omissions. Each successive recall of an event is merely a recall of the last reconstruction. The proposed sense of recognition (déjà vu) involves achieving a good match between the present experience and the stored data. This reconstruction, however, may now differ so much from the original event it is as though it had never been experienced before, even though it seems similar.

==== Dual neurological processing ====
In 1965, Robert Efron of Boston's Veterans Hospital proposed that déjà vu is caused by dual neurological processing caused by delayed signals. Efron found that the brain's sorting of incoming signals is done in the temporal lobe of the brain's left hemisphere. However, signals enter the temporal lobe twice before processing, once from each hemisphere of the brain, normally with a slight delay of milliseconds between them. Efron proposed that if the two signals were occasionally not synchronized properly, then they would be processed as two separate experiences, with the second seeming to be a re-living of the first.

=== Dream-based explanation ===
Dreams can also be used to explain the experience of déjà vu, and they are related in three different aspects. The first aspect, various déjà vu experiences duplicate the situation in dreams instead of waking conditions, according to the survey done by Brown (2004). Twenty percent of the respondents reported their déjà vu experiences were from dreams and 40% of the respondents reported from both reality and dreams. Second, people may experience déjà vu because some elements in their remembered dreams were shown. Research done by Zuger (1966) supported this idea by investigating the relationship between remembered dreams and déjà vu experiences, and suggested that there is a strong correlation. Third, people may experience déjà vu during a dream state, which links déjà vu with dream frequency.

=== Collective unconscious ===
Collective unconscious is a controversial theory created by Carl Jung that has been used to explain the phenomenon of déjà vu. If we can access shared knowledge, déjà vu could potentially be an effect of recognizing one of the collectively stored patterns. His theory is that all people have a shared pool of knowledge that has been passed down through generations and we can unconsciously access this knowledge. Some of said knowledge would be about certain archetypes like mother, father and hero or possibly about basic situations, emotions or other patterns. If we can access shared knowledge, déjà vu could potentially be an effect of recognizing one of the collectively stored patterns.

== Related terms ==
=== Jamais vu ===
Jamais vu (from French, meaning "never seen") is any familiar situation which is not recognized by the observer.

Often described as the opposite of déjà vu, jamais vu involves a sense of eeriness and the observer's impression of seeing the situation for the first time, despite rationally knowing that they have been in the situation before. Jamais vu is most commonly experienced when a person momentarily does not recognize a word, person or place that they already know. Jamais vu is sometimes associated with certain types of aphasia, amnesia, and epilepsy.

Theoretically, a jamais vu feeling in someone with a delirious disorder or intoxication could result in a delirious explanation of it, such as in the Capgras delusion, in which the patient takes a known person for a false double or impostor. If the impostor is himself, the clinical setting would be the same as the one described as depersonalization, hence jamais vus of oneself or of the "reality of reality", are termed depersonalization (or surreality) feelings.

The feeling has been evoked through semantic satiation. Chris Moulin of the University of Leeds asked 95 volunteers to write the word "door" 30 times in 60 seconds. Sixty-eight percent of the subjects reported symptoms of jamais vu, with some beginning to doubt that "door" was a real word.

=== Presque vu ===
Presque vu (French pronunciation: [pʁɛsk vy], from French, meaning "almost seen") is the intense feeling of being on the very brink of a powerful epiphany, insight, or revelation, without actually achieving the revelation. The feeling is often therefore associated with a frustrating, tantalizing sense of incompleteness or near-completeness.

=== Déjà vécu ===
Déjà vécu (from French, meaning "already lived") is an intense, but false, feeling of having already lived through the present situation. Recently, it has been considered a pathological form of déjà vu. However, unlike déjà vu, déjà vécu has behavioral consequences. Patients with déjà vécu often cannot tell that this feeling of familiarity is not real. Because of the intense feeling of familiarity, patients experiencing déjà vécu may withdraw from their current events or activities. Patients may justify their feelings of familiarity with beliefs bordering on delusion.

=== Déjà rêvé ===
Déjà rêvé (from French, meaning "already dreamed") is the feeling of having already dreamed something that is currently being experienced.

=== Déjà entendu ===
Déjà entendu (literally "already heard") is the experience of feeling sure about having already heard something, even though the exact details are uncertain or were perhaps imagined.

== See also ==
- Intuition – Ability to acquire knowledge without conscious reasoning
- Repression – Unconscious defense mechanism
- Scientific skepticism – Questioning of claims lacking empirical evidence
- Screen memory – Psychological concept
- Uncanny – Psychological experience of something being strangely familiar
