= Benjamin Paul Blood =

American philosopher (1832–1919)

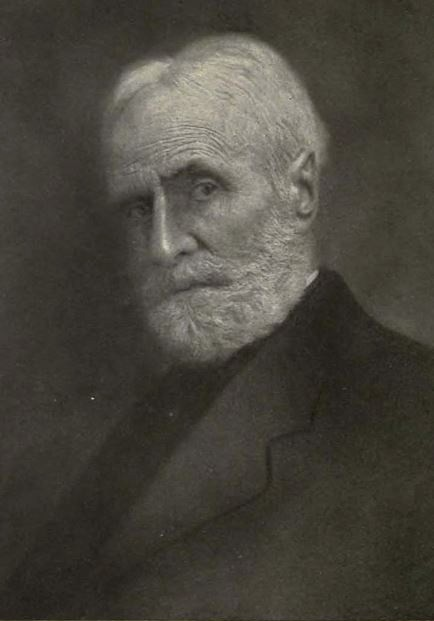
- Born: November 21, 1832; Amsterdam, New York
- Died: January 15, 1919 (aged 86)

Philosophical work
- Era: 19th-/20th-century philosophy
- Region: Western philosophy
- Main interests: Pluralism; poetic mysticism
- Notable ideas: Pluriverse

Benjamin Paul Blood (November 21, 1832 – January 15, 1919) was an American philosopher, mystic and poet. His idiosyncratic work explored his development of his pluralist philosophy, culminating in the posthumously published book Pluriverse.

== Biography ==
Blood was born in Amsterdam, New York. His father, John Blood, was a prosperous landowner. Blood was known as an intelligent man but an unfocused one. Initially, his writing consisted of letters, either to local newspapers or to friends such as James Hutchison Stirling, Alfred Tennyson and William James. Ralph Barton Perry wrote of Blood:

He was born in 1832 and lived for eighty-six years. During that time he wrote much, but unsystematically. His favorite form of publication was letters to newspapers, mainly local newspapers with a small circulation. These letters "dealt with an astonishing diversity of subjects, from local petty politics or the tricks of spiritualist mediums to principles of industry and finance and profundities of metaphysics."

Early books included The Philosophy of Justice Between God and Man (1851) and Optimism: The Lesson of Ages (1860), a Christian mystical vision of the pursuit of happiness from Blood's distinctly American perspective; on the title page of the book, Blood described it as "A compendium of democratic theology, designed to illustrate necessities whereby all things are as they are, and to reconcile the discontents of men with the perfect love and power of ever-present God." During his lifetime he was best known for his poetry, which included The Bride of the Iconoclast, Justice, and The Colonnades. According to Christopher Nelson, Blood was a direct influence on William James' The Varieties of Religious Experience as well on James's concept of Sciousness, prime reality consciousness without a sense of self.

After experiencing the anesthetic nitrous oxide during a dental operation, Blood concluded that the gas had opened his mind to new ideas and continued experimenting with it. In 1874, he published a 37-page pamphlet, The Anesthetic Revelation and the Gist of Philosophy.

He married twice; to Mary Sayles, and following her death, to Harriet Lefferts. He had six children from the first marriage, and a daughter from the second. Blood died in Amsterdam, New York. His final work, Pluriverse, was published posthumously.

== Selected bibliography ==
- Optimism: The Lesson of Ages, 1860
- The Anaesthetic Revelation and the Gist of Philosophy, 1874
- Pluriverse: An Essay in the Philosophy of Pluralism, 1920 (posthumous)

== See also ==
- American philosophy
- List of American philosophers
