= Gestaltzerfall =

Visual object recognition impairment

Gestaltzerfall (German for "shape decomposition" or Gestalt decomposition) is a type of visual agnosia and is a psychological phenomenon where delays in recognition are observed when a complex shape is stared at for a while as the shape seems to decompose into its constituent parts. In plain terms, if a subject reads or hears the same term over and over, that term ceases to have any meaning. With regard to Chinese characters, one study found that after prolonged viewing of one character, recognition of a subsequent one is delayed most when the two are the same size. When the subsequent character is a different size, delays are observed only when the two share the same visual pattern.

Gestaltzerfall has also been described as a phenomenon where the output signals from the brain go beyond their expected range.

== Origin ==
The phenomenon was first described and named by C. Faust in 1947 as a symptom of the bilateral region of the parieto-occipital sulcus after a through-and-through bullet wound of this region. Afterwards, when the subject stared at a truck for a while the truck seemed to decompose into its motor, chassis, driver cab and the person could only focus on one of these parts until he briefly closed his eyes or looked away which reset the shape to the complete truck again.

Gestaltzerfall has also been applied in the case of spoken text where the speaker experiences a slip of the tongue during repeated poetry lectures. The characteristic of orthographic satiation as opposed to semantic satiation is that meaning remains intact. It was suggested that this is different from semantic satiation and from the stimulus familiarization effect because orthographic satiation occurs after the perceivers have access to lexical meaning.

== See also ==
- Reactive inhibition
- Semantic satiation
