= Memoirs of a Suicide =

Memoirs of a Suicide (Portuguese: Memórias de um Suicida) is a channeled afterlife account psychographed by the Brazilian spiritist medium Yvonne Pereira, whose authorship is attributed to the spirit of Portuguese writer Camilo Castelo Branco.

== Plot ==
The book was originally published by the Brazilian Spiritist Federation in 1954, twelve years after its writing, allegedly because it did not fit the usual spiritist novel conventions.

The plot is centered on the afterlife story of Camilo Cândido Botelho (a spiritual pseudonym of Camilo Castelo Branco), who died by suicide on 1 June 1890, after going blind.

Upon death, his spirit perceives the pain from the gunshot to his right ear and brain, along with the odor of his decomposing body. Hearing voices, he joins a crowd that is transported to the "Valley of the Suicides," a dark, inhospitable region of the astral plane where spirits who died by suicide are confined.

The valley features constant noise, screaming, and crying; cloudy, thunderous skies; cold, foul-smelling air; muddy, excrement-covered ground; and surrounding dark caves. Spirits repeatedly relive the circumstances of their deaths and experience the suffering of others around them. Base instincts dominate, preventing peace among inhabitants, sleep, rest, or privacy. Violent and perverse acts occur frequently, with individuals alternating between victim and aggressor roles. The conditions are described as worse than the most severe circumstances on Earth.

After more than ten years of incessant suffering, aggravated by the belief that it was an eternal and hellish punishment, Camilo, was totally exhausted, both physically and mentally. Finally he was rescued by the Servants of Mary, spiritual helpers who took him to the Mary of Nazareth astral hospital, in the twilight zone of a spiritual city.

There the account unfolds with the revelation of the stories of his fellows of misfortune, the pains that caused their self-undoing, their plans for reparatory rebirth and, finally, the karmic cause of Camilo's blindness and his project of upliftment through reincarnation.

The book is a cautionary tale about suicide. Death does not put an end to the suffering of a suicide. On the contrary, it aggravates it and prolongs it, years and sometimes centuries long in the low astral realms. Upon a new rebirth on Earth, most probably one has to endure again the same challenges one had tried to escape through suicide, further aggravated by more physical and existential handicaps than before.

This work was released in 2013 as a radionovela, authorized by the Brazilian Spiritist Federation, on the initiative of José de Paiva-Netto, CEO of Legião da Boa Vontade.
