= Les Écrits nouveaux =

Magazine

- Cover of the August-September 1921 issue
- Editor: Émile-Paul and Maurice Martin du Gard
- Categories: Literary magazine
- Frequency: Monthly
- Publisher: Émile-Paul Frères
- First issue: 1917
- Final issue: 1922
- Country: France
- Based in: Paris
- Language: French
- ISSN: 1147-680X

Les Écrits nouveaux was a literary magazine founded in 1917 and published until 1922.

Les Écrits nouveaux was edited by Émile-Paul and Maurice Martin du Gard, the cousin of Roger Martin du Gard, while the editorial board was made up of Edmond Jaloux, Valery Larbaud, André Germain, and Philippe Soupault.

In 1922, the literary magazine became La Revue européenne.
