= Jamais vu =

Phenomenon in psychology

In psychology, jamais vu (/ʒæmeɪ v(j)uː/ ZHAM-ay VOO, US: /ʒɑːm-/ JAHM-, French: [ʒamɛ vy]), a French loanword meaning "never seen", is the phenomenon of experiencing a situation that one recognizes in some fashion, but that nonetheless seems unusual and unfamiliar. It is often described as the opposite of déjà vu.

== Overview ==
Jamais vu involves a sense of eeriness and the observer’s impression of experiencing something for the first time, despite rationally knowing that they have experienced it before.

Jamais vu is commonly explained as when a person momentarily does not recognize a word or, less commonly, a person or place, that they already know. Jamais vu is sometimes associated with certain types of aphasia, amnesia, and epilepsy.

=== Experiment ===
A study by Chris Moulin of Leeds University asked 92 volunteers to write out "door" 30 times in 60 seconds. He reported that 68 percent of volunteers showed symptoms of jamais vu, such as beginning to doubt that "door" was a real word. Moulin believes that a similar brain fatigue underlies some symptoms of schizophrenia and Capgras delusion. Moulin suggests that people with these conditions could be suffering from chronic jamais vu.

== Causes ==
Jamais vu can be caused by epileptic seizures.

== Related phenomena ==
- Déjà vu: having the strong sensation that an event or experience being experienced, has already been experienced in the past, whether it has actually happened or not. In French, this means 'already seen'.
- Tip of the tongue/Presque vu: almost, but not quite, remembering something.

== See also ==
- Capgras delusion (the delusion that a friend or relative is an impostor)
- Cryptomnesia
- Depersonalization derealization disorder
- Derealization
- Mandela effect
- Semantic satiation
- Uncanny
