= Bridey Murphy =

Purported example of a recalled past life

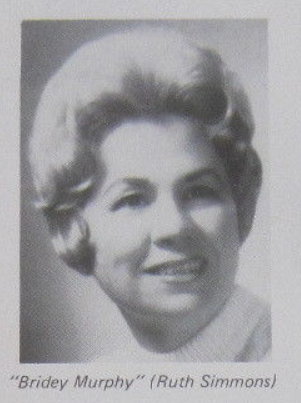
Virginia Tighe, who was given the pseudonym "Ruth Simmons"

Bridey Murphy (December 20, 1798 – 1864) is a purported 19th-century Irishwoman whom U.S. housewife Virginia Tighe (April 27, 1925 – July 12, 1995) claimed to have been in a past life. The case was investigated by researchers and determined to likely be the result of cryptomnesia.

== Hypnotic regression ==
In 1952, Colorado businessman and amateur hypnotist Morey Bernstein (1919–1999) put housewife Virginia Tighe of Pueblo, Colorado, in a trance that elicited revelations about Tighe's alleged past life as a 19th-century Irishwoman. Bernstein used a technique called hypnotic regression, during which the subject is gradually taken back to childhood. He then attempted to take Virginia one step further, before birth (so-called "past life regression"), and was astonished to find he was listening to Bridey Murphy.

Tighe's tale began in 1806, when Bridey was eight years old and living in a house in Cork. She was the daughter of Duncan Murphy, a Protestant barrister, and his wife Kathleen. At the age of 17 (c. 1815), she married Sean Joseph Brian MacCarthy, also a barrister, who she claimed taught at Queen's University in Belfast, to which she moved. Tighe told of a fall down a flight of stairs that caused Bridey's death c. 1864, and of watching her own funeral, describing her tombstone and the state of being in life after death. It was, she recalled, a feeling of neither pain nor happiness.

Somehow, she was reborn in America over 60 years later, although Tighe/Bridey was not clear how this happened. Tighe herself was born Virginia Mae Reese in Madison, Wisconsin in 1925, had never been to Ireland, and did not speak with an Irish accent. Murphy, however, spoke with a heavy brogue and used obscure Irish expressions (some of which were not actually used in the 19th century).

== Book publication and response ==
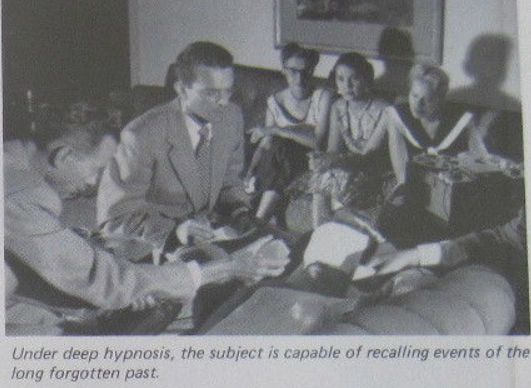
Hypnotist Morey Bernstein with Virginia Tighe

The story of Bridey Murphy was first told in a series of articles by William J. Barker, published in the Denver Post in 1954. In early 1956, Doubleday released a book by Bernstein, The Search for Bridey Murphy. Film rights had already been sold by the time of its publication (see § Film adaptation below). At her insistence, Tighe was given the pseudonym "Ruth Mills Simmons".

=== The Bridey Murphy craze ===
The best-selling book created a sensation; people would throw Bridey Murphy-themed "come as you were" parties and dances, and jokes abounded, such as cartoons of parents greeting newborns with "Welcome back!"

Popular songs of the time included "The Ballad of Bridey Murphy" by Fran Allison, "The Love of Bridey Murphy" by Billy Devroe's Devilaires, and "Do You Believe (In Reincarnation)" by Lalo Guerrero. There was a "Reincarnation cocktail". (Note: A March 1956 issue of Life magazine attributes the cocktail to Walt McCrystal of the "Doctors' Club" of Houston, and gives the following recipe: "a jigger vodka and a 1/2 jigger of maraschino liqueur shaken with lemon juice and crushed ice and topped with a cupful of flaming rum.")

Stan Freberg recorded a satirical sketch in 1956 titled "The Quest For Bridey Hammerschlaugen", parodying the LP released of excerpts of the first hypnosis session. Freberg hypnotizes Goldie Smith (voiced by June Foray) to regress her to different eras, with humorous interruptions by Smith. At the end, Smith hypnotizes Freberg, who becomes Davy Crockett. When Smith mocks Freberg-as-Crockett for not being able to profit from the recent Davy Crockett craze, "Crockett" replies that in his next life, he "may be Walt Disney."

The past-life themed 1956 film I've Lived Before is said to have been inspired by the craze.

=== Research challenging the story ===
The biographical details related by Bridey were not rigorously checked before the book's publication. However, once the book became a bestseller, almost every detail was investigated by reporters who were sent to Ireland to track down the background of the elusive woman. It was then that the first doubts about her "reincarnation" began to appear.

Bridey said she was born on December 20, 1798, in Cork and that she died in 1864. No record was found of either event. Also, no evidence was found of a wooden house called The Meadows—in which Bridey said she had lived—just of a place of that name near Cork. Additionally, during the 19th century, most houses in Ireland were made of brick or stone. Bridey pronounced her husband's name as "See-an", although Seán is typically pronounced "Shawn", especially in Ireland. Queen's University Belfast did not exist at the time Bridey alleged her husband was working there. Brian, which is what Bridey preferred to call her husband, was also the middle name of the man to whom Virginia Tighe was married. Tighe claimed Bridey went to St. Theresa's Church, but it was not built until 1911, long after Bridey was said to have died.

Some of the details provided by Tighe proved to be more plausible. For example, her descriptions of the Antrim coastline were very accurate, as was her account of a journey from Belfast to Cork. She recounted that the young Bridey shopped for provisions with grocers named John Carrigan and William Farr; it was subsequently learned that men of that name and trade had existed during the time period, although it may simply have been a coincidence.

Some researchers came to the conclusion that the best way to discover the truth was to check back not to Ireland, but rather to Tighe's own childhood and her relationship with her parents. Morey Bernstein stated that Tighe/Simmons was brought up by a Norwegian uncle and his German-Scottish-Irish wife. However, he did not mention that her birth parents were both partly Irish, and that she had lived with them until the age of three. He also did not mention that an Irish immigrant named Bridie Murphy Corkell (1892–1957) lived across the street from Tighe's childhood home in Chicago, Illinois. Bridie emigrated to the U.S. in 1908. Although Tighe claimed she did not know Mrs. Corkell's maiden name, Bridie's spinster sister Margaret Murphy was living with the Corkells in the 1930 census. Researchers noted that many of the elements Virginia Tighe described in Bridey's life corresponded to ones in her own childhood. Similarly, Tighe had used an Irish brogue in theatrical plays as a teenager. Cryptomnesia has been mentioned as an explanation for Tighe's memories.

Because Bridey Murphy's story has correlations with Tighe's own life, and has discrepancies with the Ireland of Murphy's purported time period, writers such as Michael Shermer consider any paranormal interpretation of the case to be "thoroughly disproven".

== Film adaptation ==
Bernstein's book The Search for Bridey Murphy was made into a 1956 film of the same name. Produced by Paramount, the film starred Teresa Wright as Ruth Simmons, and Louis Hayward as Morey Bernstein. It was directed by Noel Langley.

== Later events ==
Bernstein gave up hypnotism after Bridey Murphy, and began working in business. Success followed, and he became a prominent local philanthropist. He died in Pueblo, Colorado, in April 1999. In his obituary, The New York Times characterized the eventual feelings held by supporters of the story: "Although Bridey believers concede that the various investigations failed to prove that she had lived as she had been described, they also insist that the investigations failed to prove she had not."

Virginia Tighe disliked being in the spotlight and was skeptical about reincarnation, but in later years she would add, "The older I get the more I want to believe." She died in Denver in 1995 (as The New York Times later put it, "perhaps for the second time").

== See also ==
- On a Clear Day You Can See Forever, a 1965 Broadway musical with a past-life theme, loosely based on the 1926 play Berkeley Square
