= Hélène Smith =

French occultist (1861–1929)

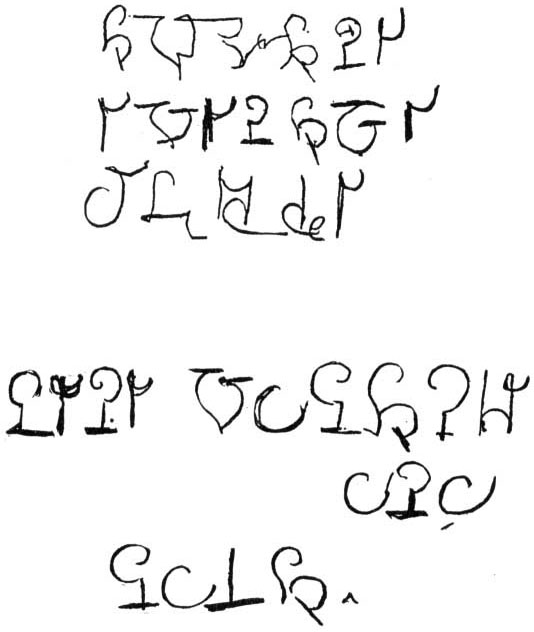
Automatic writing in "Martian" produced by Smith at a séance

Catherine-Elise Müller (December 9, 1861, Martigny – June 10, 1929, Geneva), known professionally as Hélène Smith, was a famous late-19th-century French medium. She was known as "the Muse of Automatic Writing" by the Surrealists, who viewed Smith as evidence of the power of the surreal, and a symbol of surrealist knowledge. Late in life, Smith claimed to communicate with Martians, and to be a reincarnation of a Hindu princess and Marie Antoinette.

== Early life ==
Daughter of a Hungarian merchant, Smith worked as an employee in a commercial house. She discovered spiritualism in 1891 and joined a spiritualist "development" circle. According to her fellow believers, she began to show evidence of mediumistic abilities in 1892, and claimed to communicate with Victor Hugo and Cagliostro.

== Career as medium ==
She became well known in Geneva, and it was there that Flournoy made her acquaintance. Her channeling evolved from the usual raps and table-tipping to somnambulatory trances, of which she remembered nothing. While in this state she experienced clear images of faraway places such as a civilization on Mars, and of her own former lives. She would write out the Martian communications on paper and translate them into French, popularizing automatic writing.

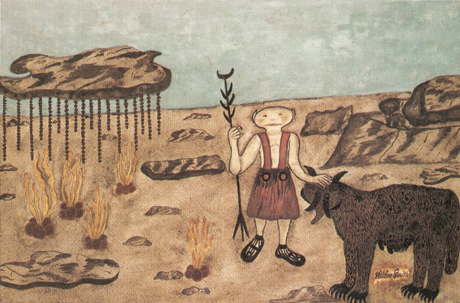
Martian Landscape

In 1900, Élise Müller became famous with the publication of Des Indes à la Planete Mars ("From India to the Planet Mars") by Théodore Flournoy, Professor of Psychology at the University of Geneva. The medium and the psychologist remained very close until 1899, when "Des Indes à la planète Mars" was first published. The book documented her various series of experiences in terms of romantic cycles: the "Martian" cycle, "Ultramartian" cycle, "Hindu", "Oriental", and "royal" cycles.

In 1900, a certain Mrs. Jackson, a rich American spiritualist who was impressed by Müller, offered her a salary which would permit her to quit her job and dedicate herself to pursuing and documenting her experiences. Müller accepted and was able to continue with further cycles. She also began to paint her visions and particular religious images of Christ.

Smith is mentioned by André Breton in his book Nadja where he compares her to the eponymous character.

"A brief scene in dialogue at the end of my "Poisson Soluble," and which seems to be all she has yet read of the Manifest, a scene whose precise meaning moreover...gives her the impression of having actually participated in it and even of having played the-if anything obscure- part of Hélène."

== Evaluation ==
Théodore Flournoy considered her "cycles" as the products of what he judged to be infantile imaginings and her Martian language as a mere constructed language. Flournoy concluded that her "Martian" language had a strong resemblance to Ms. Smith's native language of French and that her automatic writing was "romances of the subliminal imagination, derived largely from forgotten sources (for example, books read as a child)." He invented the term cryptomnesia to describe this phenomenon.

Psychologists Leonard Zusne, Warren H. Jones have written:

Flournoy was able to show her Martian language was an artful fabrication. Although it sounded decidedly foreign, frequency analysis of words and letters and an examination of the syntax convinced Flournoy that the language had all the basic structural characteristics of French, Hélène Smith's native tongue. In a subsequent investigation, Flournoy reported that the source of a short phrase that she had written in Arabic during her Indian cycle probably came from having seen an identical phrase inscribed in a book owned by a Genevan physician. She had retained a visual image of the script and, in due time, copied it from memory in an uncertain hand.

The case was examined in depth by psychologist Donovan Rawcliffe in 1952 who noted that Smith had suffered from a fantasy prone personality and hysterical hallucinations.
