= Reactive inhibition =

Reactive inhibition is a phrase coined by Clark L. Hull in his 1943 book titled Principles of Behavior. He defined it as:

Whenever any reaction is evoked in an organism there is left a condition or state which acts as a primary negative motivation in that it has an innate capacity to produce a cessation of the activity which produced the state.

Reactive inhibition is typically studied in the context of drive reduction. Hull likens it to fatigue through which humans become tired over time and thus less accurate and precise within a given task. There is significant debate whether the process of reactive inhibition is due to fatigue or some other process. Nevertheless, it is a factor researchers need to consider in analyses of sustained performance due to its possible role in the results and analysis of research.

Hull goes on to further explain the decay of performance through the use of a decay formula which can estimate the rate of performance deterioration.

Hull explains:

I dissipates exponentially with time t:

With the passage of time since its formation I_{R} spontaneously dissipates approximately as a simple decay function of the time t elapsed, i.e.,

$I'_R = I_R x 10^{-at}$ (Hull, 1951, p. 74).

Hull's decay formula is somewhat awkward and might give rise to confusion. For example, I'_{R} does not refer to the derivative of I_{R}. A more convenient way of writing the formula would be as follows:

$$I(t) = I(0) e^{-bt}$$

with $b = a \ln (10)$. $I(0)$ is the inhibition at the beginning of the time interval [0,t]. Note that if one takes the natural logarithm of both sides one obtains:

$$Y(t) = Y(0) - bt$$

where $Y(t) = \ln I(t)$ and $Y(0) = \ln I(0)$. The last formula is used in inhibition theory.

Reactive inhibition is distinct from proactive inhibition. Reactive inhibition occurs after an initial response has been activated and set to be carried out. In contrast, proactive inhibition determines whether or not the response process is activated in the future and occurs before initial activation. Reactive inhibition is considered to be a bottom-up processing process and associated with "lower level mechanisms of inhibition", whereas proactive inhibition is considered more top-down processing and dealing with "higher level mechanisms".

== Applications ==
Reactive inhibition may be important in everyday life during a process in which a decline in performance can be detrimental such as driving a car during rush hour. For example, Kathaus, Washcer, & Getzmann (2018) found that older adults who showed a tendency towards reactive inhibition, determined through electroencephalography measures, showed higher "driving lane variability" and more impairment. Although older adults matched younger adults in their lane keeping abilities, they were unable to change lanes as effectively when they relied on reactive inhibition.

Another study also revolving around younger vs older adults in the realm of inhibition found that older adults had decreased reactive inhibition but sustain proactive inhibition overall. By using a smart phone app, participants played a game in which two apples were falling from either side of the tree. They were to tap either apple but not press one of the apples if that apple turned brown or "rotten". This is similar to a Stop Signal Task as described below. Some of these trials were primed for a person to expect a change and others not. What was found was a decreased ability in older adults to inhibit an action when they were not primed thus indicating a deficit in reactive inhibition.

Researchers have also studied reactive inhibition within the context of ADHD. It is commonly accepted that decreased inhibition abilities are a prominent aspect of the symptoms associated with ADHD. Within the context of the Stop Signal Task studies point to an inability to switch attention the signal switches from a go signal, to stop, which can be compared to environmental changes in the world. Further, it is proven that reactive inhibition in particular is affected in individuals with ADHD and related ADHD symptoms, and may not even have an impact on proactive inhibition at all. The ability to inhibit can impact children's learning abilities and is a lack of reactive inhibition is present in many learning disorders.

== Relationship to learning ==
Reactive inhibition is also related to repetition performance, including learning. For example, Torok et al. (2017) recorded learning capabilities in 180 adults using the Alternating Serial Reaction Time Test. Results showed reactive inhibition had a profound effect on performance. Specifically, they showed that significantly more learning had occurred than was perceived at the end of the task, for reactive inhibition had affected the individual over time. They concluded that reactive inhibition may affect one's rate of learning due to how it causes progressive decline within a task. It was stated to be a feature of performance within 90% of the participants, and thus playing a significant role in results. These findings have caused some researchers to question existing psychological theories. For example, Rickard, Pan, and Albarracín present evidence that even well accepted psychological findings such as memory consolidation during sleep may be incorrect. The increase in "memory" that supposedly occurs after sleep may just be due to reactive inhibition. It may have existed at the end of learning before sleeping occurred, and thus caused seemingly lower memory scores.

Reactive inhibition is often not recognized as a factor of performance in learning based experiments and thus can lead to incorrect results. The presence of reactive inhibition can result in decreased performance over time and thus decrease the level of supposed learning. If tested at a later time, however, when reactive inhibition is not present one may see true measures of learning.

== Stop-signal task (SST) ==
Reactive inhibition within experimental settings is most commonly measured through the stop-signal task (SST). In the SST, a "go-signal" is presented to the participant to indicate that he or she should complete an action. Then, in some instances, a "stop-signal" is also presented to the participant indicate he or she should abandon the previously initiated action. This stop signal is presented within hundreds of milliseconds of receiving the go signal. What is important within this task is the stop signal reaction time, which indicates how long it takes reactive inhibition to be triggered and thus for the action to be ceased. Shorter times indicate a person has better reactive inhibition skills, and thus able to more quickly switch from the activation of some response to the abandoning of that goal through reactive inhibition.

Due to the simplicity of the SST some modern researchers are against its use to make broader assumptions about inhibition. The SST's demands on attention and inhibition are relatively low and simple in nature, unlike many real life situations, which makes them distrusting of its results. However, the SST is thought to be more indicative by many of reactive inhibition as opposed to proactive. In addition, reactive inhibition is thought to involve mechanisms that are not context dependent but generally the same amongst many conditions in which contexts are changing and the original "go-signal" explicitly or implicitly stated.

== Relationship with Parkinson's Disease ==
Reactive inhibition is negatively affected by Parkinson's disease. People with Parkinson's disease have difficulty inhibiting their behaviors. It is proposed that levels of Dopamine are directly associated with one's ability to inhibit. Proper inhibition is believed to be successful at some desired level of dopamine. Using the simon task, researchers showed that inhibitory processes were significantly depleted in Parkinson's patients who were withdrawing from their medications, and thus experiencing low levels of dopamine. Performance has been also depleted among high levels of dopamine, indicating that there is an ideal middle ground level of dopamine in which reactive inhibition is most successful. These results suggest an association between dopamine levels and reactive inhibition.

== Brain involvement ==
Reactive inhibition appears to be related to the subthalamic nucleus (STN), particularly within the active inhibition of "overriding the behavior". The STN is in charge of sending a signal to "inhibit thalamo-cortical activation". Thus reaction then causes GABA driven inhibitory signals to be sent to the thalamus which inhibits the behavior. Although reactive inhibition is supported by early STN activity relative to the time of responses, proactive inhibition is defined by more continuous STN activity.

One study has also shown that significant damage to the prefrontal cortex, particularly the right superior medial frontal region, can result in a lack of inhibitory control. When this particular region was damaged patients relied more on last second reactive inhibition to avoid performing inappropriate behaviors.

== See also ==
- Semantic satiation
- Gestaltzerfall
