= Chris Moulin =

Cognitive neuropsychologist

- Education: Bristol University (PhD)
- Awards: Institut Universitaire de France (senior member)
- Scientific career
- Fields: Cognitive neuropsychology
- Workplaces: University of Bristol; University of Reading; Clinical Research Institute at Bath; Institute of Psychological Sciences, University of Leeds; Memory (journal); Université Grenoble Alpes
- Thesis: Does a metacognitive deficit contribute to the episodic memory impairment in Alzheimer's disease? (1999)
- Doctoral advisor: Tim Perfect and Alan Baddeley

Chris Moulin (2023)

Chris Moulin is professor at the Laboratoire de Psychologie et NeuroCognition (LPNC UMR 5105), Université Grenoble Alpes, and a senior member of the Institut Universitaire de France.

Moulin is a cognitive neuropsychologist known for his work in the field of déjà vu which he conducts with his former PhD student Akira O’Connor (who now works at the University of St Andrews). Both psychologists have appeared in BBC radio broadcasts and featured heavily in the popular media in Britain and elsewhere, such as The Guardian, the New York Times Magazine, New Scientist, The Independent and Der Spiegel.

Moulin completed his PhD ("Does a metacognitive deficit contribute to the episodic memory impairment in Alzheimer's disease?") at Bristol University in 1999 under the supervision of Tim Perfect and Alan Baddeley. He then held various Research Fellowships at the Universities of Bristol, Reading and at a Clinical Research Institute at Bath (RICE) and worked in the Institute of Psychological Sciences, University of Leeds between 2002 and 2012. In 2004 and 2005 Moulin organised the BPS Cognitive Section Conference, held in Leeds. He was on the editorial board of the journal Memory.

== Déjà vécu and Recollective Confabulation ==
Moulin's current research interests focus on neuropsychological impairments of memory. In particular, he is interested in the interaction of executive function and long-term memory. Research themes include metacognition, inhibition, and the sensations of memory (déjà vu). Dr. Moulin has been involved in researching recollective confabulation, which was originally described as 'déjà vécu' (a term originally used by Arthur Funkhouser). Recollective confabulation is a rare disorder of recognition memory whereby the person feels that most events in daily life are repetitions of things which have happened before, something often described by carers and healthcare professionals as like chronic or persistent déjà vu.
