= Semantic satiation =

Psychological phenomenon

Semantic satiation is a psychological phenomenon in which repetition causes a word or phrase to temporarily lose meaning for the listener, who then perceives the speech as repeated meaningless sounds. Extended inspection or analysis (staring at the word or phrase for a long time) in place of repetition also produces the same effect.

== History and research ==
Leon Jakobovits James coined the phrase "semantic satiation" in his 1962 doctoral dissertation at McGill University. It was demonstrated as a stable phenomenon that is possibly similar to a cognitive form of reactive inhibition. Before that, the expression "verbal satiation" had been used along with terms that express the idea of mental fatigue. The dissertation listed many of the names others had used for the phenomenon:

Many other names have been used for what appears to be essentially the same process: inhibition (Herbert, 1824, in Boring, 1950), refractory phase and mental fatigue (Dodge, 1917; 1926a), lapse of meaning (Bassett and Warne, 1919), work decrement (Robinson and Bills, 1926), cortical inhibition (Pavlov, 192?), adaptation (Gibson, 1937), extinction (Hilgard and Marquis, 1940), satiation (Kohler and Wallach, 1940), reactive inhibition (Hull, 1913 [sic]), stimulus satiation (Glanzer, 1953), reminiscence (Eysenck, 1956), verbal satiation (Smith and Raygor, 1956), and verbal transformation (Warren, 1961b).

— From Leon Jakobovits James, 1962

James presented several experiments that demonstrated the operation of the semantic satiation effect in various cognitive tasks such as rating words and figures that are presented repeatedly in a short time, verbally repeating words then grouping them into concepts, adding numbers after repeating them out loud, and bilingual translations of words repeated in one of the two languages. In each case, the subjects would repeat a word or number for several seconds, then perform the cognitive task using that word. It was demonstrated that repeating a word prior to its use in a task made the task somewhat more difficult.

An explanation for the phenomenon is that rapid repetition makes both the peripheral sensorimotor activity and central neural activation fire repeatedly. This is known to cause reactive inhibition, hence a reduction in the intensity of the activity with each repetition. Jakobovits James (1962) calls this conclusion the beginning of "experimental neurosemantics".

Studies that further explored semantic satiation include the work of Pilotti, Antrobus, and Duff (1997), which claimed that it is possible that the true locus of this phenomenon is presemantic instead of semantic adaptation. There is also the experiment conducted by Kouinos et al. (2000), which revealed that semantic satiation is not necessarily a byproduct of "impoverishment of perceptual inputs."

== Applications ==
Jakobovits cited several possible semantic satiation applications and these include its integration in the treatment of phobias through systematic desensitization. He argued that "in principle, semantic satiation as an applied tool ought to work wherever some specifiable cognitive activity mediates some behavior that one wishes to alter." An application has also been developed to reduce speech anxiety by stutterers by creating semantic satiation through repetition, thus reducing the intensity of negative emotions triggered during speech.

There are studies that also linked semantic satiation in education. For instance, the work of Tian and Huber (2010) explored the impact of this phenomenon on word learning and effective reading. The authors claimed that this process can serve as a unique approach to test for discounting through loss of association since it allows the separation of the "lexical level from semantic level effects in a meaning-based task that involves repetitions of words." Semantic satiation has also been used as a tool to gain more understanding on language acquisition such as those studies that investigated the nature of multilingualism.

== See also ==
- Buffalo buffalo Buffalo buffalo buffalo buffalo Buffalo buffalo
- Gestaltzerfall
- Jamais vu
- Mantra
- Olfactory fatigue
- Scat singing
