= Joseph Sieber Benner =

American New Thought author (1872–1938)

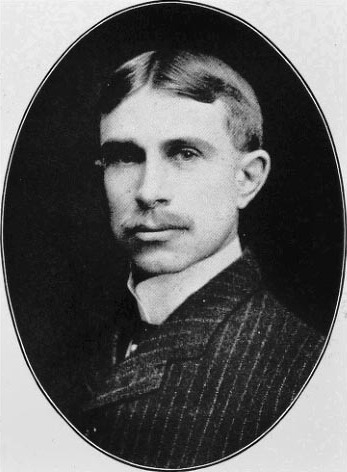
- Joseph S. Benner
- Born: January 3, 1872; Akron, Ohio, USA
- Died: September 24, 1938 (aged 66); Akron, Ohio, USA
- Resting place: Glendale Cemetery, Akron, Ohio
- Known for: Author and publisher
- Spouse: Nillie E. Stuver (m. 1894)
- Children: Mary Joyce Benner McGrath
- Parent(s): John Benner, Mary Sieber

Joseph Sieber Benner (January 3, 1872 – September 24, 1938) was an American author, New Thought writer and Representative of the Brotherhood of Christ who used the pen name "Anonymous". He was the first to introduce the Knowledge and Teachings of Impersonal Life (also known as the "I AM" Teaching) to the world in his first book, The Impersonal Life published in 1914. His other works were The Way Out, The Way Beyond, Wealth, Teacher, Brotherhood, The Way to the Kingdom, Papers (65 Lessons), etc.

== Early life ==
Benner was born in Akron, Ohio, USA on January 3, 1872. His father John W. Benner was a businessman. Benner attended public schools and held positions at J.F. Seiberling & Co., People's Savings Bank Company, Central Savings Bank Company, and Akron Trust Company. He was chief owner of the Akron Printing Company. Benner was also on the boards of the Firestone Tire and Rubber Company, Akron People's Telephone Company, Akron Coal Company, Globe Sign and Poster Company, Hower Building Company, Permanent Savings and Loan Company, Bannock Coal Company, and the Young Men's Christian Association. He remained an officer of the Central Savings and Trust Company for the rest of his career.

In the 1890s, while Secretary of the local YMCA, Benner was also listed as Gymnasium Director of Buchtel College in Akron, and he contributed at least one macabre illustration, titled "Murder", to The Lotus, an Intercollegiate journal published in Kansas City.

Benner married Nillie E. Stuver in 1894. Both were members of the Lutheran Church. They had one child, Mary Joyce Benner McGrath.

== Spiritual writer ==
According to author Jon Klimo, "by 1916, Benner said he felt he could no longer resist the growing inclination to give himself over as a vehicle to a larger presence, to let his mind be subsumed by (or co-creatively interact with) a larger Mind or Being." His book The Impersonal Life contained words Benner believed were recorded directly from God, and was first published in July 1914. Benner taught that Christ's proclaiming "I AM" indicated "the true spirit that resides in every human being." The "SUN center" was an Ohio group formed in 1920 around Benner's teachings. One of the group's practices was to "enter into the silence, stillness and peace" each day at noon. Benner also made a series of lessons called the "Inner Life Courses" he intended to develop discipline in life, discernment and the awakening of the Christ within the soul.

Benner died in 1938. According to his daughter, letters were found after his death in which he expressed devotion to God and his belief that God had chosen him as a medium.

== Theory ==
In his writing, Benner expresses the New Thought concept that we are all one with God, and that God endows each of us with the power to create our experiences and reality by means of sustained, believed thoughts.

His book, The Impersonal Life, is difficult for many persons who are new to the theory. In the first chapter, Benner repeatedly uses the phrase, "I AM," to express the concept that God is inside of each one of us, doing the thinking and creating.

Benner seems to be using his first chapter as a litmus test, to drive off readers who are not committed to his premise that we are all "one with each other and with God." He believed sustained thought has the power to create. Benner describes the process as follows:

In accordance with the definiteness with which the picture of the Idea is held in the mind, and the extent to which the Idea possesses the personality does its creative Power, impelled by Desire, proceed with It's work. . . . When the Word is spoken, either silently or audibly, consciously or unconsciously, this substance at once begins to materialize Itself, by first directing and controlling the consciousness and all of the activities of both mind and body, and of all the minds and all bodies connected with or related to the Idea, -- for remember, all consciousness, and all minds and all bodies are Mine, and are not separated but are One . . . and then so attracting, directing, shaping and molding conditions, things and events, that, sooner or later, the Idea actually comes forth into definite, tangible manifestation.

In other words, Benner contends that a sustained believed image, projected into the Universal Mind, has the ability to control not just one's own thoughts and behaviors -- but the thoughts and behaviors of all humanity—causing the image to ultimately become reality for the person projecting that image.

=== The Way Out -- Textbook on the Law of Attraction ===
Benner's book The Way Out—written in 1931—is a textbook on how to use the Law of Attraction. He describes the law as follows: "Whatever you think and hold in consciousness as being so, out manifests itself in your body or affairs."

In other words, the thoughts themselves are but mental forms, but when you think them with feeling of any kind you fill these forms with life and they become as living things which ever return to you, their parent, to be fed with more living power. . . . You can see now that it is all a matter of consciousness, of thinking and harboring the right kind of thoughts you wish to outmanifest, and of letting into your mind no thoughts you do not want to manifest in your body or affairs.

Benner emphasizes to take no thought, or be anxious about anything, that you wish to manifest. He says to "stand guard continually at the door of your mind, and to let in no thoughts or feelings that you do not want to outmanifest. . . . Guard the door from every negative thought."

If you will keep all such untrue thoughts out of your mind, you can see that then and then only can your Higher Self draw into your mind the true and positive thoughts that will attract to you the good that is waiting to manifest itself to you.

== Influence ==
Elvis Presley considered Benner's book, The Impersonal Life, to be one of his favorite books, he was introduced to it by his hairdresser-turned-guru, Larry Geller, in 1964. According to biographer Albert Goldman, Benner claimed to speak as the Voice of God in the book, which was why the book had no author byline, and Elvis was attracted to the idea that God was not "some bearded old patriarch riding on a thunderhead but the Voice within", an idea which would greatly influence Elvis.

In the last 13 years of his life, Elvis gave away hundreds of copies of the book. Biographer Jess Stearn wrote that Elvis "gave away spiritual books by the score. It was nothing for him to buy one hundred copies of The Impersonal Life and give them away to the first one hundred people he saw." According to Goldman, Elvis allegedly had a copy of the book with him on the night he died.

Benner also influenced the religious leader Father Divine, who claimed to be God in the flesh.

== Books ==
- The Impersonal Life (1914)
- Christ in You (1918)
- The Way Out (1930)
- The Way Beyond (1931)
- The Way to the Kingdom (1932)
- The Teacher (ca 1919/1920)
- Brotherhood (1927)
- Wealth (1927)
- The "Sun Papers" 65 essays on different subjects, published monthly between 1929 and 1935.
- Good and Evil (out of print)
- Receiving and Giving (out of print)
- The Great White Brotherhood (out of print)
