= Sciousness =

Consciousness separate from consciousness of self

Sciousness, a term coined by William James in The Principles of Psychology, refers to consciousness separate from consciousness of self. James wrote:

Instead of the stream of thought being one of con-sciousness, 'thinking its own existence along with whatever else it thinks'...it might better be called a stream of Sciousness pure and simple, thinking objects of some of which it makes what it calls a 'Me,' and only aware of its 'pure' Self in an abstract, hypothetic or conceptual way. Each 'section' of the stream would then be a bit of sciousness or knowledge of this sort, including and contemplating its 'me' and its 'not-me' as objects which work out their drama together, but not yet including or contemplating its own subjective being.

When James first introduced "sciousness" he held back from proposing it as a possible prime reality in The Principles of Psychology, warning that it "traverse[s] common sense." He allowed that he might return to a consideration of sciousness at the conclusion of the book, where he would "indulge in some metaphysical reflections," but it was not until two years later in his conclusion to the abridged edition of The Principles that he added:

Neither common-sense, nor psychology so far as it has yet been written, has ever doubted that the states of consciousness which that science studies are immediate data of experience. "Things" have been doubted, but thoughts and feelings have never been doubted. The outer world, but never the inner world, has been denied. Everyone assumes that we have direct introspective acquaintance with our thinking activity as such, with our consciousness as something inward and contrasted with the outer objects which it knows. Yet I must confess that for my part I cannot feel sure of this conclusion. Whenever I try to become sensible of thinking activity as such, what I catch is some bodily fact, an impression coming from my brow, or head, or throat, or nose. It seems as if consciousness as an inner activity were rather a postulate than a sensibly given fact, the postulate, namely, of a knower as correlative to all this known; and as if "sciousness" might be a better word by which to describe it. But "sciousness postulated as a hypothesis" is a practically a very different thing from "states of consciousness apprehended with infallible certainty by an inner sense." For one thing, it throws the question of who the knower really is wide open...

Then thirteen years later, writing solely as a philosopher, James returned to his "parenthetical digression" of sciousness that "contradict[ed] the fundamental assumption of every philosophic school." James had founded a new school of philosophy, called "radical empiricism," and nondual sciousness was its starting point. He even wrote a note to himself to "apologize for my dualistic language, in the Principles." James did not continue to use the word "sciousness" in later essays on radical empiricism, but the concept is clearly there as the "plain, unqualified ... existence" he comes to call "pure experience," in which there is "no self-splitting ... into consciousness and what the consciousness is of."

Pure experience sciousness was mostly attacked when first presented. With some notable exceptions, such as Bergson, Dewey, and Whitehead, Western philosophers rejected James' view. That rejection continues to this day.

One of the first to appreciate James's concept was the Swiss psychologist Theodore Flournoy, a mentor of Jung. In a book about James he wrote:

...while most philosophers conceive ... [a] primordial state, the origin of all psychic life, as a purely subjective state from which subsequent evolution draws forth (no one knows how) the idea of a non-self and the representation of an exterior world, for James, on the contrary, these primordial facts, these pure experiences are entirely objective, simple phenomena of 'sciousness' and not of 'consciousness.' This means that he holds that the distinction between self and non-self, implied in the word 'consciousness,' from which we are in a normal state unable to free ourselves, is not primary, but results from a conceptual sorting and classifying of the primitive experiences.

The 20th century philosopher Kitaro Nishida—introduced to James by D.T. Suzuki—compared James's concept of sciousness and his phrase "pure experience" to tathata or suchness.

Yet James scholars today still do not agree on how receptive James himself remained to sciousness. As psychologist Benny Shanon observed recently:

Most pertinent ... is William James with his notion of sciousness which comes in contrast to consciousness. The former consists of pure experience only, the latter involves knowledge of experience. The crucial question is whether mere sciousness does in fact exist. In a most insightful scholarly discussion, Bricklin (Journal of Transpersonal Psychology , 2003) argues that basically the Jamesian position is positive in this regard. Natsoulas (Philosophical Psychology, 1993; Journal of Mind and Behavior , 1996) argues that James vacillated on this issue. I would say that the topic calls for much further examination.Karl Jaspers Forum

== Bibliography ==
- Andrew Bailey, "The Strange Attraction of Sciousness: William James on Consciousness" (1988), Transactions of the Charles S. Peirce Society 34, pp. 414–434
- Jonathan Bricklin, Ed., Sciousness, Guilford, CT: Eirini Press, ISBN 978-0-9799989-0-4
- William James, The Principles of Psychology, with introduction by George A. Miller (1890/1983), Cambridge, Mass: Harvard University Press, paperback, ISBN 0-674-70625-0
- William James, Psychology (Briefer Course) (1892), University of Notre Dame Press 1985: ISBN 0-268-01557-0, New York: Dover Publications 2001: ISBN 0-486-41604-6
- Thomas Natsoulas, "The sciousness hypothesis: Part I" (1996), Journal of Mind and Behavior 17 (1): 45–66
- Kitaro Nishida, An Enquiry into the Good (1992), Tr. by Masao Abe & Christopher Ives, New Haven: Yale University Press
- Eugene Taylor and Robert Wozniak, eds., Pure Experience: The response to William James (1996), Bristol, England: Thoemnes
