= Psychograph =

Phrenology machine

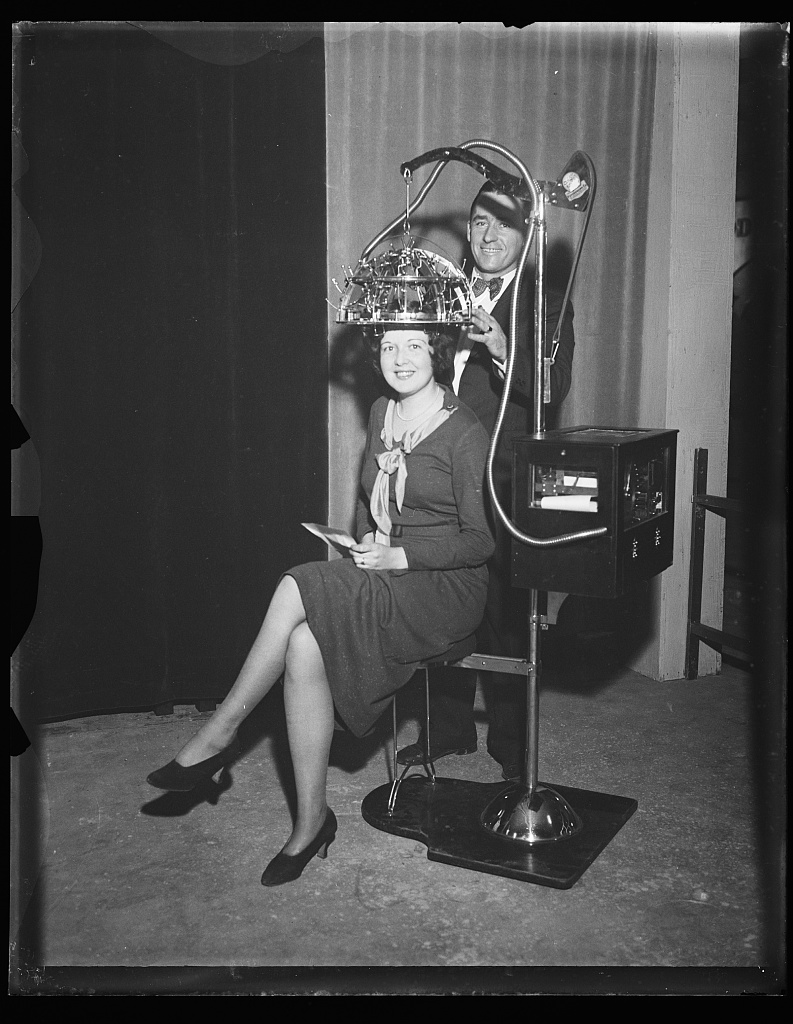
A man fitting a psychograph on a woman's head.

The psychograph was a phrenology machine, invented and marketed by Henry C. Lavery in the early part of the 20th century.

The psychograph claimed to mechanically discern a subject's aptitudes in a number of mental faculties. It was designed to measure the person's head according to the principles of phrenology. Lavery patented his first psychograph in 1905 while living in Superior, Wisconsin. Eventually he joined with Frank P. White to form the Psychograph Company, based in Minneapolis, Minnesota, which operated from 1929 to 1937. They produced a machine which measured the subject's head at 32 points and used those measurements to report the person's supposed mental attributes on a five-point scale ranging from "deficient" to "very superior".

The partners had some initial success in selling or leasing out the psychograph. The machines were sometimes installed in theater lobbies or department stores as novelty items for customers to use. The popularity of the device helped maintain interest in phrenology in America well into the 1930s. In the late 1930s the psychograph was withdrawn from the market due to falling sales and increased skepticism from the public.

There is a psychograph on display at the Museum of Questionable Medical Devices, located at the Science Museum of Minnesota. Visitors to the museum can "have their heads examined" with the machine.
