= Olfactory fatigue =

Inability to distinguish an odor after prolonged exposure

Olfactory fatigue, also known as odor fatigue, odor habituation, olfactory adaptation, or noseblindness, is the temporary, normal inability to distinguish a particular odor after a prolonged exposure to that airborne compound. For example, when entering a restaurant initially the odor of food is often perceived as being very strong, but after time passes the awareness of the odor normally fades to the point where the smell is not perceptible or is much weaker. After leaving the area of high odor, the sensitivity is restored with time. Anosmia is the permanent loss of the sense of smell, and is different from olfactory fatigue.

It is a term commonly used in wine tasting, where one loses the ability to smell and distinguish a wine's bouquet after sniffing at wine continuously for an extended period of time. The term is also used in the study of indoor air quality, for example, in the perception of odors from people, tobacco, and cleaning agents. Since odor detection may be an indicator that exposure to certain chemicals is occurring, olfactory fatigue can also reduce one's awareness of chemical hazard exposure.

Olfactory fatigue is an example of neural adaptation. The body becomes desensitized to stimuli to prevent the overloading of the nervous system, thus allowing it to respond to new stimuli that are 'out of the ordinary'.

== Mechanism ==
Odorants are small molecules present in the environment that bind receptors on the surface of cells called olfactory receptor neurons (ORNs). ORNs are present in the olfactory epithelium which lines the nasal cavity and are able to signal due to an internal balance of signal molecules which vary in concentration depending on the presence or absence an odorant. When odorants bind receptors on ORNs, Ca^{2+} ions flood into the cell causing depolarization and signaling to the brain. Increased Ca^{2+} also activates a negative, stabilizing feedback loop which lowers the olfactory neuron's sensitivity the longer it is stimulated by an odorant to prevent overstimulation. This happens by limiting the amount of cyclic AMP (cAMP) in the cell and by making the Ca^{2+}-importing channels which cAMP binds to be less responsive to cAMP, both effects reducing further intake of Ca^{2+} and thus limiting depolarization and signaling to the brain. The same mechanism which allows for signaling also limits signaling for prolonged periods of time; the first cannot occur without the second.

On the molecular level, as ORNs depolarize in response to an odorant the G-protein mediated second messenger response activates adenylyl cyclase. This increases cyclic AMP (cAMP) concentration inside the ORN, which then opens a cyclic nucleotide gated cation channel. The influx of Ca^{2+} ions through this channel triggers olfactory adaptation immediately because Ca^{2+}/calmodulin-dependent protein kinase II or CaMK activation directly represses the opening of cation channels, inactivates adenylyl cyclase, and activates the phosphodiesterase that cleaves cAMP. This series of actions by CaMK desensitizes olfactory receptors to prolonged odorant exposure.

== Mitigating scent effects on olfactory fatigue ==
According to a study by Grosofsky, Haupert and Versteeg, "fragrance sellers often provide coffee beans to their customers as a nasal palate cleanser" to reduce the effects of olfactory adaptation and habituation. In their study, participants sniffed coffee beans, lemon slices, or plain air. Participants then indicated which of four presented fragrances had not been previously smelled. The results indicated that coffee beans did not yield better performance than lemon slices or air.

== See also ==
- Adaptive system
- Anosmia
- Banner blindness
- Building Indoor Environment
- Olfaction
- Palate cleanser
- Phantosmia
- Semantic satiation
- Thermal comfort
