= Théodore Flournoy =

Swiss professor of psychology

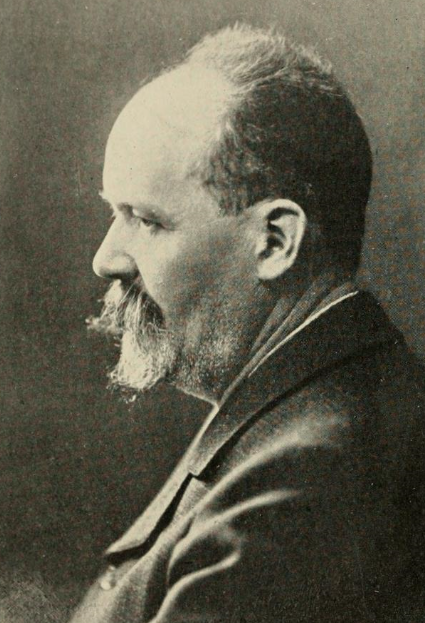
- Born: 15 August 1854; Geneva, Switzerland
- Died: 5 November 1920 (aged 66); Geneva, Switzerland
- Known for: Study of spiritism and psychic phenomena
- Scientific career
- Fields: Psychology
- Workplaces: University of Geneva

Théodore Flournoy (15 August 1854 – 5 November 1920) was a Swiss professor of psychology at the University of Geneva and author of books on parapsychology and spiritism. He studied a wide variety of subjects before he devoted his life to psychology. He did extensive observations on a participant to investigate psychical phenomena. He was the President of the Sixth International Congress of Psychology, the Chair of Experimental Psychology at the University of Geneva in 1891 and was the first professor of psychology in Europe to become a member of the Faculty of Sciences instead of the Faculty of Philosophy.

== Early life ==
Theodore Flournoy was born on 15 August 1854, in Geneva, Switzerland. He was born into a well-off family. His father Alexander Flournoy was a stockbroker and his mother Caroline came from a long line of ministers, judges, and teachers. He attended the University of Strasbourg Medical School as well as the University of Geneva. He received bachelors degrees in mathematics, natural sciences, literature, and engineering. Flournoy also had interests in philosophy, theology, and medicine. Flournoy could have been a doctor, but never went into practice. He did a short stint in Germany where he was interested in studying philosophy. He had a particular interest in Immanuel Kant. While in Germany, he attended classes taught by Wilhelm Wundt. In his travels, he became acquaintances with William James and Alfred Binet who both also had significant contributions to psychology in their lifetimes. After returning from his time away, he met and married Marie Burnier. It wasn't until later in his life that he decided to devote himself to the study of psychology.

== Medium studies ==
His book Spiritism and Psychology (1911) translated by Hereward Carrington claimed more broadly that mediumship could be explained by suggestion and telepathy from the medium's subconscious mind and that there was no evidence for the spirit hypothesis.

== Research ==
Flournoy is most known for his research on psychical phenomena. This was the study of mediumship, apparitions, clairvoyance, healings, poltergeists, premonitions, and thought transference. Flournoy knew when he began his research that he was going to receive criticism from other psychologists, as the research he was conducting seemed bizarre at the time. However, as he began his research it seemed that interest in the subject began to expand in other countries. Flournoys study was based on research he conducted on a 30-year-old woman whom he called Helene Smith. Helene Smith was a woman with a regular job and had sound health and mind. She was well known in the community for her spiritual practices. She had practiced her abilities for three years before Flournoy began his research. All who knew her would say that she was an honest woman. This is important to know because of the nature of her claims. She was a medium who relayed supernatural information through a tranced state. Once Flournoy got into contact with her, he copied down everything the woman said while in a tranced state for the next five years. From what he observed came his most popular book, From India to Planet Mars. The book was published in 1900.

== Accomplishments ==
He was the President of the Sixth International Congress of Psychology, the Chair of Experimental Psychology at the University of Geneva in 1891 and was the first professor of psychology in Europe to become a member of the Faculty of Sciences instead of the Faculty of Philosophy. Flournoy received the Chair of Experimental Psychology after starting and implementing a course in physiological psychology. After his implementation of this course he was given his very first laboratory at the university. However, several years later it caught fire. Flournoy was said to have written a letter to William James stating that he was not upset about the fire because he was getting tired of doing experimental research anyway. In the end, the laboratory was rebuilt, and Flournoy remained there for a few more years before starting another chapter in his life.

== Influence ==
Flournoy was a contemporary of Freud. His work had influenced C. G. Jung. In 1902 Jung made a study of a medium - his cousin Hélène Preiswerk - which became Jung's doctoral dissertation. Jung then used the autosuggestive writings of Miss Frank Miller (1905), made at Flournoy's request, as the starting-point for his 1912 book Psychology of the Unconscious. For Part II of that book, Jung took inspiration from Flournoy's concept of a purposeful component in the unconscious to preserve life, stated in his 1908 paper, "Anti-Suicidal Teleological Automatisms". Flournoy here presented cases "where persons contemplating suicide had last minute visions persuading them of the meaning and value of life."

Flournoy himself was influenced by William James. He was one of the few scholars of his time to embrace the prime reality of non-dual consciousness, a view James had dubbed "sciousness" in his essay, Radical Empiricism. Flournoy wrote the introductory work, The Philosophy of William James (1911).

== Works ==
- From India to Planet Mars, Théodore Flournoy, 1900.

== See also ==
- Édouard Claparède
- Morton Prince
- Multiple personality disorder
