= Philippe Soupault =

French writer (1897–1990)

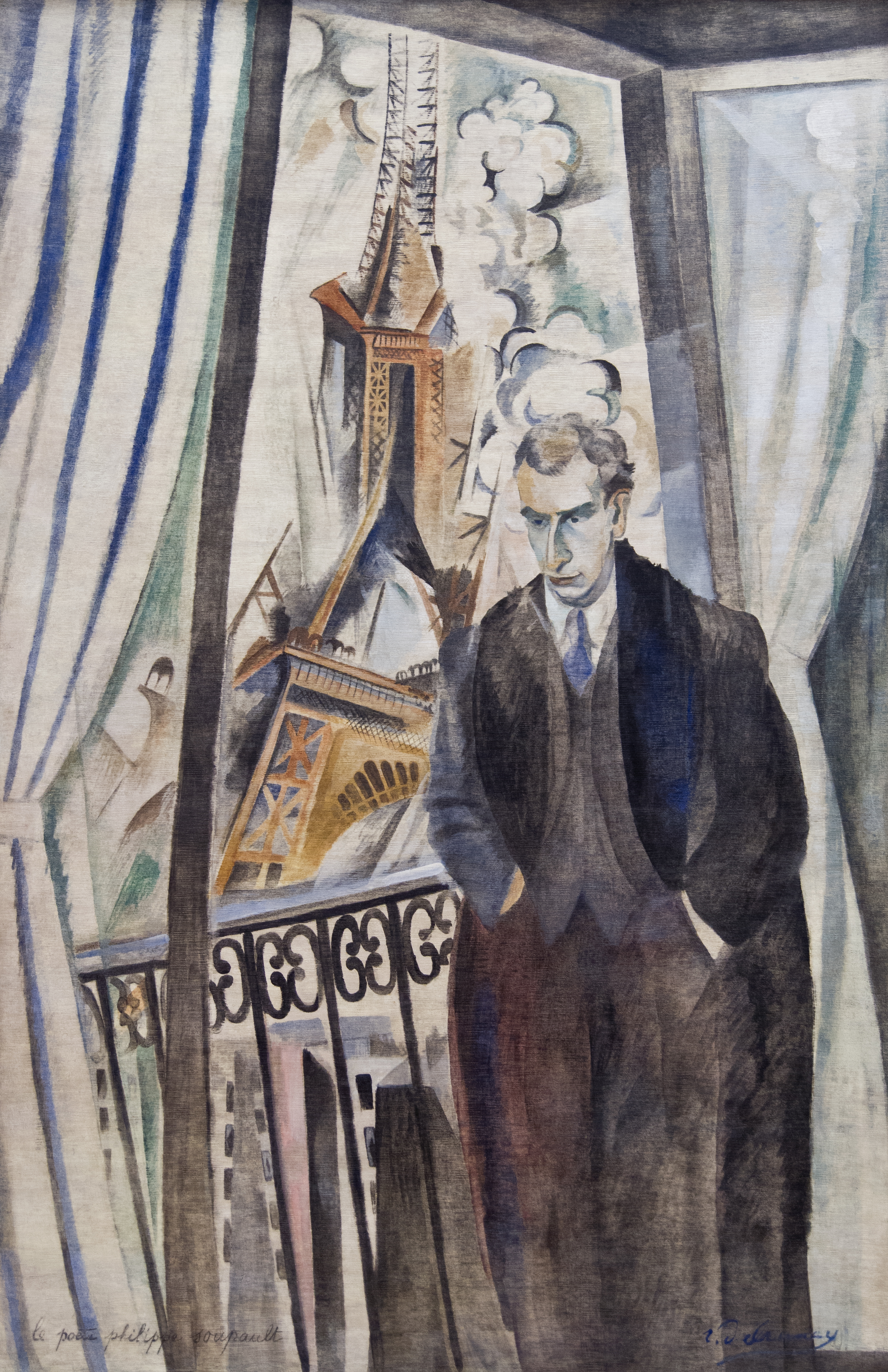
Portrait of Philippe Soupault by Robert Delaunay (1922)

Philippe Soupault (French: [filip supo]; 2 August 1897 – 12 March 1990) was a French poet, novelist, critic, and political activist, born in Chaville. He was active in Dadaism and later was instrumental in founding the Surrealist movement with André Breton. Soupault initiated the periodical Littérature together with writers Breton and Louis Aragon in Paris in 1919, which, for many, marks the beginnings of Surrealism. The first book of automatic writing, Les Champs magnétiques (1920), was co-authored by Soupault and Breton.

== Biography ==
In 1922 he was asked to reinvent the literary magazine Les Écrits nouveaux, for which he also created an editorial board. In 1927 Soupault, with the help of his then wife Marie-Louise, translated William Blake's Songs of Innocence and of Experience into French. The next year, Soupault authored a monograph on Blake, arguing the poet was a "genius" whose work anticipated the Surrealist movement in literature.

In 1933 at a reception at the Soviet Embassy in Paris, he met Ré Richter, and they decided to do some travel reportage together. Ré Richter's photographs, taken with her 6x6 Rolleiflex, were to be published alongside Philippe Soupault's literary texts. In the following years, the two of them continued in the same vein, travelling to Germany, Switzerland, England, Scandinavia and Tunisia. They married in 1937 and separated after the end of the war; he moved back to Europe, and she remained in New York for some time.

Soupault directed Radio Tunis from 1937 until 1940, when he was arrested by the pro-Vichy regime. After imprisonment by the Nazis in Tunis during World War II, he and his wife fled to Algiers. From there, they traveled to the United States. He took a teaching position at Swarthmore College, but returned subsequently to France in October 1945. His works include large volumes of poetry such as Aquarium (1917) and Rose des vents (Compass Card) (1919), and the novel Les Dernières Nuits de Paris (1928; translated as Last Nights of Paris, 1929).

In 1957, he wrote the libretto for Germaine Tailleferre's opera La Petite Sirène, based on Hans Christian Andersen's tale "The Little Mermaid". The work was broadcast by French Radio National in 1959.

Soupault died in Paris in 1990.

== Legacy ==
In 1990, the year Soupault died, Serbian rock band Bjesovi recorded their version of his poem Georgia in Serbian.

Soupault's short story "Death of Nick Carter" was translated by Robin Walz in 2007, and published in issue 24 of the McSweeney's Quarterly. In 2016, City Lights Bookstore published a book of his essays entitled Lost Profiles: Memoirs of Cubism, Dada, and Surrealism as translated by Alan Bernheimer.

== Selected bibliography ==
=== Poetry ===
- Aquarium (1917)
- Rose des vents (1919)
- Les Champs magnétiques with André Breton (1919)
- Westwego (1922)
- Georgia (1926)
- Il y a un océan (1936)
- Ode to the Bombed London / Odes à Londres bombardée (1944). Bilingual edition, trans. Norman Cameron
- Odes 1943-1946 (1946)
- L’Arme secrète (1946)
- Message de l'île déserte (1942-1944) (1947)
- Chansons (1949)
- Sans phrases (1953)
- Arc-en-ciel (1979)
- Poèmes retrouvés 1918-1981 (1982)
- Poèmes et Poésies (1987)

=== Novels and novellas ===
- Le Bon Apôtre (1923)
- Les Frères Durandeau (1924)
- Voyage d'Horace Pirouelle (1925). The Voyage of Horace Pirouelle, trans. Justin Vicari (Wakefield Press, 2023)
- Le Nègre (1927)
- Les Dernières Nuits de Paris (1928). Last Nights of Paris, trans. William Carlos Williams (Macaulay Company, 1929)
- Le Grand Homme (1929)
- Les Moribonds (1934)

=== Essays ===
- William Blake (1928). William Blake, trans. J. Lewis May (John Lane, 1928)
- Profils perdus (1963). Lost Profiles: Memoirs of Cubism, Dada, and Surrealism, trans. Alan Bernheimer (City Lights, 2016) ISBN 9780872867277

=== Autobiographical writings ===
- L’Invitation au suicide (1921)
- Le Temps des assassins (1945). Age of Assassins: The Story of Prisoner No. 1234, trans. Hannah Josephson (Knopf, 1946)
- Mémoires de l'oubli (1914-1923) (1981)
- Mémoires de l'oubli (1923-1926) (1986)
- Mémoires de l'oubli (1927-1933) (1997)

=== Compilations in English ===
- I'm Lying: Selected Translations of Philippe Soupault, trans. Paulette Schmidt (Lost Roads, 1985)
- Philippe Soupault: Poetry, Prose, and Interviews, trans. Gregg Ellis (Serving House Books, 2025)
