= Les Champs magnétiques =

1920 book by André Breton and Philippe Soupault

- First edition
- Author: André Breton and Philippe Soupault
- Language: French
- Genre: Surrealist
- Publisher: Au Sans Pareil
- Publication date: 1920
- Publication place: France
- Media type: Print (Hardback & Paperback)
- Pages: 187
- ISBN: 2-07-031877-X (reissue)

Les Champs magnétiques (The Magnetic Fields) is a 1920 book by André Breton and Philippe Soupault. It is famous as the first work of literary Surrealism. The authors used a surrealist automatic writing technique.

The book is considered Surrealist, rather than Dadaist, because it attempts to create something new rather than react to an existing work.

Les Champs magnetiques is characterised by rich textured language that often seems to border on the nonsensical. This is considered a "normal" result of automatic writing and is considerably more logical than the output from other Surrealist techniques, such as "exquisite corpse" (a method whereby each of a group of collaborators, in sequence, adds words or images to a composition).

A typical paragraph in (a translation of) Les Champs magnetiques is:

It was the end of sorrow lies. The rail stations were dead, flowing like bees stung from honeysuckle. The people hung back and watched the ocean, animals flew in and out of focus. The time had come. Yet king dogs never grow old – they stay young and fit, and someday they might come to the beach and have a few drinks, a few laughs, and get on with it. But not now. The time had come; we all knew it. But who would go first?

The division between chapters was the point where the writers stopped writing at the end of the day. The next chapter was started the following morning.

Breton gave many interviews about the creation of the book.
