= Saṃsāra =

Indian concept of the cyclical process of death and rebirth

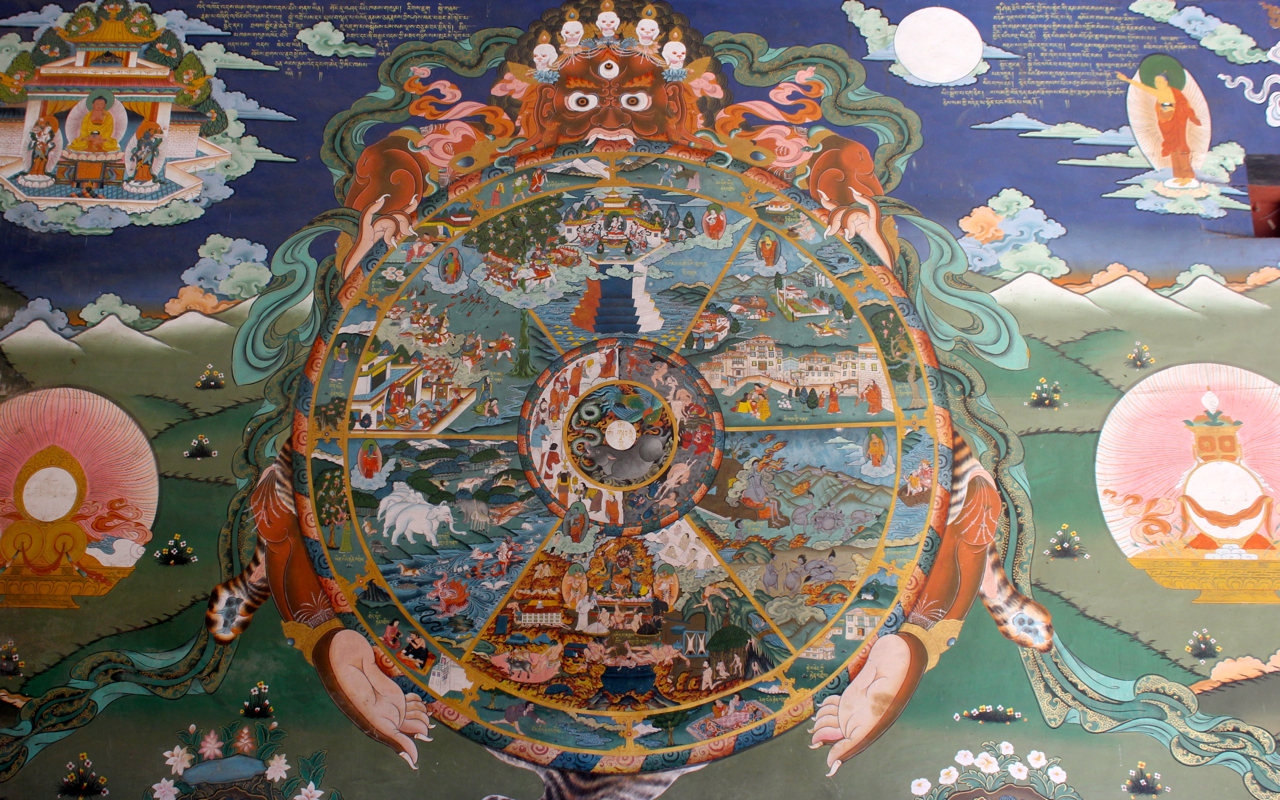
According to the rebirth doctrine of Buddhism, a sentient being can reincarnate into six realms of existence. The bhavachakra depicts this cycle of saṃsāra in a wheel. Māra is at the top of the outer rim. The outer rim shows the Twelve Nidānas doctrine.

Saṃsāra (Devanagari: संसार) is a Sanskrit word that means "wandering" as well as "world," wherein the term connotes "cyclic change" or, less formally, "running around in circles." In the context of Indian religions and philosophies, saṃsāra is the concept of all beings experiencing an ongoing cycle of death, life, and rebirth. As a result, it can also be equated broadly with transmigration/reincarnation, the karmic cycle, the lesser-used term Punarjanman, or a "cycle of aimless drifting, wandering or mundane existence".

The "cyclicity of all life, matter, and existence" is a fundamental belief of most Indian religions. The concept of saṃsāra has roots in the post-Vedic literature; the theory is not discussed in the Vedas themselves. It appears in developed form, but without mechanistic details, in the early Upanishads. The full exposition of the saṃsāra doctrine is found in early Buddhism and Jainism, as well as in various schools of Hindu philosophy. The saṃsāra doctrine is tied to the karma theory of Hinduism, and the liberation from saṃsāra has been at the core of the spiritual quest of Indian traditions, as well as their internal disagreements. The liberation from saṃsāra is called Moksha, Nirvāṇa, Mukti, or Kaivalya.

== Etymology and definition ==
Saṃsāra (Devanagari: संसार) means "wandering", as well as "world" wherein the term connotes "cyclic change". Saṃsāra, a fundamental concept in all Indian religions, is linked to the karma theory and refers to the belief that all living beings cyclically go through births and rebirths. The term is related to phrases such as "the cycle of successive existence", "transmigration", "karmic cycle", "the wheel of life", and "cyclicality of all life, matter, existence". Many scholarly texts spell saṃsāra as samsara.

According to Monier-Williams, saṃsāra is derived from the verbal root sṛ with the prefix saṃ, Saṃsṛ (संसृ), meaning "to go round, revolve, pass through a succession of states, to go towards or obtain, moving in a circuit". The prefix sam means samyak, or well, and sar means to move. A nominal derivative formed from this root appears in ancient texts as saṃsaraṇa, which means "going around through a succession of states, birth, rebirth of living beings and the world", without obstruction. Another nominal derivative from the same root is saṃsāra, referring to the same concept: a "passage through successive states of mundane existence", transmigration, metempsychosis, a circuit of living where one repeats previous states, from one body to another, a worldly life of constant change, that is rebirth, growth, decay and redeath. Saṃsāra is understood as opposite of moksha, also known as mukti, nirvāṇa, nibbāna or kaivalya, which refers to liberation from the cycle of birth and death.

The word saṃsāra is related to Saṃsṛti, the latter referring to the "course of mundane existence, transmigration, flow, circuit or stream".

The word literally means "wandering through, flowing on", states Stephen J. Laumakis, in the sense of "aimless and directionless wandering". The concept of saṃsāra is closely associated with the belief that the person continues to be born and reborn in various realms and forms.

The earliest layers of Vedic text incorporate the concept of life, followed by an afterlife in heaven and hell based on cumulative virtues (merit) or vices (demerit). However, the ancient Vedic Rishis challenged this idea of afterlife as simplistic, because people do not live an equally moral or immoral life. Between generally virtuous lives, some are more virtuous; while evil too has degrees, and the texts assert that it would be unfair for god Yama to judge and reward people with varying degrees of virtue or vices, in an "either or,” and disproportionate manner. They introduced the idea of an afterlife in heaven or hell in proportion to one's merit, and when this runs out, one returns and is reborn. This idea appears in ancient and medieval texts, as the cycle of life, death, rebirth and redeath, such as section 6:31 of the Mahabharata and section 6.10 of the Devi Bhagavata Purana.

== History ==
The concept of saṃsāra developed in the post-Vedic times, and is traceable in the Samhita layers such as in sections 1.164, 4.55, 6.70 and 10.14 of the Rigveda. While the idea is mentioned in the Samhita layers of the Vedas, there is lack of clear exposition there, and the idea fully develops in the early Upanishads. Damien Keown states that the notion of "cyclic birth and death" appears around 800 BC. The word saṃsāra appears, along with Moksha, in several Principal Upanishads such as in verse 1.3.7 of the Katha Upanishad, verse 6.16 of the Shvetashvatara Upanishad, verses 1.4 and 6.34 of the Maitri Upanishad.

The historical origins of the concept of reincarnation, or punarjanman, are obscure, but the idea appears in texts of both India and ancient Greece during the first millennium BCE. The idea of saṃsāra is hinted in the late Vedic texts such as the Rigveda, but the theory is absent. According to Sayers, the earliest layers of the Vedic literature show ancestor worship and rites such as sraddha (offering food to the ancestors). The later Vedic texts such as the Aranyakas and the Upanishads show a different soteriology based on reincarnation, they show little concern with ancestor rites, and they begin to philosophically interpret the earlier rituals, although the idea is not fully developed yet. It is in the early Upanishads where these ideas are more fully developed, but there too the discussion does not provide specific mechanistic details. The detailed doctrines flower with unique characteristics, starting around the mid 1st millennium BCE, in diverse traditions such as in Buddhism, Jainism and various schools of Hindu philosophy. The evidence for who influenced whom in the ancient times, is slim and speculative, and the odds are the historic development of the Saṃsāra theories likely happened in parallel with mutual influences.

=== Punarmrityu: redeath ===
While saṃsāra is usually described as rebirth and reincarnation (punarjanman) of living beings (jiva), the chronological development of the idea over its history began with the questions on what is the true nature of human existence and whether people die only once. This led first to the concepts of Punarmṛtyu ("redeath") and Punaravṛtti ("return"). These early theories asserted that the nature of human existence involves two realities, one unchanging absolute Atman (Self) which is somehow connected to the ultimate unchanging immortal reality and bliss called Brahman, and that the rest is the always-changing subject (body) in a phenomenal world (maya). Redeath, in the Vedic theosophical speculations, reflected the end of "blissful years spent in svarga or heaven", and it was followed by rebirth back in the phenomenal world. Saṃsāra developed into a foundational theory of the nature of existence, shared by all Indian religions.

Rebirth as a human being, states John Bowker, was then presented as a "rare opportunity to break the sequence of rebirth, thus attaining Moksha, release". Each Indian spiritual tradition developed its own assumptions and paths (marga or yoga) for this spiritual release, with some developing the ideas of jivanmukti (liberation and freedom in this life), while the others content with videhamukti (liberation and freedom in after-life).

The First Truth

The first truth, suffering (Pali: dukkha; Sanskrit: duhkha),
is characteristic of existence in the realm of rebirth,
called samsara (literally “wandering”).

— Four Noble Truths, Donald Lopez

The Sramanas traditions (Buddhism and Jainism) added novel ideas, starting about the 6th century BC. They emphasized human suffering in the larger context, placing rebirth, redeath and truth of pain at the center and the start of religious life. Sramanas view saṃsāra as a beginningless cyclical process with each birth and death as punctuations in that process, and spiritual liberation as freedom from rebirth and redeath. The saṃsāric rebirth and redeath ideas are discussed in these religions with various terms, such as Āgatigati in many early Pali Suttas of Buddhism.

=== Evolution of ideas ===
Across different religions, different soteriology were emphasized as the saṃsāra theories evolved in respective Indian traditions. These traditions posited the way out of samsara through stopping action (Jainism, Ajivikas) or through realizing the true nature of existence (the Upanishads, Buddhism).

In their saṃsāra theories, the Hindu traditions accepted Ātman or Self exists and asserted it to be the unchanging essence of each living being, while Buddhist traditions denied such a soul exists and developed the concept of Anattā. Salvation (moksha, mukti) in the Hindu traditions was described using the concepts of Ātman (self) and Brahman (universal reality), while in Buddhism it (nirvāṇa, nibbāna) was described through the concept of Anattā (no self) and Śūnyatā (emptiness).

The Ajivika tradition combined saṃsāra with the premise that there is no free will, while the Jainism tradition accepted the concept of soul (calling it "jiva") with free will, but emphasized asceticism and cessation of action as a means of liberation from saṃsāra it calls bondage.

== By religion ==
=== Hinduism ===
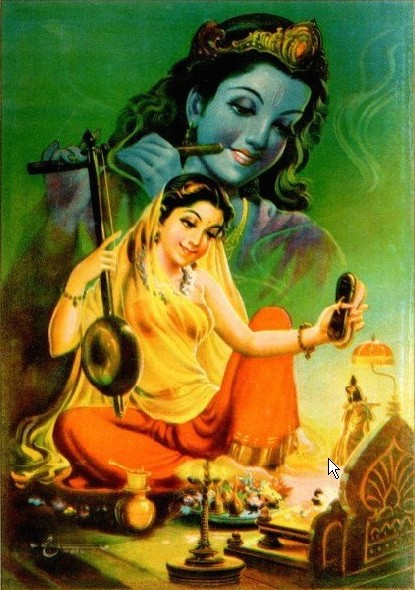
Loving devotion (Bhakti)

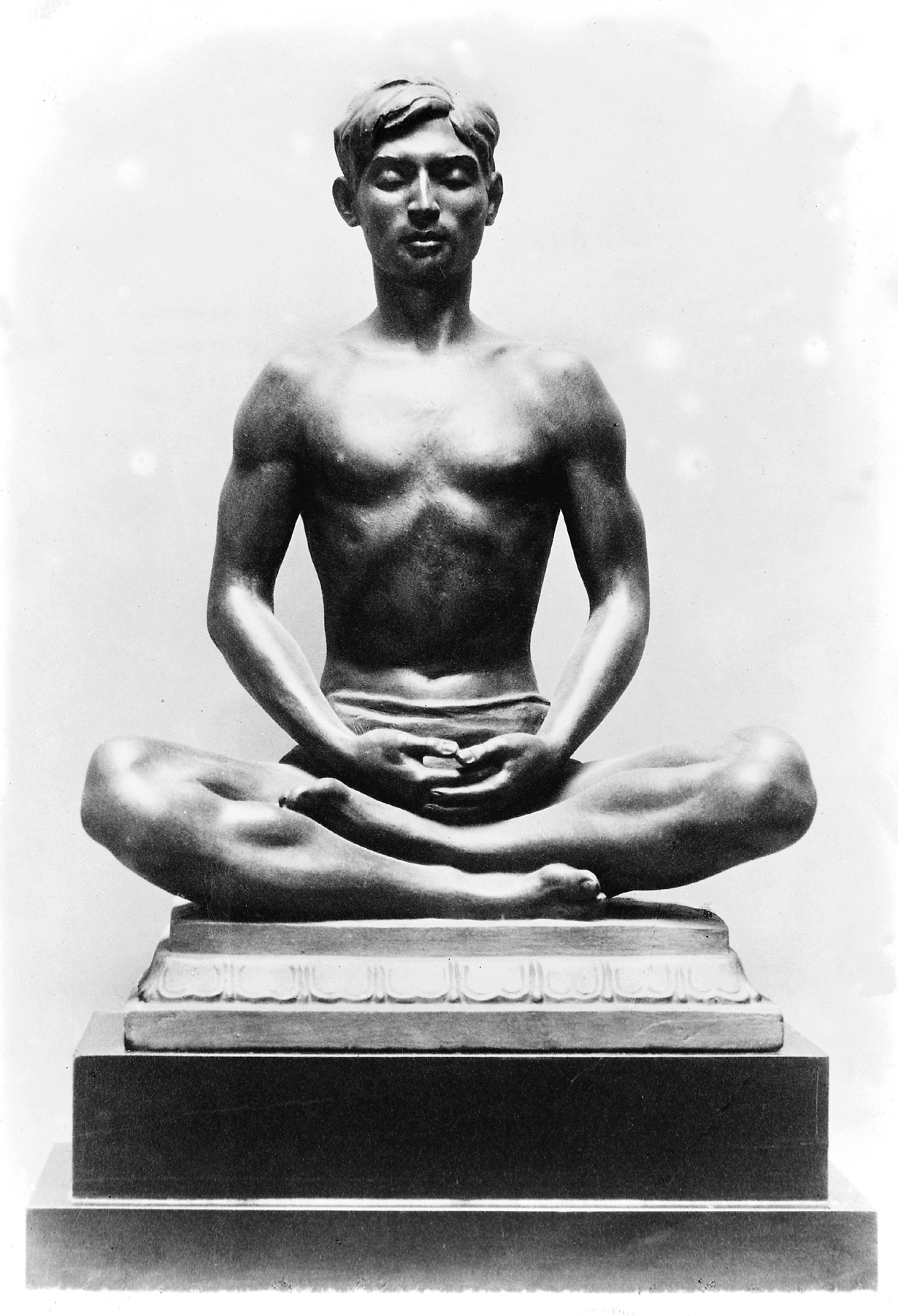
Meditation (Dhyāna)

Liberation/release from saṃsāra, called moksha, is considered the ultimate goal in Hinduism.

In Hinduism, saṃsāra is a journey of the Ātman. The body dies but not the Ātman, which is eternal reality, indestructible, and bliss. Everything and all existence is connected, cyclical, and composed of two things: the Self, or Ātman, and the body, or matter. This eternal Self called Ātman never reincarnates, it does not change and cannot change in the Hindu belief. In contrast, the body and personality, can change, constantly changes, is born and dies. Current karma impacts the future circumstances in this life, as well as the future forms and realms of lives. Good intent and actions lead to good future, bad intent and actions lead to bad future, in the Hindu view of life. The journey of samsara allows the atman the opportunity to perform positive or negative karmas throughout each birth and make spiritual efforts to attain moksha.

A virtuous life, actions consistent with dharma, are believed by Hindus to contribute to a better future, whether in this life or future lives. The aim of spiritual pursuits, whether it be through the path of bhakti (devotion), karma (work), jñāna (knowledge), or raja (meditation) is self-liberation (moksha) from saṃsāra.

The Upanishads, part of the scriptures of the Hindu traditions, primarily focus on self-liberation from saṃsāra. The Bhagavad Gita discusses various paths to liberation. The Upanishads, states Harold Coward, offer a "very optimistic view regarding the perfectibility of human nature", and the goal of human effort in these texts is a continuous journey to self-perfection and self-knowledge so as to end saṃsāra. The aim of spiritual quest in the Upanishadic traditions is to find the true self within and to know one's Self, a state that it believes leads to blissful state of freedom, moksha.

==== Differences within Hindu traditions ====
All Hindu traditions share the concept of saṃsāra, but they differ in details and what they describe the state of liberation from saṃsāra to be. The saṃsāra is viewed as the cycle of rebirth in a temporal world of always changing reality or Maya (appearance, illusive), Brahman is defined as that which never changes or Sat (eternal truth, reality), and moksha as the realization of Brahman and freedom from saṃsāra.

The dualistic devotional traditions such as Madhvacharya's Dvaita Vedanta tradition of Hinduism champion a theistic premise, assert the individual human Self and Brahman (Vishnu, Krishna) are two different realities, loving devotion to Vishnu is the means to release from saṃsāra, it is the grace of Vishnu which leads to moksha, and spiritual liberation is achievable only in after-life (videhamukti). The nondualistic traditions such as Adi Shankara's Advaita Vedanta tradition of Hinduism champion a monistic premise, asserting that the individual Atman and Brahman are identical, and only ignorance, impulsiveness and inertia leads to suffering through saṃsāra. In reality they are no dualities, meditation and self-knowledge is the path to liberation, the realization that one's Ātman is identical to Brahman is moksha, and spiritual liberation is achievable in this life (jivanmukti).

=== Jainism ===
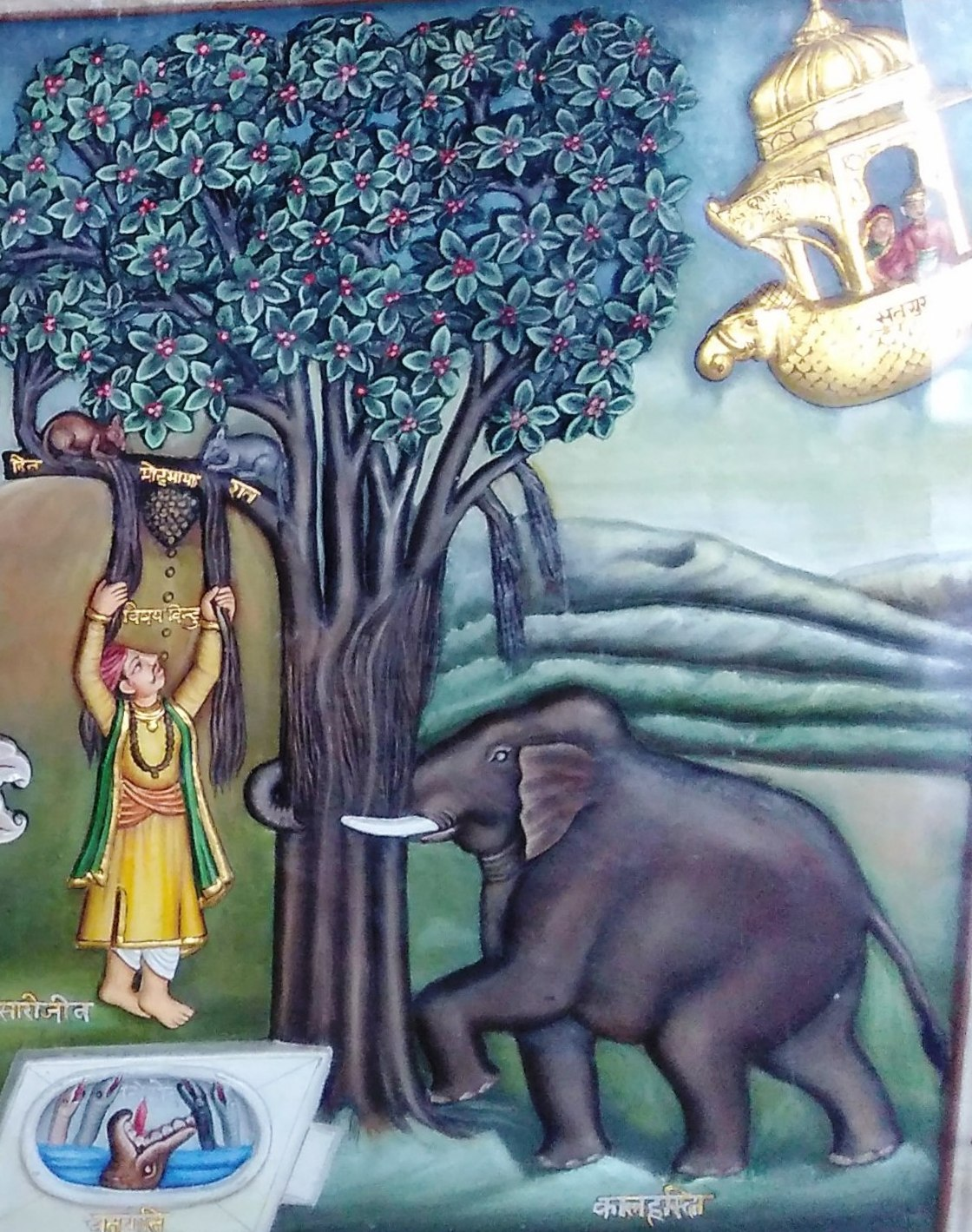
Symbolic depiction of saṃsāra at Shri Mahaveerji temple of Jainism.

In Jainism, the saṃsāra and karma doctrine are central to its theological foundations, as evidenced by the extensive literature on it in the major sects of Jainism, and their pioneering ideas on karma and saṃsāra from the earliest times of the Jaina tradition. Saṃsāra in Jainism represents the worldly life characterized by continuous rebirths and suffering in various realms of existence.

The conceptual framework of the saṃsāra doctrine differs between the Jainism traditions and other Indian religions. For instance, in Jaina traditions, soul (jiva) is accepted as a truth, as is assumed in the Hindu traditions, but not assumed in the Buddhist traditions. However, saṃsāra or the cycle of rebirths, has a definite beginning and end in Jainism.

Souls begin their journey in a primordial state, and exist in a state of consciousness continuum that is constantly evolving through saṃsāra. Some evolve to a higher state, while some regress, a movement that is driven by karma. Further, Jaina traditions believe that there exist Ābhāvya (incapable), or a class of souls that can never attain moksha (liberation). The Ābhāvya state of soul is entered after an intentional and shockingly evil act. Jainism considers souls as pluralistic each in a karma-saṃsāra cycle, and does not subscribe to Advaita style nondualism of Hinduism, or Advaya style nondualism of Buddhism.

The Jaina theosophy, like ancient Ajivika, but unlike Hindu and Buddhist theosophies, asserts that each soul passes through 8,400,000 birth-situations, as they circle through saṃsāra. As the soul cycles, states Padmanabh Jaini, Jainism traditions believe that it goes through five types of bodies: earth bodies, water bodies, fire bodies, air bodies and vegetable lives. With all human and non-human activities, such as rainfall, agriculture, eating and even breathing, minuscule living beings are taking birth or dying, their souls are believed to be constantly changing bodies. Perturbing, harming or killing any life form, including any human being, is considered a sin in Jainism, with negative karmic effects.

A liberated soul in Jainism is one who has gone beyond saṃsāra, is at the apex, is omniscient, remains there eternally, and is known as a Siddha. A male human being is considered closest to the apex with the potential to achieve liberation, particularly through asceticism. Women must gain karmic merit, to be reborn as man, and only then can they achieve spiritual liberation in Jainism, particularly in the Digambara sect of Jainism; however, this view has been historically debated within Jainism and different Jaina sects have expressed different views, particularly the Shvetambara sect that believes that women too can achieve liberation from saṃsāra.

In contrast to Buddhist texts which do not expressly or unambiguously condemn injuring or killing plants and minor life forms, Jaina texts do. Jainism considers it a bad karma to injure plants and minor life forms with negative impact on a soul's saṃsāra. However, some texts in Buddhism and Hinduism do caution a person from injuring all life forms, including plants and seeds.

=== Buddhism ===
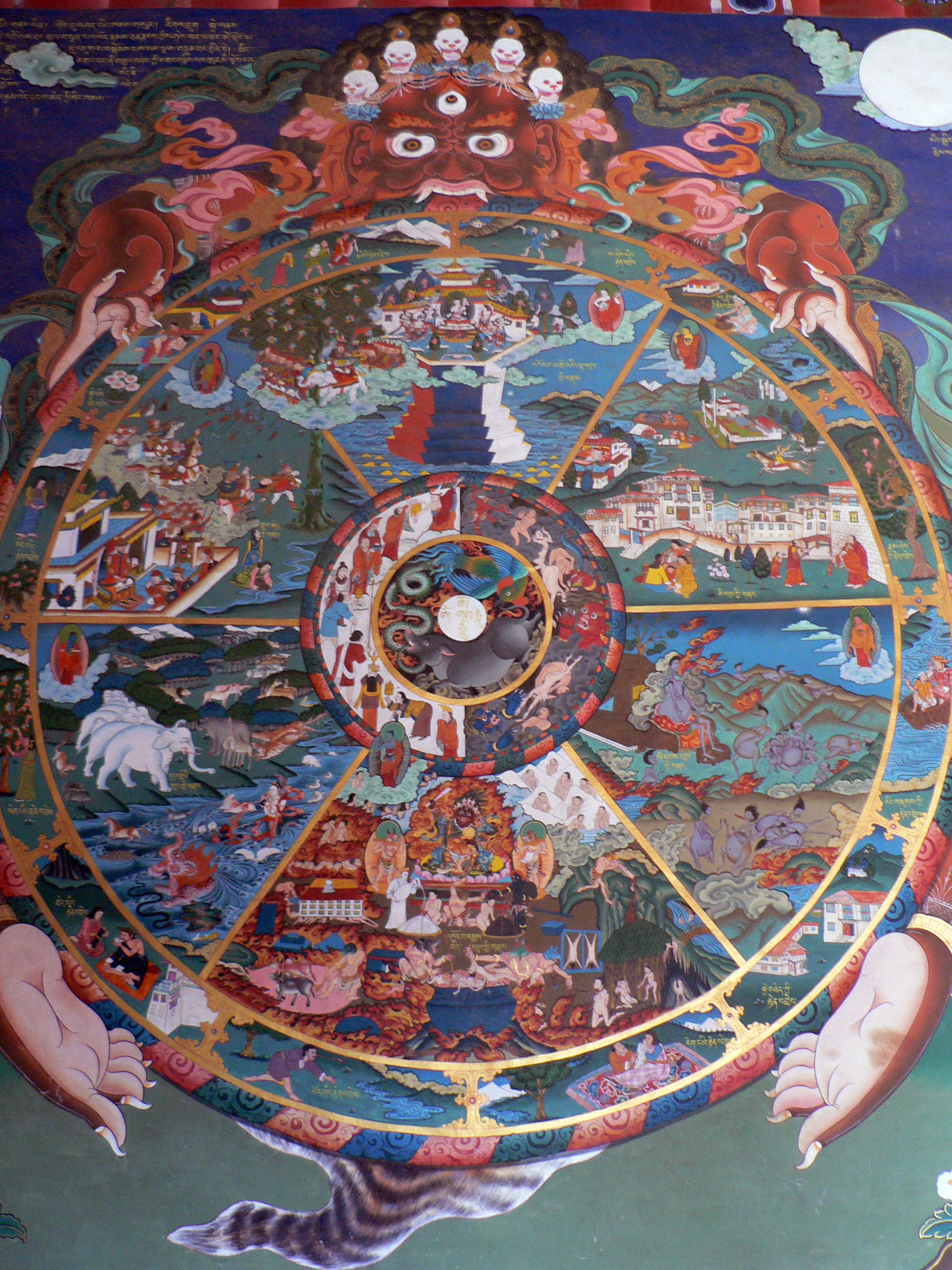
Traditional Tibetan thangka showing the bhavacakra and six realms of saṃsāra in Buddhist cosmology.

Saṃsāra in Buddhism, states Jeff Wilson, is the "suffering-laden cycle of life, death, and rebirth, without beginning or end". Also referred to as the wheel of existence (Bhavacakra), it is often mentioned in Buddhist texts with the term punarbhava (rebirth, re-becoming); the liberation from this cycle of existence, Nirvāṇa, is the foundation and the most important purpose of Buddhism.

Saṃsāra is considered permanent in Buddhism, just like other Indian religions. Karma drives this permanent saṃsāra in Buddhist thought, states Paul Williams, and "short of attaining enlightenment, in each rebirth one is born and dies, to be reborn elsewhere in accordance with the completely impersonal causal nature of one's own karma; This endless cycle of birth, rebirth, and redeath is saṃsāra". The Four Noble Truths, accepted by all Buddhist traditions, are aimed at ending this saṃsāra-related re-becoming (rebirth) and associated cycles of suffering.

Like Jainism, Buddhism developed its own saṃsāra theory, that evolved over time the mechanistic details on how the wheel of mundane existence works over the endless cycles of rebirth and redeath. In early Buddhist traditions, saṃsāra cosmology consisted of five realms through which wheel of existence recycled. This included hells (niraya), hungry ghosts (pretas), animals (tiryak), humans (manushya), and gods (devas, heavenly). In latter traditions, this list grew to a list of six realms of rebirth, adding demi-gods (asuras), which were included in gods realm in earlier traditions. The "hungry ghost, heavenly, hellish realms" respectively formulate the ritual, literary and moral spheres of many contemporary Buddhist traditions.

The saṃsāra concept, in Buddhism, envisions that these six realms are interconnected, and everyone cycles life after life, and death is just a state for an afterlife, through these realms, because of a combination of ignorance, desires and purposeful karma, or ethical and unethical actions. Nirvāṇa is typically described as the freedom from rebirth and the only alternative to suffering of saṃsāra, in Buddhism. However, the Buddhist texts developed a more comprehensive theory of rebirth, states Steven Collins, from fears of redeath, called amata (death-free), a state which is considered synonymous with Nirvāṇa.

=== Sikhism ===
Sikhism incorporates the concepts of saṃsāra (sometimes spelled as Saṅsāra in Sikh texts), karma and cyclical nature of time and existence. Founded in the 15th century, its founder Guru Nanak incorporated the cyclical concept of ancient Indian religions and the cyclical concept of time, state Cole and Sambhi. However, states Arvind-Pal Singh Mandair, there are important differences between the Saṅsāra concept in Sikhism from the saṃsāra concept in many traditions within Hinduism. The difference is that Sikhism firmly believes in the grace of God as the means to salvation, and its precepts encourage the bhakti of One Lord for mukti (salvation).

Sikhism, like the three ancient Indian traditions, believes that body is perishable, that there is a cycle of rebirth, and that there is suffering with each cycle of rebirth. These features of Sikhism, along with its belief in Saṅsāra and the grace of God, are similar to some bhakti-oriented sub-traditions within Hinduism such as those found in Vaishnavism. Sikhism does not believe that ascetic life, as recommended in Jainism, is the path to liberation. Rather, it cherishes social engagement and householder's life combined with devotion to the One God as Guru, to be the path of liberation from saṅsāra.

== See also ==
- Rebirth (Buddhism)
- Rota Fortunae
- Resurrection
