= Flowerdew =

Flowerdew is a surname and given name. Notable people with the name include:

== Surname ==
- A. Flowerdew (1759–1830), English teacher, religious poet and hymnist
- Arthur Flowerdew (1906–2002), British engineer
- Bob Flowerdew, British organic gardener and television presenter
- Edward Flowerdew (d. 1586), English politician and judge
- Gordon Flowerdew (1885–1918), Canadian cavalry officer and recipient of the Victoria Cross
- Temperance Flowerdew (1590–1628), early settler of the Jamestown Colony of Virginia

== Given name ==
- Flowerdew Macindoe (1865–1932), Scottish rugby union player

== See also ==
- Flowerdew Hundred Plantation, in the United States
