= Predestination (disambiguation) =

Predestination is the Christian doctrine that all events have been willed by God, usually with reference to the eventual fate of the individual soul (see predestination in Catholicism and predestination in Calvinism).

Predestination may also refer to:

- Predestination in Islam
- Predestination (film), a 2014 Australian film

== See also ==
- Foreordination, a doctrine of Mormonism
