= Punarjanman =

Rebirth in Indian religions

Punarjanman (Sanskrit: पुनर्जन्मन्) in Hinduism refers to "repeated birth", "transmigration", "re-birth" or "a principle of diachronic ontogeny". The ultimate goal of Indian religions, such as Hinduism, Buddhism, Jainism, Sikhism has been the attainment of moksha or nirvana, and consequently the termination of punarjanman or 'rebirth'.

== Punarjanman in Hinduism ==
=== In the Vedas ===
Although punarjanman does not appear in the Vedas, punarmṛtyu, or re-death, is theorized in them which may suggest that concepts around death predetermined theories of birth. Preventing the suffering of repeated death also means preventing rebirth. References to amrtatva in the Rg Veda, meaning long life on earth rather than immortality, also indicate the idea of re-death is very old, even if the term punarmṛtyu appears later.

=== In the Upanishads and Bhagavad Gita ===
Sage Yajnavalkya is the first recorded speaker of transmigration. Describing the self that undergoes punarjanman, the Brihadaranyaka Upanishad delineates that the ātman is the consciousness that controls a person's vital functions. It uses analogies such as a caterpillar moving from one blade of grass to another, or gold being moulded into different forms, to illustrate that the atman moves to different bodies. According to the Upanishads, even devas are subject to re-death.

In the Bhagavad Gita, Krishna describes the soul as indestructible, unalterable, and timeless, unaffected by physical harm or elemental forces. He analogizes the process of punarjanman in verse 2.22: "Just as a man, having thrown away his worn-out clothes, takes on new ones, so does the jīva, having abandoned worn-out bodies, connect with other new ones." The Bhagavad Gita and Upanishads explains the process and reasoning behind the soul's transition to new bodies, linking it to the concepts of sanskaras (impressions from past actions) and karma.

The concept of punarjanman or rebirth is a foundational belief in Hinduism, emphasizing the soul's eternal and undying nature alongside the importance of karma (actions). Portraying life and death as part of an ongoing cycle until one attains moksha (liberation), which contrasts with other religions that focus on a single life. Death is a transition where the eternal soul seamlessly moves from one body to another. The body is temporary and perishable, and the soul merely adopts new forms over time.

Punarjanman results from karma; the effect of performed actions from previous births play out in the present birth. According to the Brahma Purana, the jiva, while an embryo, remembers previous lives and repents. It determines to make better use of its coming life, but at each birth, the jiva forgets its previous lives, and with that its resolution.

=== Sankhya, Yoga, and Purva-Mimamsa ===
Of the six orthodox Hindu schools of thought, the Sankhya and Purva-Mimamsa schools, like the rest, accept transmigration, and that it embodies justice. Unlike the other schools, however, Sankhya and Purva-Mimamsa do not believe that a higher entity is required to govern the process of transmigration and the allocation of the fruits of karma.

According to the Sankhya school, the coarse material body, which is visible, of the soul decays after death. The subtle material body follows the soul throughout rebirths.

Both Sankhya and Yoga accept that samskaras and vasanas follow the self through rebirths. These are residues from previously performed action. Yoga is a way to prevent future actions from producing samskaras. Once all previous actions have had their effects, one attains liberation.

=== Vishishtadvaita ===
Ramanuja does not take the end of punarjanman alone to be moksha. Moksha is the joy from contemplating on God.

=== In the Charvaka school ===
The Charvaka school of thought asserts that we have only one life, rejecting the idea of an afterlife or reincarnation, which many other Indian philosophical schools accept. Charvaka school promote a "live for the moment" attitude, believing that enjoying the present is better than hoping for future rewards. This approach is often seen as a form of hedonism, emphasizing the pursuit of pleasure (kama) as the main goal in life and rejecting conventional moral ideas of right and wrong.
