= Arthur Flowerdew =

British man claimed as proof of reincarnation

- Born: James Arthur Flowerdew; 1 December 1906; Great Yarmouth, Norfolk
- Died: 30 September 2002 (aged 95); Gorleston-on-Sea, Norfolk

James Arthur Flowerdew (1 December 1906 – 30 September 2002) was an English man from Norfolk, England whose claimed recollections of the ancient city of Petra in Jordan are offered as a supposed proof of the existence of reincarnation.

== Life ==
Arthur Flowerdew was born on 1 December 1906. From his adolescence, Flowerdew experienced strange visions of a stone city carved into a cliff, which were particularly strong when he played in the multicolored pebbles on a beach near his home. The clarity of his visions grew as he did.

One day, as an adult, he watched a BBC documentary on the ancient city of Petra in Jordan and immediately recognized it as the city of his visions. He became convinced that he had lived a previous life in Petra and contacted the BBC. They filmed and broadcast a short piece on Flowerdew, which the Jordanian government saw and was intrigued by. They offered to fly Flowerdew out to Petra to examine its remains and perhaps offer insights on analyzing the city.

In The Tibetan Book of Living and Dying, Rinpoche claims that before Flowerdew left for Jordan, he was interviewed by an archaeological expert excavating Petra to test his knowledge of the ancient city. He also claims Flowerdew described the city with astounding accuracy and pointed out three landmarks prominent in his memory, as well as going directly to these landmarks upon his arrival at Petra (including his purported place of murder), explained a very plausible use for a device whose explanation had baffled archaeologists, and even correctly identified the locations of many landmarks that had yet to be excavated. Many experts said that Flowerdew had more knowledge of the city than many professionals studying it, and they did not believe him to be an incredible con man (a feat which, in this case, they felt would have taken extraordinary skill). The archeological expert on Petra who accompanied Flowerdew to Jordan said,

He's filled in details and a lot of it is very consistent with known archeological and historical facts and it would require a mind very different from his to be able to sustain a fabric of deception on the scale of his memories—at least those he's reported to me. I don't think he's a fraud. I don't think he has the capacity to be a fraud on this scale.

According to Sogyal Rinpoche's story, Flowerdew maintained he had never seen or heard of Petra before the BBC documentary and had never read any literature on the city.

Many spiritual leaders, including Tibetan Buddhist lama Sogyal Rinpoche, believe that Flowerdew's experience offers highly suggestive evidence for the existence of rebirth or reincarnation.

Mircea Eliade may have used Flowerdew's experience as the basis of his 1976 novel "Youth without Youth", which was adapted into a film in 2007 by Francis Ford Coppola.

He died at James Paget University Hospital in Gorleston-on-Sea, Norfolk.
