= Predestination in Catholicism =

Aspect of Catholic theology

Predestination in Catholicism is the Catholic Church's teachings on predestination and Catholic saints' views on it. The church believes that predestination is not based on anything external to God - for example, the grace of baptism is not merited but given freely to those who receive baptism - since predestination was formulated before the foundation of the world. Predestination to eternal life, deification, divine filiation, and heaven encompasses all of mankind, for God has assumed man to his divinity by becoming man. Since man is a microcosm of creation, all of creation shares in man's predestination: it belongs to everyone, it is destined for renewal on Judgment Day, and it is being guided to its destiny by Divine Providence.

== Official teaching ==
=== Nature of predestination ===
"Predestination" is God's plan to give each person eternal life through divine filiation in Jesus through the Holy Spirit; in other words. The whole Trinity formulated this plan from eternity. Predestination unfolds through the creation of the world, sacred history, the life of Jesus Christ, his sacrifice on the Cross, the work of the Holy Spirit, and through the Catholic Church and its Sacraments. Because God is love, he predestines out of love and predestination is a grace. The two most prominent explanations of the Catholic concept of predestination are termed Molinism and Thomism; both fall within the scope of Catholic orthodoxy.

=== Predestination and divine providence ===
The purpose of life is deification and eternal life. As such, Divine Providence leads each person to his or her destiny. This destiny will be fully realized at the universal resurrection when one will get back one's own body - only glorified like Jesus' resurrected body.

=== Predestination and free will ===
Because God is omniscient, predestination takes into account each person's response to his grace (whether to accept it by virtue or reject it by sin). For the sake of accomplishing predestination, God permits sin. Examples of this include God permitting original sin in light of Jesus redeeming man, and Jesus being rejected by his people Israel in order to fulfill the prophecy of the Servant Songs. However it is important to recognise that that is the view of Molinism, which is held by majority of the Church fathers before Augustine, especially in the east, but got articulated more precisely by Molina. The view of Thomism which gained dominance in the Middle Ages and is promoted by Pope Leo XIII in Aeterni Patris is that when God physically premoves the will to a certain good the will still remains free despite being certainly moved as efficacious grace is, in the divided sense resistible meaning if God had willed things to be different it could have been resisted but it never will be resisted as it is in the composite sense irresistible. The Thomistic school would interpret CCC 600 in this way while still maintaining physical premotion as the thomistic school can be called followers of Compatibilism which teaches that while everything is determined the will is still free, as freedom isn’t merely the ability to do what you want but the ability to do good. The thomistic school also teaches that God permits sin for a greater good and to manifest his Justice. The permission of sin is called “Negative antecedent reprobation” and happens before the damnation to hell which is called “positive consequent reprobation”, the molinists also believe in “positive consequent reprobation” but deny negative antecedent reprobation as they deny that it is required for man to sin.

=== Predestination and death ===
Because God is omniscient, predestination takes into account the fact that man would become mortal due to sin, and includes, not only the limited amount of time that each person has to fulfill his or her life by receiving divine filiation, but also every grace that God gives to each person.

=== Predestination and worship ===
Each person is predestined to take part in God the Son's divine relationship to God the Father, because - though one is not a god - one becomes like God by divine filiation through baptism. By divine filiation, one has the right to worship God, even to call him one's own Father just like Jesus did.

=== Predestination and prayer ===
As God wills each person to go to Heaven, the petition "Your will be done on Earth as it is in Heaven" in the Our Father means one is praying for predestination to be fully realized on Earth just as it is already fully realized in Heaven, e.g., in the saints that live forever in Heaven.

=== Predestination is not eternal security ===
No one can know for certain—except by special revelation—who will be saved or not saved, as the Council of Trent condemned belief in eternal security. For example, neither the Bible nor the church teaches that Judas Iscariot can be known with certainty to be in hell.

=== Predestination is not equal ultimacy ===
No one is predestined to evil but the damned are predestined to damnation on account of sin. Man was not created or predestined to die, as his death - unlike other organisms - was a consequence of sin. That being said, the school of Thomism would say that while nobody is predestined to evil, as per the malice of sin, since man can do nothing without God, man is moved to the act of sin, but only in so far as it is an act, it is blasphemy to say God moves men to the malice of sin.

=== Predestination and sacraments ===
The decree "On the Sacraments in general" (in Latin: De sacramentis in genere), approved during the Seventh Session of the Council of Trent on 3 March 1547, teaches that all baptized Christians can be saved through the sacramental grace (Canon 7 of 13):

CANON VII.-If any one saith, that grace, as far as God’s part is concerned, is not given through the said sacraments, always, and to all men, even though they receive them rightly, but (only) sometimes, and to some persons; let him be anathema.

== Examples of predestination ==
Besides the aforesaid broad understanding of predestination, the church believes in specific examples of predestination. Some of these include: the universal destination of goods, the new Heaven and new Earth coming to be on Judgment Day, Divine Providence leading creation toward the new Heaven and new Earth, the election of Israel as God's chosen people, the Virgin Mary being the mother of Jesus, Jesus fulfilling the Scriptures, and the permanence of apostolic succession.
