= Near-death studies =

Field of psychology

Near-death studies is a field of research that studies the near-death experience (NDE). The field was originally associated with a distinct group of North American researchers that followed up on the initial work of Raymond Moody, and who later established the International Association for Near-Death Studies (IANDS) and the Journal of Near-Death Studies. Since then the field has expanded, and now includes contributions from a wide range of researchers and commentators worldwide. Research on near-death experiences is mainly limited to the disciplines of medicine, psychology, and psychiatry.

== Research – history and background ==
=== Precursors ===
According to Janice Holden, Bruce Greyson and Debbie James in the Handbook of Near-Death Experiences, the term near-death experience was coined by Raymond Moody in his 1975 book Life After Life. Moody noted that mentions of the near-death experience can be located in ancient texts, such as Plato's Dialogues, the Egyptian Book of the Dead and the Tibetan Book of the Dead. During the 1880s and 1890s, near-death phenomena were part of the investigation of paranormal phenomena. Precursors to the field of near-death studies include the work of paranormal investigators, such as William Crookes and Frederick W.H. Myers, and the work of parapsychological societies, such as the Society for Psychical Research (SPR) in England, and its American counterpart. The work attracted skepticism from contemporary branches of science. Also in the 1800s, two efforts moved beyond studying individual cases—one privately done by Mormons and one in Switzerland. According to Russell Noyes and Donald J. Slymen in 1972, the first academic note on a near-death experience was reported by Albert von St. Gallen Heim in 1892.

The early 1900s was a period of disinterest in the topic, only marked by occasional contributions, including the commentaries of Gardner Murphy and the research of Donald West. In 1948, West investigated the occurrence of psi-phenomena in a small sample of the British population. He found that "14 percent of his sample had undergone a hallucinatory experience and 9 percent had reported seeing apparitions of the dead". During the 1970s, the work of Elisabeth Kübler-Ross attracted attention and she addressed the topic publicly. Interest in the topic was also spurred by autobiographical accounts, such as the books of George G. Ritchie.

=== Formative period – early profiles ===
Commentators note that the launch of the field of near-death studies started with work of Raymond Moody. Moody got interested in the subject of near-death experiences at the start of his career. In the mid-1970s, while doing his medical residency as a psychiatrist at the University of Virginia, he conducted interviews with near-death experiencers. He later published these findings in the book Life After Life (1976). In the book Moody outlines the different elements of the NDE. These features were picked up by later researchers, and the book brought public attention to the topic of NDEs. Early contributions to the field of near-death studies also include the work of Russell Noyes, who collected NDE stories from personal accounts and medical records. According to commentators, his work signalled the first big shift in perspective within the field, pulling the methodology away from parapsychology and towards the principles of medicine. In the 1970s,Noyes and Kletti reported on the phenomenon of depersonalization related to life-threatening danger. According to literature, Noyes and Kletti's 1977-article, "Depersonalization in Response to Life-threatening Danger", is the most cited article in the field of Near-death studies as of 2011.

In 1977, a group researchers met in Charlottesville, Virginia, in order to prepare further investigations of the NDE-phenomenon. The late 1970s saw the establishment of the Association for the Scientific Study of Near-Death Phenomena (ASSNDP), an initial group of academic researchers, including John Audette, Raymond Moody, Bruce Greyson, Kenneth Ring, and Michael Sabom, who laid the foundations for the field of near-death studies, and carried out some of the first NDE research in the wake of Moody's work. The ASSNDP was a forerunner to the International Association for Near-death Studies (IANDS), which was founded in the early 1980s and which established its headquarters at the University of Connecticut, Storrs. One of the first publications associated with this group of researchers was a treatment of several NDE case-reports originally collected by Fred Schoonmaker. The treatment was carried out and published by John Audette in 1979. This group of researchers, but especially Ring, was responsible for launching Anabiosis, the first peer-reviewed journal within the field. The journal later became Journal of Near-Death Studies.

Even though NDEs were introduced to the academic setting, the subject was often met with academic disbelief, or regarded as taboo. The medical community has been reluctant to address the phenomenon of NDEs, and funding for research has been limited; however, both Ring and Sabom made contributions that were influential for the newly established field. Ring published a book in 1980 called Life at Death: A Scientific Investigation of the Near-Death Experience. In the book Ring identified the core near-death experience, with its corresponding stages. This early research was followed in 1984 by Ring's book Heading Toward Omega: In Search of the Meaning of the Near-Death Experience, where he described the mystical and transcendent features of the NDE, and the futuristic visions described by near-death experiencers. The early work of Michael Sabom also brought attention within the academic community. Besides contributing material to academic journals, he wrote a book called Recollections of Death (1982), which is considered to be a significant publication in the launching of the field.

Some of the early retrospective work was being carried out by Greyson and Stevenson who published their findings in the American Journal of Psychiatry in 1980. The authors used questionnaires, interviews, and medical records in order to study the phenomenology of NDEs and suggested that social and psychological factors explained some, but not all, components of the NDE. Greyson has also addressed different aspects of the NDE, such as the psychodynamics of the experience, the typology of NDEs, the varieties of NDEs, and the biology of NDEs. In addition, he brought attention to the NDE as a focus of clinical attention, suggesting that the aftermath of the NDE, in some cases, can lead to psychological problems. As research in the field progressed, both Greyson and Ring developed measurement tools that can be used in a clinical setting. According to Kinsella, no other researcher, besides Moody, has done more to "influence public opinion on the subject of NDEs" than Ring.

The 1980s also introduced the research of Melvin Morse, who profiled near-death studies. Morse and colleagues investigated NDEs in a pediatric population. They found that children reported NDEs that were similar to those described by adults. Morse later published two books, co-authored with Paul Perry, that were aimed at a general audience: Closer to the Light: Learning from Children's Near-Death Experiences (1990), followed by Transformed by The Light: The Powerful Effect of Near-Death Experiences on People's Lives (1992). British neuropsychiatrist Peter Fenwick started to collect NDE stories in the 1980s, following their appearances in television programs. The responses from near-death experiencers later served as the basis for his book published in 1997, The Truth in the light, co-authored with his wife Elizabeth Fenwick. In the book, the authors investigated more than 300 NDEs and concluded that the "subjective experience" is the key to understanding the phenomenon of NDEs.

Co-operating with other researchers, such as Sam Parnia, Fenwick has reviewed, as well as researched, the potential relationship between near-death experiences and cardiac arrest. Early investigations into the topic of near-death experiences were also conducted at the University of Virginia, where Ian Stevenson founded the Division of Perceptual Studies in the late 1960s. The division went on to produce research on a number of phenomena that were not considered to be mainstream. In addition to near-death experiences this included: reincarnation and past lives, out-of-body experiences, apparitions and after-death communications, and deathbed visions. Stevenson, whose main academic interest was the topic of reincarnation and past lives, also made contributions to the field of near-death studies. In a 1990 study, co-authored with Owens and Cook, the researchers studied the medical records of 58 people who were thought to have been near death. The authors judged 28 candidates to actually have been close to dying, while 30 candidates, who merely thought they were about to die, were judged to not have been in any medical danger. Both groups reported similar experiences, but the first group reported more features of the core NDE than the other group. According to Loseu and colleagues, who published an analysis of the published literature in the field of near-death studies, there was a peak in the output of articles in the 15-year period between 1980 and 1995, followed by a decreasing trend.

=== Later period – new profiles, prospective studies ===
The first decades of near-death research were characterized by retrospective studies. From 1975 to 2005, some 2500 self reported individuals in the US had been reviewed in retrospective studies of the phenomena, with an additional 600 outside the US in the West, and 70 in Asia; however, the late 1980s marked the beginning of prospective studies in the field. Prospective studies (which are more expensive) review groups of individuals and find who had an NDE. They had identified 270 individuals by 2005. Kovoor and colleagues performed a scoping review of research on NDE's in Cardiac Arrest situations. They identified a total of 60 prospective studies, 11 of which were included in their review (Table 1).

Pim van Lommel (a cardiologist) was one of the first researchers to bring the study of NDEs into the area of Hospital Medicine. In 1988 he launched a prospective study that spanned 10 Dutch hospitals. 344 survivors of cardiac arrest were included in the study. 62 patients (18%) reported NDE. 41 of these patients (12%) described a core experience. The aim of the study was to investigate the cause of the experience, and assess variables connected to frequency, depth, and content. Prospective studies were also taking place in the U.S. Schwaninger and colleagues collaborated with Barnes-Jewish Hospital, where they studied cardiac arrest patients over a three-year period (April 1991 – February 1994). Only a minority of the patients survived, and from this group 30 patients were interviewable. Of these 30 patients 23% reported an NDE, while 13% reported an NDE during "a prior life-threatening illness".

In a prospective study from 2001, conducted at Southampton General Hospital, Parnia and colleagues found that 11.1% of 63 cardiac-arrest survivors reported memories of their unconscious period. Several of these memories included NDE features.^{Note c} Greyson conducted a 30-month survey of patients admitted to the cardiac inpatient service of the University of Virginia Hospital. He found that NDEs were reported by 10% of patients with cardiac arrest and 1% of other cardiac patients. Up to 2005, 95% of world cultures have been documented making some mention of NDEs. In all, close to 3500 individual cases between 1975 and 2005 had been reviewed by some 55 researchers or teams of researchers.

During the next decade, prospective studies were starting to emerge from other parts of the world. In a study from 2010 Klemenc-Ketis and colleagues reported on out-of-hospital cardiac arrest survivors, later admitted to intensive care units, at medical centers in Slovenia. 21.2% of the patients in the study reported NDEs. The researchers also found that "NDE occur more often in patients with higher petCO2 and pCO2"; "higher serum levels of potassium correlate with higher score on Greyson's NDE scale"; and "NDEs occur more often in patients with previous NDEs".

Based on the results from an analysis of scholarly NDE-related periodical literature, the decade between 2001 and 2011 signaled an expansion of the field of near-death studies by including new authors and new publication venues. Research has also entered into other fields of interest, such as the mental health of military veterans. Goza, Holden, and Kinsey studied NDEs among combat veterans. They found, among other things, that combat soldiers reported "less intense" near-death experiences, compared to NDErs in the civilian population. The work of Goza and others is now known as Combat-related NDEs.

The first clinical paper from The AWARE-project (AWAreness during REsuscitation), another prospective study, was published in 2014. The research was a multicenter observational study including US, UK and Austrian medical sites. In the study, Parnia and colleagues found that 9% of patients who completed stage 2 interviews reported experiences compatible with NDEs. A follow-up study, AWARE II, was completed in November 2022, and was published in 2023. The study reported that 28 participants completed interviews, with 11 reporting experiences suggestive of consciousness during cardiac arrest. As of 2011, Greyson has the greatest output of material and remains the leading scholar in the field of near-death studies. Other researchers with a large output of material includes P. M. H. Atwater and neuropsychiatrist Peter Fenwick.

== Explanatory models ==
Explanatory models for the phenomenology and the elements of the NDE can be divided into three broad categories: psychological, physiological, and transcendental. In a study published in 1990, Owens, Cook and Stevenson presented results that took all three interpretations into consideration. Christian Agrillo notes that literature reports two main theoretical frameworks: (1) "biological/psychological" (in-brain theories), or (2) "survivalist" (out-of-brain theories). Several researchers in the field have expressed reservations towards explanations that are purely psychological or physiological. Van Lommel and colleagues have argued for the inclusion of transcendental categories as part of the explanatory framework. Other researchers, such as Parnia, Fenwick, and Greyson, have argued for an expanded discussion about the mind-brain relationship as well as the possibilities of human consciousness.

== Psychometrics ==
Several psychometric instruments have been adapted to near-death research. Early contributions included the instruments developed by Ring and Greyson In 1980, Ring developed the Weighted Core Experience Index in order to measure the depth of NDEs, and this index has been used by other researchers for this purpose. The index has also been used to measure the impact of near-death experiences on dialysis patients. According to some commentators, the index has improved the consistency in the field; however, Greyson notes that although the index is a "pioneering effort", it is not based on statistical analysis, and has not been tested for internal coherence or reliability. In 1984, Ring developed an instrument called the Life Changes Inventory (LCI) in order to quantify value changes following an NDE. The instrument was later revised and standardized and a new version, the LCI-R, was published in 2004.

In 1983, Greyson developed The Near-Death Experience Scale. This 16-item scale was found to have high internal consistency, split-half reliability, and test-retest reliability, and was correlated with Ring's Weighted Core Experience Index. Questions formulated by the scale address such dimensions as: cognition (feelings of accelerated thought, or "life-review"), affect (feelings of peace and joy), paranormal experience (feelings of being outside of the body, or a perception of future events) and transcendence (experience of encountering deceased relatives, or experiencing an unearthly realm). A score of 7 or higher out of a possible 32 was used as the standard criterion for a near-death experience. The scale is, according to the author, clinically useful in differentiating NDEs from organic brain syndromes and nonspecific stress responses. The NDE-scale was later found to fit the Rasch rating scale model. The instrument has been used to measure NDEs among cardiac arrest survivors, coma survivors, out-of-hospital cardiac arrest patients/survivors, substance misusers, and dialysis patients.

In the late 1980s, Thornburg developed the Near-Death Phenomena Knowledge and Attitudes Questionnaire. The questionnaire consists of 23 true/false/undecided response items assessing knowledge, 23 Likert scale items assessing general attitudes toward near-death phenomena, and 20 Likert scale items assessing attitude toward caring for a client who has had an NDE. Content validity was established by using a panel of experts selected from nursing, sociology, and psychology. The instrument was also found to satisfy the criteria for internal consistency. The instrument has been used to measure attitudes toward, and knowledge of, near-death experiences in a college population, among clergy, registered psychologists, and hospice nurses.

Martial and colleagues developed the Near-Death Experience Content (NDE-C) scale, a 20-item scale constructed in order to reassess the Greyson NDE-scale and to validate the new NDE-C scale. The authors found weaknesses in the original NDE-scale, but good psychometric properties for the new NDE-C scale. Greyson has also used mainstream psychological measurements in his research, for example: The Dissociative Experiences Scale, a measure of dissociative symptoms; and The Threat Index, a measure of the threat implied by one's personal death.

== Near death studies community ==
=== Research organizations and academic locations ===
The field of near-death studies includes several communities that study the phenomenology of NDEs. One of the most influential is IANDS, an international organization based in Durham, North Carolina, US, that promotes research and education on the phenomenon of near-death experiences. Among its publications is the peer-reviewed Journal of Near-Death Studies. Another research organization, the Louisiana-based Near Death Experience Research Foundation, was established by radiation oncologist Jeffrey Long in 1998. The foundation established a website that same year. A few universities have been associated with near-death studies: the University of Connecticut (US), Southampton University (UK), University of North Texas (US), and the Division of Perceptual Studies at the University of Virginia (US).

=== Conferences ===
IANDS holds conferences on the topic of near-death experiences. In 2006 the University of Texas MD Anderson Cancer Center became the first medical institution to host the annual IANDS conference. The first international medical conference on near-death experiences was held in 2006. Approximately 1,500 delegates, including people who claim to have had NDEs, attended the one-day conference in Martigues, France. Among the researchers at the conference were Moody and anesthetist and intensive care doctor Jean-Jacques Charbonnier.

=== Relevant publications ===
IANDS publishes the quarterly Journal of Near-Death Studies, the only scholarly journal in the field. One of the first introductions to the field of near-death studies was A Collection of Near-Death Research Readings: Scientific Inquiries Into the Experiences of Persons Near Physical Death, edited by Craig R. Lundahl and released in 1982. An early general reader was The Near-Death Experience: Problems, Prospects, Perspectives, published in 1984. In 2009, the Handbook of Near-Death Experiences: thirty years of investigation was published. It was an overview of the field based on papers presented at the IANDS conference in 2006. Making Sense of Near-Death Experiences: A Handbook for Clinicians was published in 2011. The book had many contributors and described how the NDE could be handled in psychiatric and clinical practice. In 2017 the University of Missouri Press published The Science Of Near-death Experiences, a compilation of articles that were originally published in the medical journal Missouri Medicine between 2013 and 2015.

== Recognition and criticism ==
According to literature, the field of near-death studies is associated with discovery, challenges, and controversy. Cant and colleagues note that "curiosity about the origin and prevalence of NDEs has escalated as technology and resuscitation techniques have improved". The topic attracts a lot of interest, which is reflected in search engine results, medical literature, opinion pieces, and commentary. Kopel and Webb note the large output of material from the field of near-death studies since the mid-1970s, which has attracted the perspectives of both believers and skeptics, and reflected both the naturalistic perspectives of neurology and physiology, as well as perspectives that are not naturalistic. Kinsella also noted that the field of near-death studies have facilitated the emergence of an "afterlife movement" and that "growing scholarly interest has followed popular interest in the subject" of NDE's. According to literature, "psychiatrists have played a role in the recognition of the "near-death" phenomenon as well as popularization of the subject and subsequent research".

While there is not yet any academic consensus as to what the philosophical implications of NDE studies might be, the question of whatever the true and fundamental nature of human consciousness might be yet remains both unanswered, and highly contentious. Still, NDE researchers are in general agreement that NDE research is now a legitimate academic field of scientific research, and many recent discoveries in this field give rise to the hopes by some researchers that a "breakthrough" in the modern day understanding of the dying process may be imminent.

Skepticism towards the findings of near-death studies, and the validity of the near-death experience as a subject for scientific study, has been widespread. According to Knapton, in The Daily Telegraph, the subject was, until recently, controversial. Both scientists and medical professionals have, in general, tended to be skeptical. According to commentators in the field, the early study of near-death experiences was met with "academic disbelief". Acceptance of NDEs as a legitimate topic for scientific study has improved, but the process has been slow.

Skeptics have remarked that it is difficult to verify many of the anecdotal reports that are being used as background material in order to outline the features of the NDE. Psychologist Christopher French has reviewed several of the theories that have originated from the field of near-death studies. This includes theories that present a challenge to modern neuroscience by suggesting a new understanding of the mind-brain relationship in the direction of transcendental, or paranormal, elements. In reply to this French considers the conventional scientific understanding, and introduces several non-paranormal factors, as well as psychological theory, that might explain those near-death experiences that defy conventional scientific explanations; however, he does not rule out a future revision of modern neuroscience, awaiting new and improved research procedures.

As for prospective studies in the field of near-death research, Kovoor and colleagues noted that there are some "methodological concerns within many of the prospective studies" mapped by their scoping review. They also observed: "Longer-term outcomes may have been biased by clinical characteristics and comorbidities, rather than near-death experiences, and this should remain a pertinent consideration." Engmann, who discussed the AWARE-study from 2014, points out that NDE research does not fulfil quality criteria of medical studies, namely objectivity. Evrard and colleagues, commenting upon the current state of Near-death research and terminology, expressed less confidence in the core phenomenology of NDEs, and the NDE-model proposed by Moody, in contrast to other NDE-models. They also noted that it is difficult to come up with a precise definition of the NDE-phenomenon within this field of research. Criticism of the field has also come from commentators within its own ranks. In an open letter to the NDE community, Ring pointed to the "issue of possible religious bias in near-death studies". According to Ring, the field of near-death studies, as well as the larger NDE-movement, seemed to attract a number of religious ideologies and controversies in the years leading up to the turn of the century. This was a development that Ring thought was unfortunate and that in his view had compromised the integrity of research and discussion.

== See also ==
- Human Consciousness Project
- Parapsychology
- Transpersonal psychology

== Notes ==
a. van Lommel et al., 2001: Table 2
b. The diagnostic label of "Religious or spiritual problem" is included in DSM-IV under the category of "Other conditions that may be a focus of clinical attention". See American Psychiatric Association (1994) "Diagnostic and Statistical Manual of Mental Disorders", fourth edition. Washington, D.C.: American Psychiatric Association (Code V62.89, Religious or Spiritual Problem).
c. Reported memories were assessed by the Greyson NDE Scale.
