= Bruce Greyson =

American psychiatrist

- Education: Cornell University; SUNY Upstate Medical University
- Awards: Bruce Greyson Research Award from the International Association for Near-Death Studies
- Scientific career
- Fields: Near-death studies
- Workplaces: University of Virginia
- Website: www.brucegreyson.com

Charles Bruce Greyson (born October 1946) is an American psychiatrist and near-death experience researcher. During his research of near-death experiences, known as near-death studies, he has documented many accounts of near-death experiences, and has written many journal articles, as well as participated in media interviews on the subject, playing a crucial role in inviting broader cross-disciplinary scientific inquiry to the field.

== Biography ==
Greyson received his AB in psychology from Cornell University in 1969 and his MD from SUNY Upstate Medical University in 1973. He completed his residency in psychiatry at the University of Virginia Health System in 1976.

He was on the faculty of University of Virginia School of Medicine (1976-1978, 1995-2014), University of Michigan Medical School (1978-1984), and University of Connecticut School of Medicine (1984-1995). Since 2014 he's Professor Emeritus of Psychiatry and Neurobehavioral Sciences at the University of Virginia.

== Academic appointments ==
Greyson is Professor Emeritus of Psychiatry and Neurobehavioral Sciences, and the former director of The Division of Perceptual Studies (DOPS), formerly the Division of Personality Studies, at the University of Virginia. He is also a Professor of Psychiatric Medicine in the Department of Psychiatric Medicine, Division of Outpatient Psychiatry, at the University of Virginia.

== Research work ==
Greyson is a researcher in the field of near-death studies and has been called the father of research in near-death experiences. Greyson, along with Kenneth Ring, Michael Sabom, and others, built on the research of Raymond Moody, Russell Noyes Jr and Elisabeth Kübler-Ross. Greyson's scale to measure the aspects of near-death experiences has been widely used, being cited over 450 times as of early 2021. He also devised a 19-item scale to assess experience of kundalini, the Physio-Kundalini Scale.

Greyson wrote the overview of Near Death Experiences for the Encyclopædia Britannica and was the Editor-in-Chief of the Journal of Near-Death Studies (formerly Anabiosis) from 1982 through 2007. Greyson has been interviewed or consulted many times in the press on the subject of near-death experiences.

== Selected publications ==
Greyson is author of After: A Doctor Explores What Near-Death Experiences Reveal about Life and Beyond (Macmillan, 2021), co-author of Irreducible Mind: Toward a Psychology for the 21st Century (Rowman and Littlefield, 2007) and co-editor of The Handbook of Near-Death Experiences: Thirty Years of Investigation (Praeger, 2009). He has written many journal articles on the subject of near-death experiences, and these include:

- Greyson B (2010). "Implications of near-death experiences for a post materialist psychology" (PDF). Psychology of Religion and Spirituality. 2: 37–45. doi:10.1037/a0018548.
- Greyson B (2007). "Near-death experience: Clinical implications" (PDF). Rev Psiq Clin. 34: 116–125.
- Greyson B (2006). "Near-death experiences and spirituality" (PDF). Zygon. 41 (2): 393–414. doi:10.1111/j.1467-9744.2005.00745.x.
- Greyson, B (2005). ""False positive" claims of near-death experiences and "false negative" denials of near-death experiences" (PDF). Death Studies. 29 (2): 145–55. doi:10.1080/07481180590906156. PMID 15822242. S2CID 11555640.
- Greyson, B; Ring, K. (2004). "The Life Changes Inventory – Revised" (PDF). Journal of Near-Death Studies. 23: 41–54.
- Greyson, B; Liester, MB (2004). "Auditory Hallucinations Following Near-Death Experiences" (PDF). Journal of Humanistic Psychology. 44 (3): 320–336. doi:10.1177/0022167804266281. S2CID 143927327.
- Lange, R; Greyson, B; Houran, J (2004). "A Rasch scaling validation of a 'core' near-death experience" (PDF). British Journal of Psychology. 95 (Pt 2): 161–77. doi:10.1348/000712604773952403. PMID 15142300.
- Greyson B (2003). "Incidence and correlates of near-death experiences on a cardiac care unit" (PDF). Gen Hosp Psychiatry. 25 (4): 269–276. doi:10.1016/s0163-8343(03)00042-2. PMID 12850659.

== See also ==
- George G. Ritchie
- Satwant Pasricha
- Life After Life
- Pam Reynolds case
- Eben Alexander (author)
- Raymond Moody
- Pim van Lommel
- Sam Parnia
- Jeffrey Long
