= John Audette =

John Audette (born May 1952) is an American medical sociologist and co-founder of the International Association for Near-Death Studies (IANDS). In 1981, together with medical researchers Bruce Greyson, Kenneth Ring, and Michael Sabom, he participated in officially establishing the nonprofit organization initially named the Association for the Scientific Study of Near-Death Experiences, later known as IANDS.

== Birth of IANDS ==
In November 1977, Audette organized the first informal meeting of researchers at the University of Virginia, aiming to collaborate with Raymond Moody in the emerging field of near-death studies. This core group maintained close communication, planning the establishment of an organization dedicated to advancing this research area.

The new association was conceived as a global community comprising scientists, scholars, experiencers, and the general public, focused on exploring the near-death experience phenomenon and its implications through research, education, and support.

After serving as director of the Association for the Scientific Study of Near-Death Phenomena, Audette became IANDS' first executive director and treasurer. The organization's initial board included researchers, scholars, experiencers, and interested members of the general public, with headquarters established at the University of Connecticut, Storrs.

In 1982, Audette relocated to West Palm Beach, Florida, to direct the Hospice of Palm Beach County, thus limiting his active involvement with IANDS. Subsequently, he focused his professional career on hospital and hospice administration, as well as physician practice management.

== Later Work and Publications ==
In 2012, Audette co-founded Eternea alongside Apollo 14 astronaut Edgar Mitchell and Harvard neurosurgeon Eben Alexander. Eternea is dedicated to public education and scientific research focused on consciousness and Quantum physics.

Audette has contributed to scholarly works alongside authors such as Ervin László, Deepak Chopra, Jane Goodall, Gary Zukav, Stanislav Grof, Jean Houston, and Larry Dossey.

In 2023, Audette published his first solo book, Loved by the Light.
