= After Death (2023 film) =

- Theatrical release poster
- Directed by: Stephen Gray; Chris Radtke
- Written by: Stephen Gray; Chris Radtke
- Produced by: Jason Pamer; Jens Jacob
- Cinematography: Austin Straub
- Music by: Hannah Parrott
- Production companies: Sypher Studios; Theora Films
- Distributed by: Angel Studios
- Release date: October 27, 2023 (United States)
- Running time: 108 minutes
- Country: United States
- Language: English
- Box office: $11.8 million

After Death is a 2023 American documentary film written and directed by Stephen Gray and Chris Radtke. The film chronicles the stories of various near-death experience survivors, and features analysis of these events by authors and scientists as they try to determine what happens after people die. The film features interviews, as well as re-enactments of events, as the people in the documentary discuss what may happen after death. It received mixed reviews from critics.

== Cast ==
Interviewees

- John Burke – New York Times bestselling author of Imagine Heaven and founding pastor of Gateway Church Austin
- Dr. Mary Neal – orthopedic surgeon and author of To Heaven and Back
- Dr. Michael Sabom – a cardiologist
- Dr. Jeffrey Long – author of Evidence of the Afterlife: The Science of Near-Death Experiences
- Dr. Raymond Moody – psychiatrist and author of Life After Life
- Dale Black – former airline pilot, author of Flight to Heaven and Visiting Heaven
- Don Piper – an ordained minister and author of 90 Minutes in Heaven. Piper was involved in a head-on crash with a tractor trailer in 1989 and claimed that he went to the gates of Heaven where he was greeted by his late grandfather.
- Howard Storm – a minister and author of My Descent Into Death
- Paul Ojeda – founder of Austin Powerhouse Church
- Swen Spjut – a district attorney investigator
- Dr. Ajmal Zemmar – Assistant Professor of Neurosurgery at University of Louisville
- Dean Braxton – a licensed minister and author of In Heaven!: Experiencing the Throne of God
- Dr. Karl Greene – a neurosurgeon
- Steve Kang – author of From Hell to Heaven: Buddhism to Christianity through the Gospel of Jesus and a Near Death Experience
- Anita Onarecker Wood – Director of Education and Evangelism for the Memorial Baptist Church and author of Divine Appointment: Our Journey to the Bridge
- Eva Piper – author of A Walk Through the Dark

Re-enactment

- Koko Marshall as Beverly
- Michael Jovanovski as Gene
- Kate Duffy as Eva
- Doug Lito as Howard
- Drew Neal Horton as Chuck
- Nicholas Saenz as Don
- Fabian Jaime as Paul
- Chetavious Davis as Dr. Greene
- Ryan Mcarthy as Dr. Sabom
- Nick McCloud as Dale

== Release ==
=== Box office ===
After Death has grossed $11.4 million in the United States and Canada and $352,534 in other territories, for a worldwide total of $11.8 million

The film was released on October 27, 2023, in 2,605 theaters in the United States and Canada. It made $2.1 million on its first day and a total of $5.1 million in its opening weekend, finishing in fourth.

=== Reception ===
On the review aggregator website Rotten Tomatoes, 50% of 18 critics' reviews are positive, with an average rating of 5.9/10. Metacritic, which uses a weighted average, assigned the film a score of 28 out of 100, based on 6 critics, indicating "generally unfavorable" reviews. Audiences surveyed by CinemaScore gave the film an average grade of "A−" on an A+ to F scale, while those polled at PostTrak gave it an 88% overall positive score, with 62% saying they would definitely recommend the film.

RogerEbert.com's Nick Allen, rating the film 0.5 of 4 stars, felt it "barely works as an infomercial". He went on to say "Midway through, the superficial After Death thinks you have been sold on these transcendental experiences (and maybe you have)… [It's] all about the spectacle and the emotion it can create from such an experience, and it then curdles with a creepiness when it lets people talk for longer." Variety's Owen Gleiberman similarly criticized After Death's approach, writing "After a while… we start to notice that the film is presenting the recoveries themselves as miracles… That's fine; maybe it's even faith. But when faith feels compelled to sell itself by pretending it's something else, you'd be forgiven for thinking it's propaganda." Indiewire's David Ehrlich, giving it a "D" grade, was also negative: "Audiences who swear by the gospel of Colton Burpo probably won't see the problem here, but those of us who are less inclined to believe… might struggle to accept a handful of teary anecdotes and bizarre medical anomalies as compelling evidence that Christianity got everything right about life after death. On the contrary, such viewers are liable to be left with more questions than answers."

In his review for CNN, Brian Lowry referred to After Death as "a fairly limp documentary" and compared it to the 2021 Netflix docu-series Surviving Death. Writing for The Guardian, Leslie Felperin added that "solemn music, moody lighting and dramatic re-creations don't just make things magically factual. Or even especially persuasive." Reviewing After Death for The New York Times, Nicolas Rapold stated that "the stories are rolled together in a hash of editing, and the speakers can be oddly low energy", concluding that "whether you believe these phenomena are spiritual journeys or visions created by the human mind (or both), the film loses its sense of epiphany in the lackluster jumble of its moviemaking".
