= Peter Fenwick (neuropsychologist) =

British neuropsychiatrist and neurophysiologist (1935–2024)

- Born: Peter Brooke Cadogan Fenwick; 25 May 1935; Nairobi, Kenya Colony
- Died: 22 November 2024 (aged 89); London, England
- Education: University of Cambridge
- Known for: Near-death studies
- Spouse: Elizabeth Roberts
- Children: 3
- Scientific career
- Fields: Neuropsychiatry, neurophysiology
- Workplaces: Maudsley Hospital

Peter Brooke Cadogan Fenwick (25 May 1935 – 22 November 2024) was a British neuropsychiatrist and neurophysiologist who is known for his studies of epilepsy and end-of-life phenomena.

== Background ==
Fenwick was born in Nairobi in 1935, where his family was living at the time. His English father was working on a coffee farm, and his Australian mother was a doctor. He attended the Stowe School and was a graduate of Trinity College, Cambridge, where he studied Natural Science. He obtained his clinical experience at St Thomas' Hospital.

== Career ==
Fenwick was a senior lecturer at King's College, London, where he worked as a consultant at the Institute of Psychiatry. He was the Consultant Neuropsychologist at both the Maudsley, and John Radcliffe hospitals, and also provided services for Broadmoor Hospital. He worked with the Mental Health Group at the University of Southampton, and held a visiting professorship at the Riken Neurosciences Institute in Japan.

Fenwick was the president of the Horizon Research Foundation, an organisation that supports research into end-of-life experiences. He was the President of the British branch of the International Association for Near-Death Studies. As of 2008 Fenwick was a part of the Human Consciousness Project. The first study from the project was called The AWARE (AWAreness during REsuscitation) study and was published in 2014.

Fenwick was part of the editorial board for a number of journals, including the Journal of Neurology, Neurosurgery, and Psychiatry, the Journal of Consciousness Studies and the Journal of Epilepsy and Behaviour.

== Near-death research ==
Fenwick's interest in near-death experiences was piqued when he read Raymond Moody's book Life After Life. Initially skeptical of Moody's anecdotal evidence, Fenwick reassessed his opinion after a discussion with one of his own patients, who described a near-death experience very similar to that of Moody's subjects. Since then, he collected and analysed more than 300 examples of near-death experiences.

He was criticised by some in the medical community for arguing that human consciousness can survive bodily death. Fenwick argued that human consciousness may be more than just a function of the brain.

The plain fact is that none of us understands these phenomena. As for the soul and life after death, they are still open questions, though I myself suspect that NDEs are part of the same continuum as mystical experiences.

Fenwick and his wife are co-authors of The Art of Dying, a study of the spiritual needs of near-death patients. The Fenwicks argue that modern medical practices have devalued end-of-life experiences, and call for a more holistic approach to death and dying. In 2003, Fenwick and Sam Parnia appeared in the BBC documentary "The Day I Died". In the documentary Parnia and Fenwick discussed their belief that research from near-death experiences indicates the mind is independent of the brain. According to psychologist and lecturer Susan Blackmore the documentary misled viewers with beliefs that are rejected by the majority of scientists. Blackmore criticized the documentary for biased and "dishonest reporting".

Fenwick and Parnia have claimed that research from NDEs may show the "mind is still there after the brain is dead". The neurologist Michael O'Brien wrote "most people would not find it necessary to postulate such a separation between mind and brain to explain the events," and suggested that further research is likely to provide a physical explanation for near-death experiences. Robert Todd Carroll wrote that Fenwick has made metaphysical assumptions and dismissed possible psychological and physiological explanations for near-death experiences.

== Personal life and death ==
Fenwick's interests included hill-walking and fishing. He was married to Elizabeth (née Roberts) Fenwick, who co-authored many of his books. The couple had three children. Fenwick died at home in London on 22 November 2024, at the age of 89.

In 2019, Fenwick published his autobiography, Shining Light on Transcendence: The Unconventional Journey of a Neuroscientist, in which he described transformative meetings and experiences with the philosopher Alain Forget.

== Selected bibliography ==
=== With Elizabeth Fenwick ===
- The Art of Dying (Continuum, 2008)
- Past Lives: An Investigation into Reincarnation Memories (Berkley, 2001)
- The Hidden Door: Understanding and Controlling Dreams (Berkley Publishing Group, 1999)
- The Truth in the Light: An Investigation of Over 300 Near-Death Experiences (Berkley Trade, 1997)
- Living with Epilepsy (Bloomsbury, 1996)
