= Sam Parnia =

British medical researcher and writer

- Born: London, England
- Education: Guys and St. Thomas' Medical School (MBBS), University of Southampton (Ph.D.), University of London and Weill Cornell Medical Center (residency)
- Known for: Research on near-death experiences and cardiopulmonary resuscitation
- Scientific career
- Fields: Intensive-care medicine
- Workplaces: New York University Grossman School of Medicine, New York

Sam Parnia is a British associate professor of medicine at the NYU Langone Medical Center, where he is also director of research into cardiopulmonary resuscitation. In the United Kingdom, Parnia is director of the Human Consciousness Project at the University of Southampton. Parnia is known for his work on near-death experiences and cardiopulmonary resuscitation.

== Education and career ==
Parnia graduated from Guy's and St. Thomas' Medical School in London, where he received his MBBS in 1995. He then pursued further studies at the University of Southampton, working as a clinical research fellow and obtaining a PhD in cell biology in 2007. He maintained an honorary research fellow title at the University of Southampton and continued his collaboration through the Human Consciousness Project, which he founded and directs.

After completing his fellowship training in Pulmonary and Critical Care Medicine at the University of London and the Weill Cornell Medical College in New York City in 2010, Parnia joined the faculty at Stony Brook University School of Medicine as a member of the Pulmonary, Critical Care, and Sleep Division. He also leads research on cardiopulmonary resuscitation at Stony Brook University. His British medical qualifications were recognized as a medical degree by the State of New York in 2012. In 2013, he published the book "Erasing Death: The Science That Is Rewriting the Boundaries Between Life and Death," which provides an updated overview of cardiac resuscitation. Since 2015, he has been the director of the Critical Care & Resuscitation Research Division of Pulmonary, Critical Care & Sleep Medicine at New York University Langone Medical Center.

Additionally, Parnia has served as the chairman of the Horizon Research Foundation, a charity founded in 1987 to support research and education in the fields of death, cardiac arrest, mind, brain, and consciousness studies As of 2018, the charity has ceased to exist.

In August 2024 he published Lucid Dying, a blend of new research and personal experience which "tackles fundamental questions about existence and awareness."

== Research ==
=== Optimization of brain resuscitation after cardiac arrest ===
Parnia is known for his involvement and research in the field of emergency medicine and cardiac arrest resuscitation. He conducts research on, and advocates for wider application of, best practices for resuscitation when people die; namely better, perhaps automated cardiopulmonary resuscitation techniques, the use of targeted temperature management, extracorporeal membrane oxygenation, brain oximetry, and prevention of reperfusion injury, and wrote his book, Erasing Death (published in the United Kingdom as the Lazarus Effect) as part of that effort. He says that many people who are actually dead from heart attacks or blood loss could be resuscitated up to 24 hours after their decease if contemporary best practices as defined by the International Liaison Committee on Resuscitation were used promptly.

The main focus of Parnia's research has been in the optimization of brain monitoring and oxygen delivery methods with a goal of reducing long-term brain injuries as well as disorders of consciousness such as a persistent vegetative state. In order to avoid these disabilities, Parnia believes the study of consciousness should be a routine part of cardiac arrest brain injury research. The other side of his work, which he conducts with a team at the State University of New York and across multiple other medical centers in the United Kingdom, is consciousness during cardiac arrest. This includes near-death experiences.

=== Consciousness and near death experience research ===
Parnia has advocated for the use of the term "actual death experience" instead of near death experience (NDE), to describe human experiences that occur during a period of cardiac arrest. He has stated: “contrary to perception, death is not a specific moment but a potentially reversible process that occurs after any severe illness or accident causes the heart, lungs and brain to cease functioning. If attempts are made to reverse this process, it is referred to as ‘cardiac arrest’; however, if these attempts do not succeed it is called ‘death’. He has mostly studied those who have no heart beat and no detectable brain activity for periods of time and believes cardiac arrest is the optimal model to help understand the human experience of death.

In 2001, Parnia and colleagues published the results of a year-long study of cardiac arrest survivors. 63 survivors were interviewed; 7 had memories of the time they were unconscious and 4 had experiences that, according to the study criteria, were NDEs. Out of body claims were tested by placing figures on suspended boards facing the ceiling, not visible from the floor. No positive results were reported, and no conclusions could be drawn due to the small number of subjects.

=== AWAreness during REsuscitation (AWARE) study ===
While at the University of Southampton, Parnia was the principal investigator of the AWARE Study, which was launched in 2008. This study, which concluded in 2012, included 33 investigators across 15 medical centers in the UK, Austria and the USA and it tested consciousness, memories and awareness during cardiac arrest. The accuracy of claims of visual and auditory awareness were examined using specific tests. One such test consisted of installing shelves, bearing a variety of images and facing the ceiling (hence not visible to hospital staff), in rooms where cardiac arrests were more likely to occur. The results of the study were published in October 2014; both the launch and the study results were widely discussed in the media.

A review article analysing the results reports that out of 2060 cardiac arrest events, 101 of 140 cardiac arrest survivors could complete the questionnaires. Of these 101 patients, 9% could be classified as near-death experiences. 2 more patients (2% of those completing the questionnaires) described "seeing and hearing actual events related to the period of cardiac arrest". These two patients' cardiac arrests did not occur in areas equipped with ceiling shelves, hence no images could be used to objectively test for visual awareness claims. One of the two patients was too sick and the accuracy of her recount could not be verified. For the second patient, it was possible to verify the accuracy of their experience and to show that paradoxically, awareness occurred some minutes after the heart stopped, at a time when "the brain ordinarily stops functioning and cortical activity becomes isoelectric." The experience was not compatible with an illusion, imaginary event or hallucination since visual (other than of ceiling shelves' images) and auditory awareness could be corroborated.

=== Aware II study ===
As of May 2016, a posting at the UK Clinical Trials Gateway website describes plans for AWARE II, a two-year multicenter observational study of 900-1,500 patients experiencing cardiac arrest, with subjects being recruited as 1 August 2014 and a trial end date of 31 May 2017.

=== Brain/mind hypotheses ===
Parnia and others have suggested that a mind that is mediated by, but not produced by, the brain, is a possible way to explain NDE. Recent support that mind can separate from the body and hence the brain is provided by Mays & Mays (2024).

Science writer Mike McRae (2014) suggests that "While Parnia's work contributes valuable data to understanding NDE as a cultural phenomenon, his speculations do indeed sit on the brink of pseudoscience." Neurologist Michael O'Brien (2003) writes that "most people would not find it necessary to postulate such a separation between mind and brain to explain the events," and suggested that further research is likely to provide a physical explanation for near-death experiences". Psychologist and lecturer Susan Blackmore (2003) appeared with Parnia and Peter Fenwick on a BBC documentary called "The Day I Died" and disagreed with their interpretations of NDEs, finding purely physical explanations to be more plausible.

In a 2014 review article published in the Annals of the New York Academy of Sciences, Parnia admits that the nature of consciousness is still uncharted territory for science. Two different major models have been postulated about the nature of consciousness:

1. one envisages the psyche/consciousness/mind (self) as the result of neuronal activity. So a causative relationship exists between cortical activity and consciousness.
2. the other instead considers that consciousness is separate from the brain and can influence brain activity independently of the brain.

Parnia explains that the observations that "the human mind, consciousness, or psyche (self) may continue to function when brain function has ceased during the early period after death" (such as during the AWARE study, but not only) points to the possibility that the second model may have to be taken into account.

== See also ==
- Bruce Greyson
- Raymond Moody
- Pim van Lommel
- Jeffrey Long

== Selected bibliography ==
Books

- What Happens When We Die. Hay House. 2007. ISBN 9781401907112.
- Erasing Death: The Science That is Rewriting the Boundaries Between Life and Death. Harper Collins. 2013. ISBN 9780062080608.
- The Lazarus Effect: The Science That is Rewriting the Boundaries Between Life and Death. Rider. 2013. ISBN 9781846043079.

Research publications

- Parnia, S; Waller, DG; Yeates, R; Fenwick, P (2001). "A qualitative and quantitative study of the incidence, features and aetiology of near-death experiences in cardiac arrest survivors". Resuscitation. 48 (2): 149–56. doi:10.1016/s0300-9572(00)00328-2. PMID 11426476.
- Parnia S, et al. (Aug 2012). "A feasibility study evaluating the role of cerebral oximetry in predicting return of spontaneous circulation in cardiac arrest". Resuscitation. 83 (8): 982–5. doi:10.1016/j.resuscitation.2012.01.039. PMID 22322284.
- Ahn A, Yang J, Inigo-Santiago L, Parnia S (Apr 2014). "A feasibility study of cerebral oximetry monitoring during the post-resuscitation period in comatose patients following cardiac arrest". Resuscitation. 85 (4): 522–6. doi:10.1016/j.resuscitation.2013.12.007. PMID 24361675.
- Parnia S, et al. (Apr 2014). "A feasibility study of cerebral oximetry during in-hospital mechanical and manual cardiopulmonary resuscitation". Crit. Care Med. 42 (4): 930–3. doi:10.1097/CCM.0000000000000047. PMID 24247475. S2CID 16856630.
- Parnia, S; Spearpoint, K; de Vos, G; Fenwick, P; et al. (2014). "AWARE-AWAreness during REsuscitation-a prospective study". Resuscitation. 85 (12): 1799–805. doi:10.1016/j.resuscitation.2014.09.004. PMID 25301715.
- Singer AJ, et al. (May 2015). "Cerebral oximetry levels during CPR are associated with return of spontaneous circulation following cardiac arrest: an observational study". Emerg Med J. 32 (5): 353–6. doi:10.1136/emermed-2013-203467. PMID 24662518. S2CID 24626288.
- Parnia S, Yang J, Nguyen R, Ahn A, et al. (2016). "(Sept 2016) Cerebral Oximetry During Cardiac Arrest: A Multicenter Study of Neurologic Outcomes and Survival" (PDF). Critical Care Medicine. 44 (9): 1663–1674. doi:10.1097/CCM.0000000000001723. PMID 27071068. S2CID 10214687.

Reviews and editorials

- Parnia, Sam (2007). "Do reports of consciousness during cardiac arrest hold the key to discovering the nature of consciousness?". Medical Hypotheses. 69 (4): 933–7. doi:10.1016/j.mehy.2007.01.076. PMID 17459598. - in the controversial and non-peer reviewed Medical Hypotheses
- Parnia, Sam (2014). "Death and consciousness - an overview of the mental and cognitive experience of death". Ann N Y Acad Sci. 1330 (1): 75–93. doi:10.1111/nyas.12582. PMID 25418460. S2CID 33091589.
