= Peter Fenwick =

Peter Fenwick may refer to:

- Peter Fenwick (politician) (born 1944), Canadian politician
- Peter Fenwick (neuropsychologist) (1935–2024), neuropsychiatrist and neurophysiologist
- Peter Holmes (businessman) (1932–2002), who wrote as Peter Fenwick
