= Human Consciousness Project =

Research organization

The Human Consciousness Project is a professional organization, located at the University of Southampton, set up to study the nature of consciousness, the human brain and clinical death. The project is multidisciplinary and involves scientists and physicians worldwide. Sam Parnia serves as director of the project.

== History ==
The organization was founded by Sam Parnia. In 2008 the project announced that it was undertaking a collaboration with 25 medical centers across Europe and America in preparation for a study called AWARE (AWAreness during REsuscitation). More than 1000 cardiac arrest survivors were recruited for the study. The study was to introduce a multi-disciplinary perspective, cerebral monitoring techniques, and innovative tests. Among the innovative research designs was the placement of images in resuscitation areas. The images were placed on shelves below the ceiling and could only be seen from above. The design was constructed in order to verify the possibility of out-of-body experiences.

=== AWARE-study ===
The first results from the AWARE-study were published in the medical journal Resuscitation in 2014, and attracted the attention of the media. The study was led by Parnia together with Peter Fenwick, Stephen Holgate and Robert Peveler. The article was a multi-author text. The authors reported that 101 out of 140 patients completed stage 2 interviews. They found that 9 out of 101 cardiac arrest survivors had experiences that could be classified as near-death experiences. 46% could retrieve memories from their cardiac arrest, and the memories could be subdivided into the following categories: fear; animals/plants; bright light; violence/persecution; deja-vu; family; recalling events post-CA. Of these, 2% fulfilled the criteria of the Greyson NDE scale and reported an out-of-body experience with awareness of the resuscitation situation. Of these, 1 person described details related to technical resuscitation equipment. None of the patients reported seeing the test design with upward facing images.

=== AWARE II ===
A follow-up study called AWAreness during REsuscitation - II, not officially connected to the original project at Southampton, was published in 2023 in the journal Resuscitation.
