= Journal of Near-Death Studies =

- Discipline: Near-death studies
- Language: English
- Edited by: Janice Holden

Publication details
- Former name: Anabiosis
- History: 1982-present
- Publisher: International Association for Near-Death Studies
- Frequency: Quarterly

Standard abbreviations
- ISO 4: J. Near-Death Stud.

Indexing
- CODEN: JNDAE7
- ISSN: 0891-4494 (print); 1573-3661 (web)
- LCCN: 88648131
- OCLC no.: 45254332

Links
- Journal homepage

The Journal of Near-Death Studies is a quarterly peer-reviewed academic journal devoted to the field of near-death studies. It is published by the International Association for Near-Death Studies.

The journal's founding editor-in-chief was Kenneth Ring. Subsequent editors were Bruce Greyson and Janice Holden.

== History ==
The journal was established in 1982 as Anabiosis and obtained its current title in 1987 with the start of volume 6. From 1997 to 2003 the journal was published by Kluwer Academic Publishers, but this arrangement was discontinued upon completion of volume 21.

== See also ==
- Journal of Parapsychology
- Journal of the American Society for Psychical Research
- Near-death experience
- Near-death studies
