= Melvin L. Morse =

American medical doctor (born 1953)

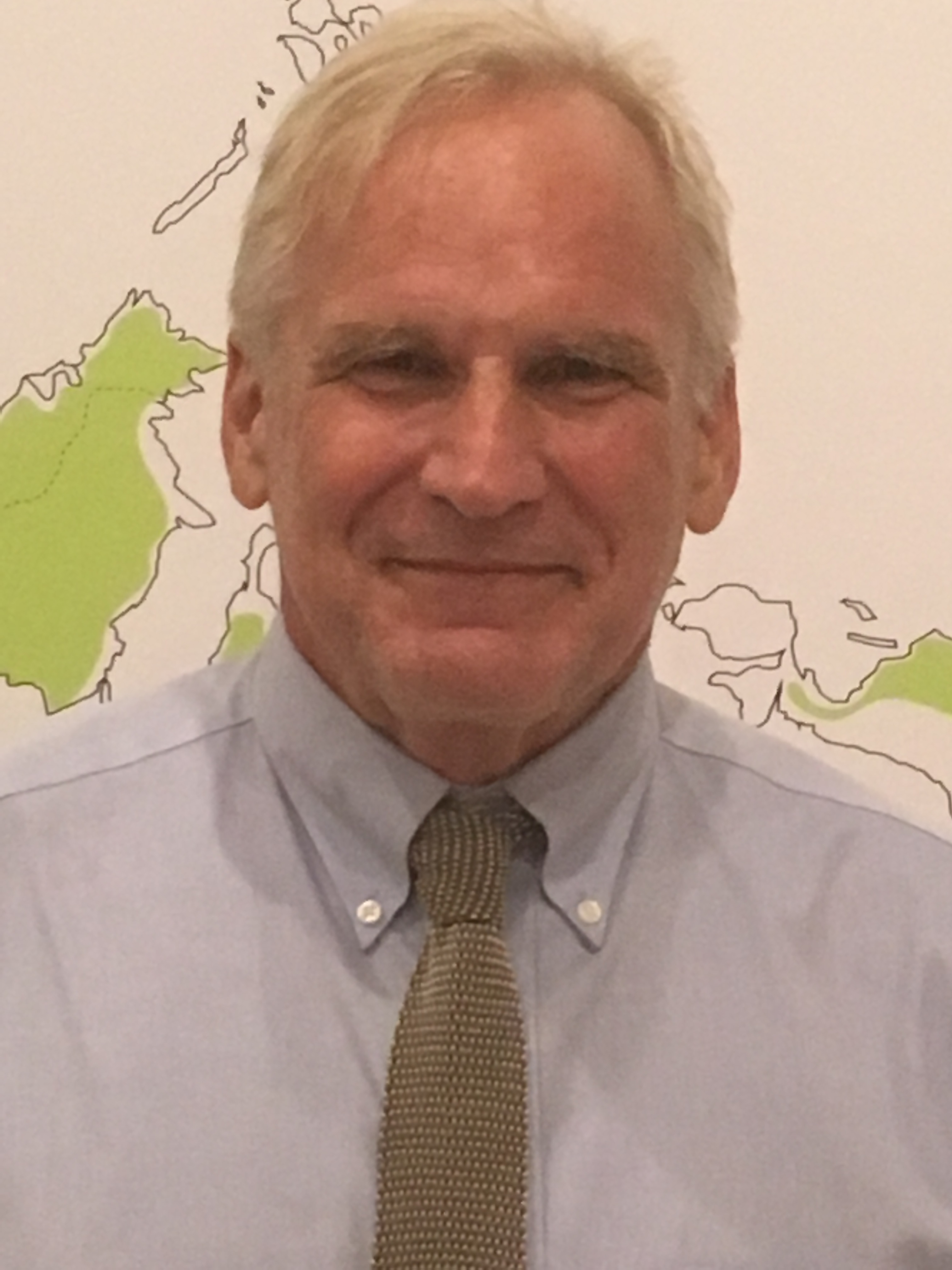
- Born: December 11, 1953 (age 72); Sandy Springs, Maryland
- Education: George Washington University
- Occupation: Pediatrician
- Known for: Near-death experience interest
- Children: 6
- Website: www.melvinmorsemd.com

Melvin L. Morse (born December 11, 1953) is an American physician who specializes in pediatrics. He has authored several books and articles on paranormal science and near-death experiences in children, including the 1987 New York Times bestseller Closer to the Light, written jointly with Paul Perry, and with a foreword written by Raymond Moody. Morse has authored many journal articles, and has given media interviews on the subject of near-death experiences.

Morse is head of the Institute for the Scientific Study of Consciousness (ISSC), an institution founded by Charles Tart, PhD in 1979 dedicated to the scientific exploration of human consciousness and its different manifestations.

In 2023, Morse became one of the winners of the BICS Challenge, a ground-breaking research program created by the Bigelow Institute for Consciousness Studies to support research into both the survival of human consciousness after physical death and the nature of the afterlife. Together with the ISSC team of associates, which includes Dr. Jose Miguel Gaona, MD, Ph.D., Isabelle Chauffeton Saavedra, Lance Williams Beem, MA, Raymond Moody MD, and AJ Parr, Morse conducted the groundbreaking research with the participation of nineteen hand-picked, certified mediums who were asked to connect with the afterlife over a nine-month period and later prepared the conclusions and final report: “An Investigation into the Current Status of the Spiritual Progress of Humanity as Ascertained by Interviewing Nineteen Mediums,”

== Early life and education ==
Morse graduated from Johns Hopkins University in Baltimore, Maryland in 1975 with a Bachelor of Arts degree in Natural Science. Morse earned a medical degree from George Washington University in Washington, D.C. in 1980. He interned in Pediatrics at the University of California at San Francisco, and then completed a residency in Pediatrics at Seattle Children's Hospital. He subsequently completed a two-year fellowship in Hematology/Oncology and a one-year fellowship in Behavioral Pediatrics.

== Career ==
Morse practiced pediatrics in Renton, Washington during the 1980s, and also served as an Associate Professor of Pediatrics at the University of Washington in Seattle. In the mid 1980s, Morse began to research near death experiences. In November 1986, he published a study on the subject in the American Journal of Diseases of Children. The study interviewed 11 patients, who had all by definition had a near death experience, such as a cardiac arrest. These experiences were documented during interviews with the children, and then compared to 29 children that had been admitted to intensive care, but not had a near death experience. All of the near-death children had memories from being unconscious, such as seeing a tunnel or light, and actively deciding to return to the body. In comparison, the 29 children in intensive care had no memory from the time they were unconscious.

Morse suggested to the Los Angeles Times during an interview that he and his colleagues at University of Washington School of Medicine had to abandon their initial theory - that near death experiences were simply a reaction to drugs during life saving attempts. Initially the aim of the research had been to narrow down which drugs likely caused near death experiences. The findings led Morse to spend the next decade of his life studying near death experiences. In 1991, Morse released Closer to the Light, which included some of the initial theories and further findings from investigating NDE's in children. In March 1995, Morse's studies featured in an article ran by the Los Angeles Times analyzing near-death experiences. The book documented the near-death experiences of 26 children and became a New York Times bestseller. He was interviewed on Oprah Winfrey about the book in 1992 and on Larry King in 2010. The PBS show Upon Reflection produced a half-hour episode devoted to Morse. He was the subject of an article in the Rolling Stone magazine in 2004 entitled "In search of the Dead Zone" and appeared in an episode of Unsolved Mysteries. In 2000, Morse and Paul Perry released a book studying the scientific frontiers in the study of cognitive psychology. The book "Where God Lives" presents the theory of plausibility in various subject areas, such as religion and the paranormal, including that religion is often associated with the right frontal lobe. This continued from research Morse did in the 1990s. A review in the peer reviewed Journal of Near-Death Studies stated "Morse wrote the book for mainstream audiences interested in a New Paradigm... it will hold their interest and fascinate them." John Tomlinson for the American Institute of Health and Science stated he believed the authors "lead us right to the edge of faith-based science."

He retired from the full-time practice of Pediatrics in 2006 and worked at a pediatrician office in Milton, Delaware.

Morse was voted one of “America’s Best Doctors” by his peers in 2001–2002 as one of the top pediatricians in the country. In 2010 the Journal of Near-Death Studies published his article “Near-death experiences, deathbed visions, and past-life memories: A convergence in support of van Lommel’s Consciousness beyond life” A year later, in 2011, he became one of the recipients of the Warcollier Research Award granted by IRVA/IRIS. He has also conducted research on children’s near-death experiences, childhood leukemia, PTSD management, the new scientific paradigm of consciousness, random number generation, and the benefits of reiki therapy and kundalini meditation, among others. In 2023-2024 he participated as research team leader in the BICS Challenge Program, organized by the Bigelow Institute for Consciousness Studies, which queried the afterlife through sixty-seven mediums from six international teams on four foundational, interlinked, existential questions.

Following a hearing in June 2022, Morse’s medical license was reinstated after being suspended in 2012, when he was arrested and later convicted of child endangerment. In 2012, he and his second wife were arrested on child endangerment charges based on allegations made by his eleven year old step-daughter. Morse was convicted of reckless endangerment and was sentenced to serve three years in prison. His license was also suspended in Delaware following his arrest. The step-daughter who made the allegations against Morse & his wife, was later proved to have lied on the witness stand in a previous case, which resulted in her sister spending a year in juvenile prison. In 2023, Morse became one of the winners of the BICS Challenge Program funded by the Bigelow Institute for Consciousness Studies to support research into both the survival of human consciousness after physical death and the nature of the afterlife.

Following his release, Morse co-founded The Recidivism Prevention Group, a company dedicated to assisting addicts and former inmates in developing spiritual understandings to re-enter society as productive members. The group uses meditation techniques to accomplish these goals. Morse now resides in Washington, DC.

On September 13, 2022, Delaware's Medical Licensure and Discipline Board announced that the temporary suspension of Morse's medical license had been lifted. This was following a hearing by the board that took place on June 16, 2022.

== Institute for the Scientific Study of Consciousness ==
The Institute for the Scientific Study of Consciousness (ISSC) is a non-profit organization founded in 1979 by Charles Tart, professor emeritus of psychology at the University of California, Davis, but for most of the 21st century it has been led by Morse. Tart was a pioneering figure in parapsychology and transpersonal psychology, Tart created the ISSC to conduct scientific research on consciousness and altered states of consciousness.

=== Founding (1979–2004) ===
During its early years, and under Tart’s leadership, the ISSC focused on experimental research into out-of-body experiences and extrasensory perception (ESP). In 1982, the Institute, in collaboration with the University of California, Davis, developed a computer-controlled ESP feedback training system.

One of Tart’s most notable initiatives at ISSC was the creation of the "Archives of Scientists' Transcendent Experiences" (TASTE), the world’s first online repository of self-reported transcendent experiences by scientists. These personal accounts—spiritual, mystical, or paranormal in nature—were collected in a confidential, optionally anonymous, and carefully curated environment. Contributors included scientists from fields such as anthropology, botany, mathematics, physics, psychology, and zoology, many of whom feared professional backlash if they shared these experiences in public forums.

=== Second Phase (2004–present) ===
By the early 2000s, the Institute entered a new chapter under the leadership of pediatrician and near-death experience researcher Melvin L. Morse, who joined as Research Director in 2004 following a twenty-year medical career. Two years later, he assumed the role of President. Under his guidance, the ISSC broadened its research scope to include studies on children's near-death experiences, childhood leukemia, post-traumatic stress disorder (PTSD), random number generation, and alternative therapies such as reiki and kundalini meditation.

In 2010, the Journal of Near-Death Studies published Morse’s article “Near-death experiences, deathbed visions, and past-life memories: A convergence in support of van Lommel’s Consciousness beyond life.”

In 2011, Morse was among the recipients of the Warcollier Research Award from the International Remote Viewing Association (IRVA) and the Institute for Resonance and Intuition Studies (IRIS).

In 2023, the ISSC research team led by Morse was named one of the winners of the BICS Challenge research program, sponsored by the Bigelow Institute for Consciousness Studies to explore evidence of the survival of human consciousness after death. Together with the ISSC research team, including Raymond Moody, José Miguel Gaona, AJ Parr, Isabelle Chauffeton Saavedra, and Lance Williams Beem, Morse oversaw a nine-month study to support research into both the survival of human consciousness after physical death and the nature of the afterlife. The project, titled “An Investigation into the Current Status of the Spiritual Progress of Humanity as Ascertained by Interviewing Nineteen Mediums,” addressed four interrelated existential questions concerning the afterlife and the present state of mankind.

== Personal life ==
Morse has been married twice and has six children.

== Bibliography ==
=== Books ===
- Morse, Melvin (1991). Closer to the Light. Random House Digital. ISBN 9780804108324.
- Morse, Melvin; Perry, Paul (1994). Parting Visions:: Pre-Death Visions and Spiritual Experiences. Random House Publishing Group. ISBN 9780679427544.
- Morse, Melvin; Perry, Paul (1992). Transformed by the Light: The Powerful Effect of Near Death Experiences on People's Lives. Random House. ISBN 0679404430.
- Morse, Melvin; Perry, Paul (2001). Where God Lives: Paranormal Science and How Our Brains Are Connected to the Universe. Harper Collins. ISBN 0061095044.

=== Journal articles ===
- Morse, ML, Castillo P, and Venecia D; et al. (November 1986). "Near Death Experiences in a Pediatric Population" (PDF). American Journal of Diseases in Children. Vol. 140 No 11 1110-1115. Archived from the original (PDF) on 2016-08-25.
- Morse, Melvin (1994). "Current Problems in Pediatrics" (PDF). Near Death Experiences and Death Related Visions for the Clinician (Mosby). Vol. 24 55-83. Archived from the original (PDF) on 2016-08-26.
- Morse, ML; Williams, L (December 2011). "Benefits of Reiki Therapy to a Severely Neutropenic Patient with Associated Influences on a True Random Number Generator". J Alt Comp Med. PMC 3239316.
- Christenson, PJ, Hardoin, RA, Hennsley, JA, Morse, ML (October 1993). "The Effect of Premonitions of SIDS on Grieving and Healing" (PDF). The SIDS Survival Guide. Archived from the original (PDF) on 2016-08-26.
- Morse, Melvin (March 2019). "The Subjective Experiences of Two Heroin Addicts Who were Taught Kundalini Yoga While Incarcerated".
