= George G. Ritchie =

American writer and psychiatrist (1923–2007)

George G. Ritchie (25 September 1923 – 29 October 2007) was an American psychiatrist who held positions as president of the Richmond Academy of General Practice; chairman of the Department of Psychiatry of Towers Hospital; and founder and president of the Universal Youth Corps, Inc. for almost 20 years. In 1967 he entered private psychiatry practice in Charlottesville, Virginia, and in 1983 moved to Anniston, Alabama, to serve as head of the Department of Psychiatry at the Northeast Alabama Regional Medical Center. He returned to Richmond in 1986 to continue in private practice until retirement in 1992.

== Near-death experience ==
In 1943 as a young army recruit in Texas Ritchie caught pneumonia and passed out. He was placed in an isolation room. When an attendant checked him 24 hours later he found no pulse or breathing. A medical officer pronounced him dead, pulled a sheet over his face, and gave orders for his body to be taken to the morgue. But when the attendant came back nine minutes later he thought he detected chest movement, and although his vital signs were still negative he convinced the medical officer to give him a shot of adrenaline into the heart muscle. Ritchie's pulse returned and he started breathing. He regained consciousness four days later. But Ritchie had experienced waking up and seeing the body covered by the sheet. He then felt himself flying over the country, trying to get back to Virginia to continue his training to be a doctor. At one point he came down in a town and tried to ask someone a question, but the man didn't hear or see him. (Ten months afterwards, Ritchie happened to travel through Vicksburg, Mississippi and saw the exact place he had seen during the experience.)

Ritchie wrote of his near-death experience (NDE) in Return from Tomorrow, co-written with Elizabeth Sherrill (1928-2023), and published in 1978. In the book he tells of his out-of-body experience, his meeting with Jesus Christ, and his travel with Christ through different dimensions of time and space. Return from Tomorrow has been translated into nine languages. Later he published another book, Ordered to Return: My Life After Dying, to elaborate on his heavenly experience.

Ritchie's story was the first contact Raymond Moody had with NDEs, during his post-graduate studies and residency in Psychiatry at the University of Virginia. This led Moody to investigate over 150 cases of NDEs in his book Life After Life and two other books that followed.

== Third-Party verification of the Out-of-Body Experience ==
In the opening part of his account, Dr. Ritchie describes an out-of-body experience, including numerous details regarding buildings, places, events, etc., which can be reasonably verified by third parties. Researchers Robert and Suzanne Mays have conducted a thorough investigation of these details contained in Dr. Ritchie's account in order to verify the possible validity of the perceptions described. They found precise correlations and exact matches such as the geographical precision of the trajectory described by Ritchie in his nocturnal out-of-body movement.

In this same context, the Dutch philosopher and psychologist Titus Rivas, in collaboration with other authors, has published The Self Does Not Die: Verified Paranormal Phenomena from Near-Death Experiences, a book that compiles several dozen NDE cases whose development contains elements and details susceptible to third-party verification. The perceptions experienced in these ECM were subsequently verified with thoroughness and rigor by independent persons. These dozens of verified NDE cases would provide empirical support for the authenticity of NDEs, which does not mean that all published NDE cases, which number in the thousands, are necessarily authentic.

However, Dr. Ritchie's NDE case and other verified NDE cases such as those detailed in Titus Rivas's book point toward a solution to the mind-brain problem, an old, large and multifaceted problem which would then be resolved: consciousness would not be produced by the brain, but would pass through the brain.

== Death ==
Ritchie died on October 29, 2007, at his home in Irvington, Virginia, aged 84, following a long battle with cancer.

Death is nothing more than a doorway, something you walk through. − Dr. George Ritchie

== Bibliography ==
- George G. Ritchie and Elizabeth Sherrill, Return from Tomorrow. Old Tappan, NJ: F.H. Revell, 1978. ISBN 0-8007-8412-X.
- George G. Ritchie, Ordered to Return: My Life After Dying. Charlottesville, VA: Hampton Roads Publishing, 1998. ISBN 1-57174-096-1.
