= Jeffrey Long =

American oncologist and author

Jeffrey Long, MD
- Occupations: Author, doctor of medicine
- Writing career
- Period: 20th century
- Genre: Philosophy
- Subject: Near-death experiences
- Website: www.nderf.org

Jeffrey Long is an American author and researcher into the phenomenon of near-death experiences (NDEs). A physician by training, Long practices radiation oncology at a hospital in Kentucky. Long is the author of Evidence of the Afterlife: The Science of Near-Death Experiences, which appeared on The New York Times Best Seller list. In 1998, he founded the Near Death Experience Research Foundation, which is concerned with documenting and researching NDEs.

== Biography ==
Long completed medical school and a residency in radiation oncology at the University of Iowa. Early in his medical career, Long became interested in NDEs after reading a journal article about them. A few years later, the wife of one of his friends told him a detailed story about her experience after her heart stopped while under anesthesia. While working as a physician in Las Vegas, Long was influenced by speakers who had been invited by Raymond Moody, a physician and NDE researcher.

He later practiced medicine in Gallup, New Mexico, before taking a position at the Mary Bird Perkins Cancer Center in Houma, Louisiana, in 2009. He has lived in Kentucky since 2021 and continues to practice his medical specialty of radiation oncology full time. Long established the Near Death Experience Research Foundation (NDERF) in 1998. The foundation maintains a website, also launched in 1998, and a database of more than 5000 cases, which is the world's largest collection of near-death reports. He is on the board of directors of the American Center for the Integration of Spiritually Transformative Experiences (ACISTE).

Long asserts that peace and love are the two words most commonly used by people who describe what they believe to be NDEs. In 2014, the NDERF said that an average of 774 NDEs happened each day in the United States.

Long is the author of the book Evidence of the Afterlife: The Science of Near-Death Experiences, a New York Times Best Seller. He has appeared in many media outlets, including The O'Reilly Factor, NBC Today, ABC (Peter Jennings), Dr. Oz Show, History Channel, Learning Channel, National Geographic and Fox News Houston.

In 2009 Long contributed to The handbook of near-death experiences: thirty years of investigation, published by Praeger. The book is a comprehensive critical review of the research carried out within the field of near-death studies and considered to be a relevant publication in the field.

== Publications ==
- Evidence of the Afterlife: The Science of Near-Death Experiences.
