= Resuscitation (journal) =

- Discipline: Cardiopulmonary Resuscitation
- Language: English
- Edited by: Jerry P. Nolan

Publication details
- Frequency: Monthly
- Impact factor: 4.572 (2018)

Standard abbreviations
- ISO 4: Resuscitation

Indexing
- ISSN: 0300-9572 (print); 1873-1570 (web)

Links
- Journal homepage; Online access; Online archive

Resuscitation is a monthly peer-reviewed medical journal covering research on cardiac arrest and cardiopulmonary resuscitation. It is an official journal of the European Resuscitation Council and is published by Elsevier. The editor-in-chief is Jerry Nolan (University of Southampton). The journal is abstracted and idexed in Current Contents, Index Medicus/MEDLINE/PubMed, Embase, Scopus, and the Science Citation Index Expanded. According to the Journal Citation Reports, the journal has a 2018 impact factor of 4.572.

== See also ==
- List of medical journals
- European Resuscitation Council
