= International Association for Near-Death Studies =

Nonprofit organization

- Abbreviation: IANDS
- Established: 1981 (45 years ago)
- Legal status: 501(c)(3) organization
- Headquarters: Durham
- Website: www.iands.org

The International Association for Near-Death Studies (IANDS) is a nonprofit organization based in Durham, North Carolina in the United States, associated with near-death studies. The Association was founded in the US in 1981, in order to study and provide information on the phenomena of the near death experience (NDE). Today it has grown into an international organization, which includes a network of more than 50 local interest groups, and approximately 1,200 members worldwide. Local chapters, and support groups, are established in major U.S cities. IANDS also supports and assists near-death experiencers (NDErs) and people close to them. In one of its publications the organization has formulated its vision as one of building "global understanding of near-death and near-death-like experiences through research, education, and support".

== History ==
The organization was originally known as the Association for the Scientific Study of Near-Death Phenomena. This group was founded by researchers John Audette, Bruce Greyson, Kenneth Ring and Michael Sabom in 1978. The first president of this association was John Audette, who later served as executive director. In 1981 the organization changed its name to the International Association for Near-Death Studies (also known as IANDS). A headquarter was established in Connecticut, and was affiliated with the University of Connecticut, Storrs. Offices were administered by Nancy Evans Bush, who later served as executive director, and president.

Past presidents of IANDS also include researchers Kenneth Ring and Bruce Greyson, who served as Presidents in the early 1980s. The presidencies of Ring and Greyson (1981–83) marked the beginning of professional research on the topic of NDE's, leading up to the establishment of the Journal of Near-Death Studies in 1982. Greyson later served as director of research at IANDS. During the presidency of John Alexander, in 1984, the organization held its first research conference in Farmington (CT).

Elizabeth Fenske took over the presidency from John Alexander in 1986, and was involved in the relocation of the main office to Philadelphia in the late 1980s. The end of the decade also marked a period of outreach for IANDS. Local branches were established in major U.S cities, and the first national IANDS conference was held at Rosemont College (PA) in 1989. By the early nineties Nancy Evans Bush had taken over as president of the association. In the period from 1992 to 2008 IANDS-offices were administered by external service providers.

In 2008, during the presidency of Diane Corcoran, the organization established its current headquarter in Durham, North Carolina. Later activity includes development of the IANDS website, and continued maintenance of support groups and members.

== Publications and archives ==
IANDS is responsible for the publishing of the Journal of Near-Death Studies, originally known as "Anabiosis". The only scholarly journal in the field of Near-Death Studies. It is peer-reviewed, and is published quarterly.

Another publication is the quarterly newsletter Vital Signs, first published in 1981. The organization also maintains an archive of near-death case histories for research and study.

== Conferences ==
IANDS arranges conferences on the topic of Near-death Experiences. The conferences are held in major U.S cities, almost annually. The first meeting was a medical seminar at Yale University, New Haven (CT) in 1982. This was followed by the first clinical conference in Pembroke Pines (FL), and the first research conference in Farmington (CT) in 1984. Each conference is usually defined by the formulation of a conference theme. In 2004 the conference theme was "Creativity from the light".

The organization also collaborates with academic locations in regard to hosting conferences. In 2001 the IANDS conference was held at Seattle Pacific University. In 2006 IANDS collaborated with University of Texas M.D. Anderson Cancer Center, which became the first medical institution to host the annual IANDS conference. The papers from the conference were later compiled and published in The handbook of near-death experiences: thirty years of investigation

In 2013 the conference was held in Arlington, Virginia, and the theme was "Loss, Grief, and the Discovery of Hope: Stories and Studies from Near-Death Experiences." The 2014 conference was held in Newport Beach (Calif.) and gathered the attention from the newspaper The Epoch Times, which produced several reports from the meeting.

== Other key people ==
=== Nancy Evans Bush ===
Nancy Evans Bush, a former president of IANDS, is an American author, speaker, and researcher best known for her pioneering work on distressing near-death experiences (dNDEs). She brings public attention to NDEs that fall outside the commonly reported narratives of peace and light.

Nancy Evans Bush holds a Bachelor's degree from SUNY-Albany and a Master's degree in Pastoral Ministry and Spirituality from St. Joseph University. Her early career included work as a teacher and later as an administrator for the nonprofit International Association for Near-Death Studies (IANDS), before fully devoting herself to the field of near-death studies.

Bush had her own near-death experience in 1962 during the delivery of her second child, which she later described as distressing and spiritually transformative. In her 2002 article "Afterward: Making Meaning after a Frightening Near-Death Experience," Bush described how her near-death experience during childbirth led to an overwhelming encounter with what she later identified as the 'numinous'—an ineffable and terrifying presence. Rather than receiving comfort or clarity, she faced existential dread and a sense of annihilation.

Bush later connected the emotional aftermath of this experience, which included depression, isolation, and anxiety, to post-traumatic stress, especially due to the lack of cultural or psychological frameworks to help process such an event at the time. She remained silent about the experience for two decades before finding language for it through her work with IANDS.

This experience led her to join the International Association for Near-Death Studies (IANDS), with which she has been affiliated since 1982, eventually serving as its President. She was first hired to run the organization's early office at the University of Connecticut, where she began integrating her personal story with the emerging literature of near-death studies. Over time, she earned most of a Master’s degree in clinical psychology and completed her graduate work in Pastoral Ministry and Spirituality.

Her work focused on the lesser-known category of distressing NDEs, challenging the widespread assumption that all NDEs are positive. Through decades of research, writing, and speaking engagements, she emphasized that frightening or void-like experiences can also lead to profound personal and spiritual growth. Her contributions helped shape a broader, more inclusive understanding of the near-death experience phenomenon.

In her co-authored 2014 article with Bruce Greyson in Missouri Medicine, Bush identified three principal categories of distressing NDEs: inverse, void, and hellish experiences—each with distinct features and implications. She also explored the clinical, psychological, and spiritual impacts of these experiences on individuals over the long term.

In her 2002 article "Afterward: Making Meaning after a Frightening Near-Death Experience," Bush proposed a model for meaning-making among survivors of terrifying NDEs, categorizing their responses as either redemptive, reductionist, or long-term existential questioning.

==== Publications ====
Bush is the author of:

- Bush, Nancy Evans; Greyson, Bruce (2020). Dancing Past the Dark: Distressing Near-Death Experiences. Nancy Evans Bush. ISBN 978-0985191726.
- Bush, Nancy Evans (2016). The Buddha in Hell and Other Alarms: Distressing Near-Death Experiences in Perspective. Nancy Evans Bush. ISBN 978-0985191719.
- Bush, Nancy Evans (2021). Reckoning: Discoveries after a Traumatic Near-Death Experience. Nancy Evans Bush. ISBN 978-0985191733.

In a 2020 personal reflection published in Perspectives in Biology and Medicine, Bush described the psychological aftereffects of her NDE, including existential depression, spiritual trauma, and the slow healing process through community and research.
