= Pim van Lommel =

Dutch cardiologist (born 1943)

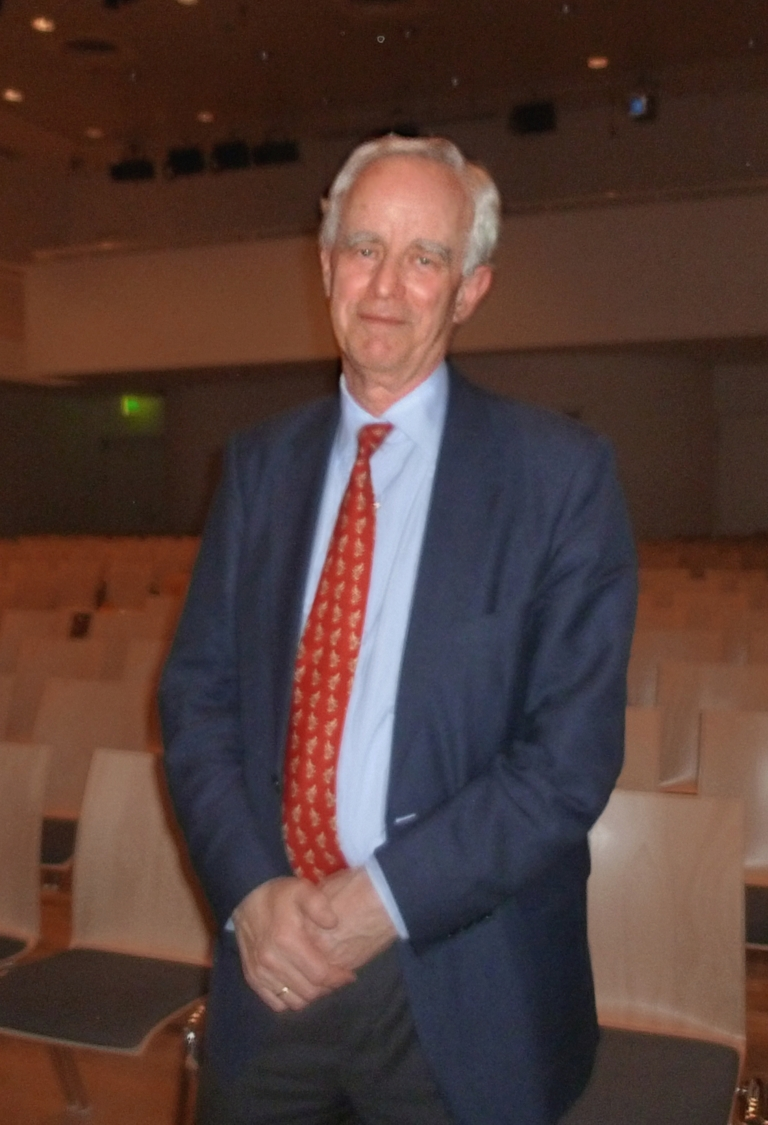
- Pim van Lommel in 2012
- Born: Pim van Lommel; 15 March 1943 (age 83); Laren, North Holland
- Education: Utrecht University
- Known for: Near-death experiences
- Scientific career
- Fields: Cardiology
- Workplaces: Rijnstate Hospital

Pim van Lommel (born 15 March 1943) is a Dutch cardiologist, author and researcher in the field of near-death studies.

== Education and career ==
He studied medicine at Utrecht University, specializing in cardiology. He worked as a cardiologist at the Rijnstate Hospital, Arnhem, for 26 years (1977-2003). In 1988 he launched a prospective study of near-death experiences that spanned 10 Dutch hospitals. 344 survivors of cardiac arrest were included in the study. In 2001, his large-scaled prospective study of near-death experiences after cardiac arrest was published in the medical journal The Lancet. In 2007, the first (Dutch) edition of his bestseller Consciousness Beyond Life: The Science of the Near-Death Experience, was published.

== Reception ==
Neurobiologist Dick Swaab praised van Lommel's research for mapping patients’ experiences and opening up the subject of near-death experiences (NDEs) to the medical world. But he also claimed that Lommel's book ignores scientific knowledge, including some conclusions from his own research. He further argued that van Lommel does not refute neurobiological explanations, gives no scientific basis for his statements and borrows concepts from quantum physics without ground (quantum mysticism). According to Swaab, Van Lommel deviates from the scientific approach and Consciousness Beyond Life can only be categorized as pseudoscientific.

Jason Braithwaite, a senior lecturer in Cognitive Neuroscience in the Behavioural Brain Sciences Centre, University of Birmingham, issued an in-depth analysis and critique of van Lommel's prospective study published in the medical journal The Lancet, concluding that while Lommel's et al. study makes a useful contribution, it contains several factual and logical errors. Among these errors are van Lommel's misunderstandings and misinterpretations of the dying-brain hypothesis, misunderstandings over the role of anoxia, misplaced confidence in EEG measurements (a flat electroencephalogram (EEG) reading is not evidence of total brain inactivity), etc. Jason concluded with, "it is difficult to see what one could learn from the paranormal survivalist position which sets out assuming the truth of that which it seeks to establish, makes additional and unnecessary assumptions, misrepresents the current state of knowledge from mainstream science, and appears less than comprehensive in its analysis of the available facts."

In his book van Lommel also supported alleged psychic abilities of some NDErs. In a review, skeptic Donna Harris wrote the research was unreliable as it was taken from self-reported surveys and interviews and "since any type of paranormal or intuitive power remains unproven, it is troubling that the author doesn’t question these abilities, and just includes them as accepted facts."

== Publications ==
- Van Lommel, P., van Wees, R., Meyers, V. and Elfferich, I. (2001) Near-death experience in survivors of cardiac arrest: a prospective study in the Netherlands. Lancet 358: 2039-2045.
- Van Lommel, P. (2004). About the continuity of our consciousness. Advances in Experimental Medicine and Biology 550: 115-132.
- Van Lommel, P. (2006). Near-Death Experience, Consciousness and the Brain. A new concept about the continuity of our consciousness based on recent scientific research on near-death experience in survivors of cardiac arrest. World Futures, The Journal of General Evolution 62: 134-152.
- Consciousness Beyond Life: The Science of the Near-Death Experience (2010, 2011)
- Van Lommel, P. (2011). Near-death experiences: the experience of the self as real and not as an illusion. Annals of the New York Academy of Sciences 1234: 19-28.
- Van Lommel, P. (2013). Nonlocal Consciousness. A concept based on scientific research on near-death experiences during cardiac arrest. Journal of Consciousness Studies 20: 7-48.
