= Michael Sabom =

American cardiologist and near-death experience researcher

Michael B. Sabom is an American cardiologist, confessing Christian and near-death experience researcher.

== Education ==
Sabom attended Colorado College, graduating in 1966. He completed his medical education at the University of Texas Medical Branch in 1970. He completed his cardiology training at the University of Florida in 1978.

== Career ==
After finishing his training, Sabom spent a few years as an assistant professor of cardiology at Emory University before moving into private practice. He retired from private practice in 2017.

Sabom is known for his work on near-death experiences. He is a founding member of the International Association for Near Death Studies.

Sabom has written two books about near-death experiences. The first book, Recollections of Death: A Medical Investigation, was released in 1982. Sabom presented interviews with 116 people who had experienced a near-death crisis, which he discusses and classifies. This book was positively received for providing a relatively objective and medicine-based point of view, though one reviewer speculated that the "author's wish to believe may have colored his analysis." It has been cited over 800 times in scholarly works, according to Google Scholar.

The second book, Light and Death, was released in 1998. Similarly to the first book, Sabom interviews 160 patients following near-death crises. Although it still retained some medical and scientific aspects, this book was written from a more religious (Christian) viewpoint. The book is notable for describing the Pam Reynolds case, a case of a near-death experience that has received some media attention, and which Sabom investigated. This work (particularly that involving Pam Reynolds) has been criticized by the author Sam Harris for possible experimenter bias, unconscious witness tampering and false memories.

An interview with Sabom was featured in the 2023 film After Death.

== Publications ==
- Sabom, Michael (1982). Recollections of Death: A Medical Investigation. New York: Harper & Row. ISBN 0-06-014895-0. OCLC 7575459.
- Sabom, Michael (1998). Light & Death: One Doctor's Fascinating Account of Near-Death Experiences. Grand Rapids, Mich: Zondervan. ISBN 978-0-310-21992-7. OCLC 39756347.
