= Life After Life (Moody book) =

1975 book by Raymond Moody

Life After Life: The Investigation of a Phenomenon—Survival of Bodily Death
- First edition
- Author: Raymond A. Moody
- Publisher: Mockingbird Books
- Publication date: 1975
- Media type: Print
- Pages: 175
- ISBN: 978-0-89176-037-5
- OCLC: 12173853

Life After Life is a 1975 book written by psychiatrist Raymond Moody. It is a report on a qualitative study in which Moody interviewed 150 people who had undergone near-death experiences (NDEs). The book presents the author's composite account of what it is like to die, supplemented with individual accounts. On the basis of his collection of cases, Moody identified a common set of elements in NDEs:

- (a) an overwhelming feeling of peace and well-being, including freedom from pain.
- (b) the impression of being located outside one's physical body.
- (c) floating or drifting through darkness, sometimes described as a tunnel.
- (d) becoming aware of a golden light.
- (e) encountering and perhaps communicating with a "being of light".
- (f) having a rapid succession of visual images of one's past.
- (g) experiencing another world of much beauty.

Life After Life sold more than 13 million copies, was translated into a dozen foreign languages and became an international best seller, which made the subject of NDEs popular and opened the way for many other studies.

== Reception ==
Moody's alleged evidence for an afterlife was heavily criticized as flawed, both logically and empirically. The psychologist and skeptic James Alcock has noted that "[Moody] appears to ignore a great deal of the scientific literature dealing with hallucinatory experiences in general, just as he quickly glosses over the very real limitations of his research method."

The philosopher and skeptic Paul Kurtz has written that Moody's evidence for the NDE is based on personal interviews and anecdotal accounts and there has been no statistical analyses of his data. According to Kurtz, "there is no reliable evidence that people who report such experiences have died and returned, or that consciousness exists separate from the brain or body."
