= Kenneth Ring =

American psychologist

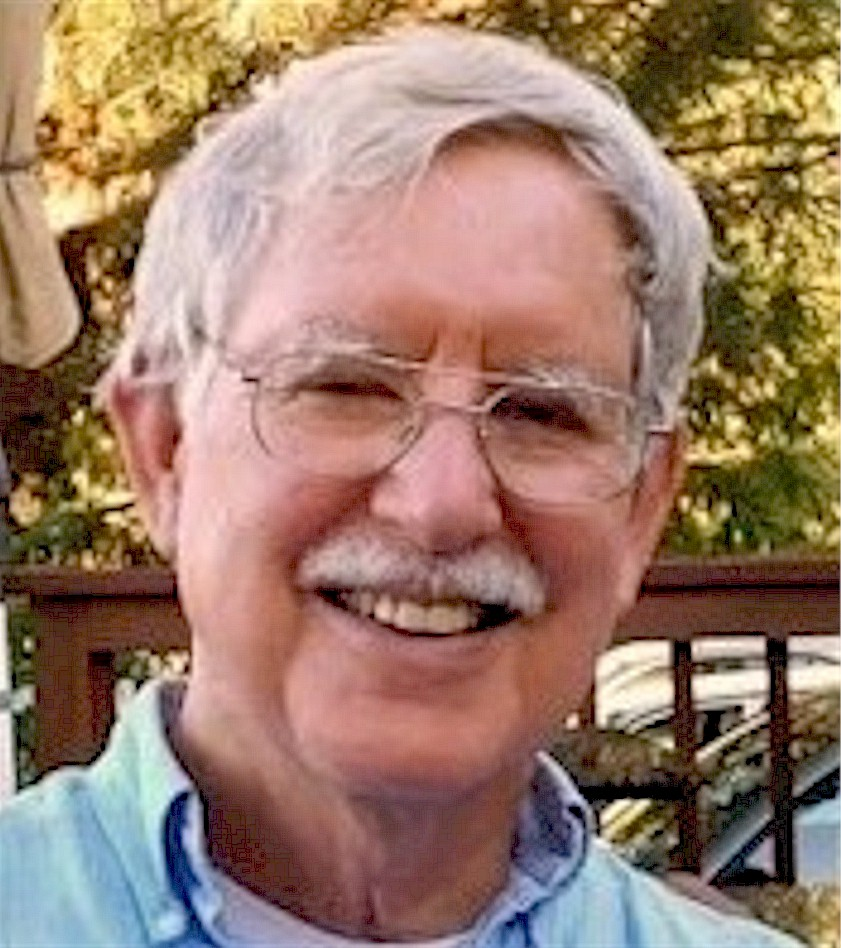
- Ring in 2019
- Born: 13 December 1935 (age 90); San Francisco, California, U.S.
- Occupation: Psychologist

Kenneth Ring (born December 13, 1935) is an American psychologist, born in San Francisco, California. He is the co-founder and past president of the International Association for Near-Death Studies (IANDS) and is the founding editor of the Journal of Near-Death Studies. He currently lives in Kentfield, California.

== Biography ==
Among his first publications was the book Methods of Madness: The Mental Hospital as a Last Resort. The book was released in 1969 and was co-authored with Benjamin Braginsky and Dorothea Braginsky. Ring's book Life at Death was published by William Morrow and Company in 1980. In this book Ring presented the Weighted Core Experience Index, a psychometric instrument constructed to measure the depth of a near-death experience. In 1984, the company published Ring's second book, Heading Toward Omega. Both books deal with near-death experiences and how they change people's lives.

In 1992 he published The Omega Project: Human Evolution in an Ecological Age, a book that dealt with near-death experiences and UFO-encounters. 1998 saw the release of Lessons From the Light. What We Can Learn From the Near-Death Experience, co-authored with Evelyn Elaesser. The book discussed a wide range of paranormal phenomena, including out-of-body experiences, children's near-death experiences, near-death experiences in the blind, as well as healing and paranormal abilities in near-death experiencers. Another co-authored release appeared in 1999. This time Ring co-operated with Sharon Cooper for the release of Mindsight: Near-death and out-of-body experiences in the blind. In the book Ring & Cooper discussed the possibility of sight and vision among blind near-death experiencers.

In November 2008, Ring visited Israel as part of a peace delegation and subsequently protested the Israeli air strikes on the Gaza Strip as completely disproportionate. Kenneth Ring also is a co-author of Letters from Palestine (2011).
