= Raymond Moody =

American psychologist and philosopher (born 1944)

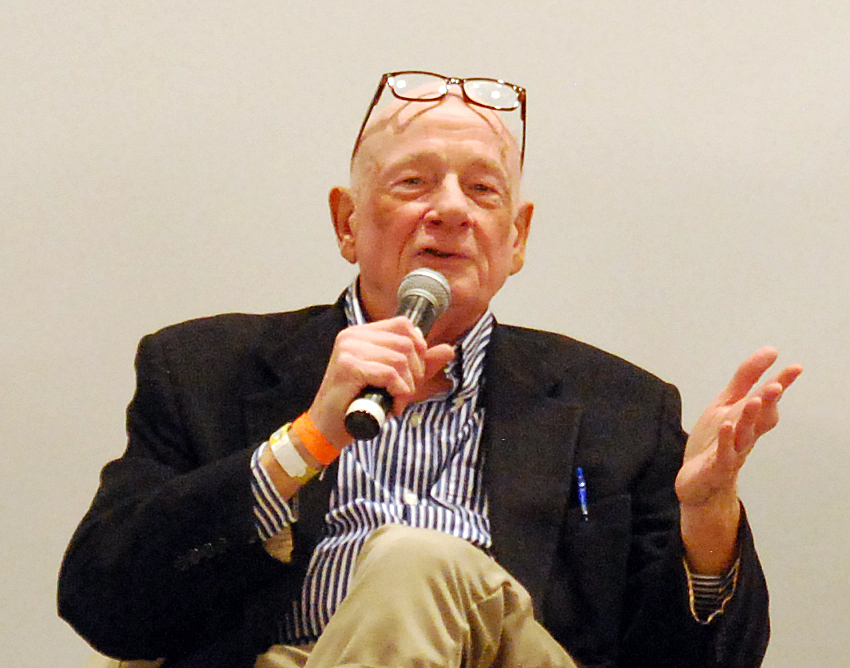
- Born: June 30, 1944 (age 82); Porterdale, Georgia, U.S.
- Education: University of Virginia (BA, M.A., PhD); West Georgia College (PhD); Medical College of Georgia (M.D.)
- Occupations: Author, physician, researcher
- Writing career
- Period: 20th century
- Genre: Consciousness
- Subject: Near-death experiences
- Website: www.lifeafterlife.com

Raymond A. Moody Jr. (born June 30, 1944) is an American philosopher, psychiatrist, and author, most widely known for his books about afterlife and near-death experiences (NDE), a term that he coined in 1975 in his best-selling book Life After Life. His research explores personal accounts of subjective phenomena encountered in near-death experiences, particularly those of people who have apparently died but been resuscitated. He has widely published his views on what he terms near-death-experience psychology.

== Early life and education ==
Moody was born in Porterdale, Georgia, the son of an agnostic surgeon. He earned a BA (1966), an M.A. (1967), and a PhD (1969) in philosophy from the University of Virginia. He also earned a PhD in psychology from the University of West Georgia, then known as West Georgia College, where he later became a professor in the topic. In 1976, he earned an M.D. from the Medical College of Georgia.

== Career ==
=== Early career ===
After obtaining his M.D., Moody worked as a forensic psychiatrist in a maximum-security Georgia state hospital. In 1998, Moody was appointed chair in Consciousness Studies at the University of Nevada, Las Vegas.

=== Near-death research ===
While an undergraduate at the University of Virginia in 1965, Moody encountered psychiatrist, Dr. George Ritchie, who told Moody about an incident in which he believed he had journeyed into the afterlife while dead for nearly nine minutes at the age of 20 (which Ritchie would later recount in his book, Return From Tomorrow, published in 1978). Moody began documenting similar accounts by other people who had experienced clinical death and discovered that many of these experiences shared common features, such as the feeling of being out of one's body, the sensation of traveling through a tunnel, encountering dead relatives, and encountering a bright light. In 1975, Moody published many of these experiences in his book, Life After Life, in which he coined the term "near-death experience". The first edition carried a foreword by the psychiatrist Elisabeth Kübler-Ross, author of On Death and Dying (1969).

In an interview with Jeffrey Mishlove, Moody shared his personal conclusions about his research into near-death experiences:

I don't mind saying that after talking with over a thousand people who have had these experiences, and having experienced many times some of the really baffling and unusual features of these experiences, it has given me great confidence that there is a life after death. As a matter of fact, I must confess to you in all honesty, I have absolutely no doubt, on the basis of what my patients have told me, that they did get a glimpse of the beyond.

=== Later research ===
Inspired by the Greek psychomanteums where the ancient Greeks would go to consult the apparitions of the dead (which Moody had read about in classic Greek texts that he encountered while a student at the University of Virginia), Moody built a psychomanteum in Alabama, which he calls the Dr. John Dee Theater of the Mind. By staring into a mirror in a dimly lit room, Moody claims that people are able to summon visions of spiritual apparitions (see mirror gazing).

Moody has also researched past life regression via hypnosis.

In 2023, Moody coauthored Proof of Life After Life: 7 Reasons to Believe There Is an Afterlife with Paul Perry with whom he has coauthored seven books. Drawing on nearly sixty years of research, the book presents case studies, expert interviews, and theoretical insights to argue that consciousness survives bodily death. It expands beyond near-death experiences to explore shared-death experiences, paranormal signs, and broader questions about the soul and afterlife.

Moody serves as a Consulting Researcher at the Institute for the Scientific Study of Consciousness (ISSC), where he continues to contribute to research on near-death experiences and consciousness studies.

In 2025, the International Association for Near-Death Studies (IANDS) announced its annual conference will be titled Life After Life: Celebrating the Golden Anniversary of Near-Death Studies, in honor of the 50th anniversary of Moody's groundbreaking 1975 book Life After Life.

== Criticism of Moody's near-death research ==
Barry Beyerstein, a professor of psychology, has written that Moody's alleged evidence for an afterlife is flawed, both logically and empirically. The psychologist James Alcock has noted that Moody "... appears to ignore a great deal of the scientific literature dealing with hallucinatory experiences in general, just as he quickly glosses over the very real limitations of his research method."

Moody has been described as a "strong personal believer" in the paranormal. His methods have drawn criticism from the scientific community as many of the personal reports he collected on near-death experiences (NDEs) were given by the patients themselves, months and even years after the event. Terence Hines commented "such reports are hardly sufficient to argue for the reality of an afterlife."

The philosopher Paul Kurtz has written that Moody's evidence for the NDE is based on personal interviews and anecdotal accounts and there has been no statistical analysis of his data. There also is the question of interpreting such data as has been published assuming that the factual matter is objectively correct; according to Kurtz, "there is no reliable evidence that people who report such experiences have died and returned, or that consciousness exists separate from the brain or body."

The philosopher Robert Todd Carroll has written that a characteristic of Moody's work is the omission of cases that do not fit his hypothesis, confirming the aspect of cherry picking. Carroll writes that what Moody describes as a typical NDE may be due to brain states triggered by cardiac arrest and anesthesia. Moody believes NDEs are evidence for an afterlife but Carroll states they can be explained by neurochemistry and are the result of a "dying, demented or drugged brain."

== Personal life ==
Moody says he had a near-death experience in 1991 when he attempted suicide (which he talks about in his book Paranormal) which he says was the result of an undiagnosed thyroid condition which affected his mental state. In an interview in 1993, Moody stated he was placed in a mental hospital by his family for his work with mirror gazing.

== Bibliography ==
- Raymond Moody, Life After Life: the investigation of a phenomenon – survival of bodily death, San Francisco, CA: HarperSanFrancisco, 2001. ISBN 0-06-251739-2.
- Raymond Moody, Reflections on Life After Life, Harrisburg, PA: Stackpole Books, 1977. ISBN 978-0-8117-1423-5.
- Raymond Moody and Paul Perry, The Light Beyond, New York, NY: Bantam Books, 1988. ISBN 0-553-05285-3.
- Raymond Moody and Paul Perry, Life Before Life: Regression into Past Lives, Pan Books, 1991 ISBN 0-330-31725-3.
- Raymond Moody and Paul Perry, Glimpses of Eternity: Sharing a loved one's passage from this life to the next, New York, NY: Guideposts, 2010. ISBN 0-8249-4813-0.
- Raymond Moody and Paul Perry, Paranormal: My Life in Pursuit of the Afterlife, New York, NY: HarperOne, 2013. ISBN 0-062-04643-8.
- Raymond Moody and Paul Perry, Reunions: visionary encounters with departed loved ones, New York, NY: Villard Books, 1993. ISBN 0-679-42570-5.
- Raymond Moody and Dianne Arcangel, Life After Loss: conquering grief and finding hope, San Francisco : HarperSanFrancisco, 2001. ISBN 0-06-251729-5.
- Raymond Moody and Paul Perry, Coming Back: a psychiatrist explores past life journeys, New York, NY: Bantam Books, 1991. ISBN 0-553-07059-2.
- Raymond Moody, Laugh after laugh: the healing power of humor, Jacksonville, FL: Headwaters Press, 1978. ISBN 0-932428-07-X.
- Raymond Moody, The Last Laugh: a new philosophy of near-death experiences, apparitions, and the paranormal, Charlottesville, VA: Hampton Roads Pub., 1999. ISBN 1-57174-106-2.
- Raymond Moody, Elvis After Life: Unusual psychic experiences surrounding the death of a superstar, New York, NY: Mass Market Paperback, Bantam Books, July 1, 1989. ISBN 0-553-27345-0.
- Raymond D. Moody, Making Sense of Nonsense: The Logical Bridge Between Science & Spirituality, Woodbury, Minnesota, Llewellyn 2020 Paperback ISBN 9780738763163
- Raymond Moody, God Is Bigger Than the Bible, we are God's stories, independently published, March 2021 ISBN 979-8719383743
- Raymond Moody and Paul Perry, Proof of Life After Life: 7 Reasons to Believe There Is an Afterlife. Atria Books/Beyond Words, 2023. ISBN 9781582708850.
