= Near-death experience =

Personal experiences associated with death or impending death

A near-death experience (NDE) is a profound personal experience associated with death or impending death, which researchers describe as having similar characteristics. When positive, which most, but not all reported experiences are, such experiences may encompass a variety of sensations including detachment from the body, feelings of levitation, total serenity, security, warmth, joy, the experience of absolute dissolution, review of major life events, the presence of a light, and seeing dead relatives. While there are common elements, people's experiences and their interpretations of these experiences generally reflect their cultural, philosophical, or religious beliefs.

NDEs usually occur during temporary clinical death. Explanations for NDEs vary from scientific to religious. Neuroscience research hypothesizes that an NDE is a subjective phenomenon resulting from "disturbed bodily multisensory integration" that occurs during life-threatening events. Some transcendental and religious beliefs about an afterlife include descriptions similar to NDEs.

== Etymology ==
The equivalent French term expérience de mort imminente ("experience of imminent death") was proposed by French psychologist and epistemologist Victor Egger as a result of discussions in the 1890s among philosophers and psychologists concerning climbers' stories of the panoramic life review during falls. In 1892, a series of subjective observations by workers falling from scaffolds, soldiers who suffered injuries, climbers who had fallen from heights and other individuals who had come close to death such as in near drownings and accidents was reported by Albert Heim. This was also the first time the phenomenon was described as a clinical syndrome.

In 1968, Celia Green published an analysis of 400 first-hand accounts of out-of-body experiences. This represented the first attempt to provide a taxonomy of such experiences, viewed simply as anomalous perceptual experiences or hallucinations. In 1969, Swiss-American psychiatrist and pioneer in near-death studies Elisabeth Kübler-Ross published her well-known book On Death and Dying: What the Dying Have to Teach Doctors, Nurses, Clergy, and Their Own Families. The term "near-death experience" was used by John C. Lilly in 1972. The term was popularized in 1975 by the work of psychiatrist Raymond Moody, who used it as an umbrella term for out-of-body experiences (OBEs), the "panoramic life review", the Light, the tunnel, or the border.

== Characteristics ==
=== Elements according to Moody (1975, close to death or death experiences) ===
A 1975 study conducted by psychiatrist Raymond Moody on around 150 patients who all claimed to have witnessed an NDE stated that such an experience has fifteen elements. Moody focused in depth on approximately 50 cases from the group. One of the unifying aspects of all these patients' experiences was that they had suffered from critical illness, experienced life-threatening conditions or died. Eleven of the fifteen elements pertain to the experience itself and include:

1. Finding it challenging to express the experience in one's own words.
2. Learning one is dead from spectators or doctors.
3. One's pain is replaced by pleasant sensations or/and feelings of peace.
4. Hearing a disturbing noise or pleasant unearthly music.
5. Travelling through a dark tunnel.
6. Finding oneself outside the body.
7. Meeting other people.
8. Meeting with a being of light.
9. Panoramic review of one's life.
10. Arriving at boundary, frontier or point of no return.
11. Returning to one's body and earthly life.

Moody then described four more elements that relate to events occurring after the experience:

1. Sharing the experience with other people.
2. Impact on one's life.
3. Changing one's view of death.
4. Corroboration of the experience.

Moody explained how not every NDE will have each and every one of these steps, and how it could be different for each experience.

=== Elements according to Ring (1980) ===
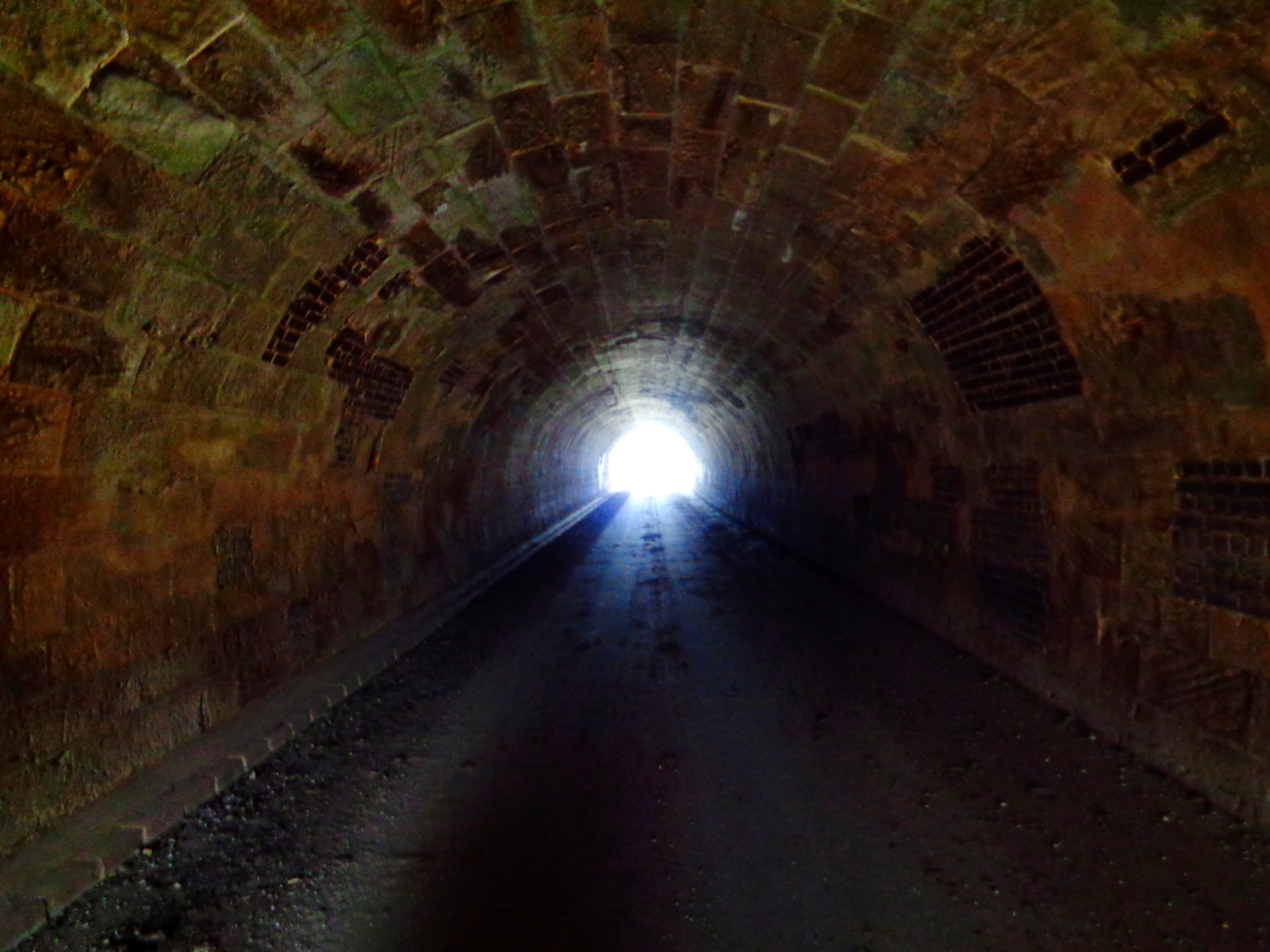
Entering darkness, seeing the light

Kenneth Ring (1980) simplified Moody's observations and subdivided the NDE on a five-stage continuum (using Moody's 15 elements as inspiration). The subdivisions were:

1. Peace
2. Body separation
3. Entering darkness
4. Seeing the light
5. Entering another realm of existence, through the light

The final stage is the person being resuscitated.

=== Common elements (2022 guidelines – close to death or death) ===
Since patient populations studied since Moody's original publication have drifted away from the original definition of NDEs—and thus from pathophysiological states resulting from critical illness, death, closeness to death—it has become challenging to compare peer reviewed publications where patients have diverse medical and non-medical conditions. Recent guidelines have addressed the challenge by proposing to make a clear distinction between patient groups having experienced an authentic near-death experience, as in Moody's original publication, from other experiences (medical and non-medical). To better identify patients' populations, the guidelines stress the importance of studying patients whose experiences follow the narrative arc of Moody's original transcendent experiences:

1. A relation with death.
2. A sensation of surpassing the physical or material world.
3. Ineffability.
4. Beneficial life changes tied to a deeper sense of meaning and purpose.

The guidelines also recommend to focus on experiences where:

- the severity of illness leads to loss of consciousness (LOC); and
- there are no signs of the usual coma-associated phenomena like typical dreams, delirium, or delusional thinking, regardless of whether the person was in the ICU or a different environment.

The last two points are important:

- to appropriately identify death-related experiences;
- to exclude coma-related critical illness/life threatening; and
- to exclude diverse non-death related human experiences.

2022 guidelines
Separation
1	Detaching from the physical body
2	Unexpected mental clarity
3	Initial disorientation
4	Realizing one's own death
5	Feeling freed and light as air
6	Visual perception: viewing the scene or body from above
7	Panoramic vision: felt capable of seeing in every direction
8	Emotional distance from earthly events
9	Core sense of "self" persists
10	Releasing the physical form
11	Connected via an energetic "thread"
12	Suspended or drifting in space
Heading to a place
13	Being pulled toward a certain place
14	Passing through or seeing a tunnel
Life playback: actions and motives are important
15	Life playback: every thought, action, and motive is important
16	The inexpressible: encounter with a radiant, loving, and ideal presence
17	Not measuring up: evaluating my real human value
18	Revisiting life events: reliving each experience
19	Empathy through others' eyes: understanding their perspective
20	Brief glimpse into both past and distant past
21	Ripple effect: understanding the chain reactions of my actions
22	The value of dignity: leading a life practicing ethics and morality
23	Everything has a cause: the principle of cause and effect
24	Regret and humility: recognizing I could have done better
25	Learning opportunity: the urge to grow as a person
26	A greater calling: wishing I had understood life's true purpose
"Home" again
27	Coming back to a familiar place called "home"
28	Time functions differently
29	An environment filled with knowledge, goodness, gentleness, and truth
30	Receiving guidance or help
31	Meeting beings or experiencing themselves as light or images varying in intensity and magnitude
32	Communication through thought alone
33	Letting go of earthly attachments
34	Sudden acquisition of vast knowledge
35	Earthly life felt unreal: this was much more authentic
36	Existence of hierarchies that correspond to different levels of understanding
37	My hierarchical level depends on my wisdom and understanding
Coming back
38	Connection to a primary source or origin
39	Approaching an irreversible threshold
40	Strong desire to remain
41	Obligation to return
42	Sensory impressions during the return
43	Recognition of a personal life purpose
Effects after living the event
44	Hard to put into words
45	Forgetting significant amounts of information
46	A positive event despite mistakes
47	Difficulties in interpreting the experience personally
48	A renewed quest for life's purpose and meaning
49	Diminished fear of dying
50	Reevaluating the role of struggles in life
51	Lasting beneficial impact

=== Common elements in mislabeled NDEs (patients not facing impending death or death) ===
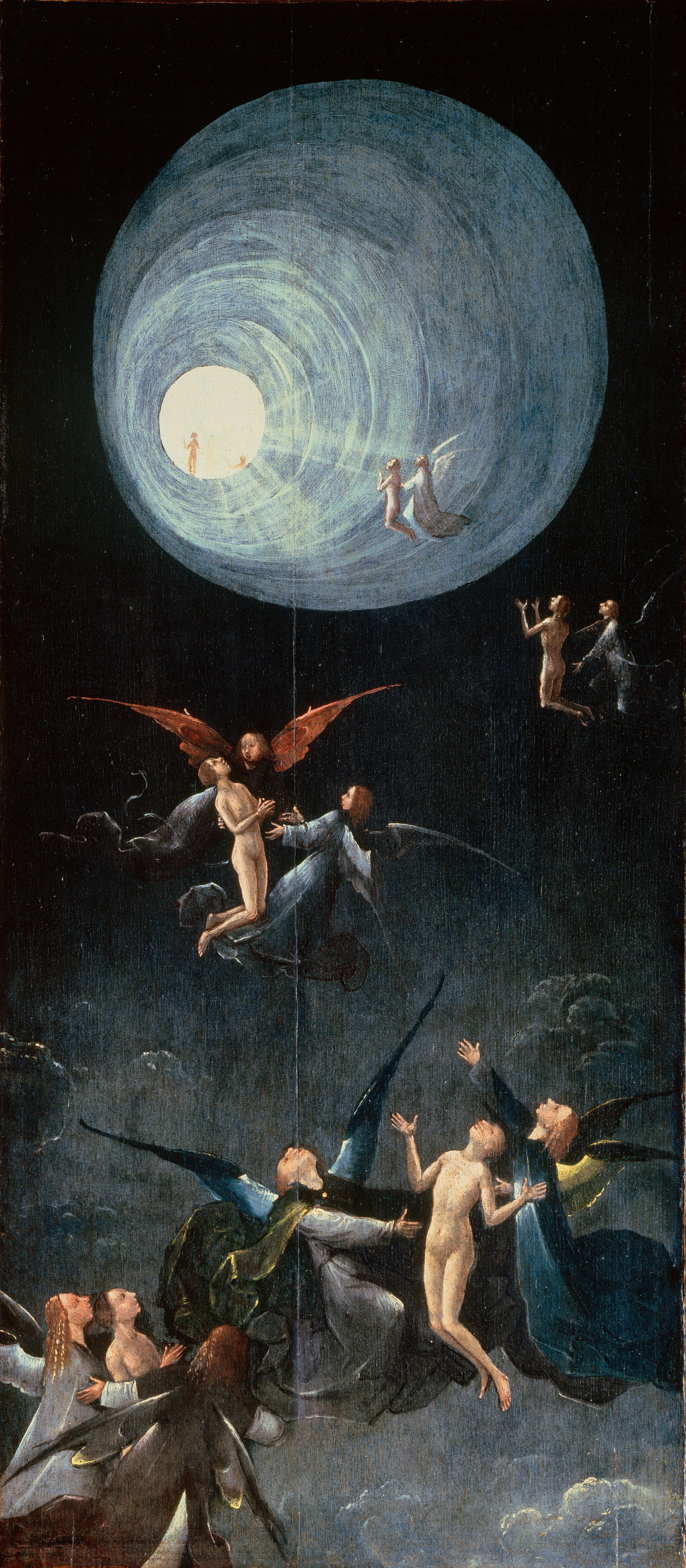
Ascent of the Blessed by Hieronymus Bosch is associated by some NDE researchers with aspects of the NDE.

Due to a poor definition of what being "near-death" means, over the years researchers have drifted away from studying the same populations as Moody where patients suffered from critical illness, cardiac arrest or were in life critical-conditions. For example, in one series, 22% of the mislabeled NDEs have been claimed to occur during general anesthesia. There is disagreement between the 2022 guidelines and another author about the existence of some common elements or not:

- Classical (or authentic) near-death experiences occurring in populations facing impending death or death; and
- mislabeled NDEs occurring in populations not facing impending death or death.

==== Assertions of phenomenological diversity ====
The 2022 guidelines stress that the themes of authentic death experiences have little in common with mislabeled NDEs, except perhaps for shallow similarities, like mentioning religious symbols or saying the experience felt peaceful. The physiological context of patients near-death or experiencing death (as defined by cardiopulmonary criteria) leads to a decline in mental clarity and consciousness and, in extreme cases, complete loss of detectable cerebral function. Paradoxically, genuine/authentic near death experiences—characterized by coherence, meaning, purpose, and lucid life review—arise during this state, not under normal conditions of preserved brain metabolism and function. According to the 2022 guidelines, experiences termed "NDE-like" including those induced by ketamine or DMT, reliably display features unlike recalled experiences of death:

- distorted body sensations,
- inflated or self-centered perspectives, and
- varied imagery such as elves, celebrities, geometric forms, aliens, or bright neon scenes.

Likewise, dreams and seizures exhibit unrelated, non-authentic NDE themes.

==== Claims of common elements ====
Another author instead claims that similar traits have been identified despite the differences among populations being studied and these include:

- 50% awareness of being dead.
- 56% a sense of peace, well-being, painlessness, bliss, euphoria and other positive emotions.
- 24% an out-of-body experience (OBE). An OBE may be part of an NDE and involves a perception of one's body from an outside position, sometimes observing medical professionals performing resuscitation efforts.
- 31% a "tunnel experience" or entering a darkness. A sense of moving up, or through, a passageway or staircase.
- 32% being reunited with deceased loved ones or seeing religious figures.

=== Interpretation of NDEs ===
A person's interpretation of an NDE experience often corresponds with one's cultural, philosophical, or religious beliefs. For example, in the US, where 46% of the population believes in guardian angels, the Light will often be identified as angels or deceased loved ones (or will be unidentified), while Hindus will often identify them as messengers of the god of death. The cultural beliefs held by NDErs seem to dictate some of the phenomena experienced during the NDE, but more so affect the later interpretation thereof.

=== Negative NDEs or ICU delirium and delusions ===
In the years following Moody's descriptions of classical near-death experiences, reports of unpleasant experiences where people felt persecuted, distressed or frightened began to appear in the literature and in the media. These NDEs were categorized as negative or "hellish" (NDEs). More recent research, indicates that these distressing experiences generally do not share the same narrative structure or thematic elements as classical NDEs, nor do they exhibit the same long-term transformative impact, transcendent characteristics and ineffability. In essence, negative NDEs appear to be fundamentally and phenomenologically distinct from classical NDEs. In fact, most of these accounts are better understood as mislabelings of ICU delirium and delusions—phenomena that are well documented in the literature, particularly in the context of toxic metabolic disturbances, withdrawal syndromes, and other conditions that can produce persecutory, frightening, or dream-like experiences in hospitalized and critically ill patients. The original misclassification of these experiences lacked specific criteria or a scientific basis, and no formal definition or consensus has ever been established. Nevertheless, the use of these terms has contributed to the propagation of the idea of negative or "hellish" death-related experiences in the media and beyond.

=== NDEs and suicides ===
Those who attempt suicide and survive will sometimes report enduring intense emotional pain that feels, to them, like a torment of their own creation. These individuals often find themselves in a state that they perceive as a personal and self-created hell.

=== Bruce Greyson scale and false positives ===
To improve diagnosis of NDEs, Bruce Greyson created a questionnaire for NDErs, composed of 80 characteristics. The questionnaire studies common effects, mechanisms, sensations and reactions. Greyson replaced that questionnaire in 1983 with a scale for researchers to use. Nearly four decades after the development of the standardized Greyson NDE scale, several limitations have come to light. Notably, many of the terms and questions used (in the Greyson scale) — interpreted literally by the public — lack the precision to reliably distinguish true NDEs from other different kinds of human experiences. For instance, Greyson's scale includes vague terms like "strange bodily sensations", "unearthly place", "mystical feelings", "joy", "harmony", "pleasantness", and "spirits", which could apply to a variety of non-NDE experiences. The term "unearthly", for example, could easily describe anything from a stunning vacation setting to the altered state brought on by drugs. Because this scale was developed without a clear definition of what it means to be "near death". it failed to include criteria that tie the experience to a real life-threatening event. As a result, using the scale outside its intended context can lead to false positives. For example, someone recalling a peaceful vacation and reflecting on life might meet several of the scale's criteria—such as peace, harmony, an unearthly place, and life review—leading to the incorrect labeling of the event as an NDE. Researchers must be cautious of such misclassifications.

=== Patients' management and after-effects ===
Moody described the correct approach to an NDE patient is to "Ask, Listen, Validate, Educate, and Refer". Due to the potential confusion or shock attributed to those who experience near-death experiences, it is important to treat them in a calm and understanding way right after their return from the NDE. NDEs are associated with changes in personality and outlook on life. Ring has identified a consistent set of value and belief changes associated with people who have had an NDE. Among these changes, he found a greater appreciation for life, higher self-esteem, greater compassion for others, less concern for acquiring material wealth, a heightened sense of purpose and self-understanding, desire to learn, elevated spirituality, greater ecological sensitivity and planetary concern, a feeling of being more intuitive, no longer worrying about death, and claiming to have witnessed an afterlife. Although people who have experienced NDEs become more spiritual, it does not mean they become necessarily more religious. Not all after-effects are beneficial, and Greyson describes circumstances in which changes in attitudes and behavior can lead to psychosocial and psychospiritual problems.

== Establishment of research framework ==
To establish a rigorous research framework for the study of experiences of encounters with death, the 2022 guidelines agreed to adopt the more precise term recalled experience of death (RED) instead of near-death experience (NDE). A RED is an authentic near-death experience (see Common Elements, 2022 Guidelines). Hence, a RED refers to a distinct cognitive and emotional event that takes place during a period of loss of consciousness associated with a life-threatening episode, such as cardiac arrest. REDs, just like authentic near-death experiences, follow the narrative arc of Moody's original transcendent experiences:

1. A relation with death.
2. A sensation of surpassing the physical or material world
3. Ineffability
4. Beneficial life changes tied to a deeper sense of meaning and purpose.

REDs do not feature signs of the usual coma-associated phenomena like typical dreams, delirium, or delusional thinking. The term RED eliminates the vagueness of "near-death" by including both severe, life-threatening conditions that bring a person close to death (from a medical or pathophysiological standpoint) and states involving the actual physiological processes of death itself, such as cardiac arrest or other forms of cardiac standstill. The authors of the 2022 guidelines believe that focusing on REDs will provide a more robust research framework. Studies of REDs will avoid mixing distinct phenomena such as drug induced hallucinations, dreams, misattributed memories formed during emergence out of coma, etc.

== Historical reports ==
NDEs have been recorded since ancient times. Hemmingway claims that the story of a soldier from Pamphylia, killed in battle, who raised from death before his funeral pyre, mentioned by Plato at the end of the Republic, is an example of a near death experience. The oldest known medical report of near-death experiences was written by Pierre-Jean du Monchaux, an 18th-century French military doctor who described such a case in his book Anecdotes de Médecine. Monchaux hypothesized that an influx of blood in the brain stimulated a strong feeling in the individual, and therefore caused a near-death experience. In the 19th century a few studies moved beyond individual cases – one privately done by members of the Church of Jesus Christ of Latter-day Saints and one in Switzerland. Up to 2005, 95% of world cultures are known to have made some mention of NDEs.

In the U.S., an estimated nine million people have reported an NDE according to a 2011 study in Annals of the New York Academy of Sciences. Most of these near-death experiences resulted from serious injury affecting the body or brain. A number of more contemporary sources report the incidence of near death experiences as:

- 17% amongst critically ill patients, in nine prospective studies from four different countries.
- 10–20% of people who have come close to death.

== Near-death studies ==
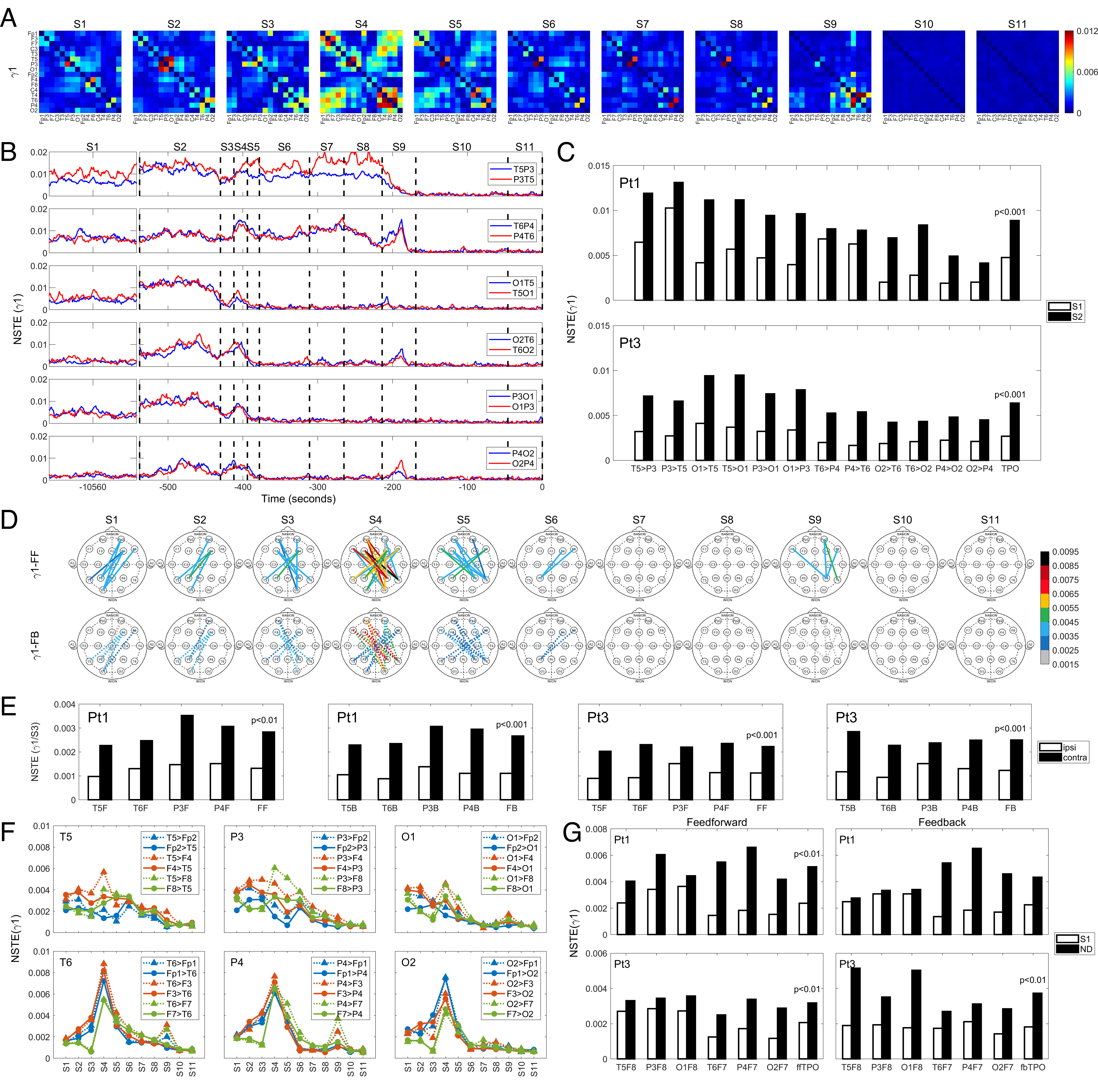
EEG research data by Gang Xu, et al.

Bruce Greyson (psychiatrist), Kenneth Ring (psychologist), and Michael Sabom (cardiologist), helped to launch the field of near-death studies and introduced the study of near-death experiences to the academic setting. From 1975 to 2005, some 2,500 self-reported individuals in the US had been reviewed in retrospective studies of the phenomena, with an additional 600 outside the US in the West, and 70 in Asia. Additionally, prospective studies had identified 270 individuals. Prospective studies review groups of individuals (e.g., selected emergency room patients) and then find who had an NDE during the study's time; such studies cost more to perform. In all, close to 3,500 individual cases between 1975 and 2005 had been reviewed in one or another study. All these studies were carried out by some 55 researchers or teams of researchers.

Melvin L. Morse, head of the Institute for the Scientific Study of Consciousness, and colleagues have investigated near-death experiences among children. Researchers from the University of Michigan led by Jimo Borjigin discovered that areas of the brain responsible for interior visual experience were more active during cardiac arrest. Following the rapid gamma activation locally within the posterior TPO zones, the long-range, global, and interhemispheric communications in gamma oscillations between the TPO zones and the prefrontal areas were activated in the dying brain, evidenced by the delayed activation of temporofrontal, parietofrontal, and Occipitofrontal networks when heart rate began to decline. Intriguingly, the long-range gamma connectivity between the posterior hot zones and the prefrontal areas at near-death was significantly higher over baseline only for those crossing the midline. Studies suggest that interhemispheric circuitry is important for memory recall, and gamma synchrony across the midlines is critical for learning, information integration, and perception.

=== The Near Death Experience Research Foundation (NDERF) ===
American radiation oncologist Jeffrey Long has amassed a large database of NDEs through the Near Death Experience Research Foundation (NDERF). 835 out of 1,122 people who had experienced NDE seemed to feel an increase in alertness and consciousness although studies proved no sign of electrical brain activity. His second line of evidence studies the increase of accuracy developed by NDErs defining their resuscitation process with a 97.6% accuracy rate. Long documented seven more lines of evidence that all point to realism in NDE experiences, yet not all of them verifiable or defined by today's medical advances and technology. Having such an abnormally large amount (95.6% of 1,000 participants) of those who had experienced NDE proclaiming NDEs as real experiences, he concludes that although NDE are medically inexplicable, they are most probably a real phenomenon.

=== Recognition and criticism ===
According to literature, the field of near-death studies is associated with discovery, challenges, and controversy. Cant and colleagues note that "curiosity about the origin and prevalence of NDEs has escalated as technology and resuscitation techniques have improved". The topic attracts a lot of interest, which is reflected in search engine results, medical literature, opinion pieces and commentary. Kopel and Webb note that there has been a "burgeoning literature on near-death experiences", reflecting both the naturalistic perspectives of neurology and physiology, as well as perspectives that are not naturalistic. Skepticism towards the findings of near-death studies, and the validity of the near-death experience as a subject for scientific study, has been widespread. According to Knapton, in The Daily Telegraph, the subject was, until recently, controversial. Both scientists and medical professionals have in general tended to be skeptical. According to commentators in the field, the early study of near-death experiences was met with "academic disbelief". Acceptance of NDEs as a legitimate topic for scientific study has improved, but the process has been slow.

According to literature, "psychiatrists have played a role in the recognition of the "near-death" phenomenon as well as popularization of the subject and subsequent research". Kinsella noted that "Growing scholarly interest has followed popular interest in the subject". While there is not yet any academic consensus as to what the philosophical implications of NDE studies might be, the question of whatever the true and fundamental nature of human consciousness might be yet remains both unanswered, and highly contentious. Still, NDE researchers are in general agreement that NDE research is now a legitimate academic field of scientific research, and many recent discoveries in this field give rise to the hopes by some researchers that a "breakthrough" in the modern day understanding of the dying process may be imminent.

Kovoor and colleagues noted that there are some "methodological concerns within many of the prospective studies" mapped by their scoping review. They further observed: "Longer-term outcomes may have been biased by clinical characteristics and comorbidities, rather than near-death experiences, and this should remain a pertinent consideration." Skeptics have remarked that it is difficult to verify many of the anecdotal reports that are being used as background material in order to outline the features of the NDE. The findings of NDE research have been contested by several writers in the fields of psychology and neuroscience. Criticism of the field has also come from commentators within its own ranks. In an open letter to the NDE community, Ring has pointed to the "issue of possible religious bias in near-death studies". According to Ring, the field of near-death studies, as well as the larger NDE movement, has attracted a variety of religious and spiritual affiliations, from a number of traditions, which makes ideological claims on behalf of NDE research. In his view, this has compromised the integrity of research and discussion.

A 2021 study of 101 patients that underwent Deep hypothermic circulatory arrest found that none of them had anything that could be described as a Near-Death Experience.

== Clinical research in cardiac arrest patients ==
=== Parnia's study in 2001 ===
In 2001, Sam Parnia and colleagues published the results of a year-long study of cardiac arrest survivors that was conducted at Southampton General Hospital. 63 survivors were interviewed. They had been resuscitated after being clinically dead with no pulse, no respiration, and fixed dilated pupils. Parnia and colleagues investigated out-of-body experience claims by placing figures in areas where patients were likely to be resuscitated on suspended boards facing the ceiling, not visible from the floor. Four had experiences that, according to the study criteria, were NDEs but none of them experienced the out-of-body experience. Thus, they were not able to identify the figures. Psychologist Chris French wrote regarding the study "unfortunately, and somewhat atypically, none of the survivors in this sample experienced an out of body experience".

=== Van Lommel's study ===
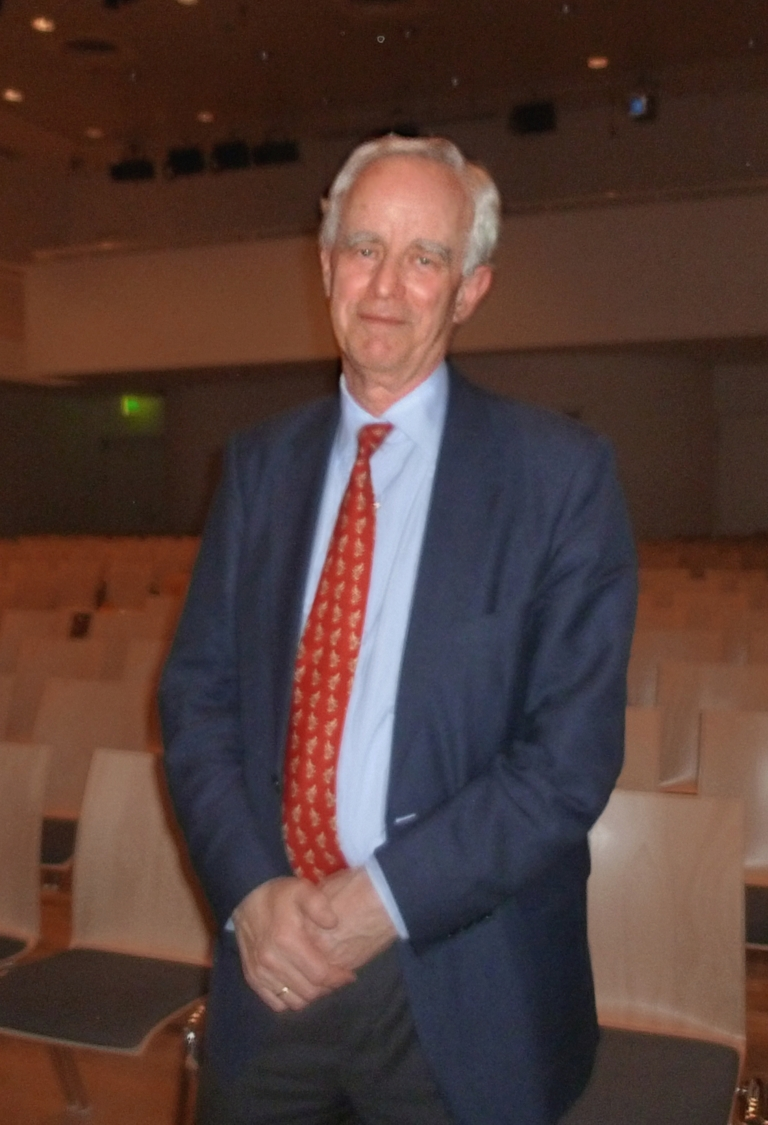
Pim van Lommel

In 2001, Pim van Lommel, a cardiologist from the Netherlands, and his team conducted a study on NDEs including 344 cardiac arrest patients who had been successfully resuscitated in 10 Dutch hospitals. Patients not reporting NDEs were used as controls for patients who did, and psychological (e.g., fear before cardiac arrest), demographic (e.g., age, sex), medical (e.g., more than one cardiopulmonary resuscitation (CPR)), and pharmacological data were compared between the two groups.

The work also included a longitudinal study where the two groups (those who had had an NDE and those who had not had one) were compared at two and eight years, for life changes. One patient had a conventional out of body experience. He reported being able to watch and recall events during the time of his cardiac arrest. His claims were confirmed by hospital personnel. "This did not appear consistent with hallucinatory or illusory experiences, as the recollections were compatible with real and verifiable rather than imagined events".

=== Awareness during resuscitation (AWARE) study ===
While at the University of Southampton, Parnia was the principal investigator of the AWARE Study, which was launched in 2008.^{[13]} The study, which concluded in 2012, included 33 investigators across 15 medical centers in the UK, Austria and the US and tested consciousness, memories and awareness during cardiac arrest. The accuracy of claims of visual and auditory awareness was examined using specific tests. One such test consisted of installing shelves, bearing a variety of images and facing the ceiling, hence not visible to hospital staff, in rooms where cardiac-arrest patients were more likely to occur. The results of the study were published in October 2014.

A review article analyzing the results reports that, out of 2,060 cardiac arrest events, 101 of 140 cardiac arrest survivors could complete the questionnaires. Of these 101 patients, 9% could be classified as near-death experiences. Two more patients (2% of those completing the questionnaires) described "seeing and hearing actual events related to the period of cardiac arrest". These two patients' cardiac arrests did not occur in areas equipped with ceiling shelves, hence no images could be used to objectively test for visual awareness claims. One of the two patients was too sick and the accuracy of her recount could not be verified. For the second patient, however, it was possible to verify the accuracy of the experience and to show that awareness occurred paradoxically some minutes after the heart stopped, at a time when "the brain ordinarily stops functioning and cortical activity becomes isoelectric (i.e., without any discernible electric activity)." The experience was not compatible with an illusion, imaginary event or hallucination since visual (other than of ceiling shelves' images) and auditory awareness could be corroborated.

As of May 2016, a posting at the UK Clinical Trials Gateway website described plans for AWARE II, a two-year multicenter observational study of 900–1,500 patients experiencing cardiac arrest, which said that subject recruitment had started on 1 August 2014 and that the scheduled end date was 31 May 2017. The study was extended, continuing until 2020. In 2019, a report of a condensed version of the study with 465 patients was released. Only one patient remembered the auditory stimuli while none remembered the visual. In November 2022, the full study was published.

== Explanatory models ==
In a 2005 review article, psychologist Chris French categorized models that try to explain NDEs into three broad groups which "are not distinct and independent, but instead show considerable overlap": spiritual (or transcendental), psychological, and physiological.

=== Spiritual or transcendental models ===
French summarizes this model by saying: "the most popular interpretation is that the NDE is exactly what it appears to be to the person having the experience". The NDE would represent evidence of the immaterial existence of a soul or mind, which leaves the body upon death, and provides information about an immaterial world where the soul journeys after death.

According to Greyson, some NDE phenomena cannot be easily explained with our current knowledge of human physiology and psychology. For instance, at a time when they were unconscious, patients could accurately describe events "from an out-of-body spatial perspective". In two different studies of patients who had survived a cardiac arrest, those who had reported leaving their bodies could describe accurately their resuscitation procedures or unexpected events, whereas others "described incorrect equipment and procedures". Sam Parnia also refers to two cardiac arrest studies and one deep hypothermic circulatory arrest study where patients reported visual and/or auditory awareness occurring when their brain function had ceased. These reports "were corroborated with actual and real events".

Five prospective studies have been carried out to test the accuracy of out of body perceptions by placing "unusual targets in locations likely to be seen by persons having NDEs, such as in an upper corner of a room in the emergency department, the coronary care unit, or the intensive care unit of a hospital." Twelve patients reported leaving their bodies, but none could describe the hidden visual targets. Although this is a small sample, the failure of purported out-of-body experiencers to describe the hidden targets raises questions about the accuracy of the anecdotal reports described above.

==== Criticism ====
Neuroscientist Charlotte Martial states that there is a dearth of solid empirical evidence about theories of non-local consciousness, which is claimed by some authors. Chris French has noted that "the survivalist approach does not appear to generate clear and testable hypotheses. Because of the vagueness and imprecision of the survivalist account, it can be made to explain any possible set of findings and is therefore unfalsifiable and unscientific."

=== Psychological models ===
French summarises the main psychological explanations, which include the depersonalization, the expectancy and the dissociation models.

==== Depersonalization model ====
A depersonalization model was proposed in the 1970s by professor of psychiatry Russell Noyes and clinical psychologist Roy Kletti, which suggested that the NDE is a form of depersonalization, experienced under emotional conditions such as life-threatening danger, potentially inescapable danger, and that the NDE can best be understood as a hallucination. According to this model, those who face their impending death become psychologically detached from their surroundings and bodies, no longer feel emotions, and experience time distortions.

This model suffers from a number of limitations to explain NDEs for subjects who do not experience a sensation of being out of their bodies; unlike NDEs, these hallucinatory experiences are dreamlike, unpleasant and characterized by "anxiety, panic and emptiness". Also, during NDEs subjects remain very lucid of their identities, and their sense of identity is not changed, unlike those experiencing depersonalization.

==== Expectancy model ====
Another psychological theory is called the expectancy model. It has been suggested that although these experiences could appear very real, they had actually been constructed in the mind, either consciously or subconsciously, in response to the stress of an encounter with death (or perceived encounter with death), and did not correspond to a real event. In a way, they are similar to wish-fulfillment: because someone thought they were about to die, they experienced certain things in accordance with what they expected or wanted to occur. Imagining a heavenly place was, in effect, a way for them to soothe themselves through the stress of knowing that they were close to death. Subjects use their own personal and cultural expectations to imagine a scenario that would protect them against an imminent threat to their lives.

Subjects' accounts often differed from their own "religious and personal expectations regarding death", which contradicts the hypothesis they may have imagined a scenario based on their cultural and personal background. Although the term NDE was first coined in 1975 and the experience first described then, recent descriptions of NDEs do not differ from those reported earlier than 1975. The only exception is the more frequent description of a tunnel. Hence, the fact that information about these experiences could be more easily obtained after 1975 had not influenced people's reports of the experiences. Another flaw of this model can be found in children's accounts of NDEs. These are similar to adults', despite children being less strongly affected by religious and cultural influences about death.

==== Dissociation model ====
The dissociation model proposes that NDE is a form of withdrawal to protect an individual from a stressful event. Under extreme circumstances, some people may detach from certain unwanted feelings in order to avoid experiencing the emotional impact and suffering associated with them. The person also detaches from one's immediate surroundings.

==== Birth model ====
The birth model suggests that near-death experiences could be a form of reliving the trauma of birth. Since a baby travels from the darkness of the womb to light and is greeted by the love and warmth of the nursing and medical staff, and so, it was proposed, the dying brain could be recreating the passage through a tunnel to light, warmth and affection. Reports of leaving the body through a tunnel are equally frequent among subjects who were born by cesarean section and natural birth. Newborns do not possess "the visual acuity, spatial stability of their visual images, mental alertness, and cortical coding capacity to register memories of the birth experience".

=== Physiological models ===
A wide range of physiological theories of the NDE have been put forward, including those based upon cerebral hypoxia, anoxia, and hypercapnia; endorphins and other neurotransmitters; and abnormal activity in the temporal lobes. Neurobiological factors in the experience have been investigated by researchers in the field of medical science and psychiatry. Among the researchers and commentators who tend to emphasize a naturalistic and neurological base for the experience is the British psychologist Susan Blackmore (1993), with her "dying brain hypothesis".

==== Neuroanatomical models ====
According to Greyson, multiple neuroanatomical models have been proposed, wherein NDEs have been hypothesized to originate from different anatomical areas of the brain, namely: the limbic system, the hippocampus, the left temporal lobe, Reissner's fiber in the central canal of the spinal cord, the prefrontal cortex, and the right temporal lobe. Neuroscientists Olaf Blanke and Sebastian Dieguez (2009), from the Ecole Polytechnique Fédérale de Lausanne, Switzerland, propose a brain-based model with two types of NDEs:

- "type 1 NDEs are due to bilateral frontal and occipital, but predominantly right hemispheric brain damage affecting the right temporal-parietal junction and characterized by out-of-body-experiences, altered sense of time, sensations of flying, lightness vection and flying"
- "type 2 NDEs are also due to bilateral frontal and occipital, but predominantly left hemispheric brain damage affecting the left temporal parietal junction and characterized by feeling of a presence, meeting and communication with spirits, seeing of glowing bodies, as well as voices, sounds, and music without vection"

Animation of the human left temporal lobe

They suggest that damage to the bilateral occipital cortex may lead to visual features of NDEs such as seeing a tunnel or lights, and "damage to unilateral or bilateral temporal lobe structures such as the hippocampus and amygdala" may lead to emotional experiences, memory flashbacks or a life review. They concluded that future neuroscientific studies are likely to reveal the neuroanatomical basis of the NDE, which will lead to the demystification of the subject without needing paranormal explanations.

French has written that the "temporal lobe is almost certain to be involved in NDEs, given that both damage to and direct cortical stimulation of this area are known to produce a number of experiences corresponding to those of the NDE, including OBEs, hallucinations, and memory flashbacks". Vanhaudenhuyse et al. (2009) reported that recent studies employing deep brain stimulation and neuroimaging have demonstrated that out-of-body experiences can result from a deficient multisensory integration at the temporal-parietal junction and that ongoing studies aim to further identify the functional neuroanatomy of near-death experiences by means of standardized EEG recordings.

===== Criticism =====
Blanke et al. admit that their model remains speculative due to the lack of data. In addition, the reports of those who had the brain stimulation were almost nothing like OBEs reported by those who had NDEs, mainly characterized by a sense of elevation and (often limited) spatial awareness, while other characteristics of NDEs were absent. Anomalies such as seeing maps, half-bodies and duplications were also noted. Likewise, Greyson writes that although some, or any of the proposed neuroanatomical models may serve to explain NDEs and pathways through which they are expressed, they remain speculative at this stage, since they have not been tested in empirical studies.

==== Neurochemical models ====
Some theories explain reported NDEs as resulting from drugs used during resuscitation (in the case of resuscitation-induced NDEs) ─ for example, ketamine ─ or from endogenous chemicals (neurotransmitters) that transmit signals between brain cells:

- In the early 1980s, Daniel Carr wrote that the NDE has characteristics that are suggestive of a limbic lobe syndrome and that the NDE can be explained by the release of endorphins and enkephalins in the brain. Endorphins are endogenous molecules "released in times of stress and lead to a reduction in pain perception and a pleasant, even blissful, emotional state."
- Judson and Wiltshaw (1983) noted how the administration of endorphin-blocking agents such as naloxone had been occasionally reported to produce "hellish" NDEs. This would be coherent with endorphins' role in causing a "positive emotional tone of most NDEs".
- Morse et al. (1989) proposed a model arguing that serotonin played a more important role than endorphins in generating NDEs, "at least with respect to mystical hallucinations and OBEs".
- A 2019 large-scale study found that ketamine, Salvia divinorum, and DMT (and other classical psychedelic substances) are linked to near-death experiences.
- While ketamine, and other endogenous chemicals can be a source for NDE, it can also mimic these NDE and simulate that out-of-body experiences linked to NDE.

===== Criticism =====
According to Parnia, neurochemical models are not backed by data. This is true for "NMDA receptor activation, serotonin, and endorphin release" models. Parnia writes that no data has been collected via thorough and careful experimentation to back "a possible causal relationship or even an association" between neurochemical agents and NDE experiences.

==== Multi-factorial models ====
The first formal neurobiological model for NDEs in 1989 included endorphins, neurotransmitters of the limbic system, the temporal lobe and other parts of the brain. Extensions and variations of their model came from other scientists such as Louis Appleby (1989). Other authors suggest that all components of near-death experiences can be explained in their entirety via psychological or neurophysiological mechanisms, although the authors admit that these hypotheses have to be tested by science.

==== Low oxygen levels (and G-LOC) model ====
Low oxygen levels in the blood (hypoxia or anoxia) have been hypothesized to induce hallucinations and hence possibly explain NDEs. This is because low oxygen levels characterize life-threatening situations and also the apparent similarities between NDEs and G-force-induced loss of consciousness (G-LOC) episodes. These episodes are observed with fighter pilots experiencing very rapid and intense acceleration that results in lack of sufficient blood supply to the brain. Whinnery studied almost 1000 cases and noted how the experiences often involved "tunnel vision and bright lights, floating sensations, automatic movement, autoscopy, OBEs, not wanting to be disturbed, paralysis, vivid dreamlets of beautiful places, pleasurable sensations, psychological alterations of euphoria and dissociation, inclusion of friends and family, inclusion of prior memories and thoughts, the experience being very memorable (when it can be remembered), confabulation, and a strong urge to understand the experience."

Acceleration-induced hypoxia's primary characteristics are "rhythmic jerking of the limbs, compromised memory of events just prior to the onset of unconsciousness, tingling of extremities ..." that are not observed during NDEs. G-LOC episodes do not feature life reviews, mystical experiences and "long-lasting transformational aftereffects", although this may be due to the fact that subjects have no expectation of dying. Hypoxic hallucinations are characterized by "distress and agitation", and this is very different from near-death experiences, which subjects usually report as being pleasant.

==== Altered blood gas levels models ====
Some investigators have studied whether hypercarbia or higher than normal carbon dioxide levels, could explain the occurrence of NDEs. However, studies are difficult to interpret since NDEs have been observed both with increased levels as well as decreased levels of carbon dioxide, and other studies have observed NDEs when levels had not changed, but there is insufficient data on these factors.

==== Other models ====
French said that at least some reports of NDEs might be based upon false memories. According to Engmann (2008), near-death experiences of people who are clinically dead are psychopathological symptoms caused by a severe malfunction of the brain resulting from the cessation of cerebral blood circulation. An important question is whether it is possible to "translate" the bloomy experiences of the reanimated survivors into psychopathologically basic phenomena, e.g., acoasms (nonverbal auditory hallucinations), central narrowing of the visual field, autoscopia, visual hallucinations, activation of limbic and memory structures (according to Moody's stages). The symptoms suppose a primary affliction of the occipital and temporal cortices under clinical death. This basis could be congruent with the thesis of pathoclisis – the inclination of special parts of the brain to be the first to be damaged in case of disease, lack of oxygen, or malnutrition – established in 1922 by Cécile Vogt-Mugnier and Oskar Vogt.

Professor of neurology Terence Hines (2003) claimed that near-death experiences are hallucinations caused by cerebral anoxia, drugs, or brain damage. Greyson has called into question the adequacy of the materialist, mind-brain identity model for explaining NDEs. An NDE often involves vivid and complex mentation, sensation and memory-formation under circumstances of completely disabled brain function during general anesthesia, or near-complete cessation of cerebral blood flow and oxygen uptake during cardiac arrest. Materialist models predict that such conscious experiences should be impossible under these conditions. The mind-brain identity model of classic materialist psychology may need to be expanded to adequately explain an NDE.

== See also ==
- After-death communication – Spiritual practice
- Beyond and Back – 1978 film
- Cognitive science of religion – Study of religious thought and behavior
- Deathbed phenomena – Range of experiences reported by dying people
- Deism – Belief in a God who does not intervene in the universe
- Form constant – Recurringly observed geometric pattern
- Heaven Is for Real – Christian non-fiction book
- Lazarus syndrome – Medical phenomenon
- Near-birth experience – Alleged recollected event which occurred before or during one's own birth
- Neurotheology – Attempts to explain religious experience in neuroscientific terms
- Out-of-body experience – Phenomenon in which the soul (astral body) is said to exit the physical body
- Pam Reynolds case – Reported near-death experience
- Passage (Willis novel) – 2001 novel by Connie Willis
- Proof of Heaven – 2012 nonfiction book by Eben Alexander
- Psychedelic experience – Altered state of consciousness
- Resurrection – Concept of coming back to life
- Saved by the Light – 1994 book by Dannion Brinkley
- Terminal lucidity – Sign of impending death
- Zendegi Pas Az Zendegi – Iranian reality TV series (2020–2025)
