= October 1975 =

Month of 1975

<<	October 1975					>>
Su	Mo	Tu	We	Th	Fr	Sa
			1	2	3	4
5	6	7	8	9	10	11
12	13	14	15	16	17	18
19	20	21	22	23	24	25
26	27	28	29	30	31

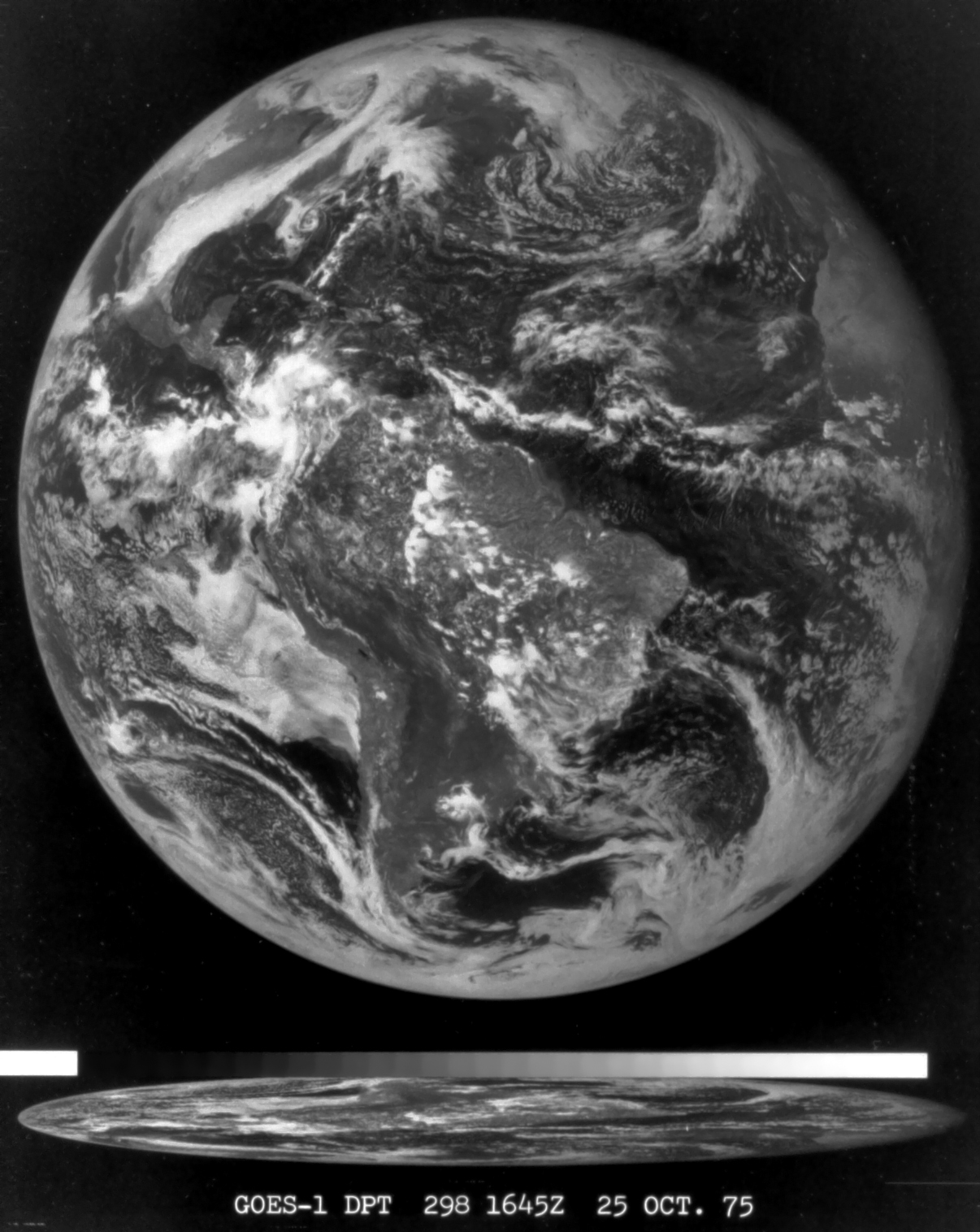
October 16, 1975: American GOES satellite launched, takes first weather photos October 25

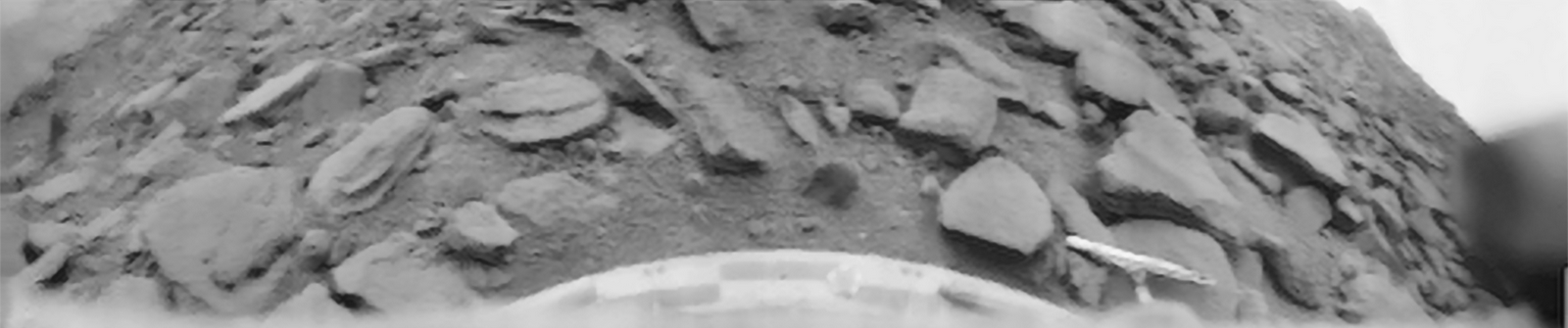
October 22, 1975: The first photos of the surface of Venus are returned to Earth by the Soviet Union's Venera 9

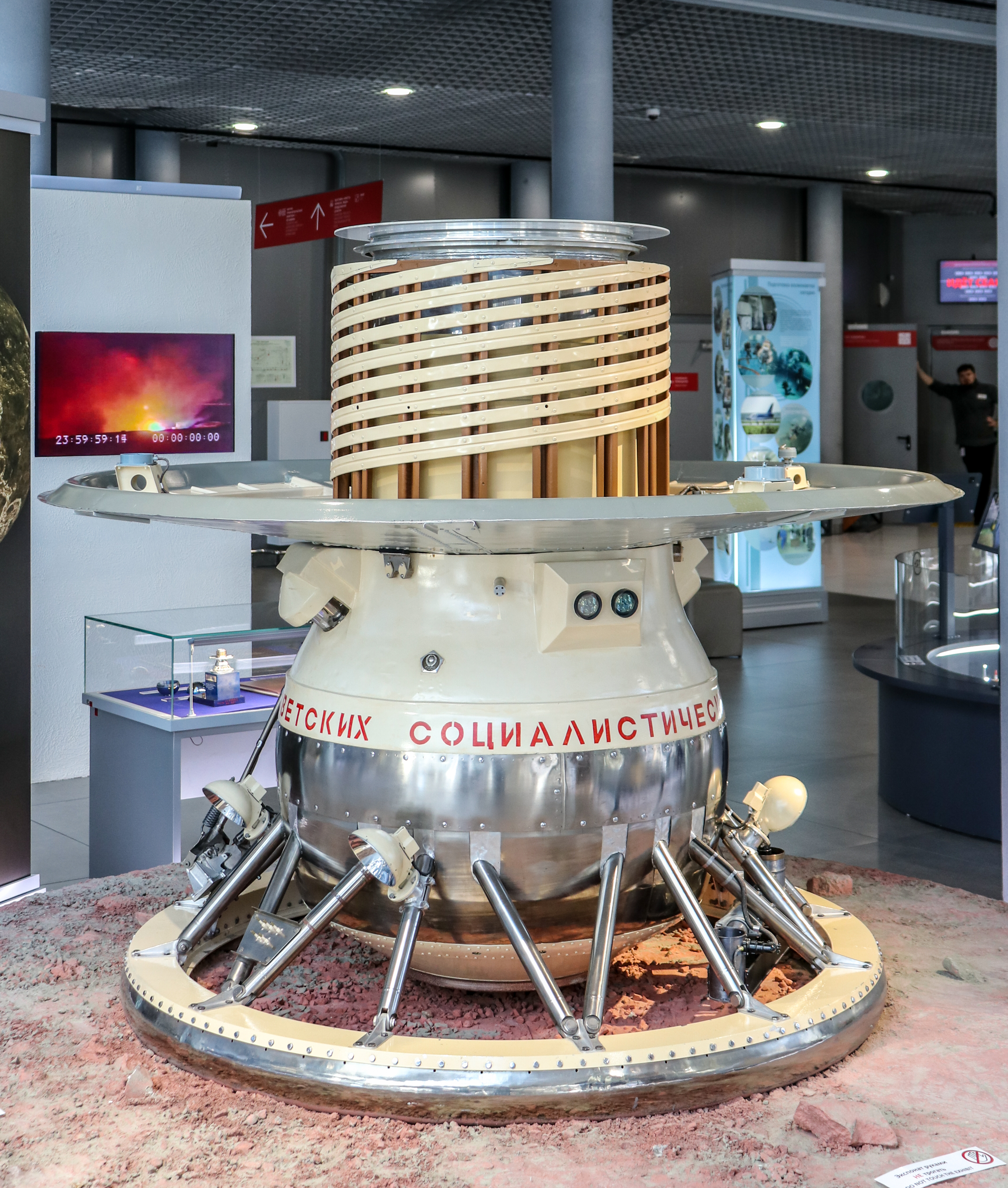
Scale model of the Venera 9 probe

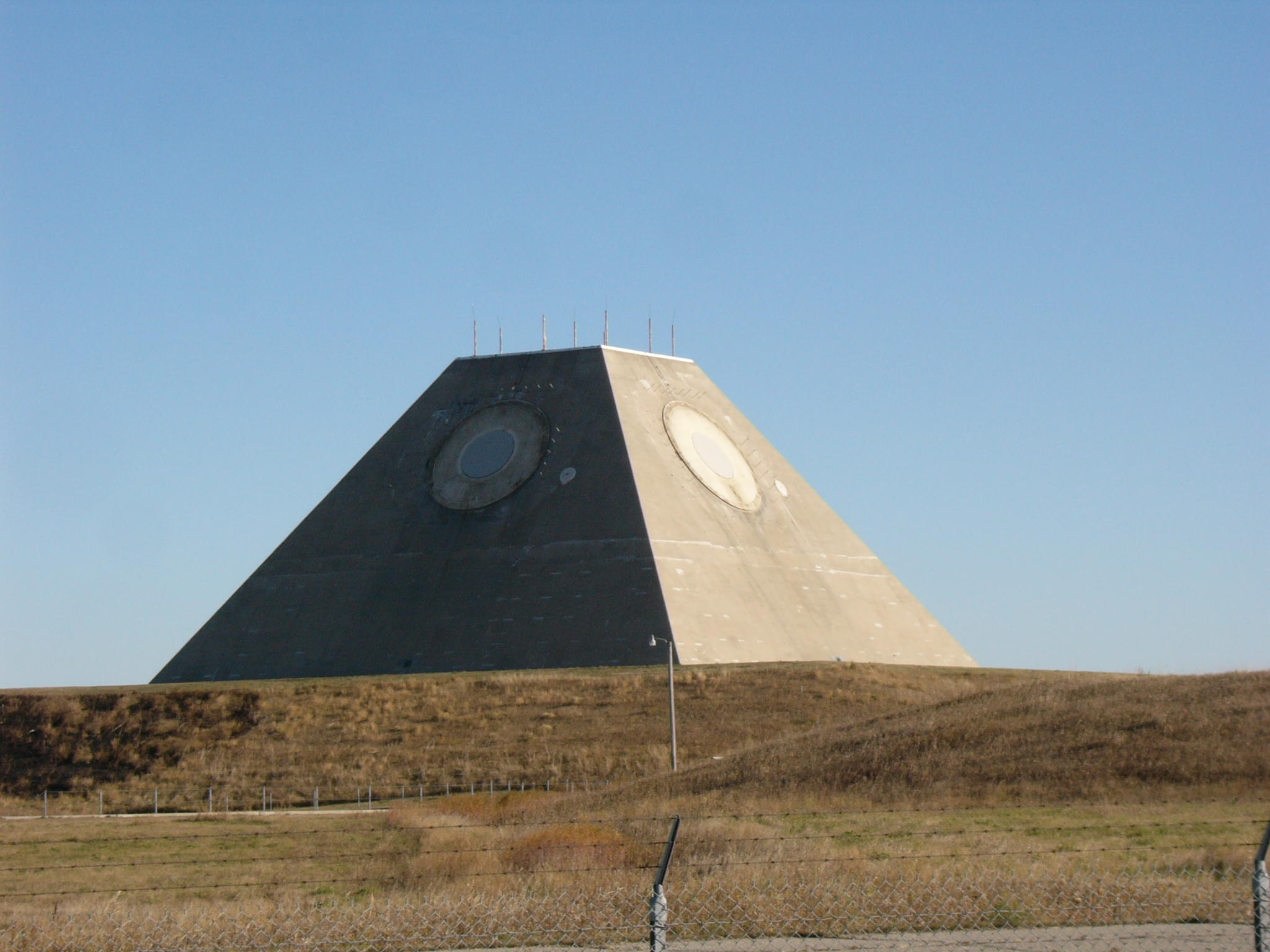
October 1, 1975: $5.7 billion U.S. Safeguard system becomes operational in North Dakota, shutdown voted one day later

The following events occurred in October 1975:

== October 1, 1975 (Wednesday) ==
- In the "Thrilla in Manila", Muhammad Ali retained his world heavyweight boxing championship against former champion Joe Frazier in a boxing match in Manila, the Philippines.
- Morocco and Mauritania reached a secret agreement to invade the Western Sahara and divide the territory between them, after Spain announced that it would hold a referendum in the Saharan colony.
- The Gilbert and Ellice Islands, a British protectorate in the South Pacific Ocean, were divided in anticipation of independence. The Gilbert Islands would become the nation of Kiribati, while the Ellice Islands would become Tuvalu.
- After eight years of construction and the spending of 5.7 billion dollars, the Safeguard Program, anti-ballistic missile complex for the United States, became fully operational in Cavalier County, North Dakota with two radar complexes and 32 silos. The U.S. House of Representatives voted the next day to shut down the program, in large part because the radar system was a vulnerable target that would be ineffective during a nuclear war; the site was closed after four months.
- A blast at a Canadian Industries Ltd. (CIL) explosives factory killed eight employees at McMasterville, Quebec, near Montreal.

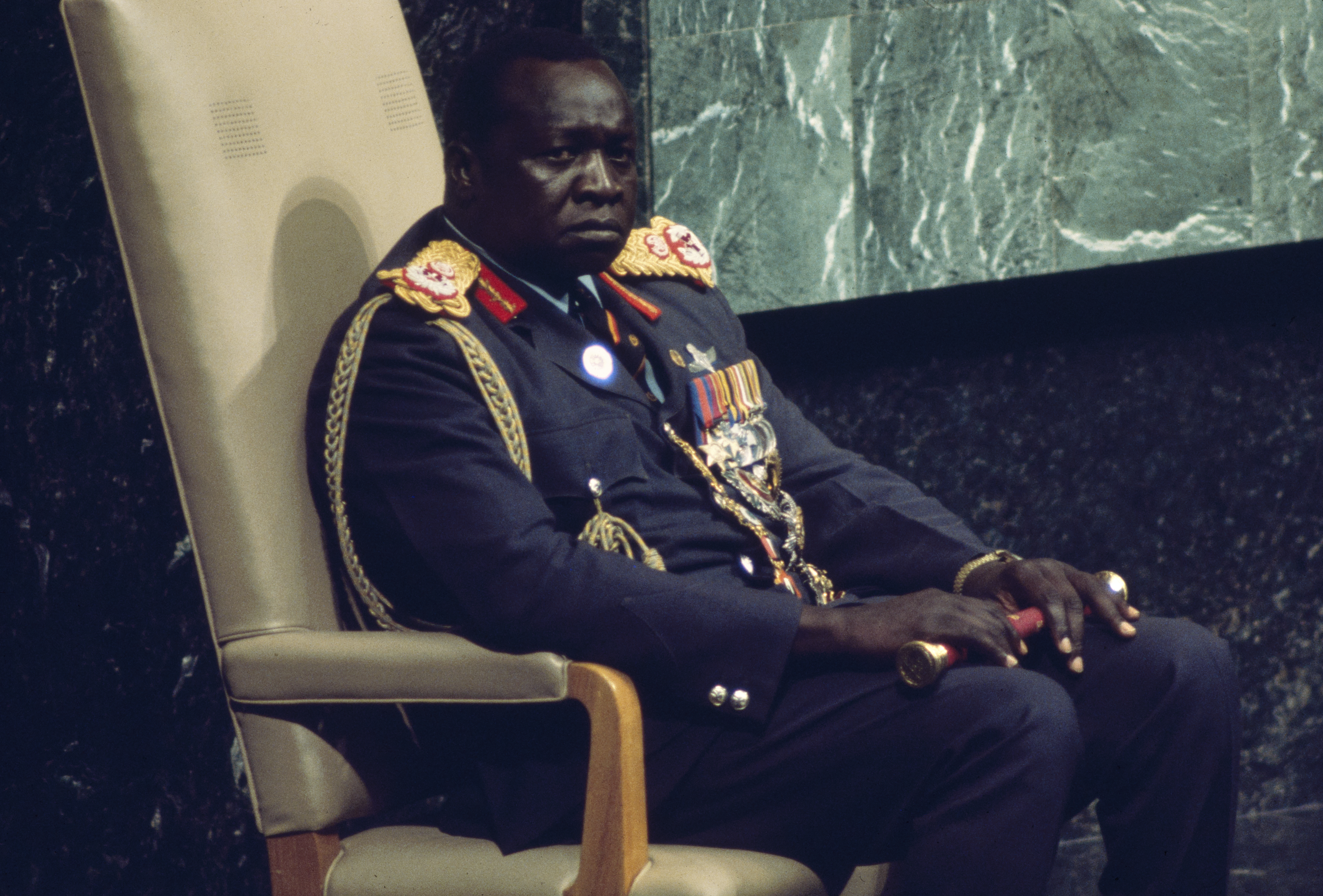
Idi Amin at the UN general assembly shortly before giving his speech

- Ugandan President Idi Amin addressed the United Nations General Assembly in New York, and criticized Zionism for its influence in the United States and the actions by the State of Israel for its occupation of territory that it had captured during the Six-Day War.
- Died: Al Jackson, Jr., 39, American drummer who was a founder of Booker T. & the M.G.'s, died after being shot during a burglary of his home in Memphis.

== October 2, 1975 (Thursday) ==
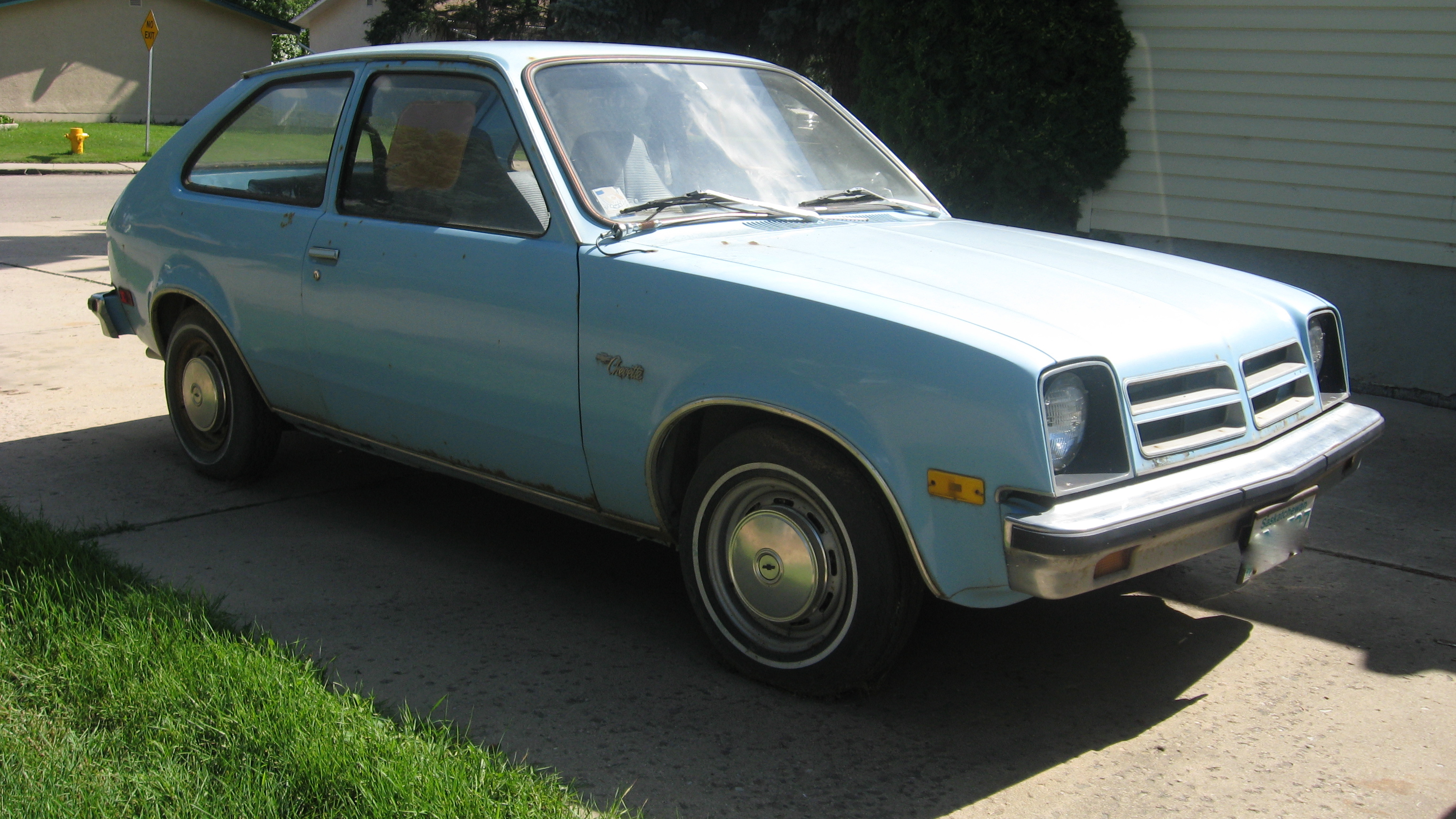
A '76 Chevette

- The W. T. Grant department store chain, with over 1,000 stores in 42 U.S. states, filed a Chapter 11 action for reorganization in the largest retail store bankruptcy in American history. The last 359 stores would go out of business at the end of March 1976 as a result of court-ordered liquidation.
- The first Chevrolet Chevette, a two-door hatchback called the Chevette Scooter, went on sale. The first of the 1976 models had rolled off the Detroit assembly line on August 18 as "the first of hundreds of thousands of little three-door autos that are the smallest made in large volume in the United States since the Crosley." and the car was unveiled on September 16, in Washington, DC. The Chevette had a 1.4 liter engine and got 40 mpg on the highway, but had little room, with a reviewer noting "If the Chevette is the car of the future, luggage space will soon be a thing of the past."
- The U.S. Congress reversed its decision on an embargo against arms sales to Turkey.

== October 3, 1975 (Friday) ==
Bangladesh and Pakistan
- For the first time since Bangladesh had seceded from Pakistan in December 1971, the two nations established diplomatic relations.
- The Teton Dam in Idaho began to fill as the Teton River was closed off. Eight months later, on June 5, 1976, the earthen dam would break, flooding the town of Wilford and killing eleven people.
- Died: Guy Mollet, 69, former Prime Minister of France (1956–1957)

== October 4, 1975 (Saturday) ==
- Professional wrestler Johnny Valentine (John Wisniski), the reigning NWA champion, was paralyzed, and Ric Flair (Richard Fliehr) sustained a broken back, when the plane in which they were riding ran out of gas and crashed at Wilmington, North Carolina, killing the pilot. Despite being advised to give up the pro wrestling circuit, Flair would return to the ring after months of rehabilitation and an alteration of his style, and would go on to fame and fortune as "The Nature Boy".
- Died: May Sutton, 89, American tennis champion, Wimbledon women singles title 1905 and 1907, U.S. Open singles champion 1904

== October 5, 1975 (Sunday) ==
Algerian nuthatch

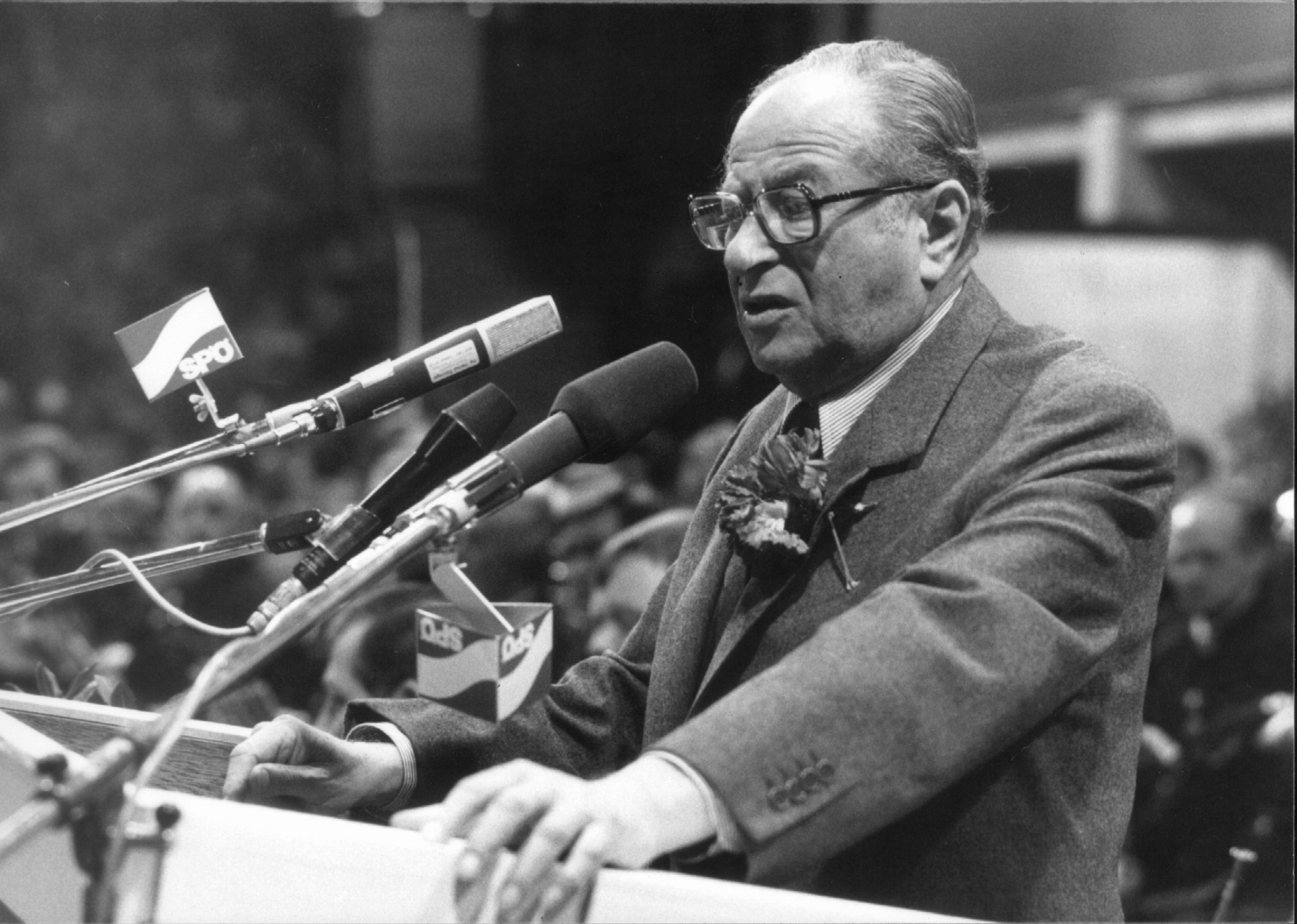
Austrian chancellor Bruno Kreisky

- In elections for the Austrian Nationalrat, the Social Democratic Party of Austria, led by Chancellor Bruno Kreisky, retained its slim majority in the lower house of Parliament, with 93 of the 183 seats.
- The Algerian nuthatch (Sitta ledanti), a small passerine bird which is the only bird species endemic to Algeria, was first discovered. A team led by Belgian botanist Jean-Pierre Ledant, had been at the Djebel Babor mountain in the Petite Kabylie range in northern Algeria, for a different purpose, the study of the Algerian fir tree species.
- The ten-team Swedish Hockey League (Svenska Hockeyligan or SHL) began playing as Sweden's top professional ice hockey league. The first game was an 8 to 7 win by MoDo AIK (of Örnsköldsvik) over Färjestads BK (of Karlstad), and the first goal was scored by Färjestads' Benny Andersson of Färjestad. On March 22, after a four-team playoff Färjestads would win the first championship, 2 games to 1, over Leksands IF.
- Born:
  - Kate Winslet, British film actress (Titanic); in Reading, Berkshire
  - Parminder Nagra, British film actress (Bend It Like Beckham); in Leicester
  - Gao Yuanyuan, Chinese television actress (The Prince of Qin, Li Shimin); in Beijing
  - Monica Rial, American voice actress (Dragon Ball Z); in Houston
- Died: Lesley Molseed, 11, was murdered in England at West Yorkshire. Stefan Kiszko would be convicted of the crime and would spend 16 years in prison before forensic evidence proved his innocence. Molseed's killer, Ronald Castree, would not be identified and caught until 2006.

== October 6, 1975 (Monday) ==
- Italo Luder, serving as Acting President of Argentina during a leave of absence by President Isabel Perón, signed Decree 2772, giving the Argentine armed forces authority to "annihilate subversion" ("aniquilar la subversion") by any means necessary against guerilla insurgents.
- For the first time in American television history, major TV networks declined a request to interrupt programming to broadcast a speech by a U.S. president. The nationwide address by President Gerald Ford was carried only by the ABC Television Network.
- The DINA (Dirección de Inteligencia Nacional), secret police agency of Chile, attempted to assassinate former Interior Minister Bernardo Leighton and his wife Anita, who were in exile in Italy. The Leightons were seriously wounded but survived a machine gun attack by paid gunmen.
- Born: Peter Pellegrini, President of Slovakia since 2024, Prime Minister 2018 to 2020; in Banská Bystrica
- Died: Chiura Obata, 89, Japanese-American artist, in Okayama Prefecture

== October 7, 1975 (Tuesday) ==
- Five days after President Ford vetoed an extension of the federal school lunch and nutrition program, both houses of Congress voted to override, 397–18 in the House and 79–13 in the Senate.
- East Germany and the Soviet Union signed a new Treaty of Friendship, Cooperation and Mutual Assistance, although their 1964 Friendship Treaty still had nine years to run. The 20-year treaty was to run until 1995, although East Germany would end in 1990 and the Soviet Union in 1991.
- John Lennon, formerly of The Beatles, won the right to stay in the United States after a four-year legal battle to avoid deportation, when the U.S. Court of Appeals for the Second Circuit ruled 2–1 to reverse an INS order of deportation. Two days later, Lennon would celebrate his 35th birthday and the birth of his son, Sean.
- Born:
  - Terry Gerin, American professional wrestler billed as "Rhino Richards"; in Detroit
  - Kaspars Znotiņš, Latvian stage actor, in Jelgava, Latvian SSR, Soviet Union

== October 8, 1975 (Wednesday) ==
- South Korean serial killer Kim Dae-doo, who murdered 14 people in the month of September and 17 total, was arrested the day after claiming his final victim, bringing an end to a killing spree that had started on August 13, 1975.
- Doug Jarvis played his very first National Hockey League game, with two assists for the Montreal Canadiens in a 9–0 win over the Los Angeles Kings, and then appeared in 964 consecutive games to set the NHL record, finishing on October 10, 1987, with a 4–2 loss for the Hartford Whalers against the New York Islanders.
- Women were allowed admission into the United States Service academies (at West Point, Annapolis, Colorado Springs, New London and Kings Point) for the first time, as President Ford signed legislation that included the requirement.
- The defending champions of pro basketball's two rival leagues played in an exhibition game in Louisville, with the ABA Kentucky Colonels beating the NBA champion Golden State Warriors, 93–90. On October 5, 1971, the NBA's Milwaukee Bucks had beaten the ABA's Utah Stars 122–114.

== October 9, 1975 (Thursday) ==
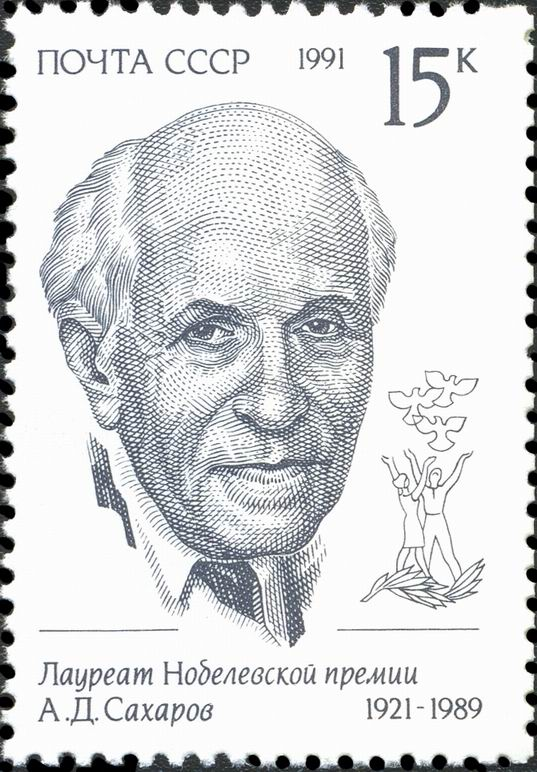
Late recognition for Sakharov

- Soviet nuclear physicist and dissident Andrei Sakharov was announced as the recipient of the 1975 Nobel Peace Prize, but was not allowed to travel to Oslo to accept it.
- The U.S. Senate voted 70–18 to authorize American civilians to join the United Nations forces in the Sinai peninsula, a day after the House had approved the measure 341–69.
- West Germany and Poland signed three agreements in Warsaw, with Poland agreeing to allow 125,000 former German nationals to emigrate to West Germany, in return for two billion deutschmarks worth of credit. Poland received major territories from the losing Germany after WW2, from which most Germans had been expelled, with the remainder suffering discrimination.
- The snail darter (Percina tanasi), a small fish indigenous to the Little Tennessee River, was declared an endangered species by the United States. Protection of the habitat of the snail darter would delay construction of the Tellico Dam for two years; the dam would eventually be constructed and the snail darter population would increase to the point that its status would be altered in 1984 to "threatened species".
- Born: Sean Lennon, American singer and songwriter, to John Lennon and Yoko Ono, in New York City

== October 10, 1975 (Friday) ==
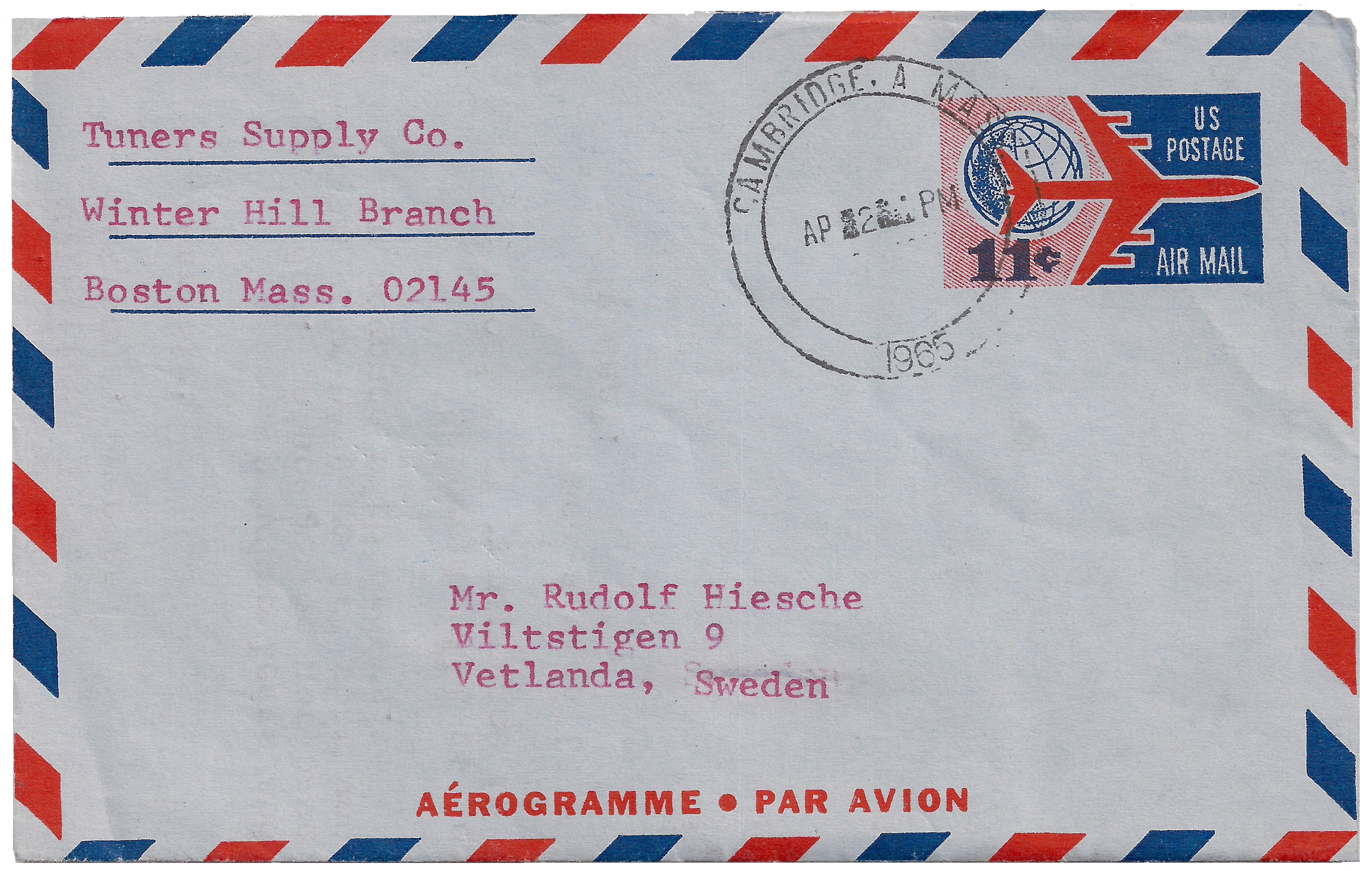
An airmail cover envelope from 1965

- "Airmail" was ended in the U.S. as a separate form of mailing letters domestically and internationally, bringing a close to an era when delivery would be made more quickly by paying additional postage to guarantee that the mail would be carried by airplane, rather than by train or truck, to its destination. By 1975, the U.S. Postal Service was transporting all interzone mail by airplane.
- Elizabeth Taylor and Richard Burton remarried, with a civil ceremony taking place in the African nation of Botswana. Although their first marriage lasted from 1964 to 1974, the second union would end in 1976.
- Died:
  - Norman Levinson, 63, American mathematician
  - Lillian Walker, 88, American film actress

== October 11, 1975 (Saturday) ==
- NBC aired the first episode of Saturday Night Live. Comedian George Carlin was the first host, and Billy Preston and Janis Ian were the first musical guests.
- Bill Clinton, 29, and Hillary Rodham, 27, both professors at the University of Arkansas School of Law in Fayetteville, Arkansas, were married at their home on 930 West California Drive.

== October 12, 1975 (Sunday) ==
- Oliver Plunkett (1629–1681), the martyred Primate of All Ireland, was proclaimed a saint in the Roman Catholic Church by Pope Paul VI. Plunkett was the first Irishman to be canonized since the 13th century, when Laurence O'Toole had attained sainthood in 1225 AD.
- The Willow Creek Community Church, which would become one of the first Christian megachurches (averaging 24,000 attendees per weekend in later years), held its first service, at a movie theater in Palatine, Illinois.
- Born: Marion Jones, American track athlete and women's pro basketball player; winner of five Olympic medals in 2000, later disqualified; in Los Angeles

== October 13, 1975 (Monday) ==
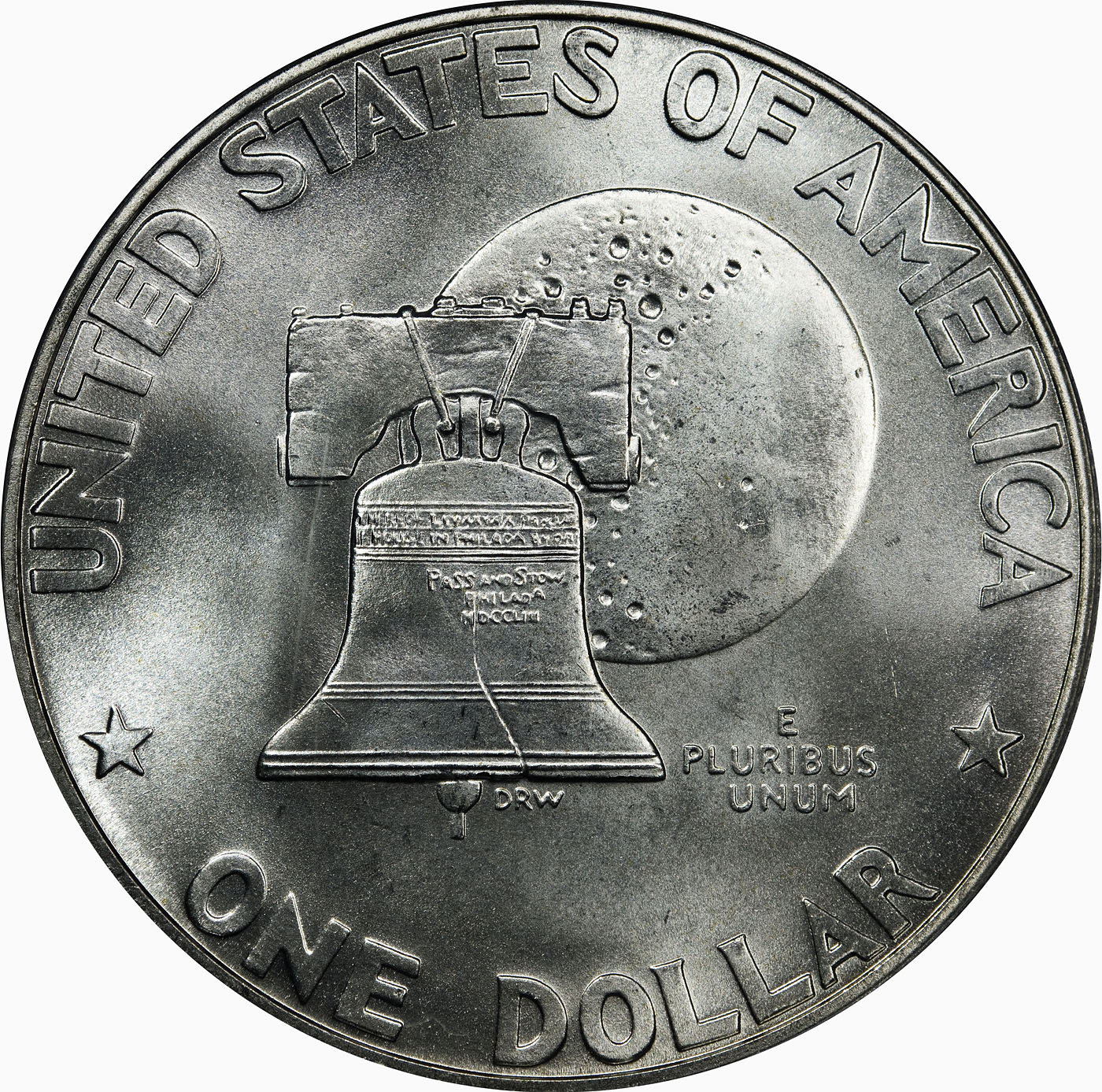

- The Māori land march took place in New Zealand with 5,000 Māori people arriving at the Parliament Building in Wellington after having marched from Te Hāpua on the north side of the nation.
- Prime Minister of Canada Pierre Trudeau said in a nationally televised speech that he would establish mandatory wage and price controls in order to bring inflation under control, and that an Anti-Inflation Board would enforce the new rules.
- The bicentennial American dollar coin was placed into circulation by the United States Treasury. For the first time, the dollar coin had no silver content; the 1974 coins had 40 percent silver. The dollar still had the image of President Dwight D. Eisenhower on the obverse, with "1776–1976" beneath, but the reverse featured a new image, showing the Liberty Bell and the Moon.
- Died: Swede Risberg, 81, last surviving member of the eight baseball players banned for life for the Black Sox Scandal

== October 14, 1975 (Tuesday) ==
- In Operation Savannah, less than one month before Angola's scheduled independence from Portugal, troops from the South African Defence Force invaded by crossing the border from the trust territory of South-West Africa (now Namibia). Battle Groups Alpha and Bravo rendezvoused in the Cunene Province near Katwitwi. Cuba would begin sending combat troops on November 8 to fight the SADF force.
- An RAF Avro Vulcan bomber exploded and crashed over Żabbar, Malta after an aborted landing, killing five crew members and one person on the ground.
- Born: Floyd Landis, American cyclist and 2006 Tour de France winner who was later stripped of his title; in Farmersville, Pennsylvania

== October 15, 1975 (Wednesday) ==
- Jean-Marie Seroney, the Deputy Speaker of the National Assembly of Kenya, and another MP, Martin Shikuku, were arrested at their offices in the Parliament building in Nairobi on the orders of President Jomo Kenyatta, who was displeased at their criticism of the government. Both would remain imprisoned until after Kenyatta's death in 1978.
- Born: Ginuwine (Elgin Baylor Lumpkin), American singer, in Washington, D.C.

== October 16, 1975 (Thursday) ==
- King Hassan II of Morocco announced that he would lead a march of 350,000 civilians across the border into the Western Sahara in order to stake claims for the area as part of Morocco.
- The Balibo Five, television journalists who were reporting for two networks in Australia, were murdered at the town of Balibo by Indonesian forces that had invaded Portuguese Timor. Reporter Greg Shackleton and soundman Tony Stewart of Australia, cameraman Gary Cunningham of New Zealand worked for the Melbourne station of the Seven Network, while reporter Malcolm Rennie and cameraman Brian Peters, both British, were in East Timor for the Sydney station of the Nine Network.
- The first of the Geostationary Operational Environmental Satellite (GOES) series, GOES 1, was launched by the United States and placed in geosynchronous orbit over the Indian Ocean to gather meteorological data.
- The last case of Variola major, one of the two smallpox viruses, was diagnosed and treated, with the victim being a two-year-old girl.
- Born: Jacques Kallis, South African cricket superstar and all-rounder, in Pinelands

== October 17, 1975 (Friday) ==
- The Justices of the United States Supreme Court voted 7–1 not to assign any decisions to the ailing Justice William O. Douglas, and to postpone resolution of any cases where his vote would be important, after the ailing Douglas had been observed falling to sleep during arguments. Douglas did not participate in the vote, and Byron R. White, who wrote a protest to his brethren on the Court, was the only dissenting vote. Douglas was hospitalized again two weeks later and retired from the Court.
- The Baltimore Claws, newest team in the American Basketball Association, played their third and final exhibition game, losing to the Virginia Squires, 100–88, before a crowd of 500 people. The team folded three days later without ever playing a regular season game.
- 'Salem's Lot, an American vampire novel by Stephen King, is published.

== October 18, 1975 (Saturday) ==
- Pope Paul VI, leader of the Roman Catholic Church, criticized the Protestant Reformation that had been led in the 16th century by Martin Luther. In a speech in favor of European unity, the Pope said that "The Reformation, it is a historical fact, has contributed to a dispersion."
- Died:
  - Graham Haberfield, 33, British TV actor, of heart failure
  - Al Lettieri, 47, American movie actor (The Godfather) of a heart attack

== October 19, 1975 (Sunday) ==
- The last games of the World Football League were played. The largest crowd of the season (35,000) turned out in Birmingham to watch the two best teams (the 8–3–0 Birmingham Vulcans and the 7–4–0 Memphis Southmen) play; Birmingham won 21–0. In other games, the Shreveport Steamer defeated the visiting San Antonio Wings 41–31, the Portland Thunder won at home against the Jacksonville Express 30–13, and, in the last WFL game ever played, the Southern California Sun beat The Hawaiians, 26–7, in Honolulu. The WFL folded three days later.
- The last exhibition game between an American Basketball Association team and an NBA team took place in Salt Lake City, where the Utah Stars of the ABA defeated the Milwaukee Bucks, 106–101. The Utah Stars would go out of business in December, and the ABA would fold at the end of the 1975–76 season.
- Born: Benjamin Heckendorn, electronics modifier and independent film maker, in Richland Center, Wisconsin

== October 20, 1975 (Monday) ==
- The U.S. and the U.S.S.R. entered into a five-year agreement for the sale of at least 6,000,000 tons of American grain to the Soviets each year.
- Forty-three people were killed and more than 60 injured in the collision of two subway trains in the Mexico City Metro system. One train was preparing to pull out of the station when it stopped because someone had pulled the emergency cord "perhaps several times". The next scheduled train slammed into the stalled cars.
- Three Cuban Navy transport ships- El Vietnam Heroico, El Coral Island and La Plata brought the first Cuban soldiers to Angola, to support the Marxist MPLA.
- The U.S. Supreme Court affirmed in the case of Baker v. Owen that teachers could spank their pupils, even over objections of parents, after the giving of notice.

== October 21, 1975 (Tuesday) ==
- The first passenger train to run the entire 1,160 miles (1,870 km) length of the completed Tanzam Railroad arrived in Kapiri Mposhi in Zambia, two days after its departure from Dar es Salaam in Tanzania. The railway, a joint venture by Tanzania, Zambia, and the People's Republic of China, was completed a year ahead of schedule after five years of work by 80,000 laborers and engineers.
- The Boston Red Sox defeated the Cincinnati Reds, 7–6, in Game Six of the 1975 World Series, forcing a deciding seventh game, when Carlton Fisk hit a home run in the 12th inning to cap off what many consider to be the best World Series game ever played.
- Spain's dictator Francisco Franco suffered a heart attack that would leave him bedridden for the rest of his life; Franco would die 30 days later.
- Died: Charles Reidpath, 86, American track athlete and Olympic gold medalist

== October 22, 1975 (Wednesday) ==
- The Soviet space probe Venera 9 landed on the planet Venus and transmitted Earth's first photographs of the surface of another planet. The first ground-level photos of Venus showed that beneath the thick clouds of carbon dioxide, the planet has a rocky surface. Venera 9 transmitted for 53 minutes before its equipment gave way to temperatures of 485 °C (905 °F) and an atmospheric pressure 90 times higher than that of Earth.
- The Cincinnati Reds won the seventh and deciding game of the 1975 World Series, 4 to 3, over the Boston Red Sox. The broadcast set a new record for most-watched sporting event in American history. The Red Sox, who were hosting the final game at Fenway Park, had not won Major League Baseball's championship since 1918 but had led, 3 to 0, after five innings before the game was tied 3 to 3 going into the 9th inning. With two outs against the Reds, Joe Morgan was at strike two when he made the hit that brought Ken Griffey in from third base for the go-ahead run. Boston's chance to tie or win the game evaporated after Will McEnaney struck out the first two batters, and Carl Yastrzemski's fly ball hit to center field was caught to give the Reds their first win since 1940.
- At a meeting in New York, the owners of the 10 remaining teams of the World Football League voted, 6 to 4, to disband the money-losing organization prior to the 12th week of its 20-game schedule.
- Born: Jesse Tyler Ferguson, American TV actor (Mitchell Pritchett on Modern Family); in Missoula, Montana
- Died:
  - Arnold J. Toynbee, 86, British historian and author of the 12 volume A Study of History.
  - Daniş Tunalıgil, 60, Turkish Ambassador to Austria, was assassinated by the terrorist group Justice Commandos of the Armenian Genocide.

== October 23, 1975 (Thursday) ==
- British cancer specialist Gordon Fairley was killed by a terrorist bomb that had been intended by the Irish Republican Army to assassinate Hugh Fraser of the British House of Commons. Fraser had been preparing to drive Caroline Kennedy, the daughter of President John F. Kennedy, to an errand, but a telephone call delayed him as he was preparing to leave. Dr. Fairley happened to be walking his two dogs past Fraser's Jaguar XJ6 automobile when the time bomb exploded at 8:40 am.
- In accordance with the decree of May 27 making the Quechua language one of the official languages of Peru (second to Spanish), the official Quechua alphabet (Alfabeto Basico General de Quechua) was created, with 31 letters. Although c, j, x and z are not used alone, variations such as ch, chh, ch', kh and qh are included.
- Born: Odalys Garcia, Cuban-born TV actress, in Havana

== October 24, 1975 (Friday) ==
- Ninety percent of the women in Iceland took part in the first "women's strike", organized by the Red Stockings, a feminist group.

== October 25, 1975 (Saturday) ==
- Venera 10 became the second space probe to land on the planet Venus. The probe touched down 1,975 miles away from Venera 9 at 8:17 am Moscow time and relayed data, including photographs.
- A Bolivian Air Force transport plane crashed at Mocomoco, shortly after takeoff from La Paz, killing all 55 people on board.
- Fighting at a soccer football game in England left 102 people injured and 38 arrested at Upton Park Stadium in West Ham. The football hooliganism incident took place in a game between West Ham United F.C. and Manchester United F.C., and involved 400 violent fans. West Ham won 2–1.
- Born: Zadie Smith, English novelist, in London

== October 26, 1975 (Sunday) ==
- Justin de Jacobis (1800–1860), Italian-born missionary to Ethiopia, was canonized as a saint in the Roman Catholic Church.

== October 27, 1975 (Monday) ==
- In one of Canada's first school shootings, Robert Poulin shot five people, one fatally, at St. Pius X High School (Ottawa) before killing himself.
- For the first time, American news magazines Time and Newsweek published editions depicting the same individual on their covers, as both featured American rock musician Bruce Springsteen.
- Died:
  - Rex Stout, 88, American detective story author who created Nero Wolfe
  - Guillermo de Vega, 41, chief advisor to Philippine President Ferdinand Marcos, was shot five times at his office in the Malacañang Palace by Paulino Arceo, a civilian who had gotten a weapon past the building's security police.

== October 28, 1975 (Tuesday) ==
- In a private meeting with U.S. President Gerald R. Ford, Vice President Nelson Rockefeller agreed that he would announce a decision not to be Ford's running mate in 1976. Ford had been in favor of selecting Rockefeller, but was persuaded by aides Donald Rumsfeld and Dick Cheney that Rockefeller's presence could give Ronald Reagan an edge in getting the Republican nomination.
- Leah Leshefsky, 63, became the last of ten elderly women believed to have been raped and murdered by the "Westside Rapist", who terrorized Los Angeles for almost a year. Beginning on November 7, 1974, women ranging in age from 63 to 92 years old were killed in their homes. In 2011, DNA evidence linked the crimes to John Floyd Thomas, who confessed to the murders.
- Died: Georges Carpentier, 81, French boxer, world light heavyweight champion 1920–22

== October 29, 1975 (Wednesday) ==
- U.S. President Ford told the National Press Club that he would veto any legislation for a federal bailout of New York City. The next day, the New York Daily News ran the famous headline "FORD TO CITY: DROP DEAD".

== October 30, 1975 (Thursday) ==
- Seventy-five of the 120 people aboard Inex-Adria Aviopromet Flight 450 were killed when the DC-9 jetliner crashed while attempting to land in Prague, at the end of a flight that had originated in Yugoslavia in the city of Tivat (now in Montenegro). Most of the passengers were Czechoslovak citizens returning from a vacation at the Adriatic Sea. Visibility at Prague Ruzyně Airport was less than 1,500 metres (4,900 ft) and the control tower advised the pilot of Flight 450 that the instrument landing system and precision approach radar on Runway 25 were inoperative. Given the option to attempt a landing anyway, the pilot was cleared for the approach but the crew found that the aircraft was descending into a gorge at the Vltava River near the Czech suburb of Suchdol and was unable to climb out to avoid impact.
- Peter Sutcliffe, who would become known as the "Yorkshire Ripper", committed his first murder, shattering the skull of Wilma McCann with a hammer in the English city of Leeds. He would be arrested on January 2, 1981 and would later be convicted of 13 murders.
- Martha Moxley, 15, vanished after going to a Halloween party at the home of her neighbor, 15-year-old Michael Skakel, in an affluent neighborhood in Greenwich, Connecticut. Her body was found the next day bludgeoned and stabbed with a golf club. Skakel, a wealthy nephew of Ethel Kennedy, would be indicted for Moxley's murder 24 years later. Tried as an adult, Skakel would be convicted in 2002 and given a sentence of 20 years to life.
- Juan Carlos I of Spain became acting Head of State after dictator Francisco Franco conceded that he is too ill to govern.
- Died: Gustav Ludwig Hertz, 88, German physicist, 1925 Nobel Prize laureate

== October 31, 1975 (Friday) ==
- Queen released one of its most celebrated songs, the single Bohemian Rhapsody, initially in the UK. The song was also on the group's album A Night at the Opera, released on November 21, and the single went on sale in the U.S. in December.
- The Racial Discrimination Act 1975 took effect in Australia.
- Tun Mustapha resigned as Chief Minister of Sabah, a state in Malaysia, bringing to an end speculation that he would attempt to lead secession for Sabah to become an independent nation.
- Died: Rolando Masferrer, 57, Cuban exile who published the anti-Castro weekly newspaper Libertad in Miami, was killed by a bomb placed under his car. The murder remains unsolved.
