= November 1975 =

Month of 1975

<<	November 1975					>>
Su	Mo	Tu	We	Th	Fr	Sa
						1
2	3	4	5	6	7	8
9	10	11	12	13	14	15
16	17	18	19	20	21	22
23	24	25	26	27	28	29
30

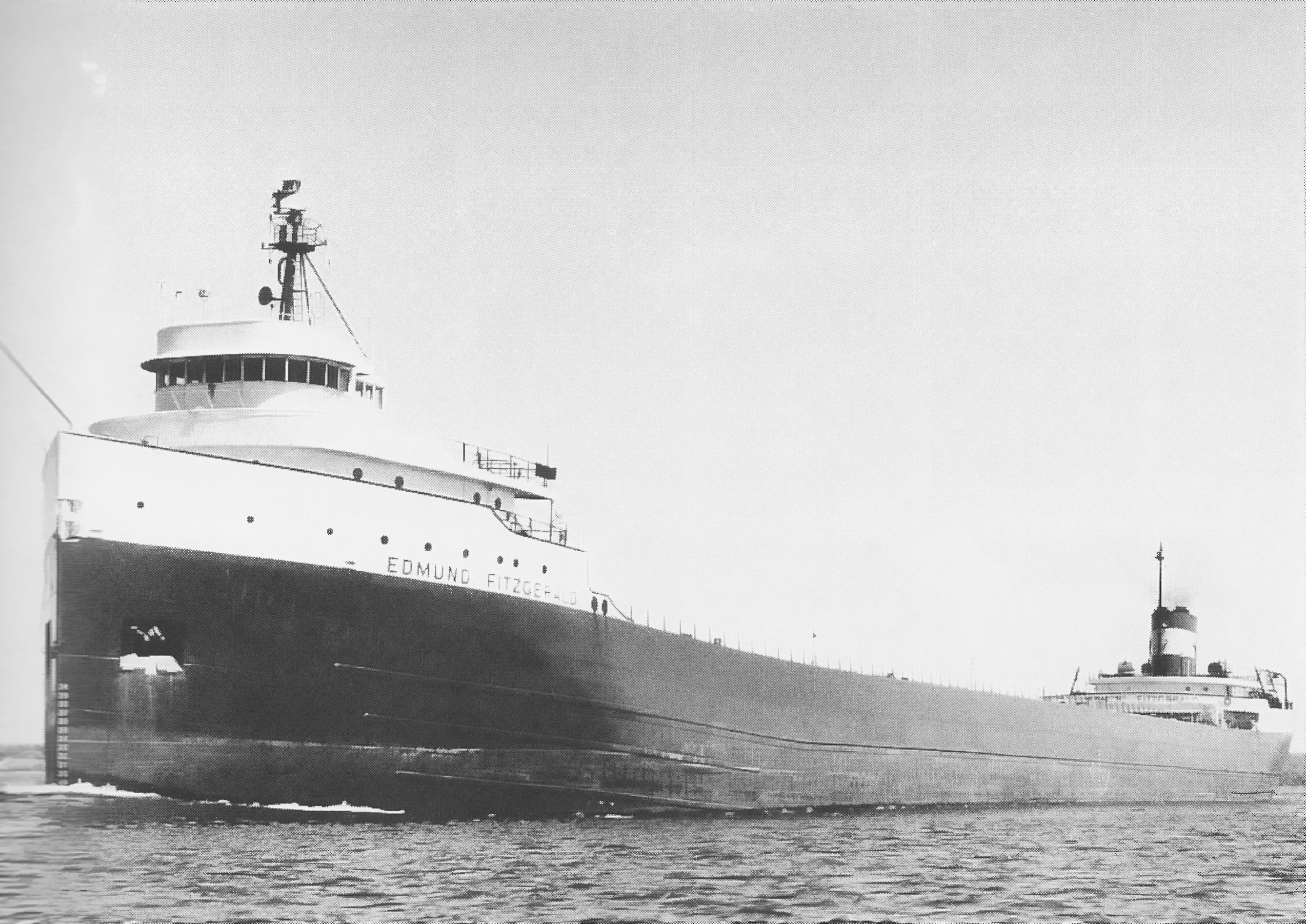
November 10, 1975: All 29 crew die in wreck of the Edmund Fitzgerald

November 11, 1975: Angola independent

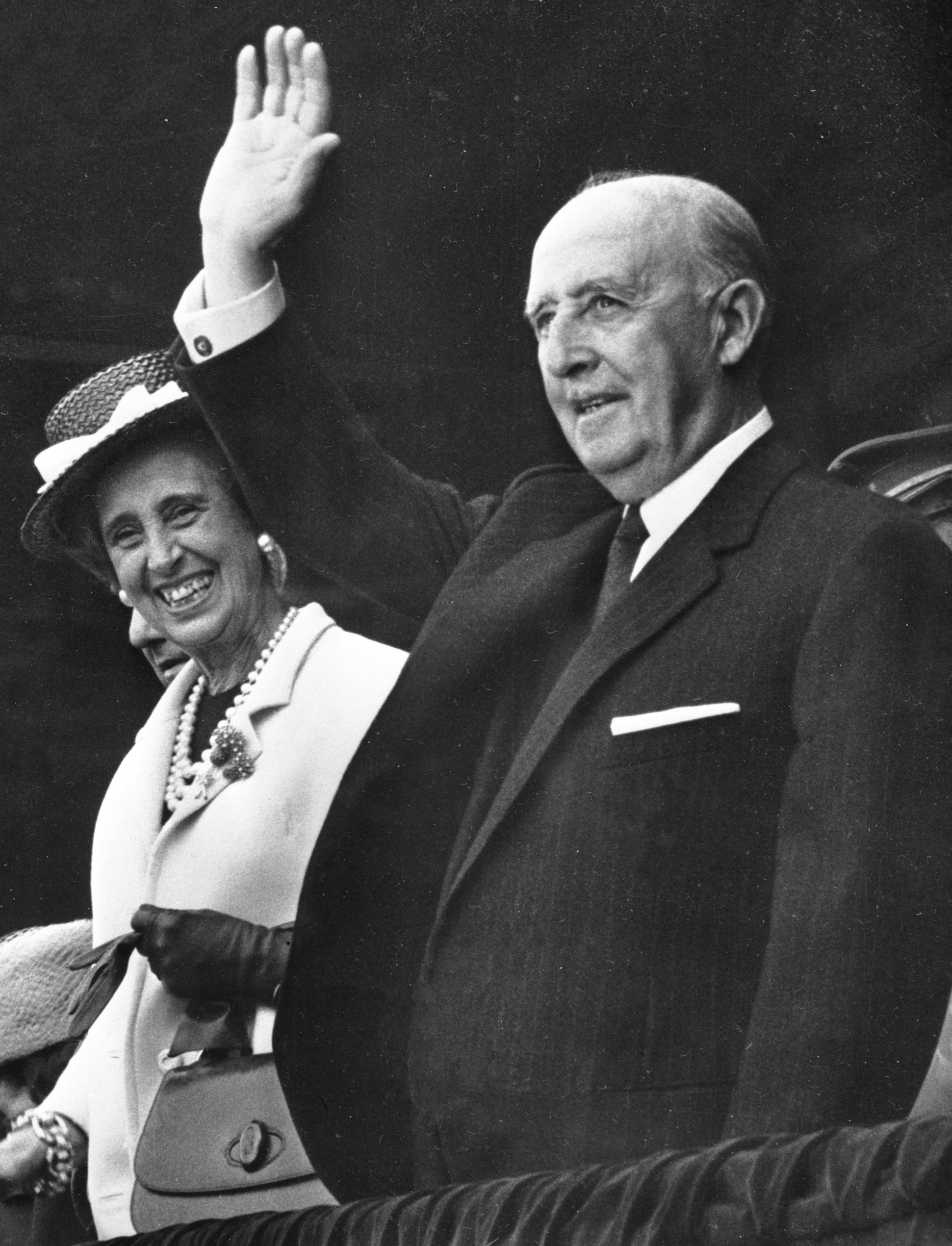
November 20, 1975: 39-year dictatorship of Francisco Franco ends in Spain

November 25, 1975: Suriname independent

November 6, 1975: Morocco and Mauritania divide Spanish Sahara

The following events occurred in November 1975:

== November 1, 1975 (Saturday) ==
- U.S. President Gerald Ford testified in a videotaped deposition for the trial of Lynette Fromme, who had tried to shoot him in September. The tape was not released to the press nor made available to the public.

== November 2, 1975 (Sunday) ==
- An arsonist set fire to one of England's most popular tourist attractions, the Royal Pavilion in Brighton. The 22-year-old assailant hurled a firebomb through the window of the music room of the structure, designed by architect John Nash and constructed as a seaside resort for George IV. Firefighters put out the blaze before it could spread to the rest of the building, known for its combination of various Asian architectural styles, but damage was estimated to be at least £100,000 (US$210,000).
- Died: Pier Paolo Pasolini, 53, Italian film director, was murdered by a 17-year-old boy following a violent argument. Giuseppe Pelosi, who said that Pasolini had made sexual advances toward him, struck Pasolini's skull several times with a piece of wood. Pelosi then took Pasolini's car and used it to run over the film director's body. Pelosi, whose claim of self-defense was rejected, was sentenced to prison for the murder.

== November 3, 1975 (Monday) ==
- General Khaled Mosharraf led a coup d'état against the government of Bangladesh led by President Khondaker Mostaq Ahmad, arrested Army Chief of Staff Ziaur Rahman, and named himself the new Chief. President Mostaq was sent into exile along with the persons who had carried out the assassination of Sheikh Mujibur Rahman on August 15, 1975. Mosharraf would be killed four days later by Ziaur's supporters in a countercoup.
- Before the assassins were sent into exile, but before they left, they arranged the murder of Awami League leaders who were held prisoner at the Dhaka Central Jail. Former members who died were prime ministers Tajuddin Ahmed and Muhammad Mansur Ali, vice president Syed Nazrul Islam, and Minister of Industries and Awami League President A.H.M. Qamaruzzaman. November 3 is now observed annually as "Jail Killing Day".
- The first petroleum pipeline in the United Kingdom opened in Scotland between Cruden Bay and Grangemouth.
- In what was dubbed the "Halloween Massacre", despite occurring three days after Halloween, U.S. President Gerald Ford fired CIA Director William E. Colby and Defense Secretary James R. Schlesinger. Replacing Colby was the U.S. representative in Beijing, future U.S. President George H. W. Bush, while Chief of Staff Donald Rumsfeld replaced Schlesinger.

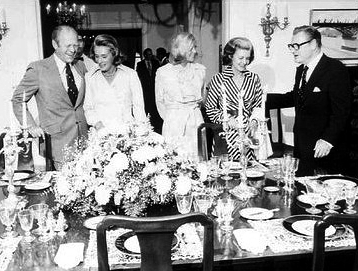
Fords and Rockefellers

- Following the cabinet shakeup, U.S. Vice-president Nelson Rockefeller, expected to be President Ford's running mate in 1976, announced in a letter to Ford that "after much thought I have decided I do not wish my name to enter into your consideration for the upcoming Republican nomination." Rockefeller said that he would serve the remainder of the term to which Spiro Agnew had been elected in 1972; after Agnew's resignation, Ford, and then Rockefeller, had become the only persons to ever be appointed as U.S. vice-president.

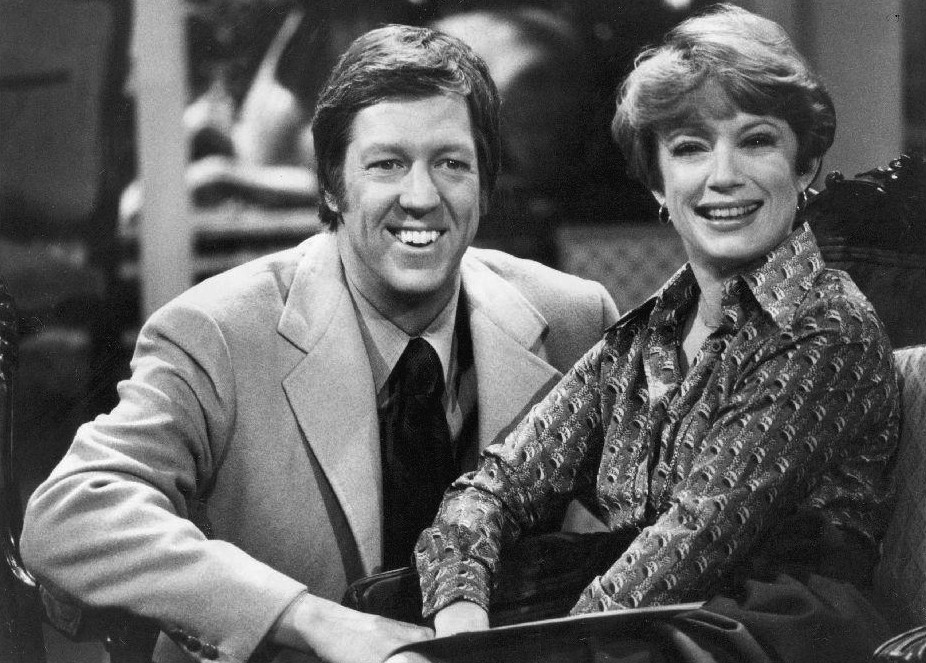
The first GMA hosts

- Good Morning America telecast its first episode, with David Hartman and Nancy Dussault as co-hosts as the ABC network's morning news show. Hartman and Dussault replaced the ten-month-old failed program, AM America, and its team of Bill Beutel and Stephanie Edwards. On the same morning, the television game show The Price Is Right expanded from half an hour to an unprecedented hour-long format, on CBS.
- A partial solar eclipse was visible in southern South America and Antarctica and was the 51st solar eclipse of Solar Saros 123.

== November 4, 1975 (Tuesday) ==
- Cuba's leader Fidel Castro ordered 650 troops to Angola to support the Marxist MPLA government in its war against UNITA and South Africa.
- A furnace explosion caused the deaths of 11 people at the Queen Victoria steelworks at Scunthorpe, Lincolnshire in England, when water accidentally entered a ladle transfer car, filled with molten steel. Four workers died immediately, while another seven eventually died due to their injuries.
- "Nitecaps", hosted by Herb Jepko, became the first nationally syndicated call-in radio show in the United States, broadcast over affiliates of the Mutual Broadcasting System. On February 11, 1964, Jepko had pioneered the concept of a radio show where listeners could call on the telephone and the conversations could be heard over the air.
- Died:
  - Francis Dvornik, 82, Czech historian
  - Audrey Williams, 52, American musician, widow of Hank Williams and mother of Hank Williams Jr., died of congestive heart failure in Nashville at her home, which she was attempting to convert into a museum to honor her late husband.

== November 5, 1975 (Wednesday) ==
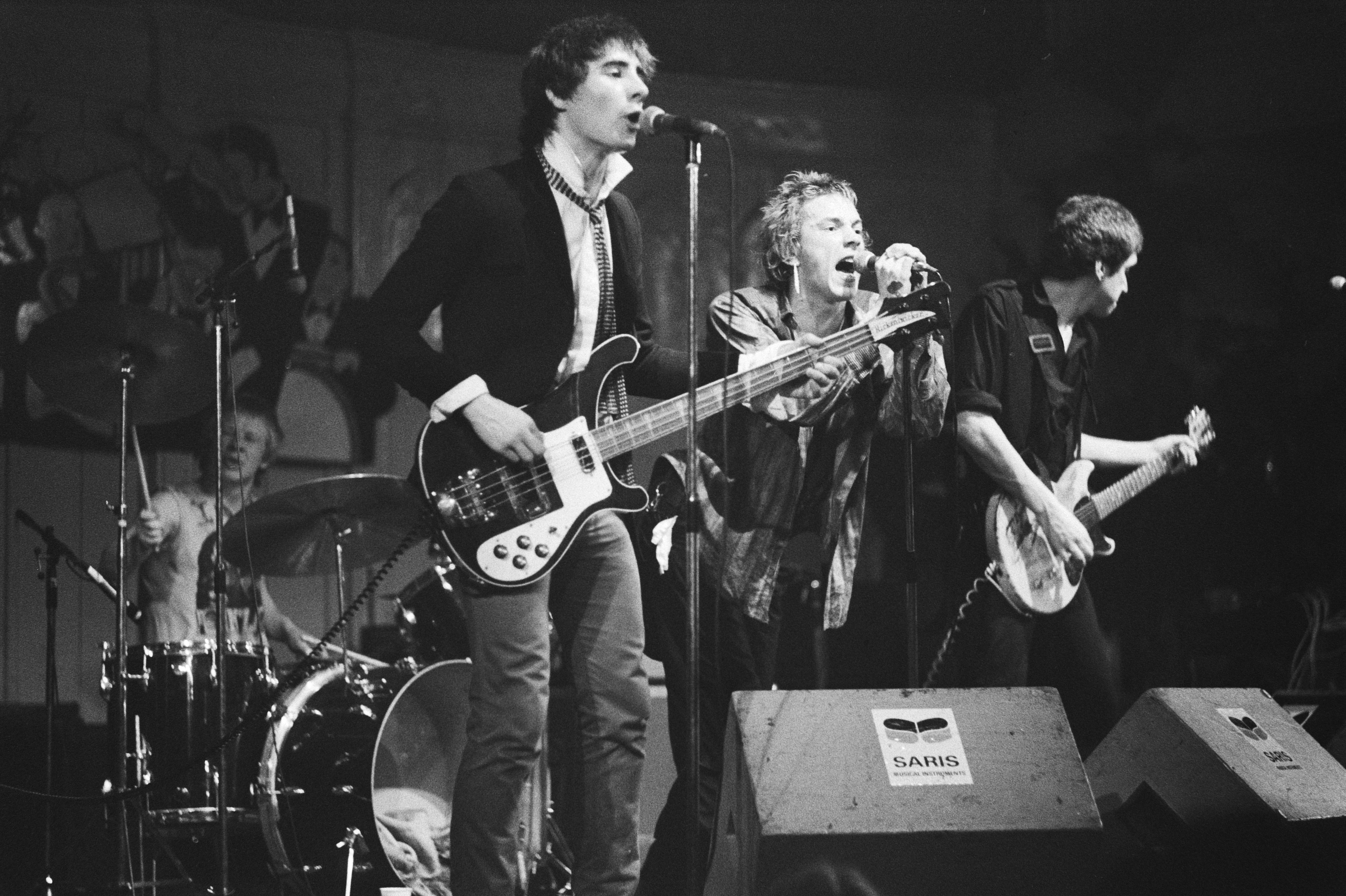
Sex Pistols

- The Sex Pistols gave their first public concert and introduced "punk rock" to the United Kingdom. Singer John Lydon, billed as Johnny Rotten, was backed by Glen Matlock, Steve Jones and Paul Cook in a performance at the St. Martin's School of Art opening for Bazooka Joe. The Pistols were influenced by the music of an American group, the New York Dolls. They covered The Who, Faces and even "Stepping Stone" by the Monkees. Flyer (designed by the Bazooka Joe bassist soon to be future Adam Ant) and anniversary of the event lists it as Nov 6, 1975
- The United States announced that it was withdrawing from the International Labour Organization. When the departure became effective on November 6, 1977, the ILO lost 25% of its income; the U.S. would rejoin the ILO on February 18, 1980.
- Travis Walton, a 22-year-old logger, was working in the Apache-Sitgreaves National Forest with six co-workers near Snowflake, Arizona, when he suddenly disappeared. Walton was found five days later and said that he had been abducted by extraterrestrials. His book, The Walton Experience (1978), would become the basis for a film, Fire in the Sky (1993).
- Died:
  - Annette Kellerman, 89, Australian swimmer and actress
  - Edward Tatum, 65, American geneticist, Nobel Prize winner 1958
  - Agustín Tosco, 45, Argentine union leader and rebel against the Peron government, died of bacterial encephalitis while registered under a false name at a hospital in Buenos Aires. Tosco had been ill for months but, because he was in hiding, had not sought treatment.
  - Lionel Trilling, 70, American literary critic
  - Lieutenant General Beqir Balluku, 58, former Minister of Defense of Albania, was executed by firing squad along with Major General Petrit Dume, 55, the former Chief of Staff of the Albanian Armed Forces, and Lieutenant General Hito Çako, 52, the former chief of the Albanian Army political directorate. All three had been removed from office in 1974 and convicted of attempting a coup d'état against Albania's Communist First Secretary, Enver Hoxha.

== November 6, 1975 (Thursday) ==
- The "Green March" began as 524,000 unarmed civilians crossed the border from Morocco into the Spanish Sahara, despite warnings from Spain that they would be shot. After leaving Tarfaya, the group halted after crossing the border and camped, rather than approach the defensive line and minefields set up by Spain. Spain would agree to relinquish the territory eight days later.
- Khondaker Mostaq Ahmad, who had become President of Bangladesh in August after the assassination of Sheikh Mujibur Rahman, was overthrown in a coup and replaced by Chief Justice Abu Sadat Mohammad Sayem. The coup leaders freed Major General Ziaur Rahman, the Chief of Army Staff who was the strongman for the regime and who had been imprisoned two days earlier.
- Died:
  - Ernst Hanfstaengl, 88, German confidant of Adolf Hitler who defected to the Allies and then provided information on Nazi leaders to the United States.
  - Shimun XXI Eshai, 67, Patriarch of the Assyrian Church of the East since 1920, and leader of Assyrian Christians, was assassinated at his home in San Jose, California, bringing an end to the hereditary succession of the "Shimun line" that had existed since 1600.

== November 7, 1975 (Friday) ==
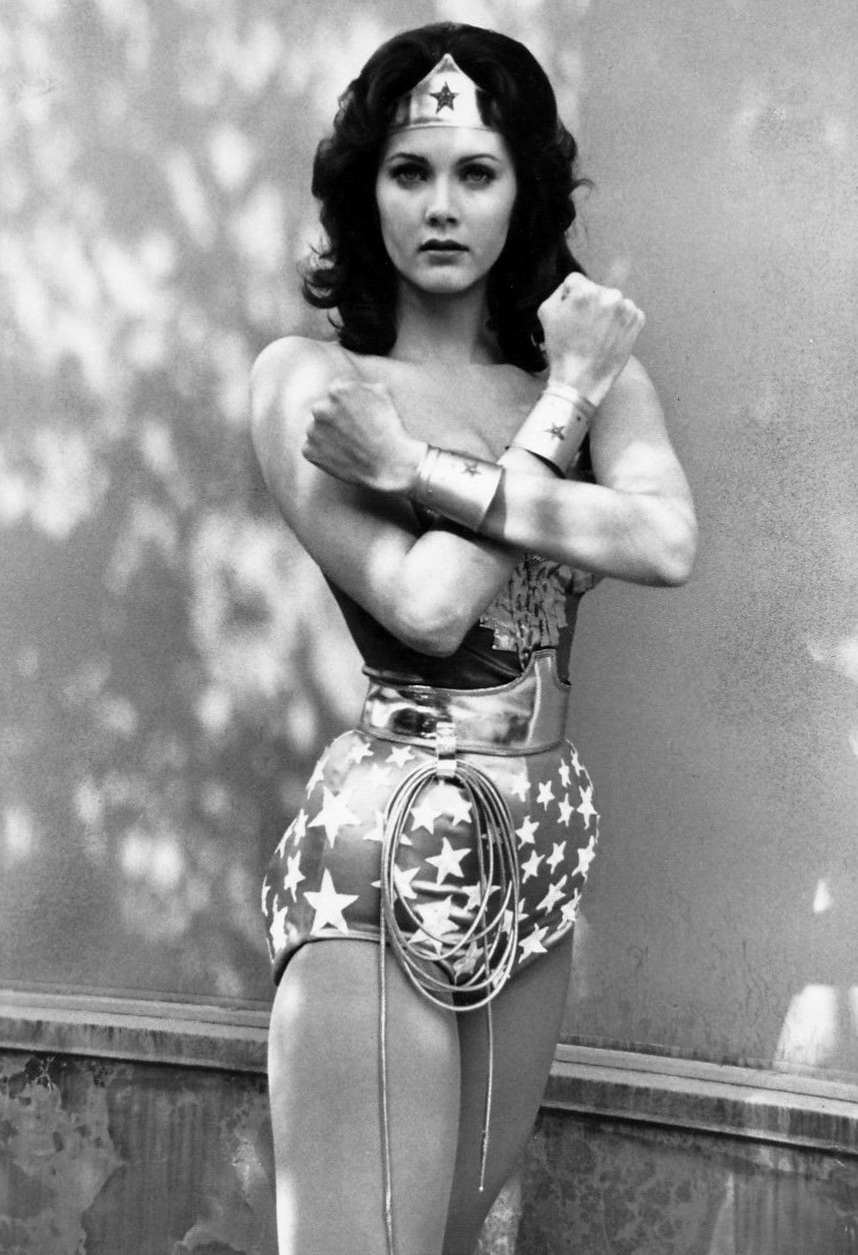
Lynda Carter as Wonder Woman

- In the U.S., the ABC television network aired The New Original Wonder Woman, the pilot for a new series, as part of its The ABC Friday Night Movie presentation. A previous pilot, Wonder Woman, had aired on ABC on March 12, 1974, with Cathy Lee Crosby in the title role, but had mediocre ratings. The new pilot featured Lynda Carter and more consistent with the comic book franchise. Interest in the show with Carter was so great that two more TV movies were produced, and eventually the television series, Wonder Woman, produced by Douglas S. Cramer and starring Carter, would debut as a mid-season replacement on April 21, 1976.
- A vapor cloud explosion at a petroleum cracking facility in Geleen, Netherlands killed 14 people and injured 109, with fires continuing to burn for five days.
- Netherlands industrialist Tiede Herrema was released unharmed in Monasterevin in Ireland, after having been kidnapped and held captive for 36 days.
- Four days before Angola was to become independent, the first two shiploads of Cuban soldiers, each carrying 4,000 troops, tanks and equipment, departed from Cuba.
- A team of psychiatrists concluded that former kidnap victim turned criminal, Patty Hearst, was competent to stand trial.
- 29-year-old Alexandra "Sasha" Bruce Michaelides, daughter of American diplomat David K. E. Bruce, was found with a gunshot wound to the head under a cedar tree on the grounds of the Bruce estate near Brookneal, Virginia. She would die on November 9.
- Died: Vilna Jorgen Morpurgo (born Adele Vilhelma Ludvikke Larsen Nilsen), 75, Scandinavian-American painter and sculptor

== November 8, 1975 (Saturday) ==
- Shortly before midnight, Moscow time, the crew of the Soviet frigate Storozhevoy mutinied, as second-in-command Valery Sablin locked up Captain Anatoly Putorny, then seized control of the vessel. The mutiny, which would fail, would inspire the best-selling Tom Clancy novel, and later a film, The Hunt for Red October. Captain 3rd Rank Sablin would be convicted of treason and be executed on August 3, 1976.
- Daniel "Rudy" Ruettiger, a 5-foot-6-inch (1.68 m), 165-pound (75 kg) senior walk-on to the Notre Dame football team, who had never gotten to take the field, was allowed to come into the lineup in the final 27 seconds of a game against Georgia Tech. Ruettiger broke through the line and sacked the Tech quarterback who, coincidentally, was also a Rudy— Rudy Allen. Ruettiger's story of determination would later be made into the film Rudy.
- The first 164 Cuban troops arrived in Angola, as two turboprop airplanes, carrying the MININT Special Forces, landed at Luanda. On the same day, a force of FNLA and Zaire troops invaded Cabinda, an Angolan enclave that was separated from the rest of the nation.
- Born: Ángel Corella, Spanish ballet dancer, in Madrid

== November 9, 1975 (Sunday) ==
- News of the mutiny on the frigate Storozhevoy reached the KGB, and Vice Admiral Anatoly Kosov ordered the Soviet Baltic Fleet to locate, chase and intercept the ship as it sped away from the U.S.S.R.
- As Spain announced that it would not fight for the Western Sahara, Morocco's King Hassan II called off the "Green March" and ordered the 200,000 marchers to return home. In a nationally broadcast address, the King said, "Spain is not only a friendly country, it also is a neighborly and fraternal nation."
- Died:
  - Hugh Auchincloss Brown, 96, American electrical engineer
  - Wilbur H. Cramblet, 83, American college football coach, professor and college president, died of heart failure.
  - Ruby Pickett Kelley, 62, wife of FBI Director Clarence M. Kelley
  - Marie Rodell, 63, American literary agent and author

== November 10, 1975 (Monday) ==
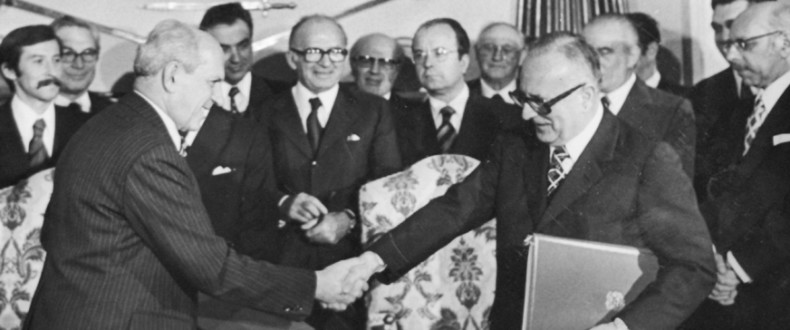
November 10, 1975: Signing of the Osimo Treaty

- The Treaty of Osimo was signed between Italy and Yugoslavia, resolving the dispute over Trieste, claimed by both nations. Under the agreement, 233 km^{2} (90 sq mi) and 302,000 residents went to Italy, while the other 340 km^{2} (130 sq mi) and 73,500 inhabitants went to Yugoslavia.
- On the eve of Angola's independence from Portugal, the Marxist MPLA was able to defeat the FNLA in the fight for control of the capital, Luanda, effectively making Agostinho Neto the first President of the new nation, rather than FNLA Commander Holden Roberto.
- By a vote of 72–35 (with 32 abstentions), United Nations General Assembly Resolution 3379 was approved, equating Zionism with racism. Sixteen years later, on December 16, 1991, the General Assembly would adopt another resolution revoking the 1975 measure, with 111 nations approving the recission.
- The freighter SS Edmund Fitzgerald sank at 7:20 pm during a storm in Whitefish Bay on Lake Superior, taking the 29-member crew with it. Singer Gordon Lightfoot would later write a ballad about the ship's demise. As a result of the disaster, many changes were made in safety and electronics for ships, making the Edmund Fitzgerald the last major shipwreck on the Great Lakes. Each year on November 10, the Mariners Church of Detroit rings 30 bells, 29 for those lost on the Edmund Fitzgerald, and one for all the other lives lost in the thousands of wrecks before her.
- Lev Leshchenko revived "Den Pobedy" ("Victory Day"), one of the most popular World War II songs in the Soviet Union, on a nationally televised concert performed live from the Kremlin Palace of Congresses in Moscow.
- Died:
  - Manuel Aznar Zubigaray, 81, Spanish diplomat and journalist
  - Wilder D. Baker, 85, United States Navy vice admiral
  - William Hardcastle, 57, British broadcaster and journalist
  - William B. Kouwenhoven, 89, American electrical engineer, inventor of the cardiac defibrillator
  - Leo J. Sheridan, 78, former United States Ambassador to Ireland

== November 11, 1975 (Tuesday) ==
- Angola became independent after five centuries of being ruled as a colony of Portugal. The last High Commissioner, Admiral Leonel Cardoso, had ordered the Portuguese flag lowered at sundown the evening before, and that the ships, transporting the remaining Portuguese troops, leave Angolan waters by midnight. At Luanda, poet Agostinho Neto was sworn in as president.
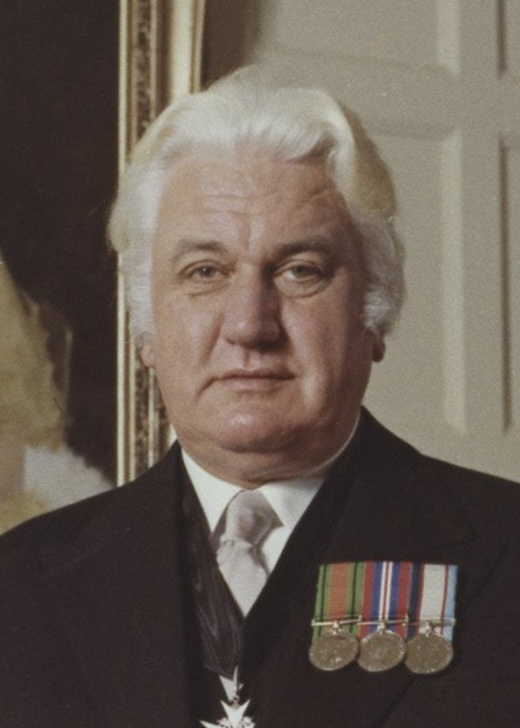
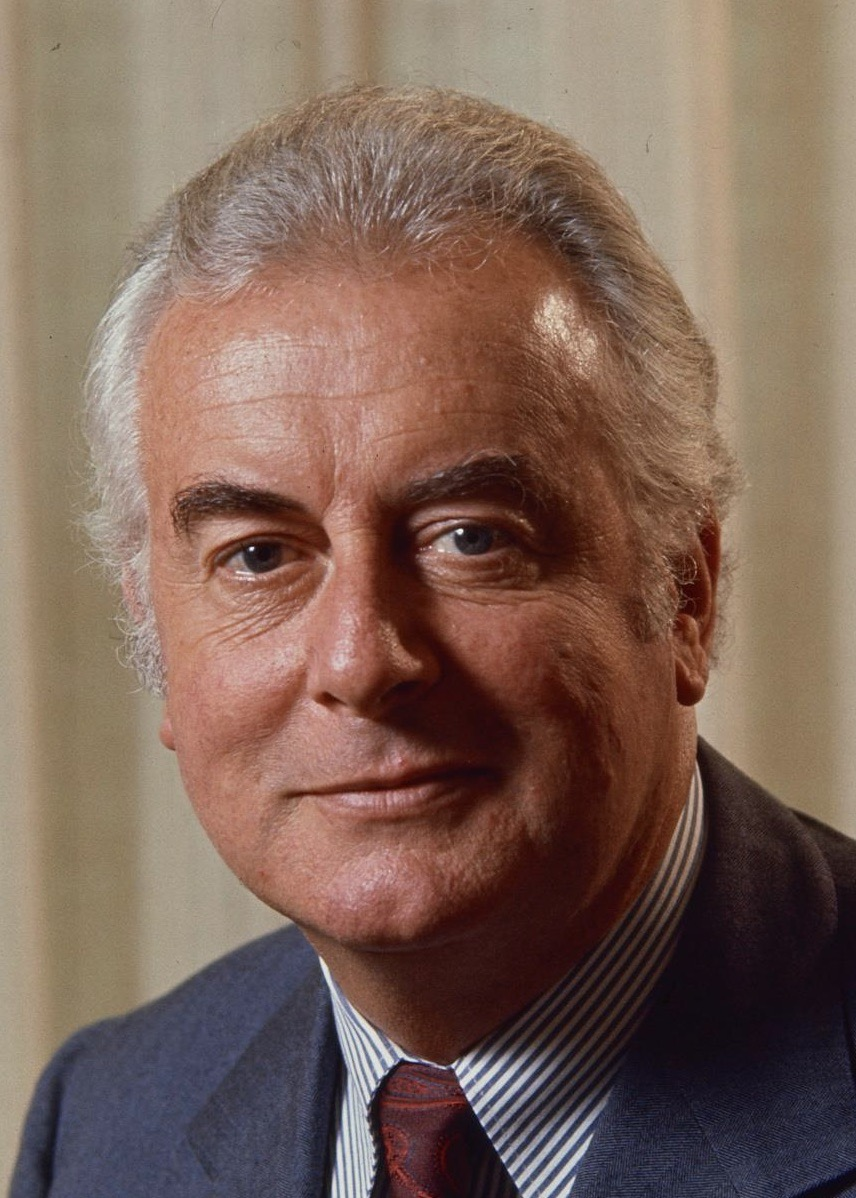
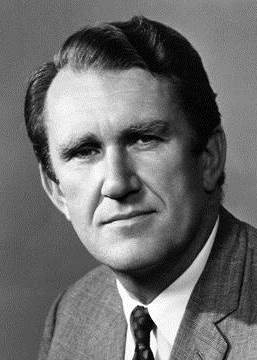
Governor General Kerr, Prime Minister Whitlam and replacement Malcom Fraser
- Gough Whitlam was dismissed from his position as Prime Minister of Australia by the nation's Governor-General, Sir John Kerr, who then replaced the Labor Party's Whitlam with the Leader of the Opposition from the opposing Liberal Party, Malcolm Fraser, prompting a constitutional crisis. Kerr, though nominally the head of state acting on behalf of Queen Elizabeth II, rather than the head of the government, used a power granted to him in Section 64 of the Constitution of Australia.
- Died:
  - Clinton Anderson, 80, former United States Secretary of Agriculture and United States Senator from New Mexico, died of a stroke.
  - Richard Paul Pavlick, 88, retired postal worker who had conspired to assassinate U.S. President-elect John F. Kennedy on December 11, 1960.

== November 12, 1975 (Wednesday) ==
- Andrei Sakharov was denied permission to leave the Soviet Union to accept the 1975 Nobel Peace Prize. Sakharov, a nuclear physicist who had overseen the development of the hydrogen bomb for the U.S.S.R., had later become the nation's most famous dissident. An exit visa was denied him on grounds that "he possesses state secrets". On the same day, author Vladimir I. Maximov was stripped of his citizenship by the Soviet Union; Maximov was living in France at the time.

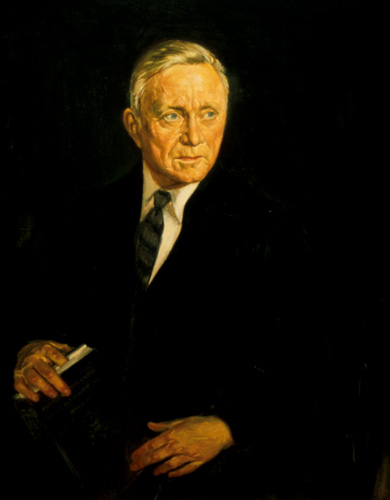
Douglas

- William O. Douglas, whose 36 years as a justice of the United States Supreme Court remains the longest tenure ever, retired at the age of 77. Douglas, who had been debilitated by a stroke on December 31, said in a statement that "I have been unable to shoulder my full share of the burden." Douglas had been on the Court since April 17, 1939.
- Alabama Governor George C. Wallace became the tenth person to declare his candidacy for the Democratic Party nomination for the 1976 U.S. presidential race. Wallace had run as a third-party candidate in 1968 and had been running for the nomination in 1972 when he was paralyzed by an assassin.
- Overseas National Airways Flight 32 took off from Kennedy International Airport in New York on a flight to Frankfurt, and encountered a large flock of seagulls on the runway. The birds were sucked into the number 3 engine, causing a fire that spread to the rest of the jet. Remarkably, all 139 of the people on board escaped without injury, in part because they were all ONA employees who had had emergency training. The plane, a DC-10 jumbo jet that had cost forty million dollars, was destroyed. ONA would go bankrupt three years later.

== November 13, 1975 (Thursday) ==
- The 1973 agreement, that had ended the "Cod War" between the United Kingdom and Iceland, expired after two years. Under the pact, the two nations had agreed on fishing rights in the best fishing waters, located within 50 miles of Iceland. With no agreement in place, Iceland attempted again to bar British fishing, and the disagreement would go on for seven months.
- At the Palais Theatre in Melbourne, The Australian Ballet premiered The Merry Widow, an adaptation by choreographer Ronald Hynd of the 1905 Franz Lehár operetta Die lustige Witwe.
- Died:
  - R. C. Sherriff, 79, English playwright
  - Olga Bergholz, 62, Soviet poet

== November 14, 1975 (Friday) ==
- Spain abandoned the Western Sahara to be divided between Morocco and Mauritania effective February 28, 1976.
- The siege of Portugal's Sao Bento Palace ended after 36 hours. On Wednesday, a group of 20,000 construction workers surrounded the building, trapping 200 legislators, including Prime Minister Jose Pinheiro de Azevedo and two of his ministers. The siege ended after the government agreed to raise the pay of the employees.
- Israeli troops pulled back from their positions in Egypt's Sinai Peninsula in the first step of carrying out the agreement that had been made in September, and turned over the 450 square mile Ras Suhr oil fields, captured in 1967, to United Nations control. In return for giving up the fields, the U.S. agreed to pay Israel $350,000,000 for loss of revenue from the sale of oil.
- Born:
  - Travis Barker, American musician, drummer for the band Blink-182, in Fontana, California
  - Gary Vaynerchuk, Belarusian-American entrepreneur, wine critic, and Internet personality, in Babruysk, Byelorussian SSR, Soviet Union

== November 15, 1975 (Saturday) ==
- The "Group of Six" (G-6) industrialized nations was formed at its first summit at the Château de Rambouillet in France. The leaders of France, West Germany, Japan, Italy, the United Kingdom and the United States began their economic summit at a castle 30 miles from Paris.

== November 16, 1975 (Sunday) ==
- The Third Cod War began between the United Kingdom and Iceland, and would last until June 1976.

== November 17, 1975 (Monday) ==
- Soyuz 20, an uncrewed spacecraft, was launched by the Soviet Union in order to test the endurance of the vehicle and a biological payload. It remained in orbit for 90 days and returned on February 16, 1976.

== November 18, 1975 (Tuesday) ==
- A total lunar eclipse was visible in both Americas, Europe, Africa, Asia and western Australia, and was the 21st lunar eclipse of Lunar Saros 135.
- Eldridge Cleaver, former leader of the Black Panthers group, returned to the United States after seven years in exile. Cleaver, living in Paris, had fled the U.S. in 1968 after being charged with violating parole and for having fled a conviction on assault with intent to murder. Cleaver would be jailed until 1980, with a plea agreement dropping the attempted murder charge and being sentenced to time served for the other charges.
- Born:
  - Anthony McPartlin, British TV presenter, actor and singer (Ant and Dec), in Newcastle upon Tyne
  - David Ortiz, Dominican-born MLB designated hitter, in Santo Domingo

== November 19, 1975 (Wednesday) ==
- The first federal special education legislation the Education for All Handicapped Children Act, was passed by the U.S. Senate, 87 to 7, after being approved by the House the day before, 404 to 7. The law provided for the equal right of public education to all children, regardless of disability. President Ford would sign the bill into law on November 29.
- One Flew Over the Cuckoo's Nest, which would win the Academy Award for Best Film, was released nationwide in the United States. Directed by Miloš Forman, the film starred Jack Nicholson as a mental patient, and Louise Fletcher as a sadistic nurse.
- Born: Sushmita Sen, Indian beauty queen and actress selected as Miss Universe in 1994; in Hyderabad

== November 20, 1975 (Thursday) ==
- The release of a report by the U.S. Senate Intelligence Committee confirmed that the U.S. Central Intelligence Agency had tried twice to assassinate Cuban dictator Fidel Castro, and once to poison Congo Premier Patrice Lumumba, and that it had supplied aid to insurgents who later assassinated South Vietnam's President Ngo Dinh Diem and Dominican Republic dictator Rafael Trujillo. The report emphasized that "No foreign leaders were killed as a result of assassination plots initiated by officials of the United States." Lumumba had been killed later by political rivals in the Congo.
- Former California Governor Ronald Reagan entered the race for the Republican presidential nomination, challenging incumbent President Gerald Ford. Afterward, Reagan flew to Miami, where he was confronted at his motel by a 20-year-old man holding a pistol, which turned out to be a plastic toy replica of a .45 caliber revolver.
- Dr. Heinrich Schuetz was sentenced to ten years in prison after being convicted of war crimes in Munich, West Germany. In 1942, Dr. Schuetz, a colonel in the SS, had injected bacteria into eleven Roman Catholic priests imprisoned at the Dachau concentration camp as part of a medical experiment.
- Born:
  - Dierks Bentley, American country singer, as Frederick Dierks Bentley in Phoenix, Arizona;
  - Davey Havok, American rock musician, frontman of AFI, as David Allen Passaro in Rochester, New York
- Died:
  - Spanish dictator Francisco Franco, 82, died in Madrid, effectively marking the end of the dictatorship established following the Spanish Civil War and the beginning of Spain's transition to democracy.
  - Tokushichi Mishima, 82, Japanese inventor and engineer who invented the alloy MKM steel (Mishima Kizumi Magnetic Steel) from aluminum and nickel steel.

== November 21, 1975 (Friday) ==
- Antuilio Ortiz, who had become the first person to hijack an American airline flight to Cuba, was arrested by U.S. authorities, 14 years after his May 1, 1961 commandeering of a National Airlines plane to Havana. Ortiz, who had remained in Cuba and lived comfortably for his first two years, had been incarcerated several times after trying to leave the Communist nation. He would spend another four years in a Florida prison, a relatively light sentence because there had been no federal law against hijacking at the time of Ortiz's crime.
- Born: Chris Moneymaker, American poker player, 2003 World Series of Poker winner and the first to have qualified for the Series at an online poker site, causing a change in the game called "The Moneymaker effect"; in Atlanta

== November 22, 1975 (Saturday) ==
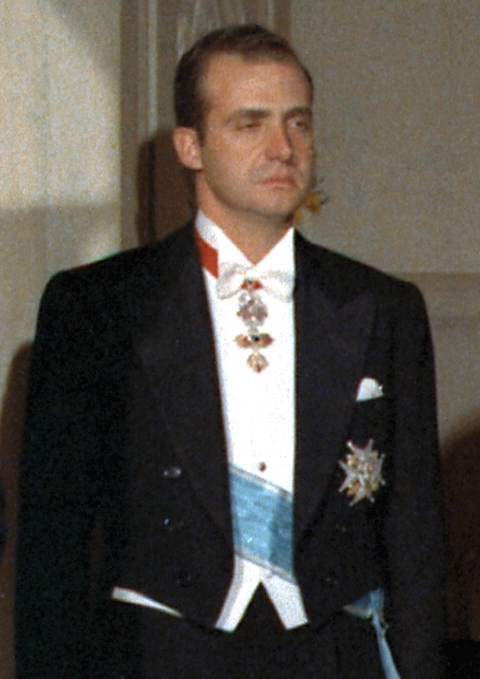
King Juan Carlos

- Juan Carlos de Borbon was administered an oath as the first King of Spain in 44 years, two days after the death of dictator Francisco Franco, the third restoration of the House of Bourbon in the country. His reign would continue until his abdication on June 19, 2014.
- The U.S. Navy missile cruiser USS Belknap (CG-26) collided with the aircraft carrier USS John F. Kennedy (CV-67), killing seven people on the Belknap and one on the Kennedy. Captain Walter R. Shafer of USS Belknap would be acquitted of charges of negligence in a court-martial six months later.
- Born: Yusaku Maezawa, Japanese billionaire entrepreneur, in Kamagaya

== November 23, 1975 (Sunday) ==
- Spanish dictator Francisco Franco's funeral was held in Madrid.
- The Edmonton Eskimos won the Grey Cup and the championship of the Canadian Football League, beating the Montreal Alouettes, 9–8, in a game that went down to the last play. With 0:45 left and trailing 9–7, Montreal was on the 19 yard line to kick what would have won the game 10–9, but a bad snap, bad placement and bad kick caused Don Sweet's kick to go wide right and through the end zone for a single.

== November 24, 1975 (Monday) ==
- Basque terrorists assassinated Antonio Echeverria, the mayor of the Spanish city of Oyarzun, at his home. Echeverria had fired two city councilmen after they had joined a protest against the September 27 executions of five other terrorists.
- Born: Lee Wan Wah, Malaysian badminton player, 2007 and 2008 Asian champion; in Ipoh

== November 25, 1975 (Tuesday) ==
- Suriname, formerly Dutch Guiana, was granted independence from the Kingdom of the Netherlands. The previous Governor, Johan Ferrier, became first President of the South American nation and Henck Arron became its first Prime Minister.
- In his first major act as Spain's monarch, King Juan Carlos abolished the death penalty for all prisoners awaiting execution, and issued a general pardon of political prisoners, with the exception of 500 people arrested under the antiterrorism law passed in September. About 9,000 prisoners would be released.
- Rebel paratrooper units attempted a military coup in Portugal, seizing four air force bases throughout the country. Lt. Col. António Ramalho Eanes led a countercoup. Major Otelo Saraiva de Carvalho and 200 coup participants were arrested; Eanes would defeat Carvalho in two subsequent presidential elections.

== November 26, 1975 (Wednesday) ==
- Quick action, by the pilot of an American Airlines DC-10, averted a mid-air collision with a TWA Lockheed Tri-Star that could have killed 308 people. Captain Guy Eby sent the DC-10 into a dive, injuring 24 of the 194 people on board, after being alerted by an air traffic controller that the two jumbo jets were rapidly approaching each other. American Airlines Flight 182 was on its way from Chicago to Newark, while TWA Flight 37 was going from Philadelphia to Los Angeles with 114 on board. The two jets were both cruising at 35,000 feet when the encounter took place over Carleton, Michigan. At 7:22 pm local time, a controller at the Cleveland ATC center gave the order "American 182, descend immediately to 330". The subsequent investigation concluded that the error lay with one of the controllers, who had been aware that both jets were at the same altitude, but failed to resolve the problem, nor inform the person who took over from him one minute before the dive order was given. AA 182 made an emergency landing at Detroit, while TWA 37 continued to Philadelphia without the passengers being aware of their brush with death.
- Reversing a prior decision to avoid bailing out New York City from bankruptcy, President Ford proposed a federal program for up to $2.3 billion in short-term loans.
- In Sacramento, California, Lynette Fromme became the first person to be convicted under a federal law against attempted assassination of a United States President. The jury of 8 women and 4 men deliberated for 19 hours over a three-day period before returning a guilty verdict. The jurors, believed to have been in fear of revenge from the "Manson family" and other followers of Charles Manson, declined interviews and photographs.

== November 27, 1975 (Thursday) ==
- Ross McWhirter, co-founder of the Guinness Book of Records, was killed by the Provisional Irish Republican Army after confronting two men at his home in North London. A month earlier, McWhirter had offered a $102,000 reward for the capture of the perpetrators of IRA house bombings that had killed eight people.
- The United Kingdom announced plans for limited home rule for Scotland and Wales, with each to have their own elected unicameral legislatures and control over local government services, in what was seen as a plan to thwart independence movements in both countries.
- Born: Martín Gramática, Argentine native who became an NFL placekicker; in Buenos Aires

== November 28, 1975 (Friday) ==
East Timor

- Portuguese Timor declared its independence from Portugal as the Democratic Republic of East Timor, with FRETILIN leader Francisco Xavier do Amaral as the nation's first President. On December 7, neighboring Indonesia would invade from its half of the island, the province of West Timor, and conquer the fledgling nation, killing 100,000 people, and annex it as Indonesia's 27th province. East Timor would finally regain its independence on May 20, 2002.

== November 29, 1975 (Saturday) ==
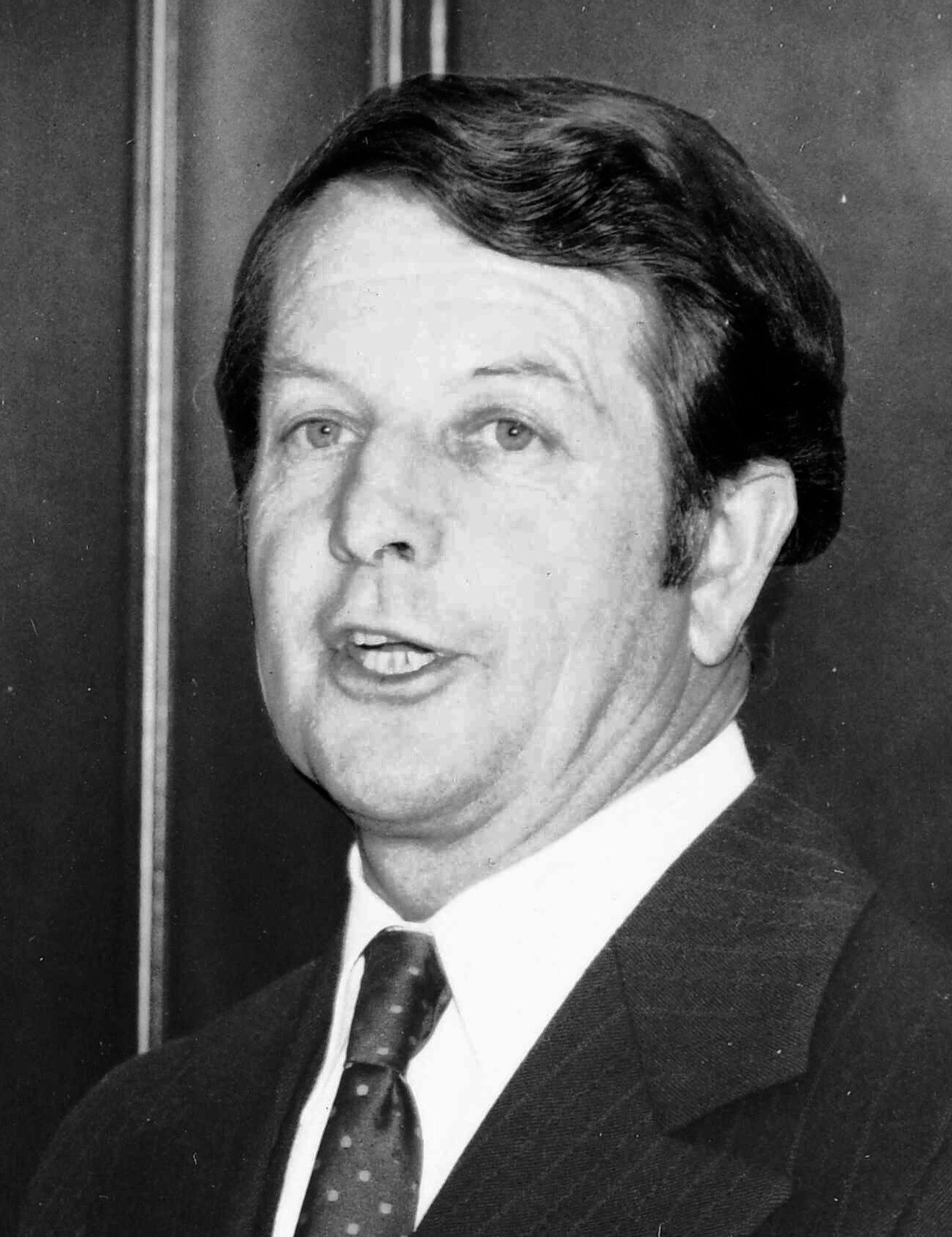
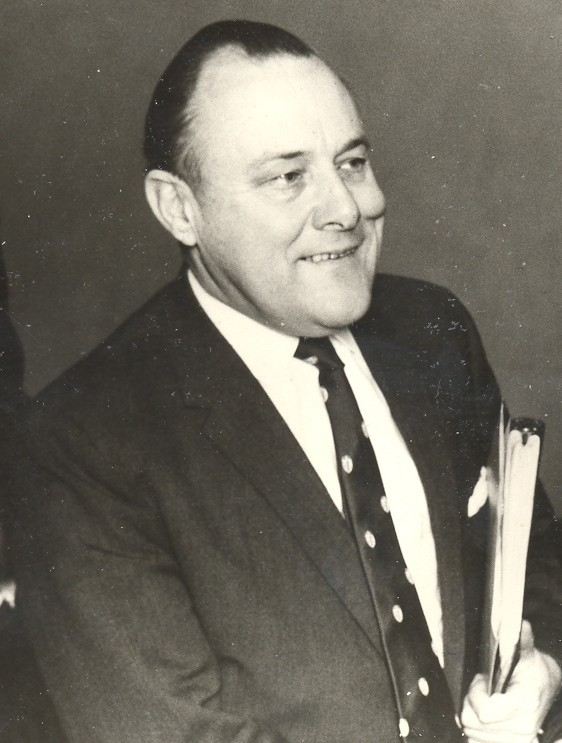
New Zealand's Bill Rowling and Rob Muldoon
- In elections in New Zealand, the Labour Party, led by Prime Minister Bill Rowling, lost its 55–32 majority in the House of Representatives, with 23 seats going to the National Party, headed by Rob Muldoon. The result was an exact reversal, with the Nationals having the 55-32 control of the House.
- Died: Graham Hill, 46, English race car driver, twice Formula One World Champion (1962 and 1968), and 1966 Indianapolis 500 winner, was killed along with five other people when his Piper Aztec airplane crashed into trees before coming to a rest on a golf course at the London suburb of Barnet. Hill's plane was apparently attempting to land at a small airfield in Elstree.

== November 30, 1975 (Sunday) ==
Benin, formerly Dahomey
- By decree of President Mathieu Kerekou, the name of the African nation of Dahomey was changed to the People's Republic of Benin.
- Two days after the independence group FRETILIN had declared the independence of East Timor, the rival political parties UDT and APODETI issued a Declaration of "the independence and integration of the whole former colonial Territory of Portuguese Timor with the Republic of Indonesia, which is in accordance with the real wishes of the entire people of Portuguese Timor."
- A nuclear meltdown took place at Unit 1 of the Leningrad nuclear power plant in the Soviet Union when 32 fuel assemblies were damaged during the bringing back online of the reactor following maintenance and radioactive steam was released over the Gulf of Finland.
