= Pak Chinhong =

Korean independence activist (1914–?)

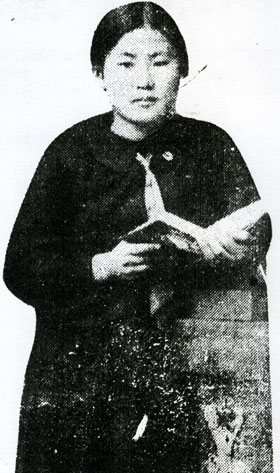
- Born: 1914; Myongchon County, Korea, Empire of Japan
- Died: unknown North Korea
- Education: Dongduk Girls’ High School
- Occupation: activist
- Known for: leader in the 1930s under Japanese colonial rule.
- Spouse(s): Yi Chaeyu, Kim Tae-jun
- Children: three

Pak Chinhong (Korean: 박진홍; 1914 - ?) was a leader of the Korean labour and independence movement in the 1930s under Japanese colonial rule. She spent ten years of her life in prison in the 1930s. After liberation, she was a delegate to the Supreme People's Assembly of North Korea.

== Life ==
Pak Chinhong was born in Myongchon County, Korea, Empire of Japan. She went with her parents when they gave up their poor rural and moved to Keijō (Seoul) in 1928. She was fifteen years old and she attended Dongduk Girls’ High School, established by the Cheondoist religion, She paid for her tuition by working as a live-in tutor. Dongduk Girls’ High School was a “national school” that was involved in the March First Movement. Its founder Son Byeong-hee had been arrested and replaced in 1919 for being involved in the independence movement.

Pak was a literary student who dreamed of becoming a writer. Pak was ranked first in the entire school and one source says she was considered the cleverest student since the school was founded.

== Activism ==
Pak Chinhong and Lee Hyo-jeong, a friend of hers at Dongduk Girls’ High School were anti-Japanese socialists. Lee Hyo-jeong was a keen activist who was also a good student.

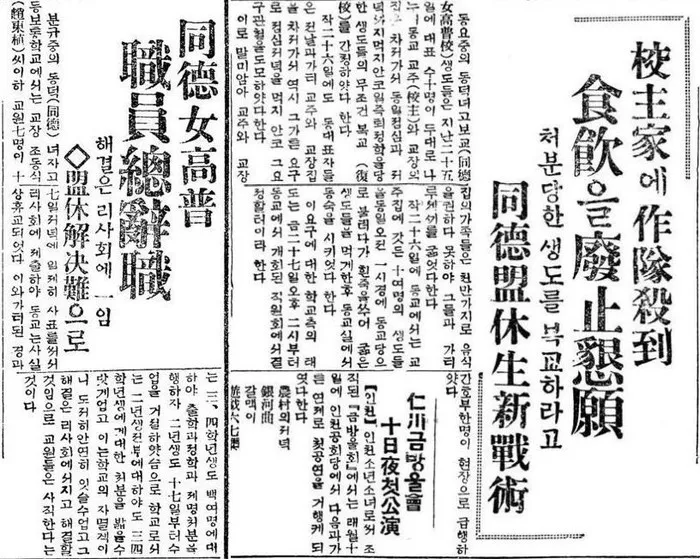
June 1931, Declaration of resignation by Dongduk alliance teachers and students (left) and a hunger strike by students (on the right)

Her history teacher, Lee Gwan-sul, was a strong influence. Starting in her third year, she formed a reading group with male students from Jungang High School. It was called the Gyeongseong RS Reading Society and the "RS" stood for revolutionary socialism. Influenced by the Gwangju Student Movement in 1929, she participated in protests on campus and led a strike in 1931 where students submitted blank answer sheets in their exams. Some students later alleged that their blank sheets were due to ignorance, but the existence of Pak Chinhong, the star student's empty sheet proved that there was collusion. Hundreds of students were suspended and Pak Chinhong was expelled from her fourth year at Dongduk Girls' High School in June 1931. The bad feeling in the school gathered more support including teachers and governors. Eventually all the students were taken back, but Pak Chinhong remained expelled.

== Imprisonment ==
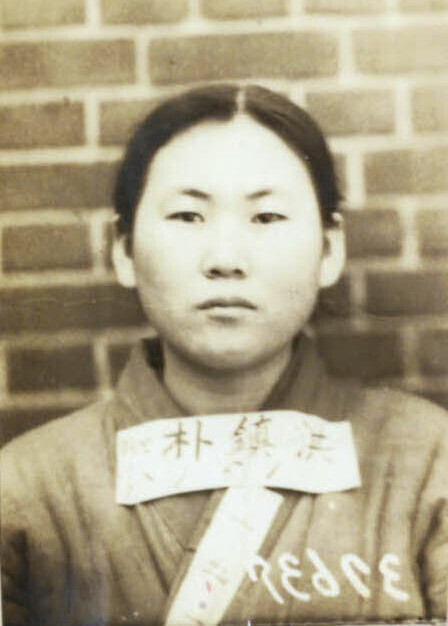
Pak's mug shot in 1938 in Seodaemun Prison

She first went to prison aged 18 in December 1931 for the student strike aka Gyeongseong Student RS Incident. She was frequently arrested for various incidents in 1934, 1935, 1937 and in 1941. In prison she would have been involved in forced labour. Thousands were arrested and the guards were surrounded by nationalist protestors. She was finally released from Japanese organised imprisonment in October 1934. She was 31 but she argued that she was only 23 if you ignored the time she had spent in prison. Her first partner Lee Jae-yu died in prison in 1944 and their only child died aged two after being born in prison and cared for by Pak Chinhong's mother.

Japan surrendered in 1945, and by that November she was in Seoul.

Her second husband was Kim Tae-jun, who was a leading professor at Keijo Imperial University. They decided to go to China which meant crossing several unfriendly borders. Her husband spoke fluent Japanese and they were able to trich and bribe their way there. Her husband was nearly the head of his university but instead he was a minister for the labour party and he was executed in 1949.

She and Kim Tae-jun had two children. After Kim Tae-jun died, Pak Chinhong chose to defect to North Korea.

== Death and legacy ==
There are records that she served as a member of the Supreme People's Assembly in the early days of the North Korean regime, but the time and place of her death are unknown.

On the 100th anniversary of the March First Movement, publications included the accounts of her life. The prison where she was kept is now Seodaemun Prison Museum. It has statues of Lee Hyo-jeong and Pak Chinhong reunited in cell number seven.
