= Song Kyewŏl =

Korean socialist and feminist (1911–1933)

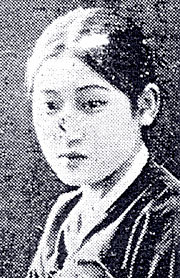
- Born: 10 December 1911; Pukchong County, Korea, Empire of Japan
- Died: May 30, 1933 (aged 21)

Song Kyewŏl (Korean: 송계월; Hanja: 宋桂月; 10 December 1911 – 30 May 1933) was a Korean socialist, writer and feminist activist during the period of Japanese rule in Korea.

== Biography ==
Song was born and raised in Pukchong County. Described as "cheerful and passionate", she was the eldest of six children born to Song Ch'iok and Yi Sunhŭi.

At the age of fifteen years old, she left to pursue her education in Seoul.

There she led three school strikes while attending Keijō Women's Commercial School.

After graduation, she worked as a journalist for the New Women's Journal, and wrote extensively on the discrimination against women.

Then, in 1930, she led the Seoul Female Students' Independence Movement and was imprisoned in Seodaemun Prison.

== Death ==
She died of intestinal tuberculosis in her hometown on 30 May 1933.
