= Seodaemun Prison =

Museum in Seoul, South Korea

Coordinates: 37.57442°N 126.95663°E

Seodaemun Prison History Hall
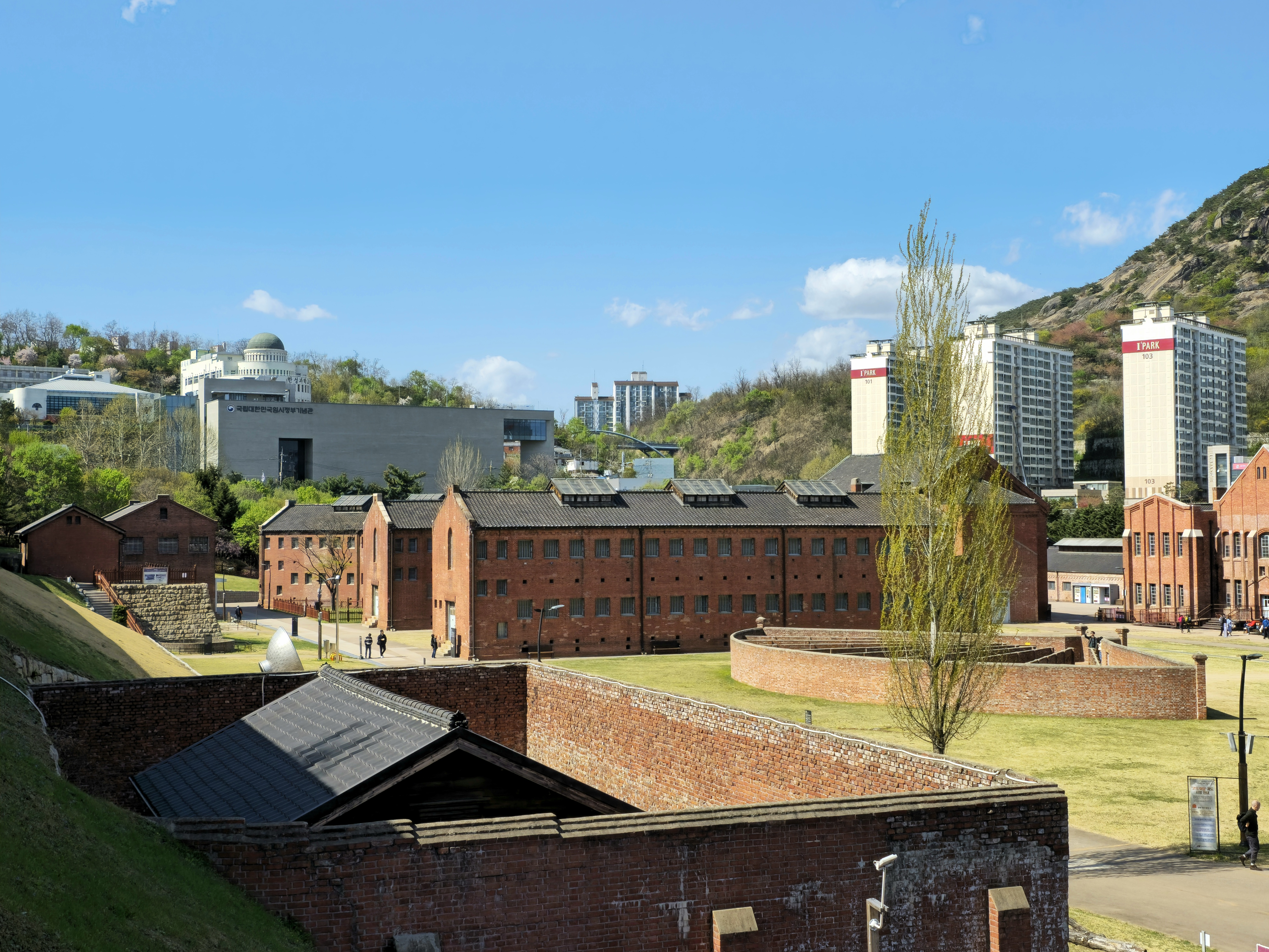
- View of Seodaemun Prison History Hall from the Seodaemun Independence Park
- Established: 1908 (as prison); 1998 (as museum)
- Type: Memorial museum

- Seodaemun Prison History Hall
- Hangul: 서대문형무소역사관
- Hanja: 西大門刑務所歷史觀
- RR: Seodaemun hyeongmuso yeoksagwan
- MR: Sŏdaemun hyŏngmuso yŏksagwan

Original name
- Hangul: 경성감옥
- Hanja: 京城監獄
- RR: Gyeongseong gamok
- MR: Kyŏngsŏng kamok

Other names
- Hangul: 서울형무소; 서울교도소; 서울구치소
- Hanja: 서울刑務所; 서울矯導所; 서울拘置所
- Lit.: Seoul Prison; Seoul Correctional Institute; Seoul Detention Center
- RR: Seoul hyeongmuso; Seoul gyodoso; Seoul guchiso
- MR: Sŏul hyŏngmuso; Sŏul kyodoso; Sŏul kuch'iso

Seodaemun Prison History Hall (Korean: 서대문형무소역사관) is a museum and former prison in Seodaemun District, Seoul, South Korea. Imperial Japan, then the overlord of Korea, began its construction in 1907.

The prison was opened on October 21, 1908, under the name Gyeongseong Gamok. During the early part of the Japanese colonial period it was known as Keijo Prison (Keijō Kangoku). Its name was changed to Seodaemun Prison in 1923, and it later had several other names. During Japanese rule, many people who opposed the oppression of Imperial Japan were tortured or executed there.

== History ==
The prison was used during the Japanese colonial period to imprison Korean independence activists. It could originally hold around 500 inmates. It had a separate facility for women and young girls. In 1911, notable activist Kim Ku was imprisoned here. In 1919, shortly after the March First Movement, the number of imprisoned increased drastically. About 3,000 activists were held here. Among the imprisoned after the March 1 Movement was Yu Gwan-sun, who died from the torture inflicted on her.

Park Jin-hong was a nationalist who spent over ten years of her life in Seodaemun Prison between 1932 and 1944 after being arrested five times. There are statues of the friends Lee Hyo-jeong and Park Jin-hong reunited in one of the women's prison cells.

Shortly before the end of the colonial period in 1945, the number of prisoners was 2,980.

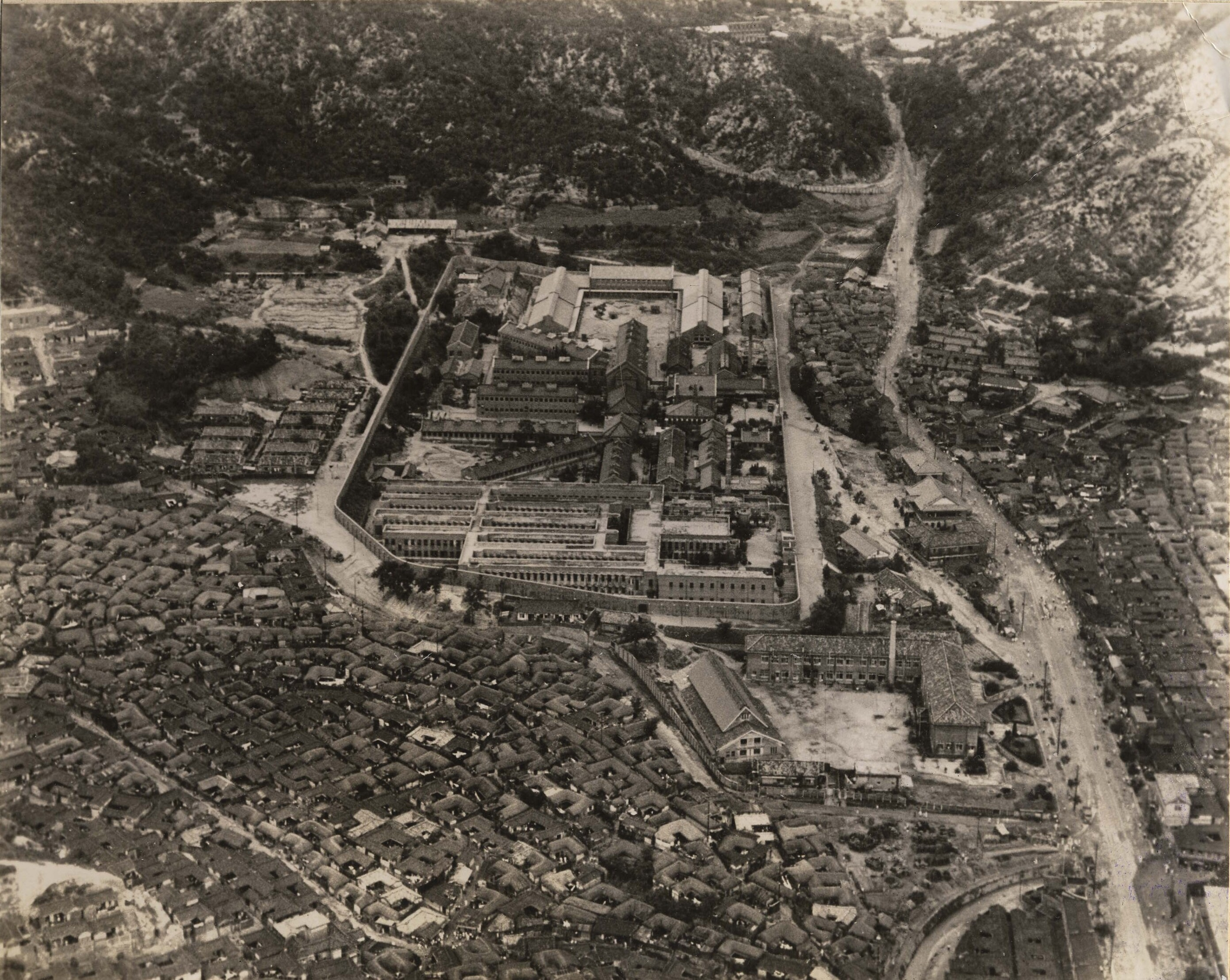
Aerial view of the prison in 1945

After liberation, the prison was used by the South Korean government, and between 1945 and 1950 the prison population tripled.

When North Korean forces captured Seoul in late June 1950 they released over 8,500 prisoners from the prison. Those inmates were soon replaced by 7-9,000 political prisoners, of which at least 1,000 were executed by North Korean forces as they abandoned Seoul in late September 1950.

The prison was known by various official names, including Seoul Prison until 1961, Seoul Correctional Institute until 1967 and Seoul Detention Center until its closure in 1987.

In 1983 the Chun Doo-hwan government decided to move the detention center out of central Seoul in preparation for the 1988 Summer Olympics. In 1986 it was announced that the prison would be demolished and replaced with a public park, however public pressure led to the decision in March 1987 to preserve the site as a memorial for colonial history.

In February 1986 families of 25 detained students presented a petition calling for the end of torture of their children at the prison. In February 1987 the Democracy Youth League released a statement detailing the torture of their leader Yun Yoyong. Also in 1987 families held a protest outside the prison calling for the end of the torture and release of the students.

The prison was decommissioned and inmates were transferred to the Seoul Detention Center in Uiwang, Gyeonggi Province by the end of 1987.

Most of the prison's post-1945 buildings and the southern section were demolished as part of the redevelopment, minimising future maintenance needs, while also erasing the recent history of the prison in favor of its colonial past. Protests over the retention or demolition of the prison's outer wall in 1990 delayed redevelopment for several months.

On 5 November 1998, the site was opened as the Seodaemun Prison History Hall, part of Seodaemun Independence Park which opened in 1992. Eleven of the prison complex's original 98 buildings, including the gallows area are preserved as historical monuments. The History Hall covers topics related to the prison during the Japanese colonial period and continues to serve as a memorial hall.

The History Hall has been criticised for focussing almost exclusively on the colonial period, while the prison's use in the postcolonial and democratization period is largely ignored.

During a visit to Seodaemun in August 2015, former Japanese prime minister Yukio Hatoyama knelt in front of a memorial stone as an expression of apology for Japanese war crimes in World War II.

== Notable prisoners ==
- Song Kye-wol
- Ahn Chang Ho
- Yu Gwan-sun, died as result of torture in 1920
- Kim Ku
- Park Jin-hong
- Lee Hyo-jeong
- Suh Sung
- Hwang Ji-u
- Ko Un
- Shin Joong-hyun
- Kim Dae-jung, later 8th President of South Korea
- Moon Jae-in, later 12th President of South Korea
- Heo Wi, righteous army commander, executed in 1908
- Cho Bong-am, political prisoner executed in July 1959
- Cho Yong-soo, anti-dictatorship newspaper publisher executed in December 1961
- Mun Se-gwang, assassin of first lady Yuk Young-soo executed in December 1974
- Eight accused conspirators of the People's Revolutionary Party Incident executed in April 1975
- Kim Dae-doo, serial killer executed in December 1976
- Kim Jae-gyu, assassin of President Park Chung-hee, and four others involved in the plot, executed in May 1980

== Location ==
Seodaemun Independence Park, including Seodaemun Prison, is located close to exits 4 and 5 of the Dongnimmun Station on Seoul Subway Line 3.

== See also ==
- Korea under Japanese rule
- Gyeonggyojang
- Museum of Japanese Colonial History in Korea
- Independence Gate
