= Lee Hyo-jeong (activist) =

South Korean independence activist (born 1913)

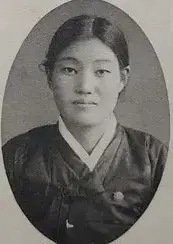
- from her graduation in 1932
- Born: July 28, 1913; Bonghwa County
- Died: 2010 (aged 96–97)
- Education: Dongduk Girls' High School
- Occupation: teacher
- Known for: last surviving woman from Korea's independence struggle
- Spouse: Park Du-Bok
- Children: three

Korean name
- Hangul: 이효정
- RR: I Hyojeong
- MR: I Hyojŏng

Lee Hyo-jeong (Korean: 이효정; born July 28, 1913) was a South Korean independence activist and later a poet. She went to prison for her activities. Her work was recognised in 2006 with an award. There is a statue of her and her friend, who died in North Korea, in Seodaemun Prison Museum.

== Life ==
Lee Hyo-jeong was born in 1913 in Bonghwa County. Her father died when she was one and for a time she was in Bongcheon, Manchuria. She came from an anti-Japanese family and she returned to be home-schooled by her grandfather.

She attended Dongduk Girls' High School established by the Cheondoist religion. Dongduk Girls' High School had been involved in the March 1st Movement. Its founder Son Byeong-hee had been arrested and replaced as headteacher in 1919 for being involved in the independence movement. She was a keen and attentive pupil. She was friends with Park Jin-hong who was ranked first in the school and they were anti-Japanese socialists. Lee Hyo-jeong was a keen activist who was also a good student. Her fifth cousin was the Korean nationalist and language expert Lee Byeong-gi and he gave her lessons.

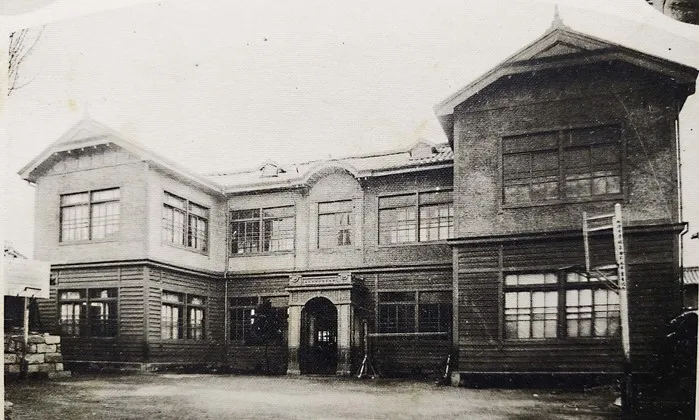
Dongduk Girls' High School in 1932

Their history teacher, Lee Gwan-sul, was a strong influence. She joined a reading group with male students. It was called the Gyeongseong RS Reading Society and the "RS" stood (secretly) for revolutionary socialism. Influenced by the Gwangju Student Movement in 1929, she participated in protests on campus and a strike in 1931 where students agreed to submit blank answer sheets in exams. Some students who did not comply alleged that the blank sheets were due to ignorance, but the existence of Park Jin-hong, the star student's empty sheet proved that they were wilfully misbehaving. Hundreds of students were suspended and Park Jin-hong was expelled in June 1931. The bad feeling in the school gathered more support including teachers and governors. Eventually all the students were taken back, but Park Jin-hong remained expelled.

Lee Hyo-jeong went on to teach at Ulsan Primary School and she continue to agitate. She had to leave that job because of her history of anti-Japanese views. She was involved in labour disputes and she went to prison for her activities on 1934. In 1935 she was back in her former school distributing anti-Japanese leaflets.

After Japan surrendered at the end of the second world war, Korea became independent but it did not welcome socialists. Her husband, Park Du-Bok, was a well known socialist and she was tortured. She decided to keep a low profile.

In 2006 the government decided that it would award medals to people who had helped to establish South Korea but they had been ignored if they were socialists. She was awarded the Order of Merit for National Foundation.

== Death and legacy ==
When she died in 2010 she was said to the last surviving woman from Korea's independence struggle.

On the 100th anniversary of the March 1st movement, publications included the accounts of her time when she was a student. The prison where she and her friend served sentences became Seodaemun Prison Museum. It has statues of Lee Hyo-jeong and Park Jin-hong reunited in one of the women's cells.

In her seventies she took to writing poetry.
