= Wilbur H. Cramblet =

Biographical details
- Born: 1892; Harrison County, Ohio, U.S.
- Died: 1975 (aged 82–83); Wheeling, West Virginia, U.S.
- Education: Yale (Ph.D.)

Coaching career (HC unless noted)
- 1915–1916: Phillips
- 1918: Bethany (WV)

Wilbur Haverfield Cramblet (July 10, 1892 – November 9, 1975) was an American college football coach, mathematics professor, and college president. He was the head football coach at Phillips University in Enid, Oklahoma from 1915 to 1916 and Bethany College in Bethany, West Virginia in 1918. He served as the dean of students at Bethany from 1918 to 1920 and later as the president of the college from 1934 to 1952.

Cramblet died on November 9, 1975, at a hospital in Wheeling, West Virginia.

== Head coaching record ==
Year	Team	Overall	Conference	Standing
Phillips Haymakers (Independent) (1915–1916)
1915	Phillips			
1916	Phillips			
Phillips:				
Bethany Bison (Independent) (1918)
1918	Bethany	1–1		
Bethany:		1–1		
Total:		2–7		
