= Kim Dae-doo =

South Korean serial killer (1949–1976)

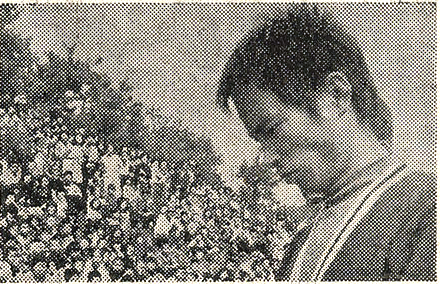
- Undated photograph of Kim taken sometime after his arrest.
- Born: 17 November 1949; Yeongam County, South Jeolla, South Korea
- Died: 28 December 1976 (aged 27); Seodaemun Prison, Seoul, South Korea
- Cause of death: Execution by hanging
- Status: Executed
- Convictions: Murder x17 Rape x3 Robbery; Attempted robbery
- Penalty: Death
- Accomplice: Kim Hoe-woon (limited)

Details
- Victims: 18
- Span of crimes: August – October 1975
- Country: South Korea
- Locations: South Jeolla, Seoul, Gyeonggi
- Killed: 17
- Injured: 1
- Date apprehended: October 5, 1975
- Imprisoned at: Seodaemun Prison

Kim Dae-doo (Korean: 김대두; Hanja: 金大斗, 17 November 1949 – December 28, 1976) was a South Korean serial killer and burglar who killed 17 people during a 55-day period from August to October 1975. Kim was considered as one of the worst and most prolific criminals in South Korea's history, and he was executed for his crimes in 1976.

== Early life ==
Kim Dae-doo was born on 17 November 1949, in rural Yeongam County, South Jeolla, the eldest of three sons and four daughters from a poor family. Kim's parents had high aspirations for him, wanting to send him to a top-class middle school in a big city and eventually study abroad. However, he failed his exams and had no special skills that would allow him to get a high-paying job. As a result, Kim developed an inferiority complex and turned towards petty crime, for which he was eventually imprisoned for assault and evidence tampering. After his release, Kim attempted to make an honest living as a factory worker, but he was ostracized for his ex-convict status, developing resentment towards society, which he felt had wronged him.

== Murders ==
On 13 August 1975, Kim broke into the home of an elderly couple living in Gwangju while trying to burglarize it. In the process, he killed the man and seriously injured the woman, before escaping into the night. While riding on a train towards Suncheon, Kim met a fellow ex-convict, 27-year-old Kim Hoe-woon, whom agreed to help him in his next attack.

Six days later, the pair entered a shop in Mongtan, Muan County, killing the elderly couple running it and their 7-year-old grandson. After the murders, they boarded a train headed to Seoul, where they had planned to rob a house filled with cash. When they reached it, however, the pair parted ways, and Dae-doo resumed robbing and killing by himself.

On 7 September, Kim entered a home in Seoul's Jungnang District, killing the 60-year-old man who lived there. On September 25, he travelled to the remote countryside near Pyeongtaek, breaking inside the house where an elderly woman and her three grandchildren were living. Kim is said to have attacked the woman and two of the male children (aged 5 and 7, respectively) with a meat cleaver, smashing it into their faces so hard that the faces were mutilated beyond recognition, and the cleaver's handle eventually breaking. He then dragged the 11-year-old granddaughter outside the house and attempted to rape her, but after failing to do so, he tied up her face with a furoshiki to a nearby tree, where the child suffocated to death.

On 27 September, Kim attacked another family in Guri, killing a young couple and their 3-year-old child, as well as wounding two others. Three days later, he broke into a home in Gunpo, raping and killing the mother before beating her 3-month-old baby to death.

On 2 October, Kim attacked a young couple in Suwon, killing them both. The following day, he attempted to kill a caddy at a golf course in Suwon, but the victim survived the attack. Kim fled back to Seoul, where he attempted to enlist another ex-convict he had met in Dobong District as his accomplice. The young man instead stole his belongings and tried to run away, but Kim caught up with him and killed him, stealing his would-be helper's jeans.

== Arrest and investigation ==
Despite the fact that the jeans he had stolen were still covered in blood, Kim went to a laundromat near Cheongnyangni Station to have them cleaned. When asked by the proprietor, 26-year-old Ha Geun-bae, about why they had so much blood on them, Kim claimed that he had been in a fight with a friend and the spots were from a nosebleed.

Ha did not believe his explanation, as the blood seemed way too much for a nosebleed, and he contacted the police about the suspicious client. Not long after, Kim was arrested and taken a police station. There, he first repeated his initial claim that the bloodstains were a result of a fight, but later on changed his testimony that he had been beaten up by local thugs. In an attempt to verify his account, the detectives interrogated several local gangsters, all of whom denied even meeting Kim. After this, detectives deduced that their detainee was likely a murderer, and began pressuring him for the real cause of the bloodstains. Eventually, Kim buckled and confessed to his crimes, implicating his accomplice Kim Hoe-woon, who was also arrested shortly afterwards.

Two days after his arrest, Kim was ordered to go on site inspections to showcase how exactly he had committed the murders. It has been rumored that he acted arrogantly during the procedures, chewing gum and laughing loudly, but this has not been verified with certainty. At the investigations, it was noted that he often targeted isolated, impoverished homes from which little money was stolen, which appeared to be deliberate, as the police focused on robberies committed against the middle and upper classes more frequently. In total, his total loot stolen from the crime scenes amounted to 26,800 won.

== Trial, imprisonment and execution ==
At their initial trial, both Dae-doo and Hae-woon were convicted on charges of murder, rape, robbery and attempted robbery and sentenced to death. At a follow-up trial, the latter's sentence was reduced to life imprisonment, as the judge recognized that he had only acted in one case and had been coerced by his partner. While awaiting execution, Dae-doo converted to Christianity and is said to have openly repented for his actions after attending church services.

On 28 December 1976, Kim Dae-doo was hanged at the Seodaemun Prison in Seoul, despite protests from his lawyer Lee Sang-hyeok, who had requested that his sentence be commuted and his case thoroughly examined to prevent similar incidents in the future. Just before his execution, Kim is said to have left behind a will, requesting that the justice system segregate small-time offenders and dangerous recidivists from one another, so that first-time offenders would not learn how to commit further crimes.

== In the media ==
In 2017, a movie based on the case, titled Ordinary Person, was released. After the film's release, the director Kim Bong-han gave an interview to The Hankyoreh, in which he suggested the possibility that the case had a lot of inconsistencies and that Kim could have been innocent.

In 2019, a podcast examining murder cases in South Korea covered Kim on their 40th episode.

== See also ==
- Capital punishment in South Korea
- List of serial killers by country
