= List of The New York Times number-one books of 2012 =

The American daily newspaper The New York Times publishes multiple weekly lists ranking the best selling books in the United States. The lists are split into three genres—fiction, nonfiction and children's books. Both the fiction and nonfiction lists are further split into multiple lists.

== Fiction ==
The following list ranks the number-one best selling fiction books, in the combined print and e-books category.

The most popular book of the year was Fifty Shades of Grey, by E. L. James with 28 weeks at the top.

Date	Book	Author
January 1	11/22/63	Stephen King
January 8	11/22/63	Stephen King
January 15	77 Shadow Street	Dean Koontz
January 22	Private: #1 Suspect	James Patterson and Maxine Paetro
January 29	Believing the Lie	Elizabeth George
February 5	Private: #1 Suspect	James Patterson and Maxine Paetro
February 12	Taken	Robert Crais
February 19	Home Front	Kristin Hannah
February 26	Kill Shot	Vince Flynn
March 4	Private Games	James Patterson
March 11	Celebrity in Death	J. D. Robb
March 18	Fifty Shades of Grey	E. L. James
March 25	Fifty Shades of Grey	E. L. James
April 1	Fifty Shades of Grey	E. L. James
April 8	Fifty Shades of Grey	E. L. James
April 15	Fifty Shades of Grey	E. L. James
April 22	Fifty Shades of Grey	E. L. James
April 29	Fifty Shades of Grey	E. L. James
May 6	Fifty Shades of Grey	E. L. James
May 13	Fifty Shades of Grey	E. L. James
May 20	Fifty Shades of Grey	E. L. James
May 27	Fifty Shades of Grey	E. L. James
June 3	Fifty Shades of Grey	E. L. James
June 10	Fifty Shades of Grey	E. L. James
June 17	Fifty Shades of Grey	E. L. James
June 24	Fifty Shades of Grey	E. L. James
July 1	Fifty Shades of Grey	E. L. James
July 8	Fifty Shades of Grey	E. L. James
July 15	Fifty Shades of Grey	E. L. James
July 22	Fifty Shades of Grey	E. L. James
July 29	Fifty Shades of Grey	E. L. James
August 5	Fifty Shades of Grey	E. L. James
August 12	Fifty Shades of Grey	E. L. James
August 19	Fifty Shades of Grey	E. L. James
August 26	Fifty Shades of Grey	E. L. James
September 2	Fifty Shades of Grey	E. L. James
September 9	Fifty Shades of Grey	E. L. James
September 16	Fifty Shades of Grey	E. L. James
September 23	Fifty Shades of Grey	E. L. James
September 30	A Wanted Man	Lee Child
October 7	Winter of the World	Ken Follett
October 14	The Casual Vacancy	J. K. Rowling
October 21	Reflected in You	Sylvia Day
October 28	Reflected in You	Sylvia Day
November 4	The Bone Bed	Patricia Cornwell
November 11	The Racketeer	John Grisham
November 18	The Racketeer	John Grisham
November 25	The Perfect Hope	Nora Roberts
December 2	The Last Man	Vince Flynn
December 9	Notorious Nineteen	Janet Evanovich
December 16	The Black Box	Michael Connelly
December 23	Threat Vector	Tom Clancy
December 30	Gone Girl	Gillian Flynn

== Nonfiction ==
The following list ranks the number-one best selling nonfiction books, in the combined print and e-books category. The most frequent weekly best seller of the year was Killing Kennedy by Bill O'Reilly and Martin Dugard with 9 weeks at the top of the list.

Date	Book	Author	Publisher
January 1	Steve Jobs	Walter Isaacson	Simon & Schuster
January 8	Steve Jobs	Walter Isaacson	Simon & Schuster
January 15	Heaven Is for Real	Todd Burpo with Lynn Vincent	Thomas Nelson
January 22	Heaven Is for Real	Todd Burpo with Lynn Vincent	Thomas Nelson
January 29	Heaven Is for Real	Todd Burpo with Lynn Vincent	Thomas Nelson
February 5	Ameritopia	Mark R. Levin	Threshold Editions
February 12	Heaven Is for Real	Todd Burpo with Lynn Vincent	Thomas Nelson
February 19	Heaven Is for Real	Todd Burpo with Lynn Vincent	Thomas Nelson
February 26	Once Upon a Secret	Mimi Alford	Random House Publishing
March 4	The Vow	Kim and Krickitt Carpenter with Dana Wilkerson	B&H Publishing Group
March 11	The Vow	Kim and Krickitt Carpenter with Dana Wilkerson	B&H Publishing Group
March 18	The Vow	Kim and Krickitt Carpenter with Dana Wilkerson	B&H Publishing Group
March 25	The Vow	Kim and Krickitt Carpenter with Dana Wilkerson	B&H Publishing Group
April 1	Heaven Is for Real	Todd Burpo with Lynn Vincent	Thomas Nelson
April 8	Imagine	Jonah Lehrer	Houghton Mifflin Harcourt
April 15	The Big Miss	Hank Haney	Crown Publishing
April 22	Drift	Rachel Maddow	Crown Publishing
April 29	A Night to Remember	Walter Lord	Open Road Integrated Media
May 6	Let's Pretend This Never Happened	Jenny Lawson	Penguin Group
May 13	Lots of Candles, Plenty of Cake	Anna Quindlen	Random House Publishing
May 20	The Passage of Power	Robert A. Caro	Knopf Doubleday Publishing
May 27	The Passage of Power	Robert A. Caro	Knopf Doubleday Publishing
June 3	Amateur	Edward Klein	Regnery Publishing
June 10	Amateur	Edward Klein	Regnery Publishing
June 17	Amateur	Edward Klein	Regnery Publishing
June 24	Amateur	Edward Klein	Regnery Publishing
July 1	Amateur	Edward Klein	Regnery Publishing
July 8	Amateur	Edward Klein	Regnery Publishing
July 10	In Hines’ Sight: The Ups, Downs, and Rebounds of 40 Years in Sports Broadcasting	Hope Hines	Franklin Green Publishing
July 22	Wild	Cheryl Strayed	Knopf
July 29	Wild	Cheryl Strayed	Knopf
August 5	Wild	Cheryl Strayed	Knopf
August 12	Wild	Cheryl Strayed	Knopf
August 19	Wild	Cheryl Strayed	Knopf
August 26	Wild	Cheryl Strayed	Knopf
September 2	Unbroken	Laura Hillenbrand	Random House Publishing
September 9	Paterno	Joe Posnanski	Simon & Schuster
September 16	The Glass Castle	Jeannette Walls	Simon & Schuster
September 23	No Easy Day	Mark Owen with Kevin Maurer	Penguin Group
September 30	No Easy Day	Mark Owen with Kevin Maurer	Penguin Group
October 7	No Easy Day	Mark Owen with Kevin Maurer	Penguin Group
October 14	No Easy Day	Mark Owen with Kevin Maurer	Penguin Group
October 21	Killing Kennedy	Bill O'Reilly and Martin Dugard	Henry Holt & Company
October 28	Killing Kennedy	Bill O'Reilly and Martin Dugard	Henry Holt & Company
November 4	Killing Kennedy	Bill O'Reilly and Martin Dugard	Henry Holt & Company
November 11	Proof of Heaven	Eben Alexander	Simon & Schuster
November 18	Killing Kennedy	Bill O'Reilly and Martin Dugard	Henry Holt & Company
November 25	Killing Kennedy	Bill O'Reilly and Martin Dugard	Henry Holt & Company
December 2	Killing Kennedy	Bill O'Reilly and Martin Dugard	Henry Holt & Company
December 9	Killing Kennedy	Bill O'Reilly and Martin Dugard	Henry Holt & Company
December 16	Killing Kennedy	Bill O'Reilly and Martin Dugard	Henry Holt & Company
December 23	Proof of Heaven	Eben Alexander	Simon & Schuster
December 30	Killing Kennedy	Bill O'Reilly and Martin Dugard	Henry Holt & Company

== See also ==
- Publishers Weekly list of bestselling novels in the United States in the 2010s
