= Pam Reynolds case =

Reported near-death experience

Pam Reynolds Lowery (May 31, 1956 – May 22, 2010), from Atlanta, Georgia, was an American woman who, in 1991, stated that she had a near-death experience (NDE) during a brain operation performed by Robert F. Spetzler at the Barrow Neurological Institute in Phoenix, Arizona. Reynolds was under close medical monitoring during the entire operation. During part of the operation she had no brain-wave activity and no blood flowing in her brain, which rendered her clinically dead. She claimed to have made several observations during the procedure which medical personnel reported to be accurate.

Within the field of near-death studies and among those who believe in life after death, the case has been cited as well-documented and significant, with many proponents considering it to be evidence of the survival of consciousness after death. An anesthesiologist who examined the case offered anesthesia awareness as a more prosaic and conventional explanation for such claims. Reynolds died from heart failure at the age of 53 on May 22, 2010, at Emory University Hospital in Atlanta, Georgia.

== Diagnosis and operation ==
Reynolds reported to her physician that she was experiencing symptoms of dizziness, loss of speech and difficulty in moving parts of her body. Her physician referred her to a neurologist, and a CAT scan later revealed that Reynolds had a large aneurysm in her brain, close to the brain stem. Because of the difficult position of the aneurysm, Reynolds was predicted to have no chance of surviving surgery for its removal. As a last resort, Robert F. Spetzler, a neurosurgeon of the Barrow Neurological Institute in Phoenix, Arizona, decided that a rarely performed procedure, known as a deep hypothermic circulatory arrest or 'standstill operation', could improve Reynolds' chances of surviving surgical removal of the aneurysm. During this procedure, Reynolds' body temperature was lowered to 50 °F (10 °C), her breathing and heartbeat stopped, and the blood drained from her head. Her eyes were closed with tape and small ear plugs with speakers were placed in her ears. These speakers emitted audible clicks which were used to check the function of the brain stem to ensure that she had a flat electroencephalography (EEG)—indicating a non-responsive brain—before the operation proceeded. The operation was a success and Reynolds recovered completely. The total surgery lasted about seven hours with a few complications along the way.

== Claimed NDE ==
Reynolds reported that during the operation she heard a sound like a 'D' natural that seemed to pull her out of her body and allowed her to "float" above the operating room and watch the doctors perform the operation. Reynolds claims that during this time she felt "more aware than normal" and her vision was more focused and clearer than normal vision. She reported seeing the surgical "saw" but said it looked like an electric toothbrush, and this is in fact true. She said she could hear conversations between operating room staff, even though she had earphones in her ears which were making a loud clicking noise many times per second in order to monitor her brain function.

At some point during the operation, she says she noticed a presence and was pulled towards a light. She says she began to discern figures in the light, including her grandmother, an uncle, other deceased relatives and people unknown to her. According to Reynolds, the longer she was there, the more she enjoyed it, but at some point she was reminded that she had to go back. She says her uncle brought her back to her body, but she did not want to go, so he pushed her in, and the sensation was like that of jumping into ice water.

== Reception ==
Reynolds' NDE has been put forward as evidence supporting an afterlife by proponents such as cardiologist Michael Sabom in his book Light and Death. According to Sabom, Reynolds' experience occurred during a period in which her brain had completely ceased to function.

Critics say that the amount of time during which Reynolds was "flatlined" is generally misrepresented and suggest that her NDE occurred under general anaesthesia when the brain was still active, hours before Reynolds underwent hypothermic cardiac arrest.

Anesthesiologist Gerald Woerlee analyzed the case, and concluded that Reynolds' ability to perceive events during her surgery was a result of "anesthesia awareness".

According to the psychologist Chris French, who served as editor in chief of The Skeptic magazine:

Woerlee, an anesthesiologist with many years of clinical experience, has considered this case in detail and remains unconvinced of the need for a paranormal explanation... [He] draws attention to the fact that Reynolds could only give a report of her experience some time after she recovered from the anesthetic as she was still intubated when she regained consciousness. This would provide some opportunity for her to associate and elaborate upon the sensations she had experienced during the operation with her existing knowledge and expectations. The fact that she described the small pneumatic saw used in the operation also does not impress Woerlee. As he points out, the saw sounds like and, to some extent, looks like the pneumatic drills used by dentists.

In his large study on near-death experiences, Professor Sam Parnia's group, The Human Consciousness Project, in their AWARE-study identified one subject out of 101 cardiac arrest survivors, who "described details related to technical resuscitation equipment". None of the patients reported seeing the test design with upward facing images.

== In popular culture ==
BBC (Bristol) made a one-hour documentary about the Pam Reynolds case titled The Day I Died: The Mind, the Brain, and Near-Death Experience. It aired in 2003. In it, Reynolds' neurosurgeon stated that it was "inconceivable” that Reynolds could have seen and heard what she did through ordinary means, such as vision and hearing, since her eyes were covered and her ears were plugged.

== See also ==
- Life After Life
- 23 Minutes in Hell
- 90 Minutes in Heaven
- Eben Alexander
- Heaven is for Real
- Howard Storm, author of the book My Descent Into Death
- The Boy Who Came Back From Heaven
