= The Boy Who Came Back from Heaven =

Book by Kevin and Alex Malarkey

The Boy Who Came Back From Heaven
- Author: Kevin and Alex Malarkey
- Language: English
- Publisher: Tyndale House Publishers
- Publication date: July 2, 2010
- Publication place: United States
- Media type: Print (hardcover)
- Pages: 240

The Boy Who Came Back from Heaven: A True Story is a best-selling 2010 Christian book that purported to tell the story of Alex Malarkey's experiences in heaven after a traffic accident in 2004. It was published by Tyndale House Publishers, in 2010. Alex's father, Kevin Malarkey, is credited as a co-author along with Alex, and is the sole holder of the copyright. The book, which has sold more than a million copies, was adapted into a television film in March 2010.

Since publication, Alex Malarkey and his mother, Beth have disavowed the book. Alex commented online in 2011 that it was "one of the most deceptive books ever", and wrote an extensive repudiation in an open letter to Christian bookstores in 2015, describing his near-death experience as a fabrication and that he never went to heaven. Its publisher Tyndale House therefore stopped printing the book, and many Christian bookstores removed it from their shelves.

== Accident and recovery ==
On November 14, 2004, six-year-old Alex Malarkey and his father, Kevin, were involved in a car accident on a highway near Rushsylvania, Ohio. Alex suffered various injuries in the accident, including a severe spinal injury, severe neck injuries, and brain trauma; was left a quadriplegic; and was in a coma for two months. During his recovery, Alex told his parents stories of visions of heaven that he had supposedly seen; the parents recounted some of these on a recovery blog, which did not attract significant media attention.

In 2009, Malarkey, aged 10, became the youngest person to have the surgical procedure first carried out for Christopher Reeve to allow him to breathe on his own without a ventilator. Later in 2009, he was able to stand upright in a supporting frame and, with helpers moving his legs, to walk on a treadmill.

== Summary ==
The book purports to describe supernatural visions and experiences that Alex had immediately after the accident and during his recovery. These include an out-of-body experience, where he saw his father being caught and carried to safety by an angel after flying out of the window of the car. The book says that, soon after that, he felt an angel take him through the gates of Heaven, which he describes as being "tall", to meet Jesus, who appears through a "hole in heaven". The devil also appears. The book recounts several trips to heaven and back.

Tyndale House promoted the book as "a supernatural encounter that will give you new insights on Heaven, angels, and hearing the voice of God".

== Publication and reception ==
Beth Malarkey later stated that her husband, Kevin, got the idea for writing the book after the media attention paid in 2009 to Alex's surgery, and that she resisted his bringing Matt Jacobson, a literary agent, to meet their son. A book deal was signed by the end of the year, which gave Kevin exclusive copyright. Kevin was the book's main promoter, giving many talks and interviews.

Books purporting to describe real visits to Heaven make up a popular and highly lucrative genre of religious books in the United States. The 2004 book 90 Minutes in Heaven spent over five years on the New York Times best-seller list and sold over six million copies; the book Heaven Is for Real has sold over 10 million copies and the film adaptation earned $101 million at the box office. The Boy Who Came Back from Heaven sold 112,386 copies in the first year, and received a platinum award from the Evangelical Christian Publishers Association in 2013 for over a million sales.

According to Benjamin Radford, a paranormal researcher, part of the reason for which the story was so well received and accepted by its American Christian audience is that it reinforced their existing narratives and beliefs. By sticking closely to a widely accepted interpretation of heaven, God and demons, Malarkey was assured that his story would meet his audience's expectations and be popular.

== Repudiation, lawsuits, and eviction ==
In November 2011, Alex Malarkey posted on a fanpage about the book a comment, in which he called it "1 of the most deceptive books ever." [sic] This comment was deleted by the moderators of the page shortly afterwards, and Alex was banned from the page.

In November 2012, Alex's mother, Beth Malarkey, wrote several blog posts saying that her family was not in agreement with the content of the book. She expressed frustration with several people calling and visiting their home over the years, saying "[Alex] is just a boy not a statue [sic] to be worshipped or person with some supernatural gifts" and "He does not go to Heaven, have conversations with supernatural beings, and whatever visions/experiences he has had or had not had, is up to him as to what he will do with those." Later that month, she said that the book's account had been embellished, adding "The truth is getting twisted, distorted, and packaged to be sold to the highest bidder." Beth and Kevin Malarkey have become estranged after the book was published and ultimately divorced in 2018.

On May 9, 2014, Beth Malarkey appeared on a Christian radio show, The Bible Answer Man, where she said that the book was deceptive and embellished the story of the accident. Beth Malarkey said Alex is still a quadriplegic, and cannot legally receive any money from the book. She also began communicating with Phil Johnson, the executive director of John F. MacArthur's media ministry, Grace to You, in hopes of communicating her story. Johnson said that Beth had told him that she and Alex had been trying to publicize for some time that the book was "an exaggeration and an embellishment." Johnson subsequently wrote in his blog, The Spurgeon Archive, that Beth Malarkey had sent Tyndale "a stack of correspondence", in which she stated that Alex received no royalties from the book and "[Kevin] neglects his duties as a husband and a father" and "[Kevin was] not even adequately supporting his family financially." She had also revealed this to an apologist, Justin Peters, who then e-mailed Ed Stetzer and Thom S. Rainer, the heads of the publisher, LifeWay. They responded, but the book would not be withdrawn from LifeWay stores for another eight months.

On January 13, 2015, Alex Malarkey released an open letter to Christian publishers and bookstores, via a Christian Apologetics blog, Pulpit and Pen, confessing that the entire account of his journey to Heaven was fictional, and implored them to remove the book from their stores. In his letter he said:

"Please forgive the brevity, but because of my limitations I have to keep this short. I did not die. I did not go to Heaven. I said I went to Heaven because I thought it would get me attention. When I made the claims that I did, I had never read the Bible. People have profited from lies, and continue to. They should read the Bible, which is enough. The Bible is the only source of truth. Anything written by man cannot be infallible. It is only through repentance of your sins and a belief in Jesus as the Son of God, who died for your sins (even though he committed none of his own) so that you can be forgiven may you learn of Heaven outside of what is written in the Bible... not by reading a work of man. I want the whole world to know that the Bible is sufficient. Those who market these materials must be called to repent and hold the Bible as enough. In Christ, Alex Malarkey."

On January 15, 2015, Tyndale House confirmed it would be withdrawing the book.

Kevin Malarkey did not speak publicly after his son retracted the book's claims and rebuffed efforts by journalists to contact him until a Slate interview in 2019. He told Ruth Graham that he stood by the book. He had not spoken previously because, after prayer, he believed God did not want him to since it would harm his children. He claimed that royalties from the book had come to approximately a million dollars, half of it from the advance, but most of it had been spent on Alex's care, or given to his church and other Christian charities, and none of it was left.

In 2018, Alex Malarkey filed a lawsuit against Tyndale House, the main publisher based in suburban Chicago, accusing them of charges including defamation and exploitation, seeking an award at least equivalent to the book's profits. That same year, Kevin and Beth divorced. Beth received custody of Alex (now an adult) and the couple's other children went to live with their father in Fort Collins, Colorado. Since then, Beth has stated that she and Alex were in a difficult financial situation. Even after the divorce, Kevin held the title to the family's home in Logan County, Ohio. He eventually evicted Beth and Alex from the house in 2022 in order to sell. Kevin claimed that he needed the proceeds from the house sale to provide for his and Beth's other children. Beth and Alex, on the other hand, claimed that Kevin was motivated by revenge for Alex's renunciation of the book.

== See also ==
- 23 Minutes in Hell, 2006 book by Bill Wiese recounting what the author believes were his experiences in Hell in 1998
- Heaven Is for Real, 2010 book by Todd Burpo and Lynn Vincent
- Eben Alexander, author of the 2012 book Proof of Heaven: A Neurosurgeon's Journey into the Afterlife
- Howard Storm, author of the book My Descent Into Death about his near-death experience
- List of religious hoaxes
- Pam Reynolds case
- Media magnate Kerry Packer, on his experience of being clinically dead for six minutes after a heart attack.
- "Bart's Not Dead", a 2018 episode of The Simpsons in which Bart claims to have seen heaven after a near-death experience
