= List of The New York Times number-one books of 2013 =

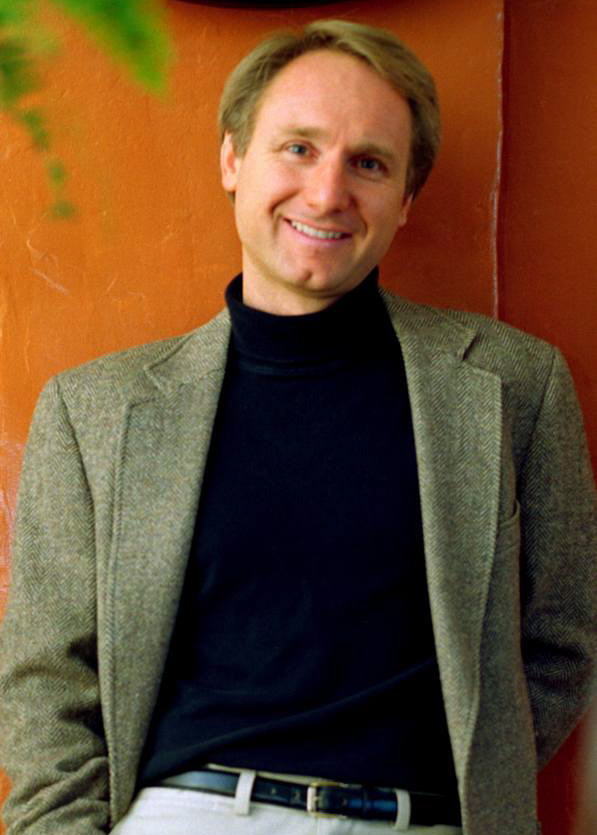
Dan Brown's Inferno was the most frequent weekly best-selling combined fiction book in 2013.

The American daily newspaper The New York Times publishes multiple weekly lists ranking the best selling books in the United States. The lists are split into three genres—fiction, nonfiction and children's books. Both the fiction and nonfiction lists are further split into multiple lists.

== Fiction ==
The following list ranks the number-one best selling fiction books, in the combined print and e-books category.

The most frequent weekly best seller of the year was Inferno by Dan Brown with 6 weeks at the top of the list, followed closely by The Cuckoo's Calling by Robert Galbraith with 5 weeks at the top of the list and Sycamore Row by John Grisham with 4 weeks at the top of the list.

Date	Book	Author
January 6	The Racketeer	John Grisham
January 13	Gone Girl	Gillian Flynn
January 20	Gone Girl	Gillian Flynn
January 27	A Memory of Light	Robert Jordan and Brandon Sanderson
February 3	A Memory of Light	Robert Jordan and Brandon Sanderson
February 10	Private Berlin	James Patterson and Mark Sullivan
February 17	Until the End of Time	Danielle Steel
February 24	Until the End of Time	Danielle Steel
March 3	A Week in Winter	Maeve Binchy
March 10	Alex Cross, Run	James Patterson
March 17	Calculated in Death	J. D. Robb
March 24	Reckless	S.C. Stephens
March 31	Alex Cross, Run	James Patterson
April 7	Six Years	Harlan Coben
April 14	Lover at Last	J. R. Ward
April 21	Walking Disaster	Jamie McGuire
April 28	The Bet	Rachel Van Dyken
May 5	Whiskey Beach	Nora Roberts
May 12	The Hit	David Baldacci
May 19	12th of Never	James Patterson and Maxine Paetro
May 26	Dead Ever After	Charlaine Harris
June 2	Inferno	Dan Brown
June 9	Inferno	Dan Brown
June 16	Inferno	Dan Brown
June 23	Entwined with You	Sylvia Day
June 30	Inferno	Dan Brown
July 7	Inferno	Dan Brown
July 14	Second Honeymoon	James Patterson and Howard Roughan
July 21	Inferno	Dan Brown
July 28	Hidden Order	Brad Thor
August 4	The Cuckoo's Calling	Robert Galbraith
August 11	The Cuckoo's Calling	Robert Galbraith
August 18	The Cuckoo's Calling	Robert Galbraith
August 25	Burn	Maya Banks
September 1	The Cuckoo's Calling	Robert Galbraith
September 8	The Cuckoo's Calling	Robert Galbraith
September 15	How the Light Gets In	Louise Penny
September 22	Never Go Back	Lee Child
September 29	W is for Wasted	Sue Grafton
October 6	The Longest Ride	Nicholas Sparks
October 13	Doctor Sleep	Stephen King
October 20	Gone	James Patterson and Michael Ledwidge
October 27	Storm Front	John Sandford
November 3	Just One Evil Act	Elizabeth George
November 10	Sycamore Row	John Grisham
November 17	Dark Witch	Nora Roberts
November 24	Sycamore Row	John Grisham
December 1	Sycamore Row	John Grisham
December 8	Takedown Twenty	Janet Evanovich
December 15	Cross My Heart	James Patterson
December 22	The Gods of Guilt	Michael Connelly
December 29	Sycamore Row	John Grisham

== Nonfiction ==
The following list ranks the number-one best selling nonfiction books, in the combined print and e-books category. The most frequent weekly best seller of the year was Proof of Heaven by Eben Alexander with 11 weeks at the top of the list.

Date	Book	Author	Publisher
January 6	Proof of Heaven	Eben Alexander	Simon & Schuster
January 13	Proof of Heaven	Eben Alexander	Simon & Schuster
January 20	Proof of Heaven	Eben Alexander	Simon & Schuster
January 27	Proof of Heaven	Eben Alexander	Simon & Schuster
February 3	Proof of Heaven	Eben Alexander	Simon & Schuster
February 10	Proof of Heaven	Eben Alexander	Simon & Schuster
February 17	Proof of Heaven	Eben Alexander	Simon & Schuster
February 24	American Sniper	Chris Kyle with Scott McEwen and Jim DeFelice	Morrow/HarperCollins
March 3	American Sniper	Chris Kyle with Scott McEwen and Jim DeFelice	Morrow/HarperCollins
March 10	American Sniper	Chris Kyle with Scott McEwen and Jim DeFelice	Morrow/HarperCollins
March 17	America the Beautiful	Ben C. Carson and Candy Carson	Zondervan
March 24	Proof of Heaven	Eben Alexander	Simon & Schuster
March 31	Lean In	Sheryl Sandberg with Nell Scovell	Knopf Doubleday Publishing
April 7	Lean In	Sheryl Sandberg with Nell Scovell	Knopf Doubleday Publishing
April 14	Lean In	Sheryl Sandberg with Nell Scovell	Knopf Doubleday Publishing
April 21	Lean In	Sheryl Sandberg with Nell Scovell	Knopf Doubleday Publishing
April 28	Lean In	Sheryl Sandberg with Nell Scovell	Knopf Doubleday Publishing
May 5	Lean In	Sheryl Sandberg with Nell Scovell	Knopf Doubleday Publishing
May 12	Let's Explore Diabetes With Owls	David Sedaris	Little, Brown
May 19	Control	Glenn Beck and others	Threshold Editions/Mercury Radio Arts
May 26	Happy, Happy, Happy	Phil Robertson with Mark Schlabach	Howard Books
June 2	The Guns at Last Light	Rick Atkinson	Holt
June 9	Eleven Rings	Phil Jackson and Hugh Delehanty	Penguin Press
June 16	Lean In	Sheryl Sandberg with Nell Scovell	Knopf Doubleday Publishing
June 23	The Dog Lived (and So Will I)	Teresa J. Rhyne	Sourcebooks
June 30	Happy, Happy, Happy	Phil Robertson with Mark Schlabach	Howard Books
July 7	Happy, Happy, Happy	Phil Robertson with Mark Schlabach	Howard Books
July 14	Proof of Heaven	Eben Alexander	Simon & Schuster
July 21	Proof of Heaven	Eben Alexander	Simon & Schuster
July 28	Proof of Heaven	Eben Alexander	Simon & Schuster
August 4	This Town	Mark Leibovich	Blue Rider
August 11	Zealot	Reza Aslan	Random House
August 18	Zealot	Reza Aslan	Random House
August 25	Zealot	Reza Aslan	Random House
September 1	The Liberty Amendments	Mark R. Levin	Threshold Editions
September 8	The Liberty Amendments	Mark R. Levin	Threshold Editions
September 15	The Liberty Amendments	Mark R. Levin	Threshold Editions
September 22	Si-cology 1	Si Robertson with Mark Schlabach	Howard Books
September 29	Si-cology 1	Si Robertson with Mark Schlabach	Howard Books
October 6	Si-cology 1	Si Robertson with Mark Schlabach	Howard Books
October 13	Killing Jesus	Bill O'Reilly and Martin Dugard	Holt
October 20	Killing Jesus	Bill O'Reilly and Martin Dugard	Holt
October 27	Killing Jesus	Bill O'Reilly and Martin Dugard	Holt
November 3	Killing Jesus	Bill O'Reilly and Martin Dugard	Holt
November 10	Killing Jesus	Bill O'Reilly and Martin Dugard	Holt
November 17	Killing Jesus	Bill O'Reilly and Martin Dugard	Holt
November 24	Things That Matter	Charles Krauthammer	Crown Forum
December 1	Things That Matter	Charles Krauthammer	Crown Forum
December 8	Things That Matter	Charles Krauthammer	Crown Forum
December 15	Things That Matter	Charles Krauthammer	Crown Forum
December 22	Things That Matter	Charles Krauthammer	Crown Forum
December 29	Things That Matter	Charles Krauthammer	Crown Forum

== See also ==
- Publishers Weekly list of bestselling novels in the United States in the 2010s
