= Eben Alexander =

Eben Alexander may refer to:

- Eben Alexander (educator) (1851–1910), American educator
- Eben Alexander (author) (born 1953), American author and neurosurgeon
- Eben Alexander Jr (1913–2004), American neurosurgeon
