= Dryhthelm =

Northumbrian saint

- Born: Cunninghame?, kingdom of Northumbria
- Died: 8th century unknown
- Venerated in: Medieval England
- Major shrine: Melrose Abbey (destroyed)
- Feast: 1 September

Dryhthelm (fl. c. 700), also known as Drithelm or Drythelm, was a monk associated with the monastery of Melrose known from the Historia Ecclesiastica gentis Anglorum of Bede. According to the latter, before entering the religious life he lived with his family in "a district of Northumbria which is called Incuneningum". Incuneningum is thought by some modern scholars to refer to Cunninghame, now part of Ayrshire.

After an illness that gradually grew worse as the days went by, Drythelm temporarily died (c. 700), then came back to life a few hours later, scaring everyone but his wife. Dryhthelm portioned his wealth out between his wife, sons and the poor, and became a monk at Melrose, where he devoted himself to God. Drythelm’s vision convinced him it was vital to live a devout life on Earth, if he was to be granted immediate entrance into Heaven. As a monk he established a reputation for being able to endure bodily torment, reciting psalms standing up in the River Tweed even when the river was icy.

While temporarily dead, Dryhthelm was apparently given a tour of the afterlife by a celestial guide. In the "vision of Dryhthelm", the future monk of Melrose was shown hell, purgatory, and heaven, along with some of the souls therein, but was denied entry to paradise. Purgatory was a place of extreme heat and cold, Hell a place where souls burned, Heaven a place of intense light, and Paradise a place of even greater light. Drythelm's experience in a valley suggests the temporariness of purgatory, for it was an intermediate stage, straddling Heaven and Hell. As a result, one modern historian has called him "a remote precursor of Dante".

The mention of purgatory within the text is vital in understanding the eighth-century Christian viewpoint on the afterlife. Although it is unknown at which point in history purgatory came into existence in the Christian religion, “the idea of purgatory as a staging post in the afterlife, with recognizable features, descriptive energy, theological justification, and political use, burst on to the eschatological landscape in the eighth century.” Arguably, purgatory functioned within the Church as a reminder to people that simply identifying as a Christian would not guarantee automatic entrance into Heaven; rather one must dedicate one's life to God’s work. To this extent Bede utilized Drythelm as a role model, displaying how a previously elite layman could transform himself and lead a devout life within the confines of the Church.

Bede says that Dryhthelm related the tale to Aldfrith king of Northumbria, Æthelwold bishop of Lindisfarne and an Irish monk called Haemgisl. A similar vision of the afterlife was later reported by Boniface, who described a vision of hell experienced by a monk of Much Wenlock. Prior to Bede and Boniface, the Vita sancti Fursei, had attributed a like vision to its own hero, Fursa, and Bede himself quoted this in part.

Dryhthelm was celebrated a century later in Alcuin's De pontificibus et sanctis Ecclesiae Eboracensis. More than a century after Alcuin, Ælfric of Eynsham celebrated the vision and believed it had been given to instruct others. Dryhthelm is listed as resting at Melrose in the resting-place list of Hugh Candidus. His feast day is 1 September.

== See also ==
- Anita Moorjani
- Pam Reynolds case
- Eben Alexander (author)
