= Anita Moorjani =

British writer

- Born: Anita Shamdasani; Singapore
- Occupations: Author, speaker, consultant
- Spouse: Danny Moorjani (m. 1995)
- Parents: Hargobind (father); Neelu (mother)
- Relatives: Anoop Shamdasani (brother)
- Website: anitamoorjani.com

Anita Moorjani is the author of five books, including the New York Times bestseller, Dying to be Me.

After she was diagnosed with stage 2A Hodgkin's lymphoma in 2002, and rejected conventional treatment, Moorjani was taken to a hospital in 2006 where she lay in a coma for 30 hours, during which Moorjani claims to have undergone a near-death experience.

== Biography ==
=== Early life and education ===
Moorjani was born to Sindhi Indian parents Hargobind (father) and Neelu (mother) Shamdasani in Singapore. Shortly after her birth, her family moved to Sri Lanka, and when she was two years old, the family moved to Hong Kong, where she and her older brother Anoop grew up. Moorjani and her brother both studied in British schools. As an ethnic minority in a majority British school, Moorjani says she was often the victim of bullying. Moorjani's parents are Indian, and because of her diverse cultural background, she grew up multilingual, speaking Sindhi, Cantonese, and English simultaneously. Moorjani always felt that she was not able to conform with her parents' wishes, who were traditional Indians and had arranged a marriage for her. A few days before her arranged wedding, Moorjani ran away. Her actions brought great shame upon her family, and for a long time she was cast out of Hong Kong's Indian community.

=== Near-death experience ===
In February 2002, while living and working in Hong Kong, Moorjani was diagnosed with lymphoma after finding a lump on her neck. Initially, Moorjani rejected conventional medicine. She had watched several people close to her die of cancer, including her brother-in-law and her best friend, despite extensive conventional treatments. Over the months that ensued, Moorjani experimented with various alternative healing practices to no avail. She subsequently underwent several conventional cancer treatments. However, by that point, despite beginning these treatments as she was brought into hospital, her doctors informed her and her family that it was "too late" to save her life. The lymphoma had spread throughout her body and had metastasized. At that point, all of Moorjani's organs had shut down, and she entered into a coma.

Moorjani came out of the coma 30 hours later. During those 30 hours, Moorjani asserts that she experienced many characteristic details of a near death experience. Her account includes an out-of-body experience with observations and awareness of physical surroundings. Moorjani said she had a strong reluctance to return to her suffering and dying physical body but was encouraged to return by her father and her best friend who told her that she needed to return and to "live her life fearlessly."

Subsequent to coming out of her coma, Moorjani's tumors shrank by about 70% within four days, and within five weeks she was cancer-free and released from the hospital, although she had to spend a few months in physiotherapy to regain her strength and the use of all her muscles and limbs. Moorjani remains cancer-free to this day.

=== Professional life ===
Moorjani submitted the description of her NDE and subsequent healing to the Near Death Experience Research Foundation (NDERF) website, a site owned and run by oncologist Jeffrey Long and his wife, Jody Long, a family law attorney.

Moorjani's story came to the attention of American self-help author, Wayne Dyer, who contacted his publishers, Hay House, asking them to locate her and suggest that she write a book, which they would publish.

Dying to Be Me was published in March 2012, and hit The New York Times bestsellers list two weeks after its release. Moorjani was then invited to be on Wayne Dyer's PBS special titled Wishes Fulfilled, and since then, has been interviewed on Fox And Friends, CNN's Anderson Cooper 360, National Geographic Channels International, Karen Davila's Headstart on ANC Philippines, and many others. Dying to Be Me has subsequently sold over a million copies worldwide, and has been published in more than 40 languages.

In January 2016, Moorjani's case attracted the attention of Dr. Oz, who scrutinized her medical records, and subsequently invited her to be on his show.

In the years following, Moorjani has published three additional books: What If This Is Heaven (Hay House, 2016), a self-published children's book Love: A Story About Who You Truly Are (2017), and, most recently, the self-empowering Sensitive Is the New Strong (Simon and Schuster, 2021).

Skeptics criticize Moorjani's message. Vicky Allen, journalist at The Herald Scotland, states "These people are at the centre of a disturbing approach to illness, and cancer in particular, that sees it as a disease to be tackled with the mind and positive thinking. It is a movement which many within the medical establishment believe is dangerous." Peter Allmark of Sheffield Hallam University, co-author of the 2011 paper "A Critique Of Positive Thinking In Cancer Care", denounces the approach as "quackery".

== Medical explanation of recovery from cancer ==
According to one article, oncologist–hematologist T.K. Chan, who treated Moorjani at the critical stage of her illness, ascribed her recovery to the draining of her lungs carried out by medical specialists after she had been admitted to hospital, followed by chemotherapy, which she had refused for four years. Chan stated, "with lymphoma, it's never too late," and "Hodgkin's disease is quite curable ... it can have a dramatic response to chemotherapy". In the same article, oncologist Peter Ko, who arranged to see Moorjani and all her medical records on a visit in November 2006, declared that chemotherapy could not have occasioned such a dramatic recovery, and also that it could have been highly toxic, considering the state of her failing organs. Ko stated, "either her mind or body was able to send a message to the cancer cells to turn off the mutated genes" and "chemotherapy does work well with Hodgkin's, but I've never seen it work like this".

== Personal life ==
Moorjani met her husband, Danny Moorjani, in Hong Kong, and they married in December 1995. Moorjani lives with her husband in the United States.

== Bibliography ==
- Moorjani, Anita (2021). Sensitive Is The New Strong: The Power of Empaths in an Increasingly Harsh World.
- Moorjani, Anita (2018). The Near Death Experience Meditation (Audio recordings). Think Big Records.
- Moorjani, Anita (2017). What If This Is Heaven?. Hay House Inc. ISBN 9781401943325. OCLC 976237932.
- Moorjani, Anita; DeMuro, Angie (2017). Love: A Story About Who You Truly Are. Amazon Digital Services LLC - Kdp. ISBN 9780988556881. OCLC 1020291361.
- Moorjani, Anita (2016). Heaven, an experiential journey: guided meditations for experiencing Heaven on Earth (Audio recordings). Think Big Records.
- Moorjani, Anita (2015). Dying to be Me: My Journey from Cancer, to Near Death, to True Healing. Hay House Publishers India Private Limited. ISBN 9789381431375. OCLC 929824902.
- Moorjani, Anita (2012). Deep Meditation for Healing. Hay House. ISBN 9781401940409. OCLC 1060743613.

=== Documentary ===
- Chopra, Deepak; Moorjani, Anita (2017). Heal (Video). Elevative Entertainment + The Orchard Films.

== See also ==
- Eben Alexander
- Dryhthelm
- List of New Thought writers
- New Age
- New Thought
- Self-help
- Spirituality
