= 90 Minutes in Heaven =

2004 book by Don Piper and Cecil Murphey

- Author: Don Piper; Cecil Murphey
- Subject: Autobiographical life-and-death experience
- Genre: Christian literature
- Set in: Texas
- Published: September 1, 2004
- Publisher: Fleming H. Revell
- Pages: 208

90 Minutes in Heaven is a 2004 Christian book written by Don Piper with Cecil Murphey. The book documents the author's death and resurrection experience in 1989. 90 Minutes in Heaven remained on the New York Times Bestseller List for more than five years and has sold over six million copies. The book has also been adapted into a feature-length film, released in theaters on September 11, 2015.

== Summary ==
On January 18, 1989, Baptist minister Don Piper was on his way home from a conference in Texas when a semi-trailer truck struck his Ford Escort while crossing a bridge. Piper describes that he was crushed by the roof of his car, the steering wheel impaled his chest, and the dashboard collapsed on his legs. When paramedics arrived, they could not find any sign of life in Piper and covered him with a tarp leaving him there from 11:45 AM until 1:15 PM as a fellow pastor prayed over him while waiting for the medical examiner to arrive. According to Piper, he went straight to Heaven and experienced things he describes as amazing and beautiful, including meeting family members such as his great-grandmother and joining a heavenly choir that proceeded into the Gates of Heaven. Piper, an ordained minister since 1985, has recounted his narrative before 3,000 live audiences that included more than 1.5 million people altogether, and has appeared on numerous television and radio programs.

== See also ==
- 23 Minutes in Hell, 2006 book by Bill Wiese recounting the author's supposed experiences in Hell in 1998
- Eben Alexander, author of the 2012 book Proof of Heaven: A Neurosurgeon's Journey into the Afterlife
- The Boy Who Came Back From Heaven, a fabricated account of a near-death experience
- Heaven Is for Real: A Little Boy's Astounding Story of His Trip to Heaven and Back, 2010 book by Todd Burpo and Lynn Vincent about a near-death experience reported by Burpo's then-four-year-old son, Colton
- Howard Storm, author of the book My Descent Into Death about his near-death experience
- Pam Reynolds case
- Referenced in Imagine Heaven, a book by John Burke that summarizes over 1000 near-death experiences and compares them with the Bible
