= Hayden Christensen =

Canadian actor (born 1981)

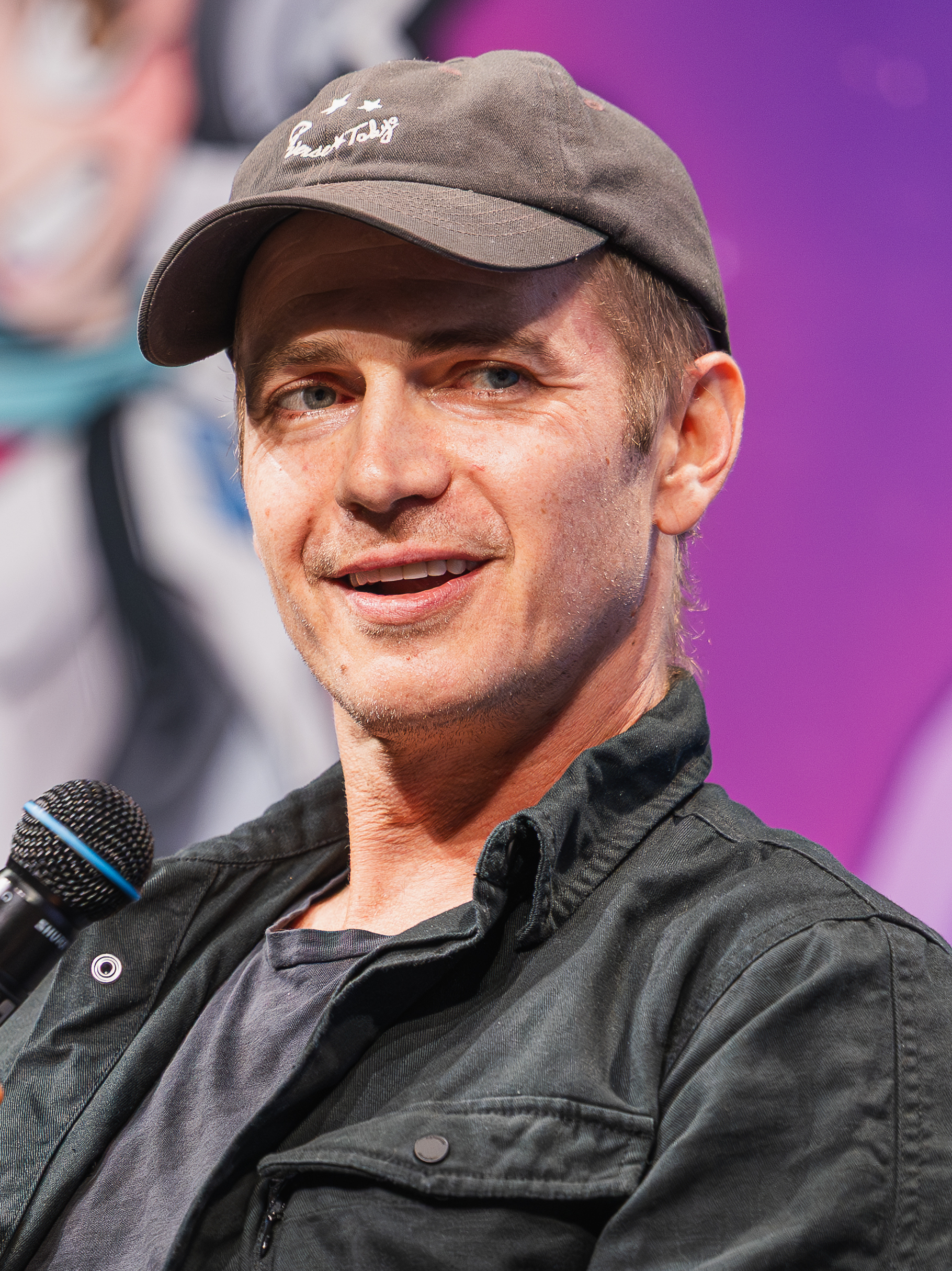
- Christensen in 2026
- Born: April 19, 1981 (age 45); Vancouver, British Columbia, Canada
- Occupation: Actor
- Years active: 1993–present
- Partner: Rachel Bilson (2007–2017)
- Children: 1
- Relatives: Tove Christensen (brother)

Hayden Christensen (born April 19, 1981) is a Canadian actor. He gained recognition for his portrayal of Anakin Skywalker / Darth Vader in the Star Wars media franchise. He first appeared in the prequel trilogy films, Star Wars: Episode II – Attack of the Clones (2002) and Star Wars: Episode III – Revenge of the Sith (2005), and later reprised his role in the Disney+ series Obi-Wan Kenobi (2022) and Ahsoka (2023).

Christensen began his career on Canadian television at the age of 13, then diversified into American television in the late 1990s. His early work includes The Virgin Suicides (1999), Life as a House (2001), and Shattered Glass (2003). He earned praise for his performances as Sam in Life as a House and as Stephen Glass in Shattered Glass. Christensen's honours include the nominations for a Golden Globe Award and a Screen Actors Guild Award, as well as the Cannes Film Festival's Trophée Chopard. His other notable works include Awake (2007), Jumper (2008), Takers (2010), and Little Italy (2018).

== Early life ==
Christensen was born in Vancouver, British Columbia, to Alie, an American speechwriter, and David Christensen, a Canadian computer programmer and communications executive. His father is of Danish descent, and his mother has Swedish and Italian ancestry. Christensen is one of four children, with three actor siblings: older brother Tove, older sister Hejsa, and younger sister Kaylen. He spent summers on Long Island with his maternal grandmother, Rose Schwartz.

Christensen attended Unionville High School in Markham, Ontario. He was an athlete in high school, playing hockey competitively and tennis on a provincial level. He attended the Actors Studio in New York City; he studied as well at the Arts York drama program in high school. After accompanying his older sister to her agent's office after she landed a role in a Pringles commercial, he began being cast in commercials as well, including for Triaminic cough syrup in 1988.

== Career ==
=== 1993–2005: Early work ===
Christensen made his acting debut in September 1993, when, at the age of 12, he played a supporting role on the German-Canadian television series Family Passions. The following year, he had a minor role in John Carpenter's In the Mouth of Madness. From 1995 through 1999, he appeared in several films and television series, including Harrison Bergeron, Forever Knight, Goosebumps, The Virgin Suicides, and Are You Afraid of the Dark?

He acquired wider notice while starring in Fox Family Channel's television series Higher Ground in 2000, portraying a teen who was sexually molested by his stepmother, and then turned to drugs in his despair.

Christensen's critically acclaimed portrayal of a misunderstood teenager in Life as a House (2001) earned him Golden Globe and SAG Award nominations, as well as the National Board of Review's award for Breakthrough Performance of the Year. However, the performance did not receive widespread public notice. In 2002, Christensen made his London theatre debut with Jake Gyllenhaal and Anna Paquin in This Is Our Youth.

He went on to receive positive reviews for 2003's Shattered Glass, which tells the true story of journalist Stephen Glass, who was discovered to be fabricating stories as a writer for The New Republic and other publications. Peter Travers of Rolling Stone wrote, "Hayden Christensen is sensational as Glass, finding the wonder boy and the weasel in a disturbed kid flying high on a fame he hasn't earned."

In 2005, Christensen made his Broadway debut when he appeared briefly in a 10-minute play. Also in the same year, he took part in the fifth annual "24 Hour Plays" benefit, which raises cash for nonprofit groups in the Big Apple.

=== 2000–2005: Star Wars prequel trilogy ===
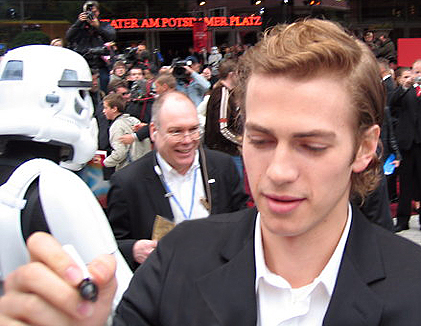
Christensen at the premiere of Star Wars: Episode III in Berlin in 2005

On May 12, 2000, Christensen announced that he would be starring as an adult Anakin Skywalker in Star Wars: Episode II – Attack of the Clones (2002) and Star Wars: Episode III – Revenge of the Sith (2005); Skywalker was previously portrayed by Jake Lloyd as a child in Star Wars: Episode I – The Phantom Menace (1999). The casting director reviewed about 1,500 other candidates before director George Lucas selected Christensen. Lucas is quoted as saying that he chose Christensen because he "needed an actor who has that presence of the Dark Side". This was essential to solidify the story that Lucas was trying to tell: Anakin Skywalker's fall from grace and transformation into Darth Vader. Christensen was cast after Leonardo DiCaprio turned down the film.

Christensen admitted to Star Wars Insider in 2005, that he found it difficult bridging the gap between Jake Lloyd's Anakin as an innocent boy and the villain Vader was introduced as in the original trilogy. While his co-star, Ewan McGregor had Alec Guinness to emulate, Christensen had no one to emulate. He said, "Ultimately, I had to be the linear connection between the Anakin that Jake Lloyd played, and capture Darth Vader as portrayed by Sebastian Shaw when he was demasked in Return of the Jedi."

During the production of Revenge of the Sith, Christensen asked Lucas if a special Vader suit could be constructed to fit his own body, rather than have a different actor don one of the original sets of Vader armour worn by David Prowse. Lucas agreed, and a suit was engineered to fit Christensen's frame, even including extensions to allow for the actor to attain Vader's 6 ft 6 in (1.98 m) height. His voice as the "robotic" Vader, however, was dubbed over by James Earl Jones, who first made the voice famous in the original trilogy.

In one of the most controversial changes made to the Star Wars original trilogy, Christensen was inserted into the 2004 DVD release of Return of the Jedi, where he replaced Shaw as the Force ghost of the redeemed Anakin Skywalker. Lucas wanted Anakin's inner person to return to who he was before he turned to the dark side. Christensen insisted this was done without his knowledge, an act that was confirmed by Lucasfilm itself in the featurette "Return of the Jedi: What has changed?" as seen on the official website to commemorate the 2006 DVDs.

Christensen's performance in both Episode II and Episode III received generally mixed reviews from critics, (Note: Attributed to multiple references:) although contemporary reviews note that his performance was mostly affected by Lucas' directing and the dialogue, and has since seen positive reappraisal in retrospect. However, long before the reappraisal, Christensen received praise from the cast and crew while filming the two prequels. At the time of the release of Attack of the Clones, C-3PO actor Anthony Daniels described Christensen as "such a hero, and [a] terrific, clever actor." He also witnessed Christensen in his Darth Vader costume on set during filming for Revenge of the Sith. He said, "I've lived with Darth Vader for years, but there was something about Hayden being in the costume.... He had a presence. I cared that this nice guy had become this ultimate vision of evil." Following the reappraisal, in his 2019 memoirs, Daniels praised Christensen and McGregor for their lightsaber duel in Revenge of Sith describing them as "marvellous." In 2022, when reflecting on the prequel trilogy and the reappraisal, Christensen said, "It's like those films had a gestation period, where they needed a little time to ferment in the public psyche. The reception that the films have now, it's very heartwarming."

Christensen was named in both People magazine's 50 Most Beautiful People and Teen People's 25 Hottest Stars under 25. For his performance in Episode III, he won the MTV Movie Award for Best Villain.

=== 2006–2018: Further work, films and television ===
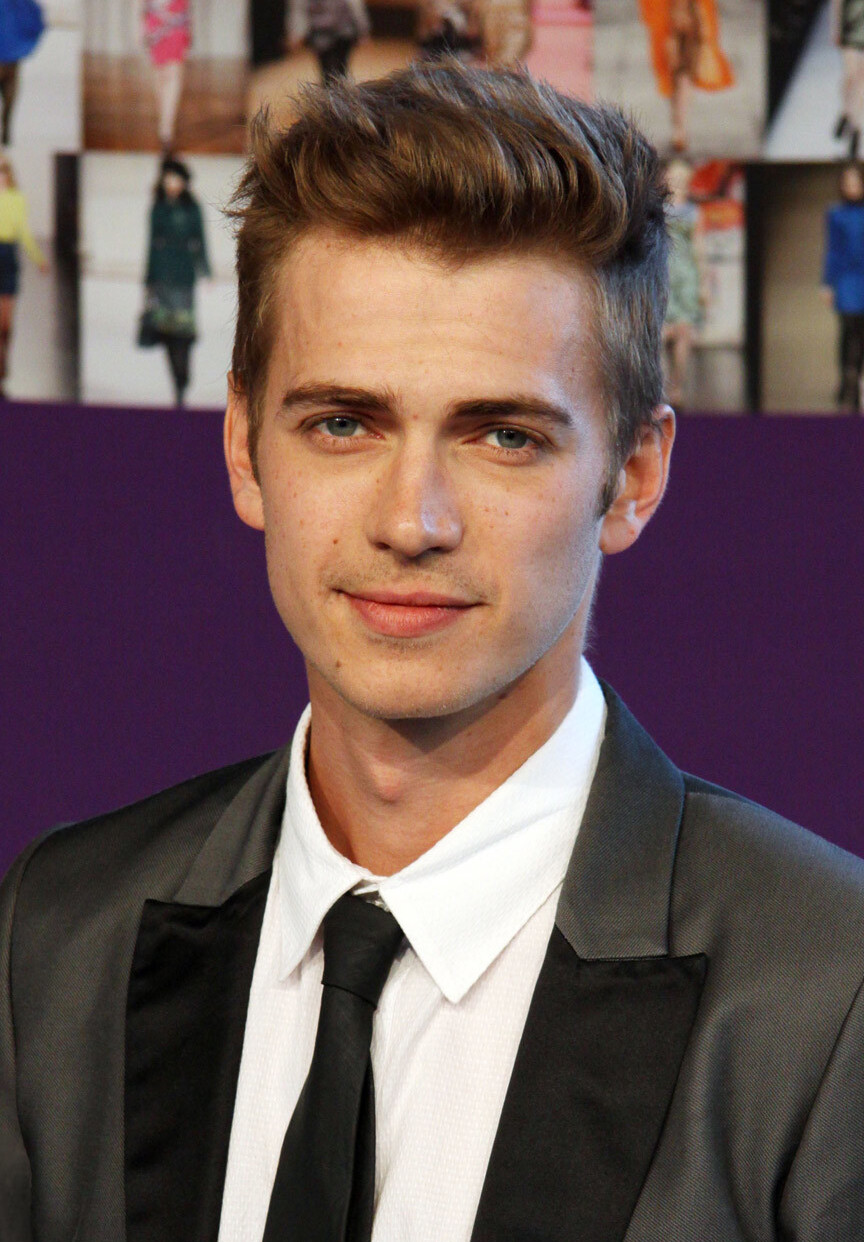
Hayden Christensen in 2010

Between 2006 and 2007, he starred in Awake, with Jessica Alba, which tells the story of a man who remains awake but paralyzed during heart surgery, and co-starred in Factory Girl, opposite Sienna Miller and Guy Pearce. Christensen next co-starred with Samuel L. Jackson, Jamie Bell, and Rachel Bilson in the film Jumper, the story of a young man who discovers he has the ability to teleport; the film was released on February 14, 2008. Bilson and Christensen co-starred again in the same segment of the film New York, I Love You. Christensen appeared opposite Mischa Barton in Virgin Territory, which was released directly-to-DVD in North America on August 26, 2008. The film, based on The Decameron, is about a group of people who escape the Black Plague epidemic by hiding out in a Tuscan villa in Italy.

In October 2009, Christensen started shooting the horror film Vanishing on 7th Street, directed by Brad Anderson, with Thandiwe Newton and John Leguizamo. Christensen appeared in the crime drama Takers with Matt Dillon, Idris Elba and Paul Walker, released in the United States on August 27, 2010. Quantum Quest: A Cassini Space Odyssey is the fourth film in which Christensen stars with Jackson.

In the early 2000s, Christensen formed a production company called Forest Park Pictures alongside his brother Tove. The company produced two films that Christensen appeared in Shattered Glass and Vanishing on 7th Street. In 2010, Christensen sued USA Network over allegations that they stole his idea for the TV show Royal Pains. The suit alleges that Christensen met with USA to pitch a similar series entitled Housecalls. During the meeting, Christensen alleges, he was never informed that a similar program was in development. Although a federal judge at first dismissed Christensen's lawsuit in 2011, in June 2012, the 2nd Circuit Court of Appeals reversed this decision and remanded the case back to the district court for further proceedings, in what was considered a legal victory for Christensen.

On May 20, 2013, during the Cannes Film Festival, the Russian company Enjoy Movies announced the creation of Glacier Films, an alliance company with Christensen and his brother Tove. Over a three-year period, Glacier Films intended to make 11 "micro-budget" movies costing $1.5M each. The first project, American Heist, starring Christensen, Adrien Brody and Jordana Brewster, started filming in June 2013. It is a remake of Steve McQueen's The Great St. Louis Bank Robbery. In 2014, he starred in the American-Chinese-Canadian film Outcast, an action drama, alongside Nicolas Cage and Liu Yifei.

In 2015, Christensen starred in the film 90 Minutes in Heaven co-starring Kate Bosworth and directed by Michael Polish, based on the best-selling novel by the same name. In 2015, filming began of an unreleased World War II Nazi zombies horror movie titled Untöt, set to star Christensen. In 2017, he was in the film First Kill alongside Bruce Willis. In 2018, he appeared in Canadian-American romantic comedy Little Italy with Emma Roberts and the following year he starred in Argentine-Canadian science fiction film The Last Man alongside Harvey Keitel.

=== 2019–present: Return to the Star Wars franchise ===
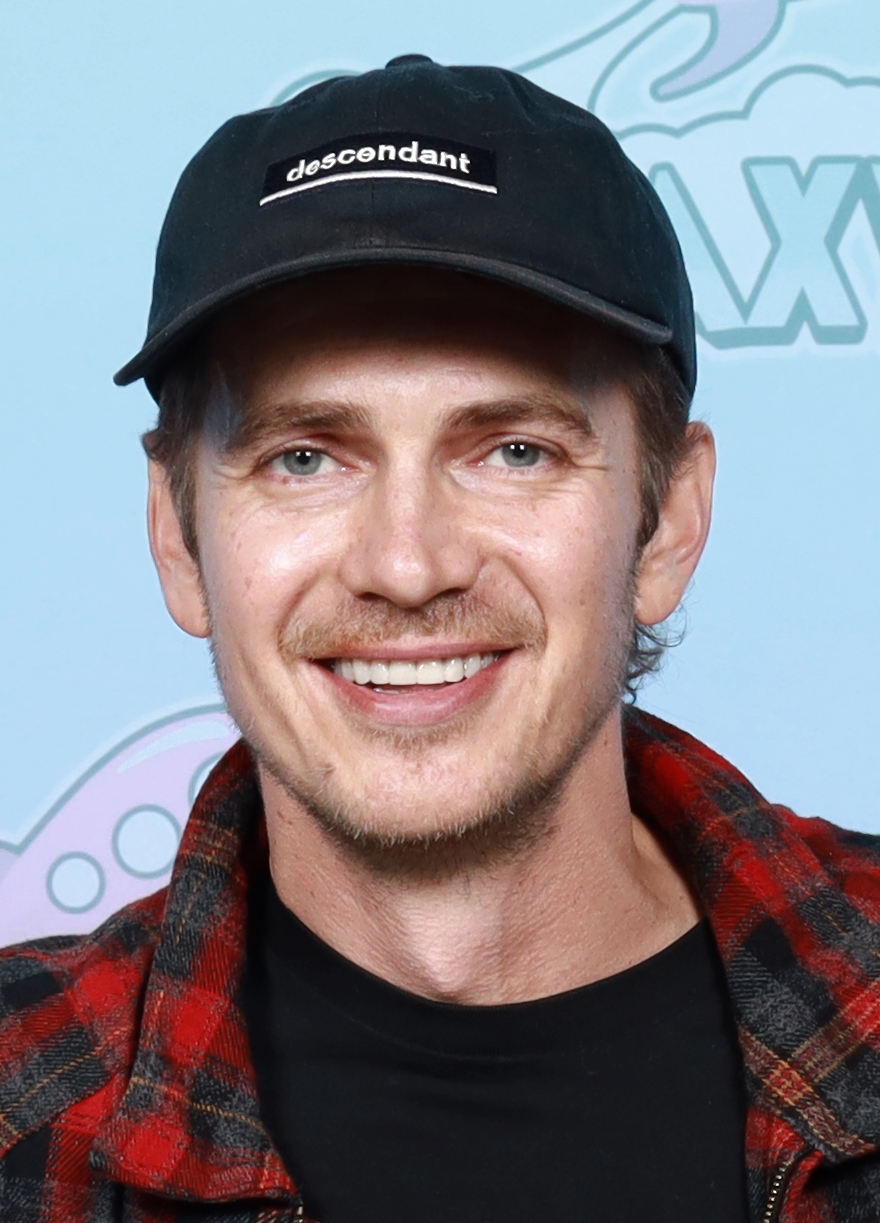
Christensen at GalaxyCon Columbus in 2024

In 2019, a few years after the Walt Disney Company acquired Lucasfilm, Christensen returned to the role of Anakin Skywalker, providing a voice cameo of the character's voice in Star Wars: The Rise of Skywalker. Although Christensen was not involved in Rogue One, he praised the film saying, "I loved what they did with it. The character predates me, and it's always been a collective effort in a lot of ways. I thought it was brilliant."

Christensen also received a voice credit as Anakin Skywalker jointly alongside Matt Lanter for the penultimate episode of the final season of the animated television series Star Wars: The Clone Wars entitled "Shattered" despite the fact the dialogue used for the episode spoken by Christensen was reused archival audio from Revenge of the Sith. He has been attending several conventions as part of Star Wars Celebration as a guest since 2017. (Note: Attributed to multiple references:) In April 2019, Christensen met Lanter at Star Wars Celebration Chicago and said to him, "I love what you guys are doing. Thanks for keeping Star Wars alive."

On October 22, 2021, it was reported that Christensen would also reprise the role for the Disney+ series Ahsoka.

In May 2022, Christensen reprised his role of Anakin Skywalker / Darth Vader for the Obi-Wan Kenobi limited series on Disney+. His portrayal earned positive reviews from critics, noting a huge improvement from his performance in the prequel trilogy. He also appeared in the documentary special, Obi-Wan Kenobi: A Jedi's Return, which premiered at the Disney+ Day event on September 8, 2022. In 2023, Christensen appeared in four episodes of Ahsoka and was digitally de-aged. He was first seen wearing his outfit from Revenge of the Sith and later another outfit similar to the one Anakin wore in the early series of The Clone Wars. His portrayal earned even more positive reviews.

On 19 April 2025, during one of the panels at Star Wars Celebration Japan, Christensen said that he would reprise his role in the second season of Ahsoka. On 25 April 2025, Christensen and Jackson surprised the audience at a screening of the Revenge of the Sith 20th anniversary re-release in Los Angeles. Christensen told the audience that he had "so many amazing memories of making" Revenge of the Sith.

== Personal life ==
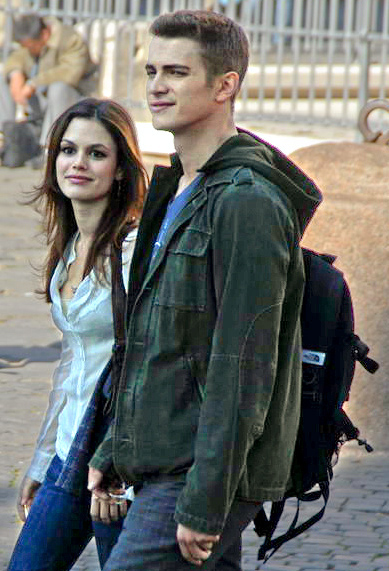
Christensen with then-girlfriend Rachel Bilson filming Jumper in Rome in 2006

In 2007, Christensen began dating actress Rachel Bilson, with whom he starred in Jumper and New York, I Love You. They became engaged on December 25, 2008. In mid-2010, they broke up, but began dating again a few months later. (Note: Attributed to multiple references:) On October 29, 2014, Bilson gave birth to their daughter. Christensen and Bilson separated in September 2017.

In 2007, Christensen bought a farm near Uxbridge, Ontario. He noted in 2008 that he had been renovating the property himself and devoting time to learning about "livestock, crops, and agricultural machinery". His farm also features a vegetable garden and an apple orchard. In November 2013, Christensen collaborated with Canadian fashion chain RW&CO to release a men's clothing line inspired by his farm. In 2015, Christensen explained to Los Angeles Times another reason he bought the farm was because "he didn't want to grow too entitled as an actor" after starring in Star Wars. Stating "I guess I felt like I had this great thing in Star Wars that provided all these opportunities and gave me a career, but it all kind of felt a little too handed to me. I didn't want to go through life feeling like I was just riding a wave," he said. He acknowledged that the break would impact his work, but wasn't bothered by it. Christensen continues to be hands on with his farm; in 2023 he revealed at a convention that he had hand built multiple fishing ponds on his farm, that contain water features, complete with plumbing that Christensen did himself.

Christensen is an avid Toronto Maple Leafs fan. He also enjoys playing the piano. In 2008, Christensen performed a public service announcement for DoSomething's Teens for Jeans Campaign. He modelled in Louis Vuitton's advertising, and was also named as the face of Lacoste's fragrance, Lacoste Challenge. He was featured in RED's Lazarus Effect Campaign, which is intended to increase awareness for its efforts to fight HIV/AIDS in Africa.

In 2018, Christensen played in the annual Soccer Aid charity match playing for the World XI team to raise funds for UNICEF.

On August 15, 2025, Christensen threw out the ceremonial first pitch at a Chicago Cubs game. He walked to the mound wearing a Cubs jersey with the number 66, a nod to "Order 66" from Star Wars.

== Filmography ==
=== Film ===
Year	Title	Character	Notes
1994	In the Mouth of Madness	Paper boy	
1995	Law of the Jungle	Young John Ryan	
1998	All I Wanna Do	Tinka's date	
1999	The Virgin Suicides	Jake Hill Conley	
2001	Life as a House	Sam Monroe	
2002	Star Wars: Episode II – Attack of the Clones	Anakin Skywalker	
2003	Shattered Glass	Stephen Glass	
2004	Return of the Jedi	Anakin Skywalker	Uncredited; featured in DVD Special Edition re-release (replacing Sebastian Shaw)
2005	Star Wars: Episode III – Revenge of the Sith	Anakin Skywalker / Darth Vader	Voice of fully suited/masked Darth Vader provided by James Earl Jones
2006	Factory Girl	Billy Quinn	
2007	Awake	Clayton "Clay" Beresford, Jr.	
2007	Virgin Territory	Lorenzo de Lamberti	
2008	Jumper	David Rice	
2009	New York, I Love You	Ben	Segment: "Jiang Wen"
2010	Takers	AJ	
2010	Vanishing on 7th Street	Luke Ryder	
2010	Quantum Quest: A Cassini Space Odyssey	Jammer	Voice
2014	American Heist	James "Jimmy" Kelly	
2014	Outcast	Jacob	
2015	90 Minutes in Heaven	Don Piper	
2017	First Kill	William "Will" Beeman	Direct-to-video
2018	Little Italy	Leonard "Leo" Campo	
2019	The Last Man	Kurt	Direct-to-video
2019	Star Wars: The Rise of Skywalker	Anakin Skywalker	Vocal cameo

=== Television ===
Year	Title	Role	Notes
1993	Family Passions	Skip McDeere	Unknown episodes
1993	E.N.G.	Joey	Episode: "Honour or Wealth"
1995	Love and Betrayal: The Mia Farrow Story	Fletcher	Television film
1995	Harrison Bergeron	Eric	Television film
1996	No Greater Love	Teddy Winfield	Television film
1996	Forever Knight	Andre	Episode: "Fallen Idol"
1997	Goosebumps	Zane	Episode: "Night of the Living Dummy III"
1999	Free Fall	Patrick Brennan	Television film
1999	Real Kids, Real Adventures	Eli Goodner	Episode: "Paralyzed: The Eli Goodner Story"
1999	Are You Afraid of the Dark?	Kirk	Episode: "The Tale of Bigfoot Ridge"
1999	The Famous Jett Jackson	Steven	Episode: "Popularity"
2000	Trapped in a Purple Haze	Orin Krieg	Television film
2000	Higher Ground	Scott Barringer	22 episodes
2001	R2-D2: Beneath the Dome	Himself	Television film; mockumentary
2019–2020	Star Wars Galaxy of Adventures	Anakin Skywalker	Voice; 2 episodes (archival material only)
2020	Star Wars: The Clone Wars	Anakin Skywalker	Episode: "Shattered" (character voice credit shared with Matt Lanter using archival audio from Revenge of the Sith)
2022	Obi-Wan Kenobi	Anakin Skywalker / Darth Vader	Miniseries; 5 episodes (archival material only in episode: "Part I")
2023–present	Star Wars: Ahsoka	Anakin Skywalker / Darth Vader	4 episodes

== Awards and nominations ==
Year	Award	Category	Nominated work	Result
2001	Young Hollywood Award	One to Watch – Male	Life as a House	Won
2001	National Board of Review of Motion Pictures	Best Breakthrough Performance by an Actor	Life as a House	Won
2001	Golden Globe Awards	Best Supporting Actor – Motion Picture	Life as a House	Nominated
2001	Screen Actors Guild Awards	Outstanding Actor in a Supporting Role – Motion Picture	Life as a House	Nominated
2001	Dallas–Fort Worth Film Critics Association Awards	Best Supporting Actor	Life as a House	Nominated
2001	Online Film Critics Society Awards	Best Breakthrough Performance	Life as a House	Nominated
2001	Chicago Film Critics Association Awards	Most Promising Performer	Life as a House	Nominated
2002	Cannes Film Festival	Male Revelation	Star Wars: Episode II – Attack of the Clones	Won
2002	Golden Raspberry Awards	Worst Supporting Actor	Star Wars: Episode II – Attack of the Clones	Won
2002	Golden Raspberry Awards	Worst Screen Couple (shared with Natalie Portman)	Star Wars: Episode II – Attack of the Clones	Nominated
2002	Saturn Awards	Best Performance by a Younger Actor	Star Wars: Episode II – Attack of the Clones	Nominated
2002	Saturn Awards	Cinescape Genre Face of the Future Award	Star Wars: Episode II – Attack of the Clones	Nominated
2002	Teen Choice Awards	Choice Movie Actor: Action	Star Wars: Episode II – Attack of the Clones	Nominated
2002	Teen Choice Awards	Choice Movie: Chemistry (shared with Natalie Portman)	Star Wars: Episode II – Attack of the Clones	Nominated
2002	Teen Choice Awards	Choice Movie: Liplock (shared with Natalie Portman)	Star Wars: Episode II – Attack of the Clones	Nominated
2002	Teen Choice Awards	Choice Movie: Male Breakout Star	Star Wars: Episode II – Attack of the Clones	Nominated
2003	Las Palmas Film Festival	Best Actor (shared with Peter Sarsgaard)	Shattered Glass	Won
2003	Satellite Awards	Best Actor – Motion Picture Drama	Shattered Glass	Nominated
2005	ShoWest	Male Star of Tomorrow	Star Wars: Episode III – Revenge of the Sith	Won
2005	MTV Movie Awards	Best Villain	Star Wars: Episode III – Revenge of the Sith	Won
2005	Golden Raspberry Awards	Worst Supporting Actor	Star Wars: Episode III – Revenge of the Sith	Won
2005	Saturn Awards	Best Actor	Star Wars: Episode III – Revenge of the Sith	Nominated
2005	MTV Movie Awards	Best Fight (shared with Ewan McGregor)	Star Wars: Episode III – Revenge of the Sith	Nominated
2005	Teen Choice Awards	Choice Movie Actor: Action	Star Wars: Episode III – Revenge of the Sith	Nominated
2005	Teen Choice Awards	Choice Movie: Villain	Star Wars: Episode III – Revenge of the Sith	Nominated
2007	Golden Raspberry Awards	Worst Screen Combo (shared with Jessica Alba)	Awake	Nominated
2008	MTV Movie Awards	Best Fight (shared with Jamie Bell)	Jumper	Nominated
2010	Black Reel Awards	Best Ensemble	Takers	Nominated
2022	Saturn Awards	Best Guest-Starring Performance in a Streaming Television Series	Obi-Wan Kenobi	Won
2023	Critics' Choice Super Awards	Best Villain in a Series	Obi-Wan Kenobi	Nominated
