= Howard Storm =

Howard Storm may refer to:

- Howard Storm (author) (born 1946), American author, best known for the book My Descent Into Death
- Howard Storm (director) (1931–2026), American film, television director and actor
