= 23 Minutes in Hell =

2006 book by Christian Bill Wiese

- Book cover, first edition
- Author: Bill Wiese
- Language: English
- Publisher: Charisma House
- Publication date: 30 January 2006
- ISBN: 978-1591858829

23 Minutes in Hell is a personal book written by Protestant Christian Bill Wiese and published in 2006. The book recounts what the author claims were his experiences in hell in 1998. The book and the underlying story within it are the topic of a series of speaking tours given by Wiese, predominantly to Protestant churches and other Christian organizations. He says his visits to hell were out-of-body experiences that were also visions, one lasting 23 minutes and the other 10 seconds.

== Description ==
Wiese states that he had been a Christian since 1970, but had never studied hell before his experiences on the night of November 22, 1998. According to the book, Wiese, then a real estate broker, found himself in a cell approximately 15 feet (4.6 m) high and 10 feet (3.0 m) by 15 feet (4.6 m) in area, where there were two foul-smelling beasts, personifications of evil and terror, who spoke in a blasphemous language. Wiese says that the creatures had strength approximately one thousand times greater than a man's strength.

Wiese states that he heard the screams of the billions of damned people in hell. He states that he then encountered Jesus, who told him to tell other people that hell is real. Wiese states that his first experience ended with him lying on the floor of his living room, screaming in horror.

== Response ==
23 Minutes in Hell spent at least three weeks on the extended New York Times Best Seller list for paperback nonfiction.

Lawrence Yang, a columnist for the Filipino-American newspaper Asian Journal, devoted two columns to Wiese's book, treating it as an accurate description of hell. Freelance writer Billy Bruce wrote in the Ironton Tribune, "I totally believe Bill Wiese's vision and hope that many others will read his book, along with the Bible ... Read Bill Wiese's book, 23 Minutes in Hell. Then, live your life like you don't want to spend one second in that place."

=== Criticism ===
The claims in Wiese's book have received sardonic reactions from some writers, both in the Christian and secular press. Rob Moll of Christianity Today, noting Wiese's statement that hell "was hot – far beyond any possibility of sustaining life", commented, "Thankfully, it being hell, everyone but Wiese had already died." John Sutherland, writing about Wiese's book in the New Statesman, remarked that Wiese "rather lamely" describes the sound of billions of people screaming as "annoying".

Other writers have expressed even harsher views. Steven Wells wrote in the Philadelphia Weekly that "Wiese is either wrong or he's right. And if he's right, then God is an insane tyrant." A writer for the Northern Iowan, a student newspaper at the University of Northern Iowa, described the book as "23 minutes of nonsense" and portrayed the book's success as a sign of the faults of Christianity and religion in general.

== See also ==
- The Boy Who Came Back from Heaven
- Heaven Is For Real
- Proof of Heaven
- 90 Minutes in Heaven
- Howard Storm (author)
- Problem of Hell
