= 90 Minutes in Heaven (film) =

- Theatrical release poster
- Directed by: Michael Polish
- Screenplay by: Michael Polish
- Based on: 90 Minutes in Heaven by Don Piper and Cecil Murphey
- Produced by: Randall Emmett; Dawn Parouse; George Furla; Rick Jackson; Harrison Powell; Timothy C. Sullivan
- Starring: Hayden Christensen; Kate Bosworth; Dwight Yoakam; Michael W. Smith; Fred Thompson
- Cinematography: M. David Mullen
- Edited by: Cary Gries
- Music by: Michael W. Smith; Tyler Michael Smith
- Production companies: Emmett/Furla Films; Family Christian Entertainment; Giving Films
- Distributed by: Samuel Goldwyn Films
- Release date: September 11, 2015
- Running time: 121 minutes
- Country: United States
- Language: English
- Budget: $5 million
- Box office: $4.8 million

90 Minutes in Heaven is a 2015 American Christian drama film directed by Michael Polish and starring Hayden Christensen, Kate Bosworth, Hudson Meek, Dwight Yoakam, Michael W. Smith, and Michael Harding. It is based on the bestselling book of the same name. It is the first film by Giving Films, a sister company to retail chain Family Christian Stores, and though the company announced plans to donate all profits from the film to charitable organizations, the poorly reviewed film showed a loss at the box office.

== plot ==
Baptist minister Don Piper is involved in a horrific car crash, pronounced dead at the scene and covered by a tarp. Ninety minutes later, having been brought to a hospital, he returns to life and claims to have seen Heaven and visited with deceased relatives while there.

== Cast ==
- Hayden Christensen as Don Piper
- Kate Bosworth as Eva Piper
- Hudson Meek as Chris Piper
- Dwight Yoakam as Cecil Beaumont
- Fred Thompson as Jay B. Perkins
- Michael W. Smith as Cliff McArdle
- Michael Harding as Dick Onerecker
- Rhoda Griffis as Principal Mary Nell
- Marshall Bell as Dr. Greider
- Nicholas Pryor as J.V. Thomas
- Ashley Bratcher as Susan Long
- Vanessa Cloke as Suzan Maulden

== Production ==
The project was shot in Atlanta, Georgia, and the shooting finished in March 2015. Since its publication, Don Piper's book was twice on the New York Times Best Seller list, was listed as a USA Today best-seller, and has sold 7 million copies in 46 languages.

The producers chose to stay as true as possible to the book which inspired the film:

I think a lot of people read books, especially true stories, and then the movie is not even close to the real story and they make up things. I told Don that I thought the story stood for itself and my commitment to him was that it would be true to the book, and be true period.

Actress Kate Bosworth stated she "was amazed how Piper's story affects so many people" and that she felt blessed "to be a part of the movie's cast." Filming began in January 2015, and by March 8, 2015, filming had wrapped and the project went into post-production.

== Release ==
=== Home media ===
90 Minutes in Heaven was released on DVD and Blu-ray on December 1, 2015.

== Reception ==
90 Minutes in Heaven has received negative reviews from critics. As of December 2020, the film holds a 26% approval rating on Rotten Tomatoes, based on 23 reviews with an average rating of 4.6/10. Metacritic gives the film a score of 28 out of 100, based on reviews from 9 critics, indicating "generally unfavorable" reviews.
