= Outcast (2014 film) =

Film by Nick Powel

- Chinese theatrical release poster
- Directed by: Nick Powell
- Written by: James Dormer
- Produced by: Jeremy Bolt; Marc Charette; Léonard Glowinski; Gary Hamilton; Karine Martin; Christopher Milburn; George Mizen; Mia Zhang; Xun Zhang; Mark Canton
- Starring: Hayden Christensen; Nicolas Cage; Liu Yifei; Ji Ke Jun Yi; Andy On
- Cinematography: Joel Ransom
- Edited by: Olivier Gourlay; Nicolas Trembasiewicz
- Music by: Guillaume Roussel
- Production companies: Canal+; Media Max Productions; Notorious Films; 22h22
- Distributed by: Entertainment One (US); Yunnan Film Group (China); Telefilm Canada (Canada)
- Release dates: September 22, 2014 (Beijing premiere); February 6, 2015 (United States); April 3, 2015 (China)
- Running time: 99 minutes
- Countries: Canada; China; United States
- Language: English
- Budget: $25 million
- Box office: $5.1 million

Outcast is a 2014 action film, directed by Nick Powell in his directorial debut and written by James Dormer. It stars Hayden Christensen, Nicolas Cage, Liu Yifei, Ji Ke Jun Yi, and Andy On.

The film was slated for release on September 26, 2014, in China, but was postponed to April 3, 2015. The film received negative reviews from critics.

== Plot ==
During the Crusades, young commander Jacob leads an army including Gallain in the slaughter of an Arab city. Gallain pleads with Jacob to leave the people alone, claiming killing them is not God's will, and go East. Gallain witnesses Jacob become increasingly violent and leaves.

Three years later in Song China, a dying Emperor chooses his young son Prince Zhao to be his successor, giving him the imperial seal and sending him away in the care of his older sister, Princess Lian. Shortly thereafter, their sadistic older brother, Prince Shing, murders the King in a fit of rage after having been passed over as heir. Shing assumes command of the Emperor's Black Guard, ordering the deaths of his siblings in order to obtain the seal and the legitimacy of the throne. The guards and army only cooperate under fear of retribution.

Zhao and Lian make it to a tavern before their horse dies. Inside they ask for help, but the Black Guard catch up to them. Jacob, though high on opium, defends them and kills the guards before moving on, refusing to escort them. Later on, remembering the horrors of combat, he decides to assist them. Traveling through a village destroyed by the Black Guard, they rescue a girl, Xiaolei. They attempt to take refuge in the desert city Jingshao. They are betrayed by their hosts, who summon the Black Guard, hoping to win the price on their heads. This forces them to fight their way out and escape by boat to the Silver Mountain, where some bandits Jacob originally sought take refuge.

Jacob is injured and the others are captured by the bandits. Jacob awakens to find Gallain saved them, though he is now known as the White Ghost. Jacob sought out Gallain to explain to him that he did not murder women and children in the Crusades as Gallain believed, and they reconcile. Shortly thereafter, Shing and the Black Guard corner them at the bandit hideout. After intense fighting, Gallain is killed. Jacob duels Shing; as Shing gains the upper hand, Lian intervenes and is stabbed by Shing. Jacob, enraged, overpowers Shing and kills him. With Shing's threat eliminated, the leader of the Black Guard swears loyalty to Prince Zhao.

Jacob and Lian survive their injuries and they, Zhao and Xiaolei are escorted by the Black Guard to the city, where Zhao is recognized as the new Emperor. Jacob, however, still tormented by his past and fearful of the future, leaves Lian and buries Gallain before he resumes traveling on his own.

== Cast ==
- Hayden Christensen as Jacob
- Nicolas Cage as Gallain
- Liu Yifei as Lian
- Ji Ke Jun Yi as Mei
- Andy On as Shing
- Anoja Dias Bolt as Anika
- Byron Lawson as Captain Peng

== Production ==
James Dormer wrote the script for Outcast in the year 2000.

In November 2012, it was reported that the government of the Chinese province of Yunnan would be partnering with an unnamed Hollywood partner on an international co-production titled Outcast starring Nicolas Cage and Hayden Christensen. The Chinese National Radio and Television Administration was vocal in its support of the project hoping it would encourage further co-productions centered around Chinese culture.

=== Filming ===
Principal photography started in November 2012 in Beijing, and the Hebei and Yunnan provinces of China.

== Release ==
Initially, Outcast was due to have been released Friday in China on some 26% of screens in the country, or more than 5,000 theaters, on September 26, 2014. However, hours before its scheduled release, co-financier Arclight Films was informed via email from via email from distributor and co-financier Yunnan Film Group that the film would not be released with no explanation given as to why. This led to Arclight doing damage control on the film as China was the film's largest potential market and its cancellation effected the day-and-date release of neighboring Asian markets in Malaysia, Singapore, and Vietnam. A last minute withdrawal from release is not unusual in China as Django Unchained had been subject to such an event, but Outcast being a locally made co-production with input from a local Chinese company was noted as more of an aberration. In November 2014, it was reported that Outcast would be given a new release date of January 2015 in China followed by a North American release in February with Entertainment One in final negotiations for the distribution rights from Yunnan Film Group.

Reasons for the abrupt cancelation of the film's original release were not clarified with some sources speculating that Yunnan Film Group had financial difficulties or were not able to book the number of screens they wanted for the release while other commentary suggested that Chinese censors had reconsidered their initial approval due to the film's high body count and violent battle scenes.

The film was theatrically released in China on April 6, 2015.

=== Box office ===
The film grossed $5.1 million in other territories. During its opening weekend in China, Outcast opened in ninth place had three day gross of $1.77 million, and a total including previews of $2.43 million and negatively compared with the superior performance of the similarly themed Dragon Blade.

=== Critical reception ===
On the review aggregator website Rotten Tomatoes, Outcast holds an approval rating of 5% based on 22 reviews, with an average rating of 3.2/10. Metacritic, which uses a weighted average, assigned Outcast a score of 33 out of 100 rating based on 7 critics, indicating "generally unfavorable reviews".

Glenn Kenny of RogerEbert.com centered his review on the performances, primarily that of Nicolas Cage. Of it, he said it marked a career shift from Cage's "entertainingly eccentric phase" into his "genuinely befuddling and perhaps sad phase", and noted his "peculiar (of course)", "near-British accent"; he also criticized Hayden Christensen's performance as "lifeless". Jeanette Catsoulis of The New York Times called the movie a "loony", "wannabe epic rattling with swords and clichés". She chiefly criticized the "barnacle-encrusted plot" as being "dumbed down to the studs", along with the performance of Christensen, while praising photography and "surprisingly classy" battle scenes. Gary Goldstein of the Los Angeles Times had kinder words to say, calling the movie "visually arresting, smartly paced, well-edited", but otherwise "unremarkable". He said the film may best be remembered for Cage's "warrior coif", saying it was "perhaps his most unflattering movie hairdo yet — and that's saying a lot" and that Cage could "pinch-hit for Gene Simmons at a Kiss concert". And Sebastian Zavala, writing for ScreenAnarchy.com, said that the movie "could certainly have been a better vehicle for an unleashed, energetic Cage", but that "what we end up with is a lifeless, slightly-entertaining-yet-ultimately-disappointing action “epic”."

== Sequel ==
On April 15, 2014, producer Jeremy Bolt announced plans for a sequel. Plans for a sequel ultimately went unrealized possibly due to the lackluster Chinese box office.
