= Calico Joe =

2012 novel by John Grisham

- First edition (US)
- Author: John Grisham
- Language: English
- Genre: Sports
- Publisher: Doubleday (US); Hodder & Stoughton (UK)
- Publication date: April 10, 2012 (hardcover); March 26, 2013 (paperback)
- Publication place: United States
- Preceded by: The Litigators
- Followed by: The Racketeer

Calico Joe is John Grisham's first baseball novel. It was released on April 10, 2012.

The book's style mixes fact and fiction - introducing fictional players into well-known actual teams such as the New York Mets and the Chicago Cubs and lets them interact with actual people such as Yogi Berra, while letting dramatic fictional baseball matches take place in actual stadiums.

== Characters ==
- Warren Tracey, 34-year-old pitcher New York Mets pitcher. He abuses alcohol, his wife, and his son. He is also known for hitting opposing batters and has a high enough opinion of himself to believe he was snubbed for the Major League Baseball All-Star Game.
- Paul Tracey, Warren's 11-year-old son. He is a modestly skilled Little League Baseball player and huge baseball fan.
- Joe Castle (known as "Calico Joe"), a promising 21-year-old rookie Chicago Cubs first baseman from Calico Rock, Arkansas who has posted career statistics of 21 home runs in 38 games and a career batting average of .488. He is a man of extreme virtue, who donates his signing bonus to a variety of charities.

== Background ==
The author, John Grisham, once dreamed of a career as a professional baseball player for the St. Louis Cardinals. This, his first baseball novel, is about a beanball that ends the career of a promising player. The novel is inspired by the real-life story of Ray Chapman, the only professional baseball player killed by a pitch. The book was also inspired by some of Grisham's personal baseball experience, as noted in the foreword, when Grisham played baseball and developed a dislike of aggressive, bad-mannered pitchers. For example, at the age of 19, Grisham saw a ball fly by his face at about ninety miles per hour and quit the game, promptly and permanently.

The novel involves a near-fatal pitch thrown on August 24, 1973 and its implications 30 years later on both the batter, "Calico Joe" Castle, and the pitcher, New York Mets player Warren Tracey, as narrated by his son, Paul Tracey.

== Plot ==
Joe Castle starts his career with home runs in his first three Major League Baseball at bats as well as hits in his first 15 plate appearances and is able to keep his batting average over .500 for the first six weeks of his season. In a late-summer visit to Shea Stadium, Castle hits a home run in his first at-bat against Warren. Paul Tracey is a huge fan of Castle's. Castle's career is ended later in the game when Warren intentionally hits him with a pitch. Castle goes into a prolonged coma, suffers a stroke and is incapacitated for life, his ball-playing days definitely over. The Traceys become estranged and Paul does not watch another baseball game for 30 years.

When Warren Tracey is on the verge of death from pancreatic cancer, Paul Tracey decides to try to arrange a meeting between him and Castle, a far from easy task. Paul visits Joe's hometown of Calico Rock, Arkansas, where Joe lives, devotedly tending the town's baseball field and being supported by his two brothers. The sympathetic editor of the local Calico paper tells Paul that Joe hardly ever talks to strangers - much less to Warren Tracey, who destroyed his career. In fact, there is a concrete danger of Warren being physically assaulted, should he appear in Calico Rock - the townspeople still angry at what he did to their hero. Paul travels to Florida to visit with Warren, who has retired there with his fifth wife. Paul finds his long-estranged father as egoistic and vindictive as ever - reiterating, as he did for thirty years, that his hitting Joe Castle was an accident, that he had nothing to apologize for and that he had no interest in meeting Joe.

However, with cancer ravaging his body, Warren eventually has a change of heart. He does travel to Calico Rock, and Joe does consent to meet him. In a moment of sincerity, Warren admits to having deliberately hit Joe out of pure spite and offers an apology, asking, "Do you hate me," to which Joe answers, "No, you have apologized". Warren then says "You are a greater man than me" and the two shake hands.

Having brought about such a startling reconciliation between the old foes, Warren Tracey and Joe Castle, Paul Tracey finds himself unable to reach similar closure with his father - too many memories of abuse blocking his way. When saying goodbye to his dying father, despite knowing he will never see him again, Paul is unable to offer the embrace his father hopes for.

After Warren's death, Joe Castle and his brothers surprisingly turn up at the sparsely-attended funeral in Florida. When Warren's will is opened, it is revealed that he left $25,000 to the town of Calico Rock's baseball field - Joe's last link with the world of baseball.

== Reception ==
=== Book sales ===
Calico Joe debuted at number 1 on the April 29, 2012 The New York Times Best Seller list in the Hardcover Fiction category for the week ending April 14, 2012. The book also debuted atop the Publishers Weekly best-seller list for the week of April 19. Calico Joe only debuted at number 6 on the April 19 USA Today best seller list. It debuted at number 3 on The Wall Street Journal's April 15 Hardcover Fiction Best Seller list.

=== Critical review ===
According to Bob Minzesheimer of Gannett News Service, "In baseball terms, Calico Joe is...like a pleasant, mid-season afternoon at the ballpark, when the home team slowly rallies and wins." In contrast to the typical Grisham novel that is "full of twists and turns and tension", this novel is "a sweet, simple story" according to The Washington Post's Steven V. Roberts. Roberts describes the novel as a fable with a moral that "good can come out of evil; it’s never too late to confess your sins and seek forgiveness." The story is also about relationships, such as the Castle brothers', the Father-son Tracey relationship, and the relationship between Joe and his hometown community. According to Glenn C. Altschuler for The Oregonian, Calico Joe "...is not a great baseball novel. But it, too, uses America's national pastime to search for moral and cultural truths." Altschuler notes that "As a ballplayer and as a person, Joe Castle is too good to be true." On the other hand, he also notes that "Warren Tracey, by contrast, is too bad to be interesting." Altschuler opines that the ending "isn't all that credible".

== Film adaptation ==
Two months after the book was published, it was reported that filmmaker Chris Columbus would direct and produce an adaptation of the novel under his own company 1492 Pictures. Columbus had previously produced an adaptation of Grisham's novel Skipping Christmas, entitled Christmas with the Kranks. After eight years of no further development, it was announced that George Clooney and Grant Heslov had acquired the film rights and would develop and produce an adaptation of the novel under their company Smokehouse Pictures, with Clooney possibly directing.
