= Heaven Is for Real (film) =

- Theatrical release poster
- Directed by: Randall Wallace
- Screenplay by: Randall Wallace; Christopher Parker
- Based on: Heaven Is for Real by Todd Burpo and Lynn Vincent
- Produced by: Joe Roth; T. D. Jakes; DeVon Franklin
- Starring: Greg Kinnear; Kelly Reilly; Connor Corum; Margo Martindale; Thomas Haden Church
- Cinematography: Dean Semler
- Edited by: John Wright
- Music by: Nick Glennie-Smith
- Production companies: TriStar Pictures; Roth Films
- Distributed by: Sony Pictures Releasing
- Release date: April 16, 2014
- Running time: 99 minutes
- Country: United States
- Language: English
- Budget: $12 million
- Box office: $102 million

Heaven Is for Real is a 2014 American Christian drama film written and directed by Randall Wallace and co-written by Christopher Parker, based on the 2010 book Heaven Is for Real by Pastor Todd Burpo and Lynn Vincent. The film stars Greg Kinnear, Kelly Reilly, Connor Corum, Margo Martindale, and Thomas Haden Church. The film has received mixed critical reviews, but it nevertheless was a box office success, grossing $102 million against a $12 million budget, becoming the second-highest grossing Christian film of all time.

== Plot ==
Living in rural Imperial, Nebraska, Todd Burpo is the pastor of Crossroads Wesleyan Church, who works on garage doors on the side as well as coaching wrestling at the local high school. He goes home to find his 4-year-old son, Colton, on the steps, trying to avoid his mother Sonja's weekly church choir group practice inside. They go together for pizza, first passing by a hospital to visit a dying man.

Todd has a few health setbacks, which keep him from his congregation for weeks. The first is a bad broken leg during a baseball match; the second is kidney stones. His family does a road trip to Denver, and on the way back Colton and his sister Cassie start vomiting and he has a fever, but the doctor assumes it is the flu as it has been going around.

As both parents suffered appendicitis, Sonja accurately guesses Colton is suffering from it. They rush to the hospital, where he undergoes emergency surgery for acute appendicitis. As the rupture happened days previously, Colton is not given a good prognosis. His mother asks everyone they know to pray. Finally, he pulls through, then immediately asks to return to touch an animal he had feared before.

Back in Denver to touch the tarantula, Colton tells his incredulous father about having seen the surgeon operating on his ruptured appendix, Sonja calling people in the waiting room to pray, and him in the hospital's chapel yelling at God to not let him die. Then at home, Cassie tells their father that Colton has been speaking oddly, then the boy elaborately describes things he saw in heaven.

The boy also speaks of incidents with people he never met or knew about: meeting a younger version of his great-grandfather who had died long before Colton was born (as Colton says dead people are young again when they are in heaven), an unborn sister he never knew about who had died in a miscarriage, and having met Jesus.

Colton speaks about his experiences in Heaven, and Todd is faced with the dilemma of determining the legitimacy of his son's experience. Todd's wariness about discussing the situation erodes the confidence of the board members of his church, and he is contacted by several members of the media.

When Todd is called by a radio station for an impromptu on-air interview, he invites them to attend his sermon the following Sunday. At church, he preaches about his son's experiences and reveals his support for him.

Following the events at the church, as Todd is doing research on the Internet, he finds a story about a Lithuanian girl who had a similar experience. Her recall of Jesus was similar to that of Colton. Todd tries to speak to Colton further about the experience, but he is interrupted by his wife revealing that she is pregnant with their third child.

Photos of Colton and his family are shown in the present day.

== Cast ==
- Greg Kinnear as Todd Burpo, a small-town pastor in Nebraska
- Connor Corum as Colton Burpo, Todd's son
- Kelly Reilly as Sonja Burpo, Todd's wife
- Lane Styles as Cassie Burpo, Todd's daughter and Colton's sister
- Margo Martindale as Nancy Rawling
- Thomas Haden Church as Jay Wilkins
- Mike Mohrhardt as Jesus
- Ali Tataryn as Angel
- Ina Barron as Angel
- Jacob Vargas as Michael
- Nancy Sorel as Dr. Charlotte Slater
- Danso Gordon as Ray
- Darcy Fehr as Lee Watson
- Kevin Anderson as Mr. Baxter
- Amber Lynn Partridge as The Zookeeper

== Production and development ==
In May 2011, Sony Pictures acquired the film rights of the book Heaven Is for Real. It was announced that Joe Roth would be producing the film with T. D. Jakes for the TriStar Pictures division of Sony Pictures. On August 23, 2012, Braveheart writer and Secretariat director Randall Wallace signed on to direct.

On March 19, 2013, it was announced that Greg Kinnear was in talks to star, and he later joined the cast. On April 15, 2013, actress Kelly Reilly joined the film.

On July 17, it was reported that composer Nick Glennie-Smith would score the film, and behind the scenes, the director of photography was Dean Semler.

Shooting began in the last week of July 2013 in Selkirk, Manitoba.

== Release ==
The film was released on April 16, 2014 and held a 3,048 theater count through its 4th week.

== Home media ==
Heaven Is for Real was released on DVD and Blu-ray on July 22, 2014, by Sony Pictures Home Entertainment. Special features including Colton goes to heaven and Deleted Scenes. The film was released on Double Features on July 12, 2016, alongside Miracles from Heaven. The film was released to stream on Netflix March 31, 2017 in Australia and got removed on April 1, 2025.

== Reception ==
=== Box office ===
At the end of box office run, Heaven Is for Real earned a gross of $91.4 million in North America and $10.5 million in other territories for a worldwide total of $102 million against a budget of $12 million.

The film grossed $3.7 million on its opening day. It went on to gross a total of $22.5 million in its opening weekend, playing in 2,417 theaters for a $9,318 per-theatre average, finishing in second behind Captain America: The Winter Soldier.

The biggest markets in other territories were Mexico, Poland, and Colombia where the film grossed $1.9 million, $1.4 million, and $1.2 million, respectively.

=== Critical response ===
Heaven Is for Real received mixed reviews. The film holds a 52% rating on the film aggregator website Rotten Tomatoes, based on 87 reviews, with an average score of 5.6/10. The site's consensus states, "Heaven Is for Real boasts a well-written screenplay and a talented cast, but overextends itself with heavy-handed sequences depicting concepts it could have trusted the audience to take on faith." On another website, Metacritic, it has a 47/100 score (indicating "mixed or average"), based on reviews from 27 critics.

In CinemaScore polls conducted during the opening weekend, cinema audiences gave the film an average grade of "A" on an A+ to F scale.

Jeb Lund, a columnist for The Guardian, expressed skepticism about the depiction of the story in the film. The red markers which Colton Burpo claims Jesus had on his hands and feet are well known. The boy could have easily guessed that his minister father would have been praying, or nursing staff could have told him.

== Accolades ==
List of awards and nominations
Award	Category	Recipient	Result	Ref(s)
Teen Choice Awards	Choice Movie: Drama	Heaven Is for Real	Nominated	
People's Choice Awards	Favorite Dramatic Movie	Heaven Is for Real	Nominated	
MovieGuide Awards	Best Movie for Families	Heaven Is for Real	Won	

== See also ==
- Akiane
- Miracles from Heaven (film)
- Breakthrough (2019 film)
