= Eben Alexander Jr. =

American academic neurosurgeon

Eben Alexander
- Born: 1913; Knoxville, Tennessee
- Died: 2004 (aged 90–91)
- Occupation: Neurosurgeon
- Medical career
- Field: Neurosurgery
- Sub-specialties: Academic neurosurgery
- Awards: Distinguished Service Award, Medallion of Merit, Hadassah Humanitarian Award

Eben Alexander Jr (1913–2004) was an American academic neurosurgeon and a native of Knoxville, Tennessee. He is known for his notable education and training of neurosurgeons, his many recognition awards, and for his editorship of Surgical Neurology — An International Journal of Neurosurgery and Neuroscience from 1987 to 1994.

== Early life and education ==
Eben was born in Knoxville, Tennessee. His mother was a Canadian graduate nurse, and his father a prominent surgeon. Alexander came from a distinguished family of scholars that spans several generations. His paternal grandfather Eben Alexander was a diplomat, scholar, and a professor of Greek at the University of North Carolina as well as U.S. Minister to Greece 1892-1896. Alexander's adopted son, Eben Alexander III, followed in his father's footsteps as an academic neurosurgeon, and wrote the book, Proof of Heaven: A Neurosurgeon's Journey into the Afterlife (2012).

Alexander studied at the University of North Carolina, earning his A.B. degree at Chapel Hill. He later attended Harvard Medical School and graduated with an M.D. degree cum laude in 1939.

Alexander trained in surgery at the Peter Bent Brigham hospital during 1939-42, joining the U.S. Air Force in 1942. During his military service, Alexander transferred to the ground forces, went overseas to New Guinea, the Philippines, and Japan, and was awarded the Bronze Star for action in Mindanao, the Philippines. Following his service in the Army Medical Corps, he continued his training in Boston at Peter Bent Brigham Hospital, The Children's Hospital, and as a research fellow at Harvard, then at Toronto General Hospital and Yale University School of Medicine, before joining the Wake Forest faculty in 1949.

== Career ==
Alexander joined the academic faculty at Bowman Gray School of Medicine in 1949 and became Professor and Chief of Neurosurgery. He was Chief of Staff of the North Carolina Baptist Hospital from 1953–73 and also Chairman of Wake Forest Baptist Hospital, Department of Neurosurgery, 1953-1973. He retired as Chief of service in 1978, and became Emeritus in 1983. Nevertheless, he remained active in his profession, serving as editor of the prominent journal, Surgical Neurology 1986-1994 and Associate Editor of the North Carolina Medical Journal 1986-2004.

Alexander was the recipient of the Distinguished Service Award from both the American Medical Association (AMA) and the Society of Neurological Surgeons (SNS) in 1989. He was also awarded Wake Forest's highest honor, the University's Medallion of Merit in 1990. He had also received his Local Hadassah Humanitarian Award 1958. He served as president of both The Society of Neurological Surgeons (SNS) and the American Association of Neurological Surgeons (AANS), from which he received the Association's highest award, the Cushing Award for Outstanding Service, in 1984. His contribution to the fields of neurology and neurosurgery include over 200 publications with interests ranging from pediatric neurosurgery to cervical spine (vertebral column) disease, fractures of the spine, brain tumor research and congenital anomalies. He continued to write and publish papers for 15 years after his Emeritus status. In his honor, the medical center established the Eben Alexander Jr., M.D., Chair in Neurosurgery at Wake Forest University School of Medicine.

Alexander was among the early neurosurgeons who explored the use of plastics in neurosurgery. He was engaged in pediatric neurosurgery, contributing to the surgical treatment of congenital conditions.
