= Heaven Is for Real =

Christian non-fiction book

- Author: Todd Burpo and Lynn Vincent
- Language: English
- Publisher: Nelson
- Publication date: November 2, 2010
- Publication place: United States
- Media type: Print (paperback, hardcover), ebook, audiobook
- Pages: 163
- ISBN: 0849946158
- Website: Official website

Heaven is for Real: A Little Boy's Astounding Story of His Trip to Heaven and Back is a 2010 New York Times best-selling Christian biography written by a Methodist pastor, Reverend Todd Burpo from rural Nebraska, and Lynn Vincent and published by Thomas Nelson Publishers. The book documents the near-death experience and the alleged miraculous vision by Burpo's then nearly four-years-old gravely ill son Colton Burpo in 2003, during his appendix surgery, and his alleged visit to heaven.

By April 2012, more than one million ebooks had been sold, and more than 10 million copies had been sold by 2014. A feature film based on the book was released on April 16, 2014, earning $101 million at the box office.

== Summary ==
In the year 2002, Methodist pastor, Reverend Todd Burpo, lived with his wife Sonja and their two children in a shanty town in rural Nebraska. Their two children were a daughter named Cassie (born in 1996) and a son named Colton (born in 1999). Reverend Todd Burpo and his family were poor and he often struggled to make ends meet for his family, despite working both as a pastor and as a store clerk along with picking up various odd jobs. One day, Todd Burpo's three-year-old son Colton fell gravely ill and began violently vomiting. Todd and Sonja Burpo took their son Colton to an emergency room, but the doctor diagnosed Colton with flu and he said that it would eventually pass. Colton continued to vomit daily for several weeks. Todd and Sonja continued taking their son to the emergency room, but they continued to be told Colton just had a flu. When the vomiting did not stop and the illness got much worse, Todd and Sonja suspected that Colton did not just have a simple flu but that he may have appendicitis, and they took Colton to a different hospital after he became unconscious. In the hospital, the doctors confirmed to Todd and Sonja that their son Colton indeed had appendicitis and that he was dying. Colton needed to have a surgery on his appendix immediately, or he would most likely die soon. Colton was given the surgery, and he recovered back to health shortly afterwards.

Several months after the surgery on his appendix, three-year-old Colton began telling his father Todd Burpo about how he had left his body during his surgery, and went to heaven. Colton said that when he was in heaven, he met Jesus Christ riding a rainbow-colored horse, and that he sat in Jesus' lap while angels sang to him. At first, Todd and Sonja Burpo dismissed their son's story as just his wild imagination, but Colton Burpo insisted his experience was real. He began telling his parents about events or people that were impossible for him to know about. Despite never being told any of this information, Colton told his parents that the doctor who performed the surgery on him was O'Holleran, that his mother had a miscarriage before he was born, that the unborn baby had been a girl, and that he had a great-grandfather named Pop who died 30 years before he was born. Colton also described meeting his great-grandfather Pop while he was in heaven. When his parents asked him how he knew about these facts, Colton said these were revealed to him while he was in heaven.

After revealing those facts to his family, Todd began pressing his son for more information about relatives and events from the past, and began demanding his son to talk about these events and people that he saw in heaven. Eventually, convinced that his son was telling the truth, Todd began talking about his three-year-old son Colton's experience and vision of being in heaven and meeting Jesus Christ, the angels, and his deceased great-grandfather Pop, to his congregation during sermons at his church every Sunday. However, Todd was harshly criticized by his congregation and was accused of lying about his son's story of going to heaven and meeting Jesus Christ to profit off his three-year-old son's illness and surgery for his own personal gain. As a result, he began to lose parishioners; few of his parishioners believed his son's experience as true and continued attending his church on Sundays. After losing many parishioners, Todd and his family became even poorer and faced regular hardships from time to time; as a result of their poverty, Todd's wife Sonja even briefly fell into a state of depression. During this time, Todd began questioning about God and his son's experience. He began complaining to God of why He made him and his family suffer. Eventually, after focusing on his work as a store clerk and working various odd jobs, Todd managed to raise his family's income. Todd's wife Sonja became pregnant, and on 14 October 2004, Todd and Sonja had another son, Colby Burpo. Eventually, Todd and his family left their town in rural Nebraska and moved to Denver, Colorado. Todd kept quiet about his son's experience and vision for several years, for fear that people would not believe him and accuse of him lying for his own personal gain, like many of the parishioners at his church. Eventually, Todd decided to write and publish a book about his son's experience and miraculous vision of being in heaven and meeting Jesus Christ in 2010.

== Response ==
=== Sales ===
Within ten weeks of its November 2010 release, the book debuted at No. 3 on the New York Times bestseller list; by January 2011 there were 200,000 copies in print; and it reached No. 1 in the Times's best-selling non-fiction paperback category in March 2011, remaining in the top 10 for some weeks.

=== Criticism ===
A variety of Christians have expressed questions regarding the book. The Berean Call, a Christian ministry and newsletter, cited the book for its "extra-biblical" and "problematic" claims, as well as the lack of any medical evidence that the boy was clinically dead during the surgery. Author and pastor John MacArthur has criticized the book for presenting an un-Biblical perspective on the afterlife. In an interview with The New Yorker, Heaven Is for Real co-author Lynn Vincent expressed concern that Christians would find the book to be a "hoax" if she included people in heaven having wings.

In 2014, Christian writer Hank Hanegraaff expressed doubt, listing ten reasons in his "Ask Hank" column in the Christian Research Journal published by the Christian Research Institute. Some of Hanegraaff's reasons include that people reporting near-death experiences generally relate stories that "are wildly divergent and mutually contradictory," and that the Burpo family appears to be biased by their simplistic belief in hyperliteralism.

In 2015, Alex Malarkey — a boy with a similar story to Colton Burpo's — publicly recanted his own story and book The Boy Who Came Back from Heaven, stating that his near-death experience described in that book was fictional, and condemned Christian publishers and bookstores for selling popular "heaven tourism" books, which he said "profit from lies." Following Malarkey's statement, Colton Burpo said that while he acknowledged that some among the public had doubts about his account, he stood by Heaven Is for Real's contents nonetheless.

== Awards ==
In less than one year, Heaven Is for Real surpassed the 1 million sales mark and was awarded the Platinum Sales Award by the Evangelical Christian Publishers Association. In 2014, after selling 10 million copies, the book was then awarded the Diamond Sales Award.

== Film adaptation ==
In May 2011, Sony Pictures acquired the film rights of the book. The film was released on April 16, 2014, starring Connor Corum, Margo Martindale, Greg Kinnear, Kelly Reilly, Thomas Haden Church, and Jacob Vargas. As of February 2024, Rotten Tomatoes rated it at 51%. Critics praised the script and cast, but they were critical of heavy-handed exposition.

== In other media ==
The story of Burpo and his alleged experience is briefly referenced towards the end of the Stephen King horror novel Revival.

== See also ==
- 23 Minutes in Hell
- 90 Minutes in Heaven
- Miracles from Heaven
- Proof of Heaven
- The Boy Who Came Back from Heaven
- Howard Storm (author)
