= Akiane =

American painter and poet

Akiane Kramarik
- Born: July 9, 1994 (age 32); Mount Morris, Illinois, U.S.
- Occupations: Painter, poet

YouTube information
- Channel: Akiane Kramarik
- Genre: Art
- Subscribers: 408K
- Last updated: 30 September 2024
- Website: akiane.com

Akiane Kramarik (/əˈkiːənə/; born July 9, 1994) is an American poet and painter. She began drawing at the age of four. Kramarik's best-known painting is Prince of Peace, which she completed at the age of eight.

== Early life ==
Akiane Kramarik was born on July 9, 1994, in Mount Morris, Illinois, to a Lithuanian mother and a non-practicing Catholic American father. Kramarik professed she saw the face of Jesus Christ in her visions. Her education began at a parochial school, but she was later homeschooled. Regarding her influences and motivation, she states:

Religious art of sculptures, reliefs and paintings in one of the parochial schools I attended greatly influenced my later attraction to legendary figures. For the first time I got to encounter the world's view of what divinity was supposed to be, but deep down I felt that I perceived everything in a much broader and deeper sense. It appeared to me as if most people were completely ignorant of other realities, or that the realities they perceived were seen only from a very narrow angle.

== Paintings ==
Kramarik is a self-taught painter and says that Jesus spoke to her when she was four years old, encouraging her to draw and paint her visions. She began to draw at the age of four, was painting at six, and began to write poetry at seven. At the age of eight years old, Akiane painted Jesus. Her first completed self-portrait sold for US$10,000.

Kramarik's paintings are often allegorical as well as spiritual, involving likenesses of Jesus, children, and animals, as well as self-portraits. She often draws inspiration from magazine pictures. However, according to Kramarik, her main inspiration comes from her visions of Heaven and her religious experiences. By age 12, she had completed sixty large paintings. Some of her works have been purchased by the US Embassy in Singapore.

At the age of nine, Kramarik appeared on The Oprah Winfrey Show. At the age of 12, she appeared on CNN. She appeared in the 68th episode of The Late Late Show with Craig Ferguson in 2005 and the 21st episode of Katie in 2012.

== Prince of Peace ==
Kramarik has said Prince of Peace is her "favorite portrait" and one of her most memorable paintings. At age eight she had long been seeking the right face to help her paint an image from her dreams and visions when a family friend brought to her a carpenter as a possible subject. The man's face closely resembled what Kramarik remembered as the face of Jesus. She completed the portrait in 40 hours of intensive work. Not long after, it was shipped to her agent for exhibition, who then stole it and sold it without permission. For sixteen years the original painting was held locked in a bank vault, with the then-owner unwilling either to show or to sell it. In December 2019, Prince of Peace was recovered by the artist's family and sold to a private collector for $850,000.

== Bibliography ==
- Akiane: Her Life, Her Art, Her Poetry, W Publishing Group 2006 ISBN 0-8499-0044-1
- Akiane: My Dream is Bigger Than I: Memories of Tomorrow Artakiane.llc 2006 ISBN 0-9778697-0-9
