= Cecil Murphey =

American writer (born 1933)

Cecil "Cec" Murphey (born January 28, 1933) is an American writer, whose books are in categories such as nonfiction, biography, caregiving, memoir, fiction, and inspirational. He has best sellers to his credit, most notably 90 Minutes in Heaven, a collaboration with Don Piper, and Gifted Hands: The Ben Carson Story a collaboration with Dr. Ben Carson. Murphey has also written books with other celebrities, such as football player Shaun Alexander, Franklin Graham and Bishop Eddie Long. Murphey is also a public speaker on such topics as Christianity, faith, male sexual abuse, caregiving, and writing.

== Personal life ==
Murphey was born in Hobart, Oklahoma and grew up in Davenport, Iowa. After graduating from Davenport High School in 1951, he enlisted in the U.S. Navy from 1951 to 1955. In 1954, reading Magnificent Obsession by Lloyd C. Douglas began his conversion process; he became an active church member of Immanuel Baptist Church in Waukegan, Illinois, where he met his future wife, Shirley Brackett, whom he married in 1955.

After his discharge from the Navy, he did his undergraduate work in the Chicago area, receiving his Bachelor of Religious Education from Chicago Bible College and his BA in Education from Pestalozzi-Froebel Teachers College, while teaching sixth grade in the public schools of Waukegan.

In 1961, the Murpheys and their three children left for Kenya to do missionary service. They returned to the United States in 1967, and Murphey entered Columbia Theological Seminary in Decatur, Georgia and Atlanta University – now Clark Atlanta – studying at both simultaneously. In 1970 he graduated from both, receiving his MA in Education from Atlanta and his Master of Divinity from Columbia. That same year, he was ordained by the Presbyterian Church. From 1970 to 1972 he was a Ph.D. student at Emory University. In 1973, he began to teach part-time at Beulah Heights Bible College – now Beulah Heights University – where he taught, intermittently, for the next 25 years.

== Writing career ==
Murphey began writing articles in 1971, while a pastor in Atlanta. His first book, Prayer: Pitfalls and Possibilities was released in 1974. In 1976, Murphey taught at his first writers' conference for Dixie Council of Authors in St. Simons, Georgia. Since then, he has taught at approximately 250 writers' conferences, most notably with the American Christian Writers. In 1984, Murphey left the pastorate to become a full-time writer.

90 Minutes in Heaven: A True Story of Death and Life has sold more than 5 million copies, been printed in 26 languages, and appeared on the New York Times paperback bestseller list for 26 weeks. Since the initial publication of 90 Minutes in Heaven, three follow-up books have been released: Daily Devotions Inspired by 90 Minutes in Heaven and Heaven Is Real, also on the New York Times bestseller list, and Getting to Heaven: Departing Instructions for Your Life Now.

== Film adaptations ==
Gifted Hands was adapted for film, with Cuba Gooding Jr. as Dr. Ben Carson, and aired on TNT in 2009.

== Awards and honors ==
- 2009: Extraordinary Service Award from the American Society of Journalists and Authors
- 2009: 90 Minutes in Heaven won a Christian Retailing Retailers Choice Award in the "Backlist" category
- 2007: Lifetime Achievement Award from the Advanced Writers and Speakers Association (AWSA)
- 2005: I Choose to Stay (with Salome Thomas-EL) was selected to receive the BlackBoard Book of the Year Award for nonfiction from African American booksellers
