= Missouri Medicine =

Medical Journal

- Discipline: Medicine
- Language: English
- Edited by: John C. Hagan, III

Publication details
- History: 1904-present
- Publisher: Missouri State Medical Association
- Frequency: Bimonthly
- Open access: Yes

Standard abbreviations
- ISO 4: Mo. Med.

Indexing
- CODEN: MIMIA2
- ISSN: 0026-6620
- LCCN: 44049521
- OCLC no.: 795743642

Links
- Journal homepage; Online archive

Missouri Medicine is a bimonthly peer-reviewed medical journal that was established in 1904 and is published by the Missouri State Medical Association.

== Abstracting and indexing ==
Additional information needed

The journal is abstracted and indexed in Scopus and Index Medicus/MEDLINE/PubMed.

== Editorship and history ==
The journal was established in 1904. Former editors-in-chief include Jordan W. Burkey (1982-1988), Donald G. Sessions (1988-1992), and J. Regan Thomas (1992-2000). The current editor is John C. Hagan, III.
