= Lynn Vincent =

American journalist (born 1962)

- Born: 1962 (age 63–64); Springfield, Massachusetts, US
- Occupations: Author, journalist
- Spouse: Danny R. Vincent
- Children: 2

Lynn Vincent (born 1962) is an American writer, journalist, and author or co-author of 12 books. Vincent's work focuses on memoirs, history, and narrative nonfiction. From 2022-2025, she served as the executive editor of World magazine.

Her 2018 book Indianapolis: The True Story of the Worst Sea Disaster in U.S. Navy History and the Fifty-Year Fight to Exonerate an Innocent Man debuted at #5 on The New York Times Best Seller List. Indianapolis was chosen by Amazon editors as the Best History Book of 2018 and the #3 best book of the year overall. The book was also selected as one of the best of 2018 by Barnes & Noble, Kirkus Reviews and NPR.

In 2010, Vincent wrote, with Todd Burpo, Heaven Is for Real, the story of the four-year-old son of a Nebraska pastor who had a near-death experience during emergency surgery and claimed to have visited heaven. The book spent more than 200 consecutive weeks on The New York Times Best Seller list, with 77 weeks at #1. In 2014, the book became a motion picture directed by Randall Wallace.

Vincent co-wrote Sarah Palin's 2009 memoir, Going Rogue: An American Life.

In 2006, Vincent collaborated with Ron Hall and Denver Moore on Same Kind of Different as Me, the story of a homeless black man and a wealthy white art dealer who rescue each other during difficult circumstances. The book spent three years on The New York Times Best Seller list with more than 1 million copies sold, reaching #1 in October 2017 when Paramount Pictures released a film adaptation directed by Michael Carney and starring Greg Kinnear and Renée Zellweger.

Vincent, a U.S. Navy veteran, spent 11 years as an investigative reporter and feature writer for World magazine, a Christian newsweekly. She has lectured on writing at the World Journalism Institute, and at The King's College in New York City.

== Background ==
Vincent was born in Springfield, Massachusetts and lives in San Diego, California.
