= Paterno (book) =

2012 book by Joe Posnanski

- Author: Joe Posnanski
- Language: English
- Subject: Biography of late former Penn State Nittany Lions football coach Joe Paterno
- Genre: Non-fiction
- Publisher: Simon & Schuster
- Publication date: August 21, 2012
- Pages: 416
- ISBN: 978-1451657494

Paterno is a 2012 biography of the Penn State football coach Joe Paterno book by sportswriter Joe Posnanski. The Paterno family granted Posnanski a great deal of access during the writing process, which included the time period of the Penn State child sex abuse scandal and Paterno's firing. The book debuted at #1 on The New York Times Best Seller list for hardcover non-fiction best-seller.
