= The Racketeer (novel) =

John Grisham novel

- First edition (US)
- Author: John Grisham
- Language: English
- Genre: Legal thriller
- Publisher: Doubleday (US); Hodder & Stoughton (UK)
- Publication date: October 23, 2012
- Publication place: United States
- Preceded by: Calico Joe
- Followed by: Sycamore Row

The Racketeer is a legal thriller novel written by John Grisham that was released on October 23, 2012 by Doubleday with an initial printing of 1.5 million copies. It was one of the best selling books of 2012 and spent several weeks atop various best seller lists.

== Plot ==
Malcolm Bannister is an African American attorney in a small-town Virginia law firm. A real estate transaction which he undertook in good faith turns out to have involved the purchase of a secluded hunting lodge where a Washington lobbyist invited corrupt congressmen for debaucherous orgies with underage girls. After being caught up in a large FBI sweep, Bannister is convicted of racketeering despite his protestations of innocence. The story begins with Bannister halfway through his ten-year prison term; he has since been disbarred, divorced by his wife, lost contact with his son and is nursing a bitter grudge against the FBI.

After hearing of the brutal murders of federal judge Raymond Fawcett and his mistress, Bannister makes a deal with the FBI to give them the name of the killer, in exchange for his release and being put into the Witness Protection Program, supposedly to protect himself from the killer's associates. He informs them that Quinn Rucker, a drug dealer he met in prison, had vowed to escape and murder Fawcett as revenge for a failed bribery attempt in which the judge took $500,000 but didn't follow through on his end of the deal. Acting on information from Bannister, the FBI arrest Quinn and, despite having no evidence against him, manipulate him into confessing to the murder using legal interrogation tactics. Following the indictment, Quinn claims to have been unlawfully coerced into the confession.

Bannister is released and given a new face and identity: Max Reed Baldwin. After the FBI discovers that Rucker's gang knows Bannister's whereabouts and is seeking revenge, he leaves the program and goes off the radar. He sets up a fake film company and meets another man he met in prison, Nathan Cooley, who doesn't recognize him. Bannister convinces Cooley to take part in the filming of a documentary about corruption in the FBI and the DEA. He rents a private plane, ostensibly to fly the two to Florida, but drugs Cooley during the flight and has the plane fly to Jamaica, framing him for drug smuggling and gun running in the process. As the only white inmate in a jail where all other prisoners and the guards are black, Cooley finds himself the subject of vicious bullying.

Bannister tells Cooley that it was Jamaican officials who framed him and are demanding $500,000 for his release. Cooley tells Bannister of a secret stash of gold worth $8.5 million hidden in his backyard, which Bannister arranges for Vanessa, his lover and accomplice, to steal, before he returns to the United States. After the two hide the gold in a series of safety deposit boxes, Vanessa - in reality Quinn's sister - reveals to Quinn's lawyer that her brother has an alibi for Fawcett's murder. The FBI, after receiving an email about the gold from Bannister, realize that he and Quinn have been working together; Quinn's arrest and indictment was all part of a plan to enable Bannister to leave prison and take the gold from Fawcett's killer before clearing Quinn's name.

In exchange for immunity for both himself and Quinn, Bannister reveals to the FBI that Cooley is Fawcett's real killer. Before he was imprisoned, Cooley discovered the gold - which Fawcett had taken from a mining company in exchange for a favorable ruling giving them permission to mine uranium - and told Bannister about his plans to steal it while in prison in an attempt to convince the attorney to get him an early release. Bannister promises to send a bar of gold with Cooley's fingerprints to the FBI as proof of his guilt, while also anticipating that Cooley will make a full confession in order to get out of Jamaica. Bannister warns the FBI to investigate the bribery that took place between Fawcett and the mining company, or he will give the story to the press. The novel ends with Bannister, Vanessa, Quinn - revealed to be Bannister's best friend - and Quinn's brother Dee Ray celebrating in Antigua with all the gold.

== Background ==
Commentators have noted that The Racketeer is unique among Grisham novels in that the main protagonist, Malcolm Bannister, is African-American. Grisham has stated that this came about after many years of fans encouraging him to feature a black hero but according to him, "It's no big deal. It's not about race."

== Reception ==
=== Sales ===
According to Amazon.com the book was the number eight overall best seller of 2012.

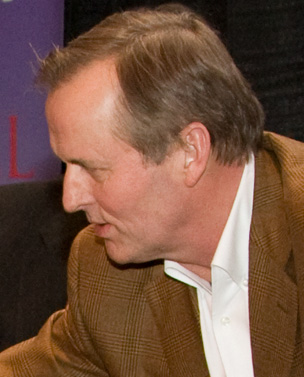
John Grisham

The book debuted at number one on The New York Times Best Seller list on the November 11, 2012 list (reflecting sales for the week ending October 27, 2012), where it remained for three weeks ending with the November 25 list (reflecting sales for the week ending November 10, 2012). On December 2, it was surpassed by Vince Flynn's The Last Man. However, on the December 30 list (reflecting sales for the week ending December 15, 2012), it regained the top position, which it also held the following week. As of 18 February 2013 the book remained on the best seller list for the week ending February 24 (reflecting sales for the week ending February 9, 2013).

The book reached the top of the USA Today best seller list for the week of November 1 and remained atop the list the following week. It is Grisham's 18th book to reach number one on the USA Today list.

The book debuted at #1 on The Wall Street Journal Hardcover Fiction bestseller list on for the week ending October 28, 2012 in the edition of November 3. It remained at #1 for three weeks. It debuted at #1 on The Wall Street Journal Fiction E-Books and Fiction Combined bestseller lists on for the week ending November 4, 2012 in the edition of November 9, but fell to #2 the following week. By December 2, it had fallen to #5 on the Fiction E-Books list, and it fell out of the top ten for the first time the following week. It remained in the Fiction Combined top ten until the December 30 list in the edition of January 4, 2013. It remained in the Hardcover Fiction top 10 until the January 27 list in the edition of February 1.

=== Critical review ===
Tom Nolan of The Wall Street Journal describes the book as an enigmatic puzzle to understand who the title character is: Bannister, murdered Judge Raymond Fawcett, or his killer. Nolan also views the book as insightful in its descriptions of the legal and penal system. He also lauds the book for its plot twists and scenery changes. Janet Maslin of The New York Times described the book as a departure from Grisham's normal legal novels. Although it began with the normal legal trouble, it then winds its way along an unexpected course. She says that rather than pursue the usual "triumph or a miscarriage of courtroom justice", this book is about reformation and revenge. The USA Today lauded the book's interesting twists when it named it as a recommended book on October 27.

== Film adaptation ==
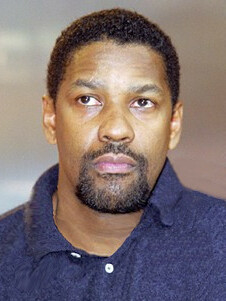
Denzel Washington was initially mentioned as the possible star of a screen adaptation.

According to The Hollywood Reporter, Fox 2000 and New Regency agreed in February 2013 to develop a film adaptation of The Racketeer. They signed on director Daniel Espinosa, who previously directed Safe House, which starred Denzel Washington and Ryan Reynolds. When the book was first released in October 2012, Washington was mentioned as a possibility to play the lead role of Malcolm Bannister in a film adaptation. Grisham hoped that Washington would play the role and many of his contacts encouraged him to pursue Denzel saying, he has "got to get Denzel!". However, on the potential of Washington being involved, Grisham commented "nobody has heard from Denzel. And I learned a long time ago, you never get the one you want. You can never get the right actor." There has, however, been no further development on the film since the initial report.
