= Proof of Heaven =

2012 nonfiction book by Eben Alexander

Proof of Heaven: A Neurosurgeon's Journey into the Afterlife
- Author: Eben Alexander
- Language: English
- Subject: Spirituality
- Publisher: Simon & Schuster
- Publication date: October 23, 2012
- Publication place: United States
- Media type: Print (hardcover and paperback)
- Pages: 196
- ISBN: 978-1451695199
- Followed by: The Map of Heaven

Proof of Heaven: A Neurosurgeon's Journey into the Afterlife is a 2012 New York Times bestselling nonfiction book and autobiographical book written by the American neurosurgeon Eben Alexander and published by Simon & Schuster. The book describes a near-death experience Alexander had while suffering from what should have been a fatal case of acute, gram-negative Escherichia coli bacterial meningitis, while on a ventilator and in a near death coma for one full week, with death imminently predicted by his medical experts. Alexander describes how the experience changed his perceptions of life and the afterlife. The book was a commercial success but also was the subject of scientific criticism in relation to misconceptions about neurology, like relating to medically induced coma as brain death.

== Summary ==
In the fall of 2008, Alexander, a doctor at Lynchburg General Hospital in Virginia, contracted a very rare bacterial meningitis and spent seven days in a coma. During this state, Alexander's experiences gave him reason to believe in consciousness after documented neocortex brain death. Alexander relates the details of his experience from the point of view of a neurosurgeon and discusses how this has affected his views on life, philosophy, medicine, and (as a lifetime agnostic) the existence of God and angels.

== Reception ==
Proof of Heaven reached the top 10 list in USA Today's 150 top selling titles. It has also reached number 1 on New York Times' best selling paperback nonfiction books, number 3 on Los Angeles Times best sellers, and is included on Amazon Best Sellers of 2012. Proof of Heaven was featured in Newsweek and Alexander's story was presented on ABC news Nightline. Some scepticism and criticism has been received, as well as praise.

In a 2013 investigation of Alexander's story and medical background, Esquire magazine reported that before the publication of Proof of Heaven, Alexander had been terminated or suspended from multiple hospital positions, and had been the subject of several malpractice lawsuits, including at least two involving the alteration of medical records to cover up a medical error. He settled five malpractice suits in Virginia within a period of ten years. Esquire also found what it said were discrepancies with regard to Alexander's version of events in the book. Among the discrepancies, was that Alexander had written the cause of his coma was bacterial meningitis, despite his doctor telling the reporter that he had been conscious and hallucinating before being placed in a medically induced coma. In a statement responding to the criticism, Alexander maintained that his representation of the experience was truthful and that he believed in the message contained in his book. He also claimed that the Esquire article "cherry-picked" information about his past to discredit his accounts of the event.

Proof of Heaven was also criticized by scientists, including by neuroscientist Sam Harris, who described Alexander's NDE account on his blog as "alarmingly unscientific", and that claims of experiencing visions while his cerebral cortex was shut down demonstrated a failure to acknowledge existing brain science. He noted that DMT, a neurotransmitter of the brain, as well as ketamine, an anesthesic commonly used in the management of neurological conditions, are common and more plausible means of such strong hallucinatory experiences. He added that while neurosurgeons need to understand its anatomy, they do not need to study how the brain functions, unlike neurologists. Neurologist and writer Oliver Sacks agreed with Harris, and argued that Alexander had failed to recognize that the experience could have been the result of his cortex returning to full function at the outset of his coma, rather than a supernatural experience.
