= Howard Storm (author) =

American Christian minister and writer (born 1946)

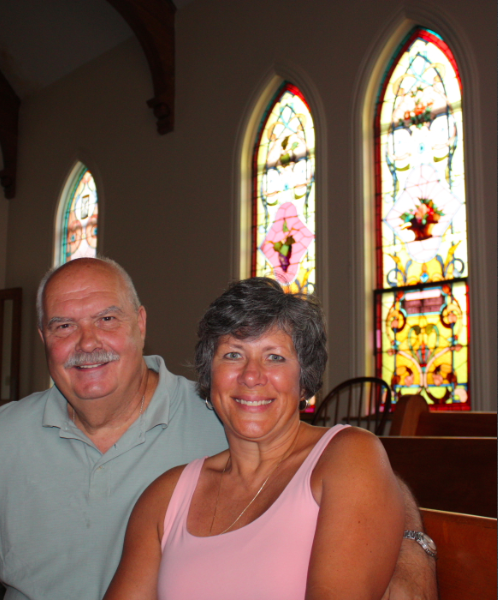
- Born: Howard Storm; October 26, 1946 (age 79); Newton, Massachusetts, U.S.
- Education: San Francisco Art Institute,(BFA); University of California, Berkeley (MA, MFA); United Theological Seminary,(MDiv)
- Church: United Church of Christ
- Congregations served: Covington United Church of Christ, Covington, Ohio
- Title: Senior Pastor, Covington United Church of Christ
- Website: http://www.howardstorm.com/

Howard Storm (born October 26, 1946) is an American Christian minister, writer, and painter. He is a former professor and chairman of the art department at Northern Kentucky University. In 2000, he authored My Descent Into Death, which chronicles his near-death experience. Storm's near-death experience has been cited in literature on near-death studies, and his book has garnered endorsement by gothic fiction writer Anne Rice before it was acquired by Doubleday and republished in 2005. Storm has retold his story on NBC's Today Show, The Oprah Winfrey Show, 48 Hours, Discovery Channel and Coast to Coast AM.

== Biography ==
=== Early life ===
Howard Storm was born in Newton, Massachusetts. He received his Bachelor of Fine Arts (BFA) from the San Francisco Art Institute in 1969 and continued his studies at the University of California at Berkeley with a Master of Arts (MA) and Master of Fine Arts (MFA) in 1970. In 1972, Storm moved to Northern Kentucky University in Highland Heights, Kentucky, becoming an arts professor at a newly created department, rapidly achieving tenure, a position he held for 20 years. During an interview with Unsolved Mysteries in 1997, he reported of his life prior to his near-death experience that he was an atheist and an aggressive person, feared by his wife and children.

=== Near-death experience ===
In June 1985, Storm took a group of his students on a field trip to Europe. After returning to his Paris hotel room with his wife around 11:00 a.m. from a morning excursion, he had a sudden onset of severe abdominal pain. He was evaluated at a Paris hospital, Hôpital Cochin, and diagnosed with a duodenal perforation, which required surgery. The earliest a surgeon could perform this procedure was around 9:00 p.m. that day. As he lay waiting for surgery, he truly believed that he was going to die due to the severity of his pain, and he mentally prepared himself for death. After saying goodbye to his wife, he eventually lost consciousness.

Storm reports the following experience: He opened his eyes and found himself standing outside of his body, looking down at the hospital bed with his wife crying beside him. He was without pain, yet hypersensitive to his surroundings. His wife could not see or hear him. He was then drawn by voices calling his name outside the hospital room, and he followed them, believing they were taking him to a doctor. He describes pale humanoid creatures that urged him down the hallway, saying they had been waiting for him. The creatures became increasingly hostile, and when he refused to continue following them, they began to attack him. He then heard a voice saying, “Pray to God,” and so he recited fragments of Bible verses and the Pledge of Allegiance. With the mention of the word “God,” the creatures would retreat, and eventually, he was alone again. After a period of time, he called out to Jesus to save him, and was suddenly rescued by “spiritual beings of light.”

Thereafter, he had a recollection of his entire life, a life review, which highlighted some negative aspects of his life, before the “beings of light” answered his questions. They told him that the United States was a “blessed nation” but one that required change lest it lose its prosperity. He describes visions of a future plagued by war, natural disasters, and despair, but which could be avoided should there be a major spiritual “shift” in the consciousness of the world. These beings told him that the “correct religion” is that religion which “brings you closest to God.” Howard Storm also asked other questions, which he wrote about in his book. Like other near-death experiencers, he claims that we are on earth to love one another.

When he awoke, he was being prepped for surgery, which repaired the duodenal perforation. In the following days, he reports that he was visited by a doctor upon whose arrival the room lightened, and upon his exit, it darkened again. The nurse (whose desk was just outside Storm’s room) had seen nothing. Storm also recounts “a Voice” that told him to ignore the advice of doctors and buy return tickets to the U.S. a week after his procedure, which he did. Upon his arrival in Cincinnati, he was admitted to the hospital in critical condition with double pneumonia, collapsed lung, extreme peritonitis, and non-A non-B hepatitis. His recovery took five weeks, and he reported a period of seven months of extreme weakness before he was able to return to work.

=== Aftermath ===
Storm stated that over time, the experience never faded as memories and dreams do. He became involved with a church, studied for a Master of Divinity from the United Theological Seminary, entered the seminary, and was ordained. He served as pastor of the Zion United Church of Christ in Norwood, Ohio, from 1992 to 2005, and he was also a former pastor of the United Church of Christ in Covington, Ohio.
