= Eben Alexander (author) =

American neurosurgeon (born 1953)

Eben Alexander III
- Born: December 11, 1953 (age 72); Charlotte, North Carolina, US
- Education: University of North Carolina at Chapel Hill (A.B., 1975); Duke University School of Medicine (M.D., 1980)
- Occupations: Writer, neurosurgeon
- Website: www.ebenalexander.com

Eben Alexander III (born December 11, 1953) is an American neurosurgeon and author. In 2008, he went under a medically-induced coma while being treated for meningitis. His book Proof of Heaven: A Neurosurgeon's Journey into the Afterlife (2012) describes his near-death experience while in the coma. He asserts that the coma resulted in brain death, that consciousness is not only a product of the brain and that it can go on to an afterlife.

== Early life and education ==
Alexander was born in Charlotte, North Carolina. He was adopted by Eben Alexander Jr and his wife Elizabeth West Alexander and raised in Winston-Salem, North Carolina, with three siblings. He attended Phillips Exeter Academy, University of North Carolina at Chapel Hill (A.B., 1975), and the Duke University School of Medicine (M.D., 1980).

== Medical career ==
Alexander has taught and had appointments at Duke University Medical Center, Brigham and Women's Hospital, University of Massachusetts Medical School, University of Virginia School of Medicine, Boston Children's Hospital, Dana–Farber Cancer Institute, Harvard Medical School et al.

Alexander left Harvard in 2001, citing frustration with "medical politics". In 2006, he relocated to Lynchburg, Virginia, where he conducted research on less invasive brain surgery techniques using focused X-rays and digital scanners.

While practicing medicine at the Lynchburg General Hospital, Alexander was reprimanded by the Virginia Board of Medicine for performing surgery incorrectly. In 2007, twice within a month, he operated on the wrong segment of patients’ spinal column. In one of the cases, Alexander did not initially reveal his mistake as he believed the surgery had been beneficial; even though it wasn't the intended operation. He was sued by the patient for damages totalling $3 million in August 2008. The case was dismissed by the plaintiff in 2009 without comment from an attorney. Due to these mistakes, Alexander temporarily lost his privileges at the hospital and was forced to pay a $3,500 fine to the Virginia Board of Medicine. Alexander completed ethics and professionalism training to maintain an unrestricted medical license in the state.

By 2008, Alexander was clinical director of the Brain Program at the Focused Ultrasound Foundation in Charlottesville.

== Near-death experience ==
In November 2008, Alexander was suffering from bacterial meningitis inflaming his brain and spinal cord. He was flailing and in seizure, therefore the doctors put him into a medically-induced coma for his own safety.

== Writing career ==
=== Proof of Heaven ===
Alexander authored Proof of Heaven: A Neurosurgeon's Journey into the Afterlife in 2012. The book expounds on his near-death experience while suffering from a bacterial meningitis and under a medically induced coma. Alexander describes how the experience changed his perceptions of life and the afterlife.

The book was a commercial success but also was the subject of scientific criticism in relation to misconceptions about neurology, such as conflating medically induced coma with brain death. A 2013 article in Esquire magazine refuted claims made in the book. The doctor who treated Alexander stated that certain details cannot be true, such as claims Alexander made about speaking clearly at times he would have been intubated. The Esquire article also reported that Alexander had been terminated or suspended from multiple hospital positions, and had been the subject of several malpractice lawsuits and that he settled five malpractice suits in Virginia within a period of ten years.

Among the discrepancies, was that Alexander had written that the cause of his coma was bacterial meningitis, despite his doctor telling the reporter that he had been conscious and hallucinating before being placed in a medically induced coma. In a statement responding to the criticism, Alexander maintained that his representation of the experience was truthful and that he believed in the message contained in his book. He also claimed that the Esquire article "cherry-picked" information about his past to discredit his accounts of the event.

Proof of Heaven was also criticized by scientists, including Sam Harris, who described Alexander's NDE account on his blog as "alarmingly unscientific", and said that claims of experiencing visions while his cerebral cortex was shut down demonstrated a failure to acknowledge existing brain science with little evidence to prove otherwise. Neurologist and writer Oliver Sacks agreed with Harris, and argued that Alexander had failed to recognize that the experience could have been the result of his cortex returning to full function at the outset of his coma, rather than a supernatural experience. In 2012 Alexander responded to critics in a second Newsweek article, where he said that he vividly remembers having periods of hallucination and explains that there was a massive difference between them and his 'fully immersive' visions of the afterlife. Alexander describes the hallucinations in his book, saying that they were disjointed and centred around both random events and his doctors. He then compares them to the "hyper-real" experience of the afterlife, and says they do not match up. He also made a prediction in his book that secular critics, which included himself before his coma, would attempt to discredit him and his experience without looking into it properly.

Alexander presented related lectures around the world in churches, hospitals, medical schools, and academic symposia, besides appearing on TV shows including Super Soul Sunday with Oprah Winfrey. Alexander has also expanded on his NDE in the Congress of Neurological Surgeons and the peer-reviewed Journal of the Missouri State Medical Association. Proof of Heaven was included on The New York Times Best Seller list for 97 weeks.

=== The Map of Heaven ===
Alexander's second book, The Map of Heaven: How Science, Religion, and Ordinary People Are Proving the Afterlife, was published in October 2014, where he again asserted the existence of an afterlife and that consciousness is independent of the brain. Alexander framed his observations with quotations from spiritual teachers and paired them with the recent work of scientists with the aim of bridging religion and science. He cross-referenced spiritual experiences from readers and different religions to build his case on what heaven looked like. The Map of Heaven was number 12 on the New York Times bestseller list during the week ending November 2, 2014.

=== Living in a Mindful Universe ===
Alexander's third book, Living in a Mindful Universe: A Neurosurgeon's Journey into the Heart of Consciousness, was coauthored with Karen Newell, cofounder of Sacred Acoustics, and published in 2017.

== Personal life ==
In 2000, Alexander located his birth parents but he was initially informed that his birth mother did not then wish to meet with him. Later on his birth mother changed her mind and agreed to meet with him. In 2007, Alexander was finally able to meet with both his birth parents and his birth siblings.
