= September 1975 =

Month of 1975

<<	September 1975					>>
Su	Mo	Tu	We	Th	Fr	Sa
	1	2	3	4	5	6
7	8	9	10	11	12	13
14	15	16	17	18	19	20
21	22	23	24	25	26	27
28	29	30

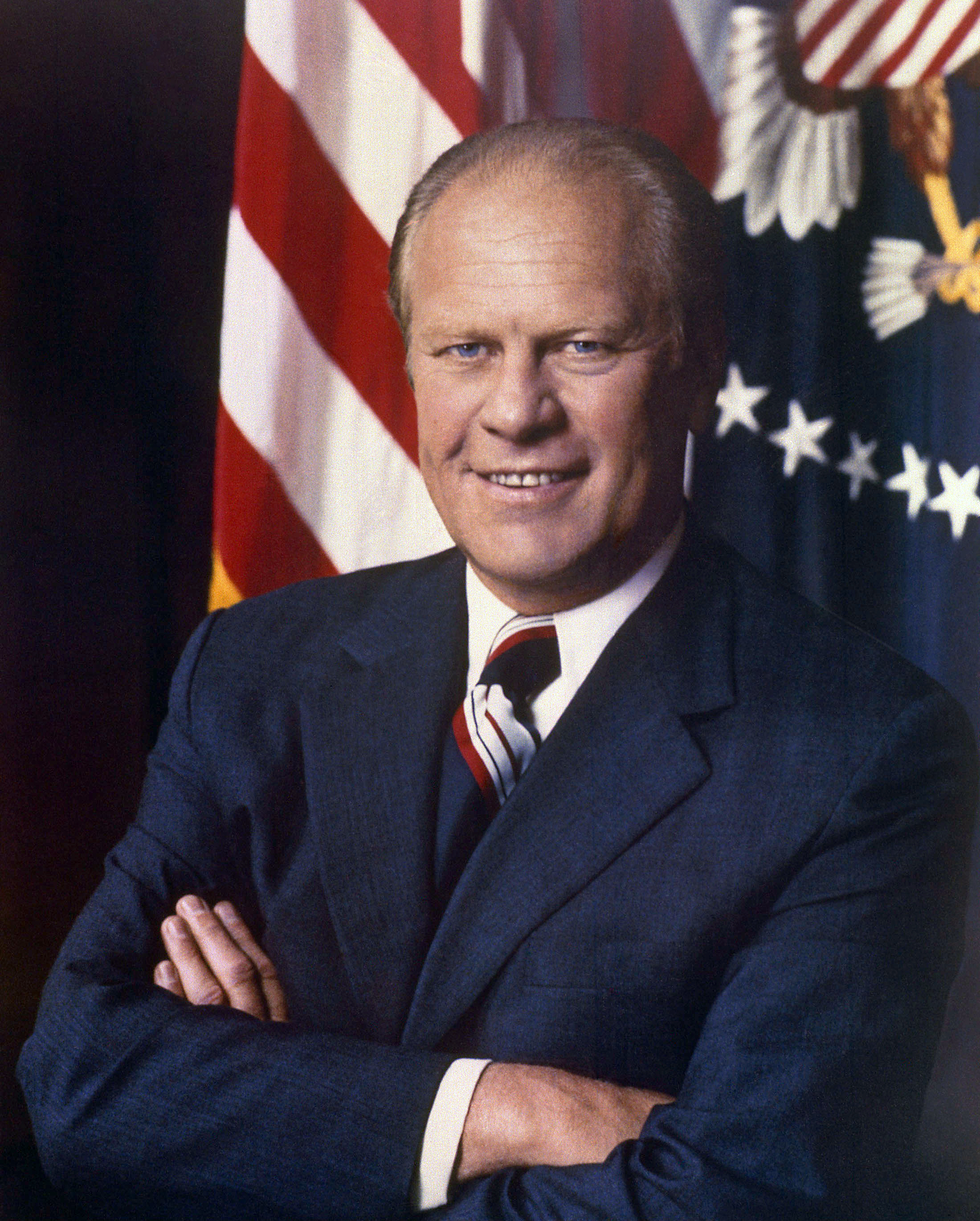
U.S. President Gerald Ford, targeted twice in same month

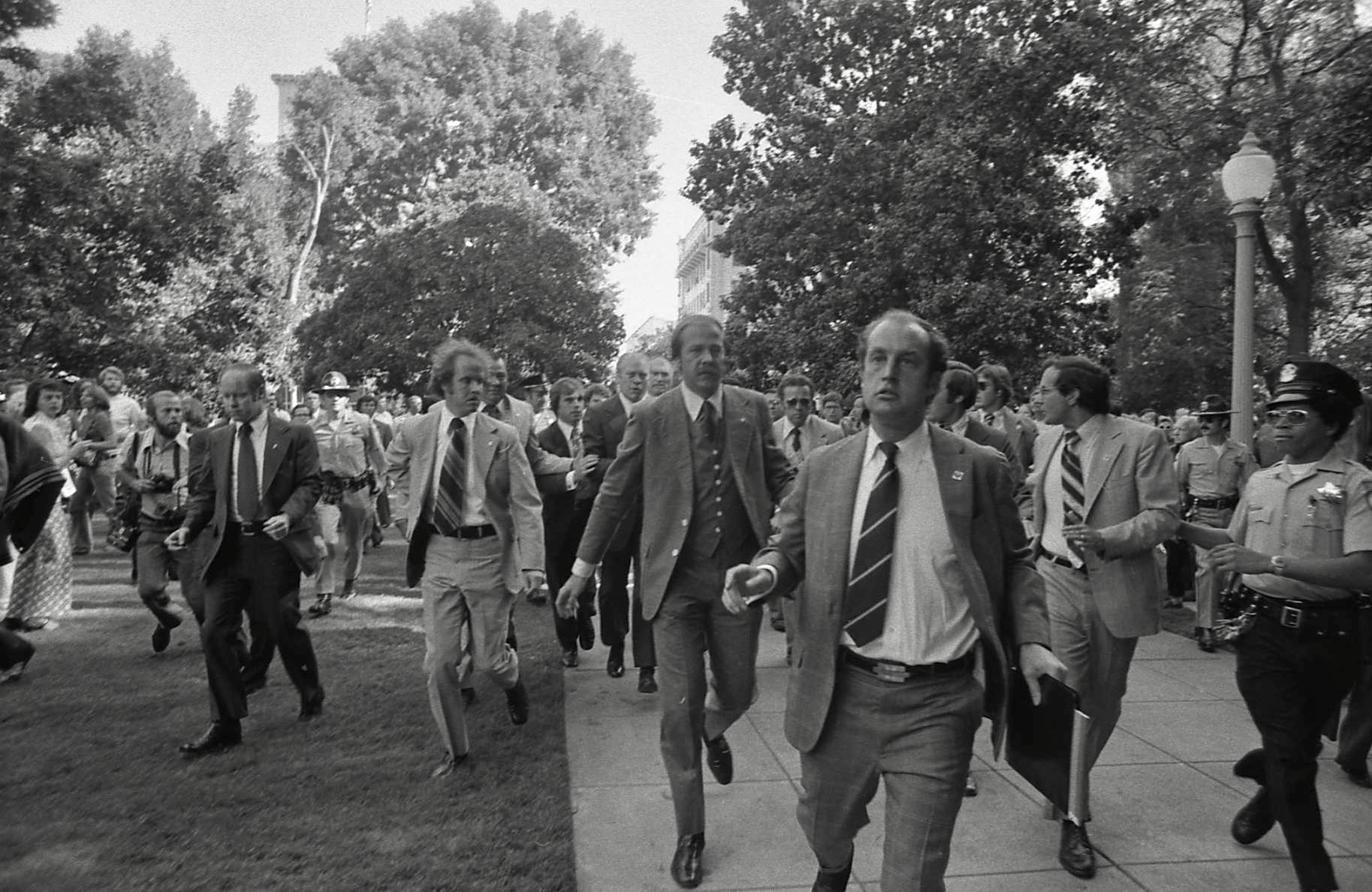
September 5, 1975: "Squeaky" Fromme attempt to shoot the president fails

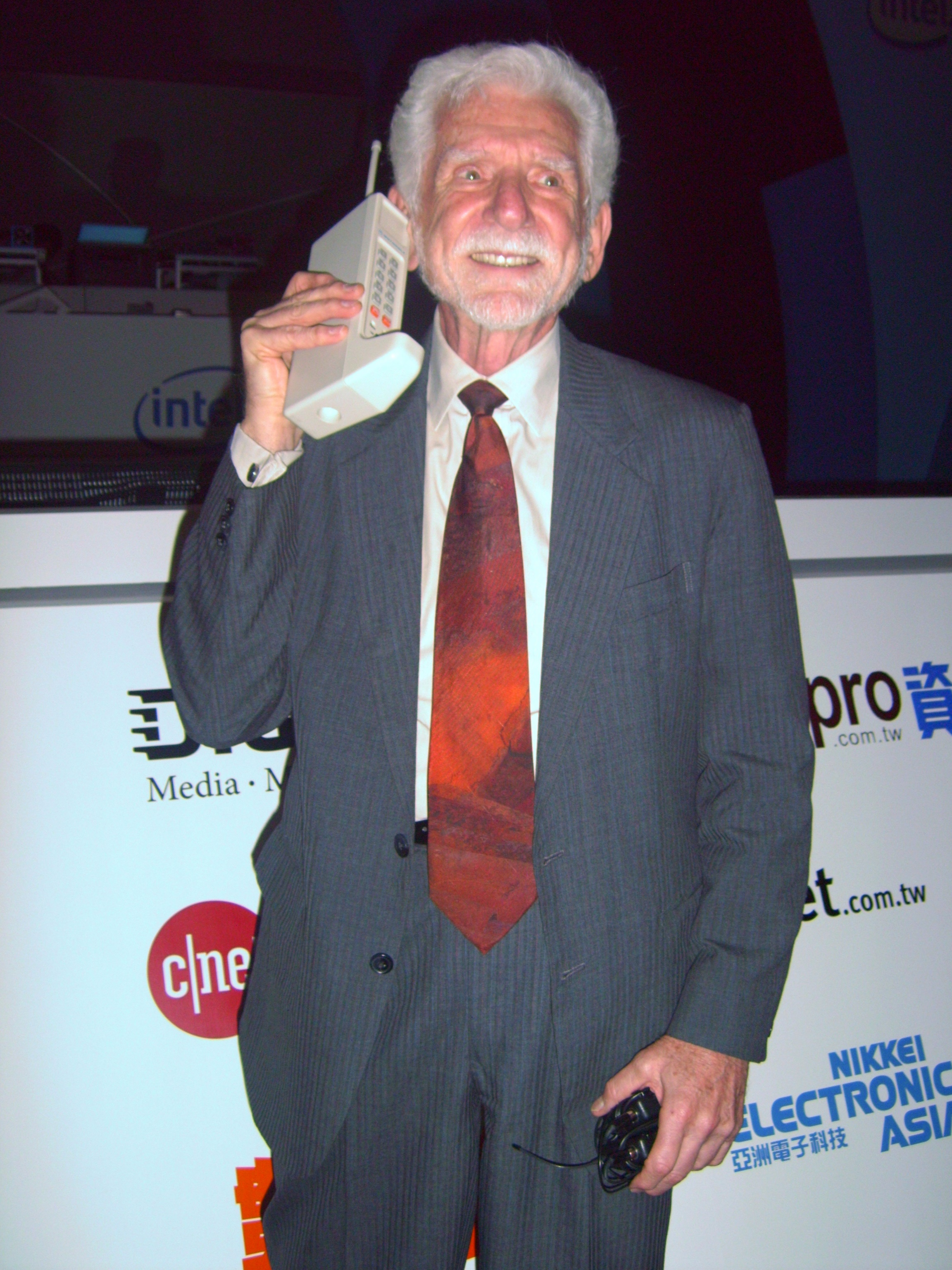
September 16, 1975: Martin Cooper gets patent for "radio telephone system"

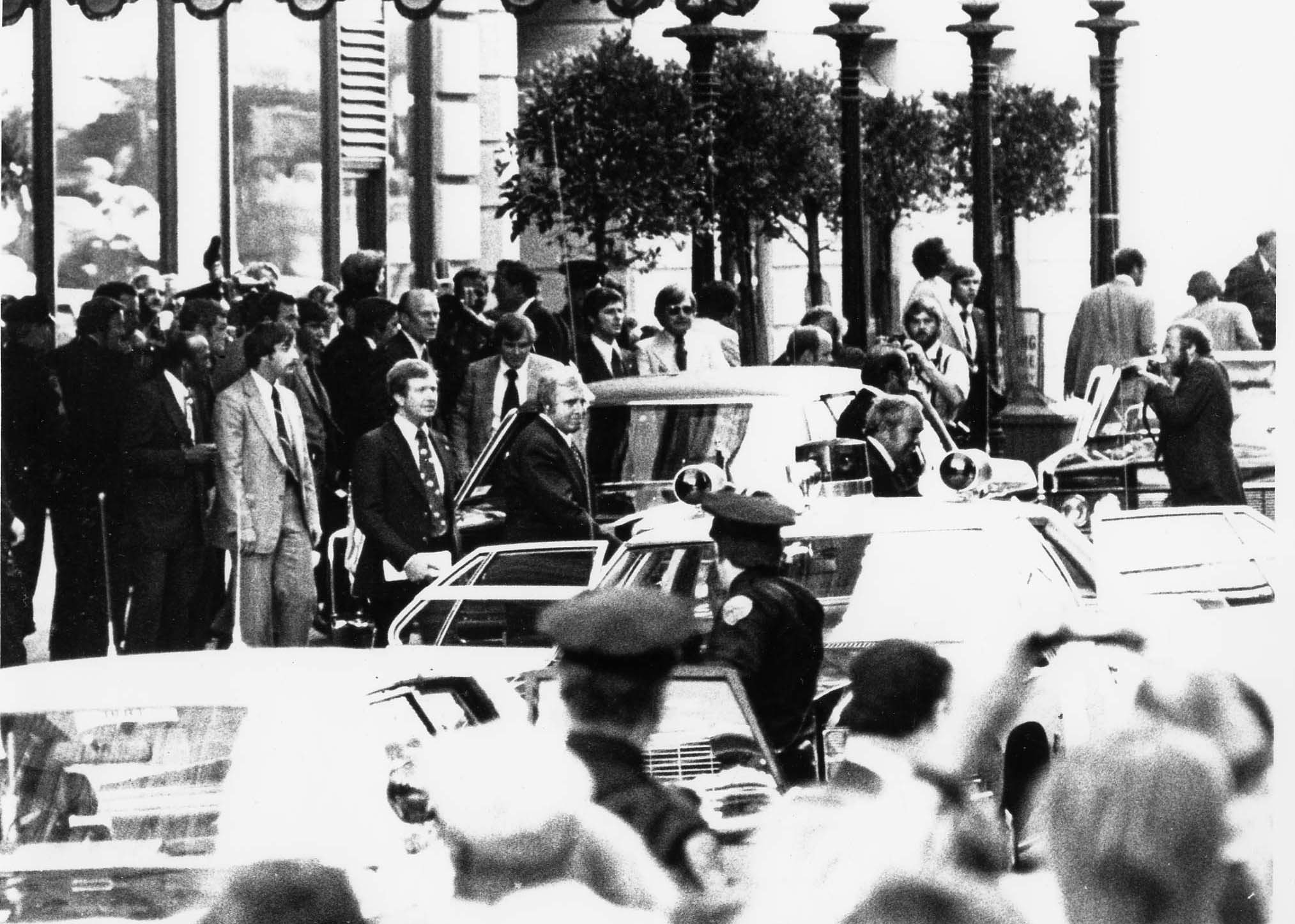
September 22, 1975: Sara Jane Moore shoots at the president

The following events occurred in September 1975:

== September 1, 1975 (Monday) ==
- The Republic of the North Solomons was declared on Bougainville Island, two weeks before Papua New Guinea was to become independent from Australia. District Commissioner Alexis Sarei was named as President. After failing to get recognition from any other nation, the North Solomons would agree to return to Papuan control on August 7, 1976, with some autonomy for Bougainville.
- The Turnhalle Constitutional Conference began in Windhoek between white, black and coloured residents to discuss the future of South West Africa (now Namibia).
- During an unsuccessful attempt to overthrow the government of Ecuador, 30 people were killed and at least 80 wounded. The Armed Forces Chief of Staff, General Raul Gonzalez Alvear, and his brother-in-law General Alejandros Solis, led the early morning uprising against President Guillermo Rodríguez Lara, attacking the Presidential Palace in Quito with 10 tanks. Rodríguez Lara had been able to escape his residence before the attackers arrived, fled to Riobamba and rallied the Air Force and Navy to make a counterattack at midday. Rodríguez Lara would be forced out of office four months later, on January 11, 1976.
- USAF Lieutenant General Daniel "Chappie" James was promoted, becoming the first African-American four-star general. General James, who was named the commander of NORAD, and would retire on February 2, 1978. He died 24 days after his retirement.
- Space: 1999, a syndicated science fiction program, produced in the United Kingdom by ITC Entertainment and the Italian company RAI, made its first appearance worldwide. Authorized for release worldwide in the month of September, the show was broadcast on some television stations on the first day of the month, including WGAN, channel 13 in Portland, Maine, which premiered it at 8:00 p.m. Eastern time. According to ITC, the show was distributed to 101 nations and was syndicated to 148 U.S. television markets alone. In most of the United Kingdom, Space: 1999 debuted on September 4 at 7:00 p.m. on some of the regions in the ITV network.
- The crash of an East German Interflug Airlines TU-134 jetliner killed 26 of 34 people on board, most of them West German businessmen who were on their way to Leipzig for a trade show.
- The Concorde became the first airplane to cross the Atlantic Ocean four times in a single day. The supersonic aircraft flew the 2,375 miles from London to Gander, Newfoundland in 2 hours, 19 minutes, refueled and received maintenance, and flew back. The double crossing was completed 13 hours and 59 minutes after it began.
- The "Sinai II" agreement was initialed by Egypt's President Sadat, the day after it had been initialed by Israel's Prime Minister Rabin.
- Ursus arctos horribilis, the North American brown bear, more commonly known at the grizzly bear, was placed on the U.S. Endangered Species List as a "threatened species".
- Frank Zeidler who had served as Mayor of Milwaukee, Wisconsin, from 1949 to 1961, was nominated as the presidential candidate for the Socialist Party USA.
- Born: Natalie Bassingthwaighte, Australian actress and singer, in Wollongong

== September 2, 1975 (Tuesday) ==
- The Finnish opera Viimeiset kiusaukset (The Last Temptations), authored by Joonas Kokkonen and one of Finland's most distinguished national operas, was given its first performance.
- The aircraft units of the Canadian Armed Forces (Air Defense Command, Air Transport Command, Mobile Command, Maritime Command and Training Command) were merged into one national air force, referred to as the Canadian Forces Air Command and more commonly called AIRCOM. On August 16, 2011, AIRCOM would be renamed the Royal Canadian Air Force to reflect the branch of the services that had existed before the 1986 merger.
- The Ho Chi Minh Mausoleum was opened in Hanoi so that the Vietnamese public could see the embalmed body of North Vietnam's founder, Ho Chi Minh, who had died in 1969.
- The World Football League owners voted 10–1 to revoke the franchise of the Chicago Winds, after two of the team's investors withdrew deposits of $350,000. The struggling American pro football league was left with ten teams, and would survive only until October 22.

== September 3, 1975 (Wednesday) ==
- Baseball player Steve Garvey began a streak of appearing in 1,207 consecutive MLB games, still a National League record (three other players – Cal Ripken Jr., Lou Gehrig and Everett Scott – all had longer streaks in the American League). Garvey would go until July 28, 1983, when a thumb injury took him out of the lineup.
- Born: Redfoo (Stefan Gordy), American musician and part of duo LMFAO, in Los Angeles
- Died: Wolfgang Gans zu Putlitz, 76, German-born spy who defected from Nazi Germany to the United Kingdom during World War II, and then from the U.K. to East Germany during the Cold War.

== September 4, 1975 (Thursday) ==
- The Sinai Interim Agreement was signed in Geneva by Major General Taha Magdoub for Egypt, and Major General Herzl Shafir for Israel, along with the ambassadors to Switzerland from the two nations, after having been initialed earlier in the week by Israel's Prime Minister Yitzhak Rabin and Egypt's President Anwar Sadat. Under the agreement, a 25 kilometer wide buffer zone was created in the Sinai Peninsula, to be patrolled by United Nations Emergency Force troops, and separating the armies of the two nations.
- Died: Walter Tetley, 60, American actor whose "perennially adolescent voice" allowed him to portray children on radio shows (The Great Gildersleeve) and in cartoons, most notably as "Sherman" on The Rocky and Bullwinkle Show

== September 5, 1975 (Friday) ==
- In Sacramento, California, Lynette Fromme, a follower of jailed cult leader Charles Manson, attempted to assassinate U.S. President Gerald Ford, but was thwarted by United States Secret Service agent Larry M. Buendorf. Fromme was three feet away from the President as he walked through a crowd near the California State Capitol building at 10:00 am local time, pointed a .45 caliber automatic pistol at his chest and pulled the trigger, but had failed to operate the slide mechanism to put a cartridge into the firing chamber. Buendorf would report later that Fromme, realizing her mistake, said, "Oh, shit, it didn't go off; it didn't go off." Fromme would serve 34 years in prison, and would be released, at age 60, on August 14, 2009.
- The London Hilton hotel was bombed by the Provisional Irish Republican Army, killing 2 people and injuring 63.
- Died:
  - Georg Ots, 55, Estonian opera singer
  - Alice C. Evans, 94, American microbiologist

== September 6, 1975 (Saturday) ==
- A 6.7 magnitude earthquake struck Eastern Turkey at 12:20 pm local time, killing 2,385 people in the Diyarbakır province, mostly (1,500) in the town of Lice.
- Born: Ryoko Tani, Japanese judoka, winner of 7 women's world championships, Olympic gold medalist 2000, 2004, in Fukuoka
- Died: Shelton Brooks, 89, Canadian-American popular music composer

== September 7, 1975 (Sunday) ==
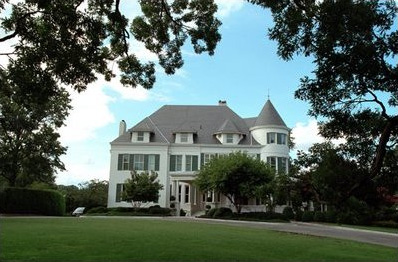
The Vice-Presidential mansion

- Number One Observatory Circle was dedicated as the official residence of the Vice-President of the United States. Previously, American vice-presidents either already had homes near Washington, D.C., or rented temporary lodging. The first residents were Vice-President Nelson Rockefeller and his wife Happy Rockefeller.
- Niki Lauda clinched the World Driving Championship by finishing in sixth place in the 1975 Italian Grand Prix, with only two races left for the season.
- Four American women became the last improperly ordained priests of the Episcopal Church, as Lee McGee, Alison Palmer, Betty Rosenberg and Diane Tickell brought to 15 the number of females to receive authority "to preach the word of God and to administer His holy sacraments". These women would become known as the "Washington Four". On July 29, 1974, a group of women known as the "Philadelphia Eleven" had been the first to be ordained. At the 1976 General Convention of the church, all fifteen women were approved as priests.
- The Timorese Democratic Union (UDT), which had been fighting against Fretilin for control of the colony of Portuguese Timor, issued a proclamation in favor of integration of the area into neighboring Indonesia after having been promised by the Indonesian government that the Timorese people would have an autonomous government.

== September 8, 1975 (Monday) ==
- On a cover captioned "I Am a Homosexual", U.S. Air Force Technical Sergeant Leonard Matlovich became the first openly gay cover subject of Time magazine after being discharged from the service for admitting his sexual orientation. Author Randy Shilts would comment later that "It marked the first time the young gay movement had made the cover of a major newsweekly. To a movement still struggling for legitimacy, the event was a major turning point." Matlovich, a Vietnam War veteran with a Bronze Star and a Purple Heart, would eventually settle his lawsuit against the U.S. Air Force for $160,000 and continue his work as a spokesman for gay rights. He would die from complications of AIDS in 1988.
- Two gunmen took control of a Paris bank, taking seven hostages, then escaping with $1,360,000 in ransom money.
- After California passed the first (and only) law in the United States to permit farm workers to organize labor unions, hundreds of vegetable workers for Bruce Church, Inc. voted in the first election on the choice of whether to join the United Farm Workers, the Teamsters, or no union at all. The UFW won the voting.
- For the first time since 1961, the United States authorized merchant ships from Cuba to enter American ports for refueling, as well as to no longer raise objections if other nations permitted port access to Cuban vessels.
- Officials in the intelligence agencies of Israel (the Mossad) and West Germany (the Bundesnachrichtendienst or BND) met secretly to discuss a joint effort to conduct a new type of electronic eavesdropping by Mossad on foreign offices in Germany.

== September 9, 1975 (Tuesday) ==
- The Communist nation of Albania issued a decree ordering a change of names for "all Albanian citizens who have inappropriate names in view of the political, ideological and moral standards", apparently to require non-Muslim minorities (such as Roman Catholics, Orthodox Christians and Romani people or "Gypsies") to take on less "Western-sounding" names. The decree was published in the official journal Buletinit të Njoftimeve Zyrtare and would not be noticed in the West until February 25. Among those whose names would be changed in the decree were 11-year-old Edvin Kristaq Rama who, as Edi Rama, would become Prime Minister of Albania in 2013.
- Welcome Back, Kotter premiered on the ABC television network in the U.S.. Starring Gabe Kaplan, the comedy introduced actor John Travolta, who played the role of student "Vinnie Barbarino".
- Riverfront Coliseum opened in Cincinnati.
- Two British commercial divers, Roger Baldwin and Peter Holmes, died from hyperthermia while in saturation in the British Sector of the North Sea.
- Born: Michael Bublé, Canadian musician, in Burnaby, British Columbia
- Died:
  - Minta Durfee, 85, American film actress
  - Ethel Griffies, 97, English film actress
  - John McGiver, 61, American TV character actor

== September 10, 1975 (Wednesday) ==
- Former U.S. Army Lieutenant William Calley was released from house arrest after serving a little more than four years for a court martial conviction for the My Lai Massacre deaths of 109 South Vietnamese civilians Originally sentenced to life imprisonment in 1971, Calley was transferred to home incarceration three months later, and gradually had his term reduced to 20 and then 10 years.
- Viking 2, which had originally been slated to be sent for a July landing on Mars until problems forced it to be replaced by a backup, was launched as the second vehicle to the "red planet". After descending from Mars orbit, Viking 2 lander would land at the Utopia Planitia on Mars on September 3, 1976, and transmit data until April 12, 1980.
- Died: George Paget Thomson, 83, English physicist, 1937 Nobel Prize laureate

== September 11, 1975 (Thursday) ==
- Serial killer Joseph James DeAngelo, at the time an officer with the Exeter, California police department, killed the first of 13 victims, shooting college professor Claude Snelling during a home invasion. Over the next 11 years, he would terrorize southern California, committing rapes and murders, and become known in the media as "The Night Stalker" before ceasing his criminal activity, and turning to calling and taunting his surviving victims. In 2018, DeAngelo would be arrested based on DNA evidence and sentenced to life in prison.
- Six days after escaping an assassination attempt, U.S. President Ford began wearing a bulletproof vest beneath his shirt and suit. The bulk from the vest was noticeable as the President arrived in Keene, New Hampshire for a political fundraiser.
- Former United Mine Workers President Tony Boyle was sentenced to three life terms in prison for carrying out the 1969 assassination of his union rival, Jock Yablonski, as well as Yablonski's wife, Margaret and their daughter, Charlotte, while they slept in their home in Clarksville, Pennsylvania.

== September 12, 1975 (Friday) ==
- The case of In re Quinlan, which would lead to a landmark decision in permitting the "right to die" for persons kept alive by artificial means, was filed by the father of Karen Ann Quinlan in the Superior Court in Morris County, New Jersey.
- Wish You Were Here, the new album by Pink Floyd, was released in the United Kingdom, and would go on sale in the United States the next day.
- Born: Luis Castillo, Dominican born MLB second baseman, in San Pedro de Macorís
- Died:
  - General Mohammad Khatam, 55, Chief of Staff of the Imperial Iranian Air Force and Iran's most decorated pilot, was killed in a hang gliding accident,
  - Berwind P. Kaufmann, 78, American biologist

== September 13, 1975 (Saturday) ==
- Argentina's President Isabel Perón, believed to be "on the edge of a nervous breakdown", took a temporary leave of absence and was replaced by Senate President Italo Luder. She would return to office on October 16.
- Aloha Stadium in Honolulu, Hawaii hosted its first event, with Texas A&M University beating the University of Hawaii Warriors, 43 to 9. The stadium had a unique design that allowed it to be reconfigured for ideal seating for various purposes. Four of its 7,000 seat sections could be moved on an air cushion to accommodate a baseball diamond, a football field or a concert venue.

== September 14, 1975 (Sunday) ==
- Elizabeth Seton was canonized, becoming the first American Roman Catholic saint.
- Rembrandt's painting "The Night Watch", dating from the 17th century, was slashed a dozen times at the Rijksmuseum in Amsterdam. Wilhelmus De Rijk, an unemployed schoolteacher, was committed to a mental hospital at Middenbeemster after slicing the canvas with a kitchen knife, and would commit suicide in 1976. The Night Watch was also attacked on January 13, 1911, and on April 6, 1990, also by unemployed Dutchmen.

== September 15, 1975 (Monday) ==
- Chris Balderstone, who bowled for the England cricket team and played midfield for Doncaster Rovers F.C. in The Football League became the first and, thus far, only person to play first-class matches in both sports on the same day. In the afternoon, he played for the Foxes of Leicestershire against the Falcons of Derbyshire, then travelled from Chesterfield to Doncaster, where he suited up for the Rovers and played in their 1–1 draw with the Bees of Brentford in a fourth-division match. The next day, he returned to Chesterfield to help Leicestershire's win its first championship.
- In Argentina, the broadcasts of the TV signal LU 90 Channel 7 of the province of Chubut began.

== September 16, 1975 (Tuesday) ==
Papua New Guinea

- U.S. Patent No. 3,906,166 was granted to Martin Cooper and others on his team at Motorola, for the first hand-held cell phone, after it had been applied for on October 17, 1973. Cooper's team worked at reducing the original 28 pound Motorola portable device to the first hand-held mobile phone, the DynaTAC, which weighed less than three pounds, and made the world's first cell phone call on April 3, 1973.
- Papua New Guinea gained its independence from Australia.
- John A. Durkin won a second election against Louis C. Wyman for one of New Hampshire's two U.S. Senate seats, filling a vacancy that had existed since January when neither candidate was seated after the November 5, 1974 election, which Durkin had won by only 10 votes.
- The prototype of the Soviet Mikoyan MiG-31 "Foxhound" jet fighter was given its first test flight, with Aleksandr Fedotov at the controls. The real MiG-31 shared its name with the fictional MiG-31 "Firefox" featured in the 1982 Clint Eastwood film Firefox and the 1977 Craig Thomas novel Firefox, upon which the film was based.
- CIA Director William E. Colby admitted to the U.S. Senate Intelligence Committee that the CIA had ignored a 1970 presidential order to destroy a cache of deadly poisons and lethal weapons, and the materials were still in storage.
- Born: Shannon Noll, Australian singer; in Orange, New South Wales

== September 17, 1975 (Wednesday) ==
- A Miami gas station attendant became the first known victim of a taser. William Lawson, 27, had been approached by a woman who fired the wire-connected darts, striking him with 50,000 volts of electricity, after which she and a male accomplice cleaned out the cash register. Eight of the "Taser Public Defender" guns had been stolen from an office in Miami Shores, Florida. Lawson told reporters later that being "tazed" "was like sticking your finger in a wall socket", adding "I'd rather it had been somebody else."

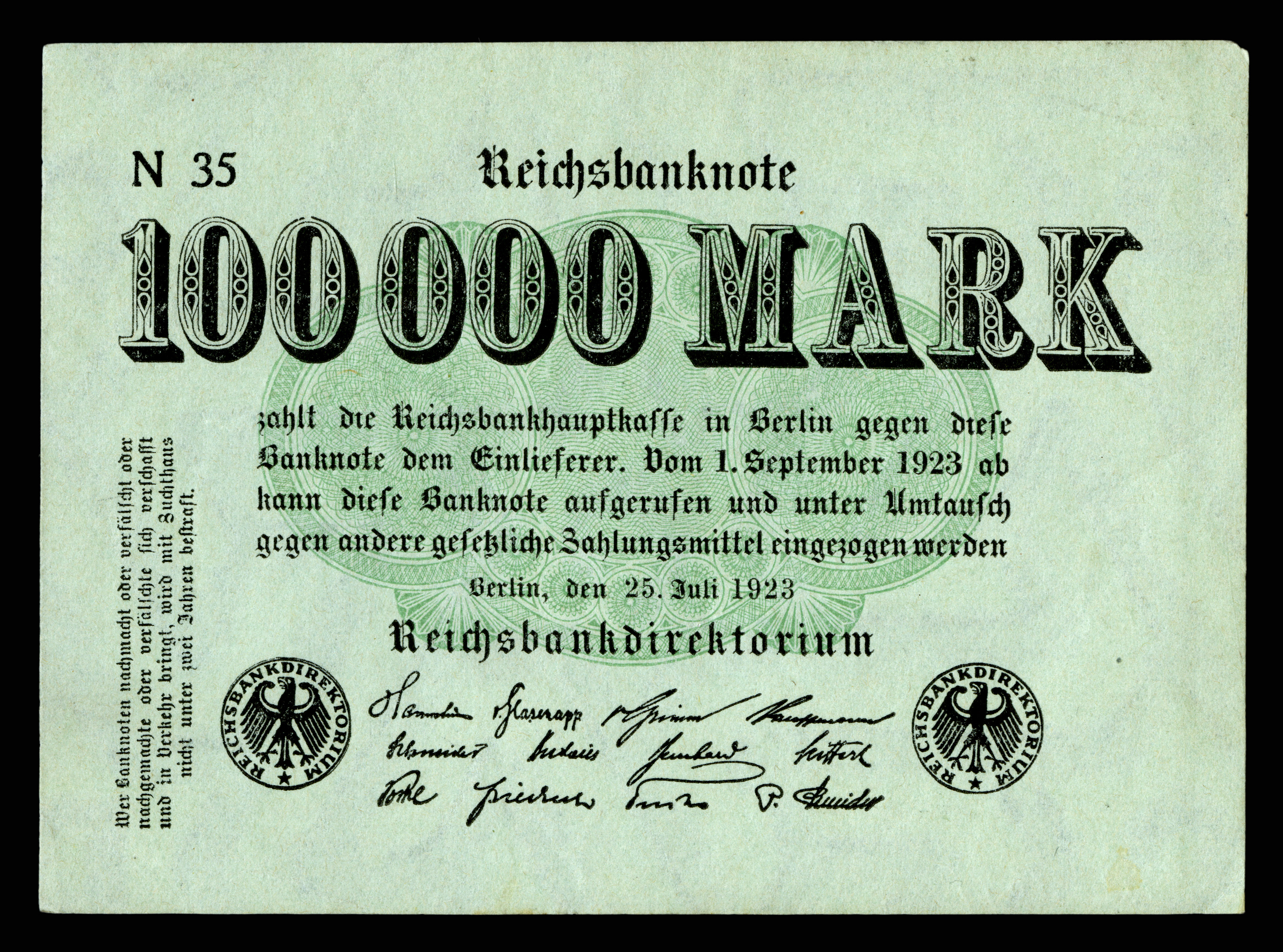
100,000 Marks, 1923

- Stephen Holcomb Jr., a resident of Traverse City, Michigan walked into a branch of the National Bank and Trust Company with a German Reichbank note for 100,000 marks and presented it for conversion to U.S. dollars. The note had been minted in 1923 during the use of the papiermark currency in the Weimar Republic during a period of hyperinflation and was worth less than one cent American, but the teller used the 1976 exchange rate for the Deutsche Mark and presented Holcomb with $39,700 in cash. Holcomb was not charged with a crime because he hadn't specifically requested the exchange at 1976 rates, but was sued by the bank later after having gone on a spending spree that left the bank still having failed to recover $18,177 of the money that it had given him.
- Dannion Brinkley was struck by lightning in Aiken, South Carolina, while talking on the phone during a thunderstorm. He would later write about his near-death experience in a best-selling book, Saved by the Light, reporting his glimpse of the afterlife during an extended period of clinical death.
- Born:
  - Jimmie Johnson, American NASCAR driver and Daytona 500 winner 2006 and 2013; in El Cajon, California
  - Austin St. John, American TV actor (Mighty Morphin Power Rangers), as Jason Geiger in Roswell, New Mexico

== September 18, 1975 (Thursday) ==
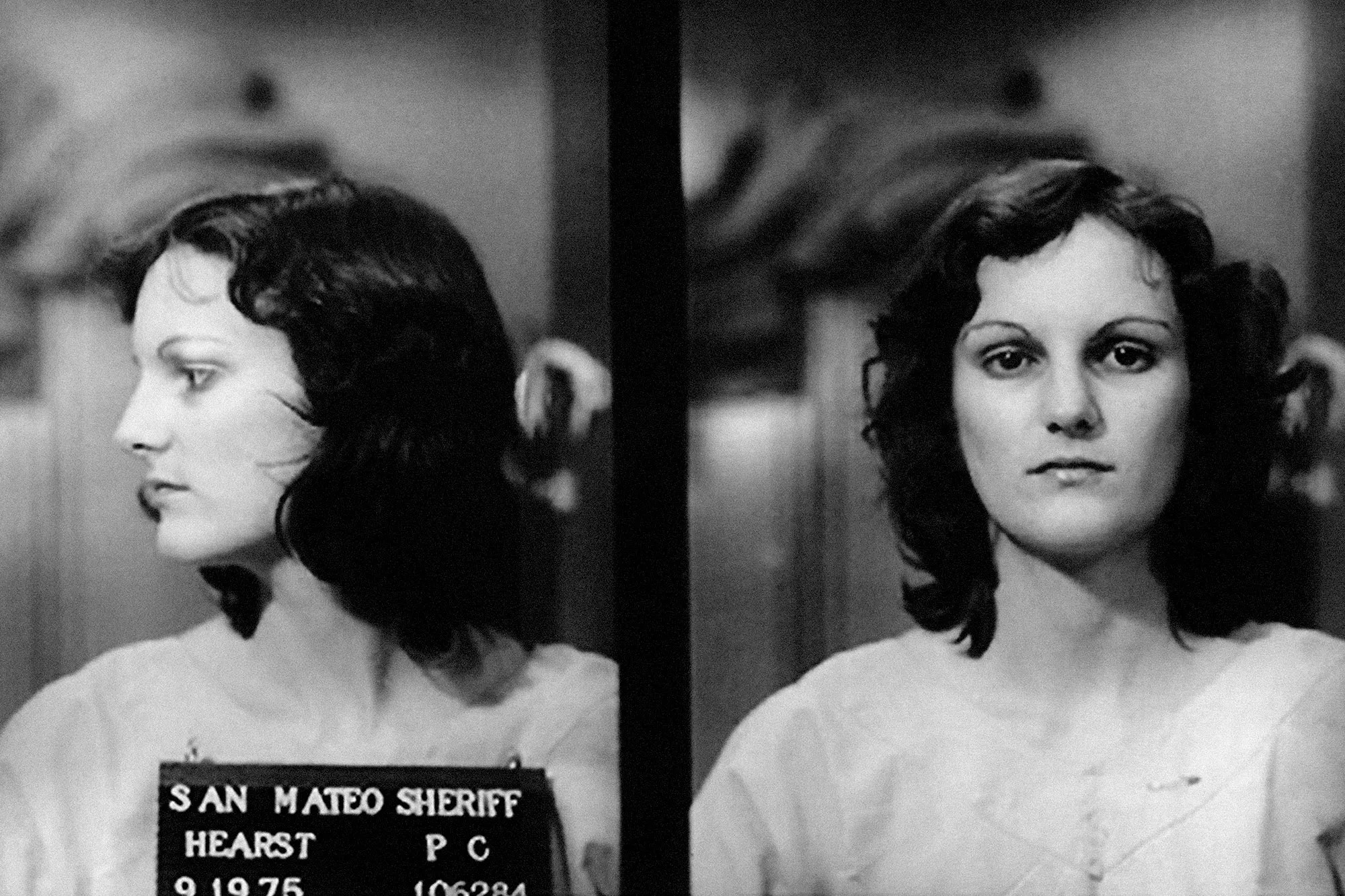
Patty Hearst apprehended

- Fugitive Patricia Hearst was captured in San Francisco. Hearst, granddaughter of publisher William Randolph Hearst and heiress to a newspaper fortune, had been kidnapped from her apartment on February 4, 1974, by an American terrorist group that called itself the Symbionese Liberation Army. By April, she had joined her kidnappers, and participated in crimes as she eluded capture for 19 months. Earlier in the day, the FBI had captured two of the original kidnappers, William Harris and Emily Harris, who had been out jogging; Hearst, and fellows SLA member Wendy Yoshimura, were captured at an apartment on 425 Morse Street. Former kidnap victim Patty Hearst would be convicted on March 20, 1976, of bank robbery. She would be released from a federal prison in Pleasanton, California, on February 1, 1979, days after U.S. President Jimmy Carter commuted her sentence, and would be granted a full pardon by U.S. President Bill Clinton on his final morning in office, on January 20, 2001.
- The George Jackson Brigade bombed a Safeway supermarket in Capitol Hill, Seattle, in solidarity with both the SLA and with a sympathizer of the United Farm Workers who had died while planting a bomb at the Safeway earlier that week.

== September 19, 1975 (Friday) ==
- The Angkar Loeu ("Center"), consisting of the leadership of the Communist revolutionary government of Democratic Kampuchea (Cambodia), abolished the use of money, because "it creates individual and private ownership". In the same decree, formal schooling was abandoned indefinitely although people would be permitted to "educate themselves".
- Philippines President Ferdinand Marcos dismissed 2,000 government and military officials as "traitors" to his New Society program, and warned that the purges "had only just begun".

== September 20, 1975 (Saturday) ==
- The five-year term of Abdul Halim of Kedah, as the fifth head of state of Malaysia (the Yang di-Pertuan Agong) ended. He would continue as Sultan of Kedah, and in 2011, would become the first person to regain the unique office of an elected monarch.
- Saturday Night Live with Howard Cosell premiered on the American ABC television network at 8:00 pm, three weeks before the premiere of the more successful NBC television series, Saturday Night Live.
- The championship of the minor American Soccer League (ASL) was played between the New York Apollo and the Boston Astros were declared co-champions by Commissioner Bob Cousy after the two tied 1 to 1 in regulation time at Mount Vernon, New York, and then played nine sudden-death overtime periods without either team scoring, and "the game was called because of curfew."
- Born:
  - Juan Pablo Montoya, Colombian race car driver, 2000 Indianapolis 500 winner, in Bogotá
  - Jared C. Monti, American Medal of Honor winner, in Abington, Massachusetts (killed 2006)
  - Asia Argento, Italian actress, singer and director, in Rome
- Died:
  - Saint-John Perse (Alexis leger), 88, French poet, 1960 Nobel Prize in Literature laureate
  - Doria Shafiq, 67, Egyptian women's rights activist, after jumping to her death from her 6th floor apartment.

== September 21, 1975 (Sunday) ==
- Frank G. Zarb, head of the U.S. Federal Energy Administration, announced that the President had rescinded part of a $2.00 per barrel fee on imported oil, reducing the price per barrel of refined petroleum products to $1.40.
- Sultan Yahya Petra of Kelantan became the sixth Yang di-Pertuan Agong, an elected monarch, of Malaysia.
- The Kingdom of Saudi Arabia launched the Royal Commission for Jubail and Yanbu, one of the largest investment projects of the 20th century marking the beginning of a new era in industrialization for the kingdom and a benchmark for the petrochemical industry around the world. The multibillion-dollar investment exceeded speculations, with two twin industrial cities on the east and west coast of the Arabian peninsula being constructed from scratch.

== September 22, 1975 (Monday) ==
- U.S. President Gerald Ford survived a second assassination attempt, this time by Sara Jane Moore in San Francisco. As a UPI report noted, "It was the second time in 17 days that a woman tried to assassinate Ford in California." Oliver Sipple, a 33-year-old gay man, grabbed Ms. Moore's arm after she successfully fired a .38 caliber bullet at the President outside the St. Francis Hotel. At the time of the shooting, 3:30 p.m., Ms. Moore's 9-year-old son was waiting for her to pick him up after the end of classes at the Kittredge School. San Francisco police had seized a .44 caliber revolver, purchased in Danville, California, from gun collector Maria Fernwood from Moore the day before, after she had suggested that she planned to assassinate the President, but Moore bought a .38 caliber revolver from Ms. Fernwood on Monday morning, hours before the shooting.

== September 23, 1975 (Tuesday) ==
- In the course of a renewed campaign against religion, the government of Albania issued Decree #5339, requiring all persons with "religious" names (such as those with a Muslim, Hebrew or Christian origin) to change them to "Illyrian" names that had been used by ethnic Albanians before Christianity had been introduced.
- Born: Kim Dong-moon, South Korean badminton player, Olympic gold medalist 1996 and 2000, doubles world championships in 1999 and 2003; in Gokseong

== September 24, 1975 (Wednesday) ==
- The crash of Garuda Indonesia Flight 150 in Indonesia killed 24 of the 60 people on board, and one on the ground, while attempting to land at Palembang in poor weather and fog.
- Dougal Haston and Doug Scott on the 1975 British Mount Everest Southwest Face expedition became the first people to reach the summit of Mount Everest by any of its faces and the first Britons to reach the summit by any route.
- Oliver Sipple, the disabled former U.S. Marine who had helped save President Ford from assassination, was "outed" by San Francisco Chronicle gossip columnist Herb Caen, who received information from gay activist Harvey Milk that Sipple was homosexual. Without specifically calling Sipple gay, Caen wrote that Sipple "was the center of midnight attention at the Red Lantern, a Golden Gate Ave. bar he favors", and that Rev. Ray Broshears, head of the Helping Hands center and Gay Politico Harvey Milk, who claim to be among Sipple's close friends, describe themselves as "proud- maybe this will help break the stereotype." Sipple's Midwestern family, who were unaware of his sexual orientation, would disown him. Sipple would later commit suicide.
- Dr. Andreas Gruentzig of West Germany made the first successful test of the technique of coronary angioplasty, in experiments on dogs. The first human angioplasty would take place almost a year later, on September 16, 1976.
- The short-lived civil war in Portuguese East Timor ended as Fretilin drove back the UDT across the border into Indonesia and the province of West Timor.
- Died: Earle Cabell, 68, former mayor of Dallas 1961–64, U.S. Congressman 1965–73

== September 25, 1975 (Thursday) ==
- U.S. President Ford sent a personal letter of thanks to disabled former Marine and Vietnam War veteran Oliver Sipple, who had stopped Sara Jane Moore's assassination attempt earlier in the week. "I want you to know how much I appreciated your selfless actions last Monday... you acted quickly and without fear for your own safety", Ford wrote, adding, "By doing so you helped to avert danger to me and to others in the crowd. You have my heartfelt appreciation." Earlier in the week, Sipple had been "outed" by leaders of San Francisco's gay community, who suggested that the President had hesitated in thanking a gay man for saving his life.
- Two of the most successful teams of the 10-team American Basketball Association, the Denver Nuggets and the New York Nets, applied for membership in the then 18-team National Basketball Association for the 1976–77 NBA season. ABA Commissioner Dave DeBusschere was preparing to announce a network television contract when the news came, bringing negotiations to a halt.
- U.S. Commerce Secretary Rogers C. B. Morton announced to the National Press Club that a statistic called the "T-Dollar" would be used in future press releases, with the idea that every one billion dollars in federal spending was $14.06 in federal tax money for each American household. "When the average consumer reads that government has appropriated $10 billion for this or that program, this astronomical sum has no meaning whatsoever for him. He can't relate to it. Nothing in his personal experience prepares him even to differentiate between $1 billion, $10 billion or $100 billion. All are equally meaningless", Morton said. The figure of $14.06 was derived by dividing one billion by the 71,120,000 households in the United States.
- Born:
  - Matt Hasselbeck, American NFL quarterback, in Boulder, Colorado
  - Declan Donnelly, British TV star (Ant and Dec), in Newcastle upon Tyne
- Died:
  - Bob Considine, 67, American newspaper columnist
  - Chester C. Davis, 87, controversial director of the U.S. Agricultural Adjustment Administration during the Great Depression, former Federal Reserve Board member, and food administrator during World War II.
  - Joachim Wendler, 36, West German aquanaut, from a gas embolism while returning to the surface of the Gulf of Maine from the Helgoland Habitat

== September 26, 1975 (Friday) ==
- The Rocky Horror Picture Show, which would become a cult film classic, after being adapted from a British stage play, was first shown, debuting in Westwood, Los Angeles. The film was a flop until April 1, 1976, when midnight screenings at the Waverly Theater in New York City were accompanied by audience participation, which became a fad in the late 1970s.
- The U.S. Congress, in agreement with President Ford, voted to restore price controls on oil and gasoline for another 50 days, to last until November 15. The price freeze had expired on September 1, and the controls were extended retroactively by a vote of 75–3 in the Senate and 342–16 in the House.
- Died: Rafael Aguiñada Carranza, 45, a Salvadoran labor activist and an opposition party representative in the Legislative Assembly of El Salvador, was assassinated by gunmen who fired at his car with submachine guns as he was driving through San Salvador. His death came shortly after he had made his last speech denouncing El Salvador's military regime."Rafael (El Chele) Aguiñada Carranza: diputado asesinado que aún busca justicia" [Rafael (El Chele) Aguiñada Carranza: assassinated congressman who still seeks justice]. ContraPunto Digital (in Spanish). November 5, 2025.

== September 27, 1975 (Saturday) ==
- The last use of capital punishment in Spain took place a day after Spanish dictator Francisco Franco rejected worldwide pleas for mercy for five dissidents. Txiki Paredes and Ángel Otaegui were members of the Basque separatist group ETA, while Humberto Baena, José Luis Sánchez Bravo, and Ramón García Sanz were from the Frente Revolucionario Antifascista y Patriótico (FRAP). The convicts were shot by firing squad less than two months before Franco's death. Twelve European nations recalled their ambassadors from Spain, and thousands of people demonstrated Franco's government. Spain would abolish the death penalty for peacetime crimes in 1978.
- Chad's President Félix Malloum ordered all French troops to leave the African nation, because France was negotiating with Chadian rebel leader Hissène Habré for the release of French hostages. The withdrawal was completed by October 27.
- Died:
  - Mark Frechette, 27, American film actor and armed robber, was killed in a weightlifting accident in prison.
  - Charlie Monroe, 72, American bluegrass musician
  - J. T. Lang, 98, Australian politician and controversial premier of the state of New South Wales.

== September 28, 1975 (Sunday) ==
- The first x-ray burster star to be discovered from Earth was observed by a team led by astronomer Jonathan Grindlay, who observed two x-ray bursts from the source 4U in NGC 6624.
- Saint John Macías (1585–1645) was canonized by Pope Paul VI.
- The first Long Beach Grand Prix was held on the streets of Long Beach, California and won by Brian Redman, who beat out early leaders Mario Andretti and Al Unser. The route of the Indy-car race took drivers along Ocean Boulevard, Linden Avenue, Shoreline Drive and Pine Avenue.

== September 29, 1975 (Monday) ==
- The Chicago Tribune abandoned its standard practice of phonetic spelling of certain common words after 41 years. Since January 28, 1934, the Tribune had set out to simplify spelling for 80 common words, including the rendition of "phantom" as "fantom" and "rhyme" as "rime". After expanding the list in 1949, the Tribune had reversed some decisions, such as spelling "sophomore" as "sofomore", "out of concern for schoolchildren who might be confused". It retained, however, such spellings as "thru", "altho" and "thoro" (for "through", "although" and "thorough"). Finally, the paper announced in a September 29 editorial that "Today we are adopting a new stylebook. Thru, tho and thoro are abandoned. Regretfully we concede they have not made the grade in spelling class... Sanity some day may come to spelling, but we do not want to make any more trouble between Johnny and his teacher."
- Singer Jackie Wilson, most famous for his 1967 hit, "(Your Love Keeps Lifting Me) Higher and Higher", collapsed after finishing a concert performance of his 1958 song, "Lonely Teardrops", taking place at Cherry Hill, New Jersey. He would never regain consciousness, remaining in a coma for more than eight years before dying on January 21, 1984.
- Died: Casey Stengel, 85, American baseball outfielder and manager.

== September 30, 1975 (Tuesday) ==
- The prototype of the AH-64 Apache helicopter made its first flight. The Apache, an attack helicopter that could fire armor-piercing shells, withstand anti-aircraft fire, and fly missions under adverse conditions, would become a U.S. Army aircraft in 1985.
- The cable television pay channel Home Box Office (HBO) dramatically increased its number of subscribers by bringing the "Thrilla in Manila" to home viewers at no extra charge. The boxing match, between Muhammad Ali and Joe Frazier, actually began at 10:45 in the morning of October 1 in the Philippine capital, but was seen in the United States at 7:45 p.m. Pacific time and 10:45 p.m. Eastern. Previously, fights on closed-circuit television had been available only to people who purchased tickets to view the event at a theater, and, true to its name, HBO provided the alternative of watching a big box office event at low cost in one's home.
- Born:
  - Marion Cotillard, French film actress (La Vie en rose, in Paris)
  - Glenn Fredly, Indonesian actor, producer and R&B singer in Jakarta, Indonesia (d. 2020)
