= Paul Perry (author) =

American writer

- Education: Arizona State University; Antioch University (MFA)
- Occupations: Writer, filmmaker
- Spouse: Darlene Perry
- Children: 3
- Website: www.paulperryproductions.com

Paul Perry is the coauthor of several New York Times bestsellers, including Evidence of the Afterlife, Closer to the Light, Transformed by the Light, and Saved by the Light, the last of which was adapted into a television film of the same name. His books have been published in more than 30 languages around the world and cover a variety of subjects from near-death experiences to the biographies of authors Ken Kesey and Hunter S. Thompson.

Perry is also a documentary filmmaker and owns Paul Perry Productions, a film production company, in Paradise Valley, Arizona. His writing and filmmaking earned him a knighthood in the Royal Family of Portugal, where he is a Knight Commander in the Order of Saint Michael of the Wing and the official filmmaker of the Portuguese Royal House.

== Early life and education ==
Perry is a graduate of Arizona State University and has a Master of Fine Arts from Antioch University Los Angeles. He was also a fellow at the Gannett Center for Media Studies at Columbia University and taught magazine writing at the University of Oregon.

== Career ==
=== Early career ===
Paul Perry went on to become Executive Editor at American Health magazine.

In 1981, Perry went to China with author Ken Kesey to cover the First International Beijing Marathon for Runner's World magazine, for which he was an editor. Perry collaborated with Ken Babbs to produce On the Bus: The Complete Guide to the Legendary Bus Trip of Ken Kesey and the Merry Pranksters and the Birth of the Counterculture. The book is a photo documentary of the Acid Trip that tells the story of the birth of the psychedelic era through interviews with Allen Ginsberg, Timothy Leary, members of the Grateful Dead, and others.

Perry followed with Fear and Loathing: The Strange and Terrible Saga of Hunter S. Thompson, a biography of the famous Gonzo journalist. Much of the biography was based on several months spent together working on The Curse of Lono, a book that sprang from an article on the Honolulu Marathon published in Running, a magazine edited by Perry.

=== Near-death studies and further writing ===
In 1986, Perry's interest in the effects and meaning of near-death experiences led him to a professional involvement with Raymond Moody, M.D., Ph.D., The two have written seven books together (Paranormal, Glimpses of Eternity, The Light Beyond, Coming Back, Reunions, Paranormal, and Proof of Life After Life: 7 Reasons to Believe There Is an Afterlife.) He co-authored with Jeffrey Long, MD Evidence of the Afterlife and God And The Afterlife. In total, he has written or co-written 16 books on the subject of near-death experiences.

In 2001, only weeks after the 9/11 attack on the World Trade Center in New York, Perry went to Egypt to follow the trail of Jesus in Egypt. This is a trail that follows ancient sites and artifacts and is believed by Christians and Muslims alike to be the route followed by the Holy Family as they fled from the soldiers of King Herod. Perry wrote Jesus in Egypt upon his return

=== Documentary films ===
When his book Jesus in Egypt was published, a television producer approached Perry and offered to fund a documentary film of the Egypt journey. Perry returned to Egypt with a camera crew in 2004 and followed the trail a second time to make a documentary film. The film, Jesus, the Lost Years was premiered at the Cairo Opera House in 2005 to members of the Mubarak family and more than 1500 others, including Egyptian cabinet members, ambassadors, and Saudi princes.

The film was released in the Middle East under the alternative title: The Holy Family in Egypt.

The making of Jesus, the Lost Years led Perry to start a documentary film production company, Sakkara Productions, which is named after the first stone pyramid. He also started a second film production company, Paul Perry Productions.

== Filmography ==
AFTERLIFE, tackles the fascinating subject of near-death experiences and interviews scientists who have researched proof of life after death. It also features a number of people who have died and returned to tell stories of what they experienced on the brink of death.

"Dali's Greatest Secret," about a secret painting by artist Salvador Dalí that changed his life yet was hidden underneath a nun's bed for nearly 30 years. "The Secret Mummies of Lisbon," explored the excavation of 78 mummies concealed and forgotten in a Lisbon church. The expedition shed light on life in early Portugal.n.

"Secrets and Lies of Christopher Columbus," to be released in 2019, claims that explorer Christopher Columbus was not Italian but the illegitimate child of Portuguese royalty whose mother was Jewish and father a Duke. The movie claims to reveal new evidence that he was a secret agent for King John II of Portugal, who helped convince the pope to rearrange the map of the world, giving Portugal claim to Brazil, a country they had secretly discovered. The movie includes interviews with the Duke of Braganza, Christopher Columbus XX, Vasco da Gama XIX, historians, and Dr. Jose Lorenta.

== Honours ==
In September 2011, Perry was Knighted in Portugal by the Duke of Braganza for his film and book work. He is the official filmmaker of the Portuguese Royal House where he is also a Grand Cross knight. Perry was also made a Knight Commander in Santiago, Spain, by the Bishop of Sao Tome, a Brotherhood that stems from the ancient Order of Saint James, the oldest order of knighthood on the Iberian Peninsula.

- Royal House of Portugal: Knight Commander of the Order of Saint Michael of the Wing (September 2011)

== Personal life ==
Perry is married to Darlene Perry and has three children.
