= Saved by the Light (film) =

1995 American TV film by Lewis Teague

- Genre: Drama
- Based on: Saved by the Light by Dannion Brinkley; Paul Perry
- Screenplay by: John M. Mandel
- Directed by: Lewis Teague
- Starring: Eric Roberts
- Music by: Patrick Williams
- Country of origin: United States
- Original language: English

Production
- Executive producer: Ron Ziskin
- Producer: Ken Raskoff
- Cinematography: Alan Caso
- Editor: Tina Hirsch
- Running time: 120 minutes
- Production company: Four Point Entertainment

Original release
- Network: Fox
- Release: December 12, 1995

Saved by the Light is a 1995 American biographical television film directed by Lewis Teague and written by John Mandel. It stars Eric Roberts as Dannion Brinkley, a former bully who turns his life around after having a near-death experience. It is based on Brinkley's book of the same name. It aired on Fox on December 12, 1995.

== Plot ==
The movie begins in Aiken, South Carolina in 1975. Dannion Brinkley is a Vietnam veteran who works as a deliveryman in his parents store. A young man with a dark side, he is unfaithful to his loving wife Casey and bullies everyone else around him, even the residents of a retirement home. His mother expresses disgust with him after he beats up a poor man who shoplifted some items from their store. She tells him she thought she raised him with a heart and that his rage is like a terrible sickness. The angry young man's life takes a dramatic turn when he is struck by lightning while talking on the phone . Pronounced dead at the hospital, he miraculously revives and takes an amazing trip to the other side between life and death. A being of light tells him that love makes a difference and shows Dannion the effects that his rage has had on those he hurt from those he bullied on the playground to those he fought in Vietnam. The voice tells him to look at a future without hope and Dannion is shown a collage of images involving natural disasters, famine, poverty and war (footage from the Gulf War is incorporated). The voice tells him this bleak future need not be. The near death experience has a transformative effect on Dannion and he tries to make amends with his parents, wife and the others he has made suffer. He treats the man he had previously beaten up for shoplifting to dinner. Brinkley strikes up a friendship with "near death" expert Doctor Raymond Moody who tries to help him understand his experience. While helping a woman escape her abusive husband, Dannion injures his hand resulting in a catastrophic infection that damages his heart. The doctors tell him it is a matter of life and death but he has no fear of returning. Doctor Moody convinces him he is still needed on earth and Dannion agrees to the operation. He has another near death experience on the table and sees how he has loved and helped others in his new life. He has a beautiful vision of seeing his dead mother reunited in Heaven with her little sister. In the end, Brinkley is shown speaking his message to others and admitting that he is a most unlikely messenger.

== Cast ==
- Eric Roberts as Dannion Brinkley
- Lynette Walden as Casey Brinkley
- K Callan as Marion
- Donald Patrick Harvey as T. M.
- Ted Manson as Brink
- Don McManus as Raymond Moody
- Amber Elias as Julie Weldon
- Chris Nelson Norris as Bob Weldon

== Production ==
Shooting took place in Jacksonville, Florida.

== Release ==
Saved by the Light aired December 12, 1995, on Fox. It was released on video in 1998.

== Reception ==
Todd Everett of Variety wrote, "In a more perfect world, X-Files agents Mulder and Scully would come down from D.C. and rip the lid off this shoddy enterprise." Denise Lanctot of Entertainment Weekly rated it B+ and called it a "a nicely life-affirming New Age mystery" despite the corny visuals. Ray Richmond of the Los Angeles Daily News rated it C and wrote, "While the film sports some nifty visuals, it's mostly a tale of an annoying multiple personality who evolves from scary to really scary." Nathan Rabin of The A.V. Club called it an "odd mixture of low-key inspirational drama and minimalist science-fiction thriller" that does not do anything with its interesting premise. TV Guide rated it 2/5 stars and wrote, "Saved by the Light boasts an interesting concept that unfortunately can't be saved from weak direction and a tepid plot line." Maj Canton of Radio Times rated it 1/5 stars and wrote, "Cheap production values and an uninspired performance by Roberts relegate this film to the don't-waste-your-time list."
