= Closer to the Light =

Near-Death Experiences of Children

Closer to the Light: Learning from the Near-Death Experiences of Children
- Authors: Melvin L. Morse, Paul Perry
- Publisher: Ivy Books
- ISBN: 9780804108324

Closer to the Light: Learning from the Near-Death Experiences of Children is a 1991 nonfiction book written by Melvin L. Morse and Paul Perry with foreword written by Raymond Moody. The book documented the near-death experiences (NDEs) of 26 children and became a New York Times bestseller.

== Summary ==
Closer to the Light documents real-life accounts of near-death experiences in children. Morse had previously theorized that near-death experiences came from drugs administered during attempts to save someone's life. He conducted a study to determine which drugs caused such experiences but abandoned it after what he believes were credible reports of near death experiences. The results of the study were first published in 1986 in the American Journal of Disease in Children, with Closer to the Light documenting the study and other accounts of near death experiences in children in 1991.

== Reception ==
The book was reviewed by Stuart W Twemlow in 1991 in the Journal of Near-Death Studies. His view is that a scientifically 'suspect' subject had been well covered and written up in plain language by Morse, whom he praises as 'empathic'.

Others who have referred to the book have examined the overall validity of NDEs as evidence of survival after bodily death. Susan J. Blackmore in her chapter 'Near-death experiences' in The Skeptic Encyclopedia of Pseudoscience discusses various alternative explanations for these experiences, including expectation, administered drugs, endorphins, anoxia (oxygen depletion) or hypercarbia (excess carbon dioxide) and temporal lobe stimulation. Both anoxia and hypercarbia are likely to induce at least some of the elements of an NDE, such as the 'light at the end of a tunnel' and the 'out-of-body' experiences. Hypercarbia has long been known to induce strange effects such as seeing lights, visions, disconnection from the body and apparently mystical experiences. Blackmore concludes that temporal lobe stimulation due to anoxia and changes in the limbic system may also account for much of the classical near-death-experience. In closing the chapter she says that the NDE deserves serious research, not to prove survival beyond death but to help in the acceptance of death and tell us more about ourselves.
