= August 1975 =

Month of 1975

<<	August 1975					>>
Su	Mo	Tu	We	Th	Fr	Sa
					1	2
3	4	5	6	7	8	9
10	11	12	13	14	15	16
17	18	19	20	21	22	23
24	25	26	27	28	29	30
31

The following events occurred in August 1975:

== August 1, 1975 (Friday) ==
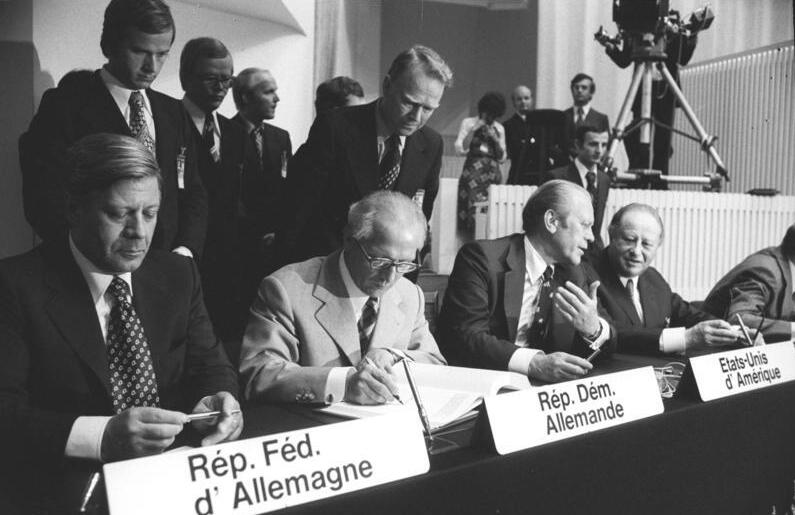
August 1, 1975: Helsinki Accords signed by world's leaders

- The Helsinki Accords, recognizing Europe's national borders and respect for human rights, were signed by the leaders of 35 nations in Finland, including the 15 member states of NATO and the 7 Warsaw Pact nations. Among other things, the agreement conceded the legality of the Soviet Union's annexation of the Baltic nations of Latvia, Lithuania and Estonia, but also provided the first mechanism for holding the Communist nations to commitments toward human rights, and was later cited by Václav Havel as a key to the success of liberating Eastern Europe in 1989.
- The Satellite Instructional Television Experiment commenced in India, bringing television for the first time to 2,500 villages in six Indian states and territories, in a project conducted by the Indian Space Research Organisation (ISRO) and NASA with the ATS-6 satellite. It would operate until July 31, 1976.

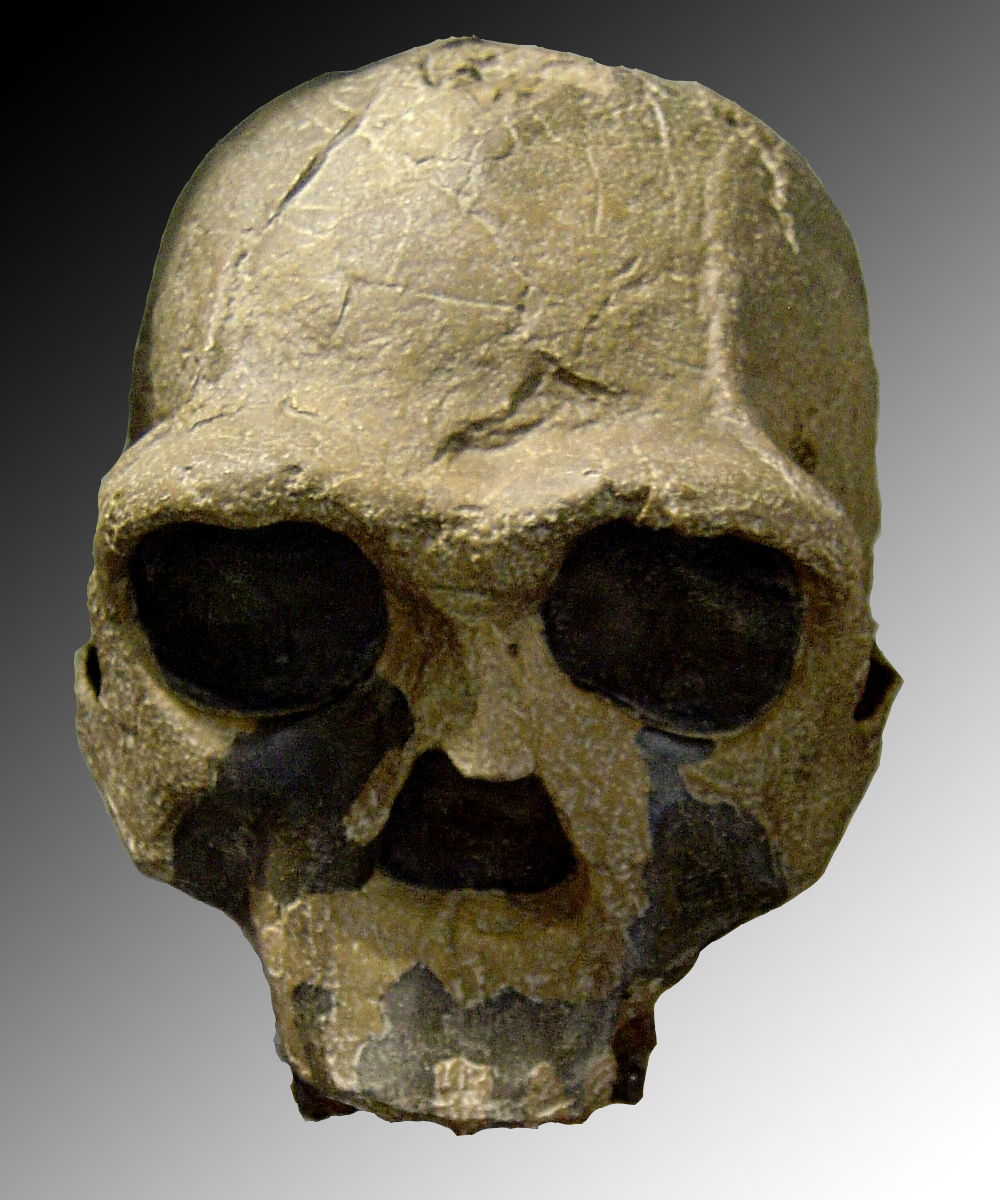
Ms. KNM ER 3733

- The skull of "KNM ER 3733", a woman of the species Homo ergaster, was discovered by Bernard Ngeneo, 1,750,000 years after her death, at the Koobi Fora Ridge near Lake Turkana in Kenya. By August 9, the nearly intact skull had been carefully unearthed.
- The Republic of Cabinda unilaterally declared independence.

== August 2, 1975 (Saturday) ==
- The highest temperatures ever recorded in Massachusetts (107 °F at New Bedford) and Rhode Island (104 °F at Providence) took place during a heatwave in northeast United States.
- Carrying U.S. President Ford on his departure from the Helsinki summit, Air Force One strayed from its flight plan and veered into restricted air space near Swedish military installations, prompting the Swedish Air Force to send a J35 Draken to intercept the jet and turn it away. Major Carl-Christen Hjort said that the fighter was equipped with air-to-air missiles, "but, of course, there were no plans to use them".
- Billy Martin had his first game as manager of baseball's New York Yankees for owner George Steinbrenner being hired and fired several times between 1975 and 1988. In his outing, he guided the Yankees to a 5–4 "home" win over the Cleveland Indians. The team was still playing at Shea Stadium as their own stadium was undergoing renovations until the 1976 season.

== August 3, 1975 (Sunday) ==
- Less than four weeks after becoming the first President of the Comoros, Ahmed Abdallah was overthrown in a bloodless coup. Foreign mercenaries, sponsored by French soldier of fortune Bob Denard, seized the lone radio station and television station in Moroni, the capital city. An hour later, opposition leader Ali Soilih announced that he was the new President. Solih would place Said Mohamed Jaffar in the office of president, before assuming the job himself in January.
- A chartered ALIA, Royal Jordanian Airlines Boeing 707 crashed into the side of a mountain while attempting to land at Agadir after departing Paris three hours earlier. All but four of the passengers were Moroccans who worked in France and were coming home on their vacations. All 188 people on the jet were killed.
- A0620-00, the first x-ray nova to also be visible on an optical telescope (designated V616 Mon), was seen and detected to flare. After eight months, the flare diminished, and the object is considered to be likely to be a black hole that was created around the time of the 10th century BCE based on its distance from earth of an estimated 3,000 light years.
- The Louisiana Superdome opened in New Orleans.
- Died: Jack Molinas, 43, gambler and former college and professional basketball player convicted for "fixing" games, was shot and killed while standing in his backyard at his home in Hollywood Hills, California, in what was believed to have been a mob hit. The gunman, Eugene Conner, was convicted of murder in 1978 after being turned in by his own brother.

== August 4, 1975 (Monday) ==
- Members of the Japanese Red Army terrorist group fought their way into the American consulate in Kuala Lumpur, Malaysia, then took 52 hostages, only five of whom were American. The group demanded the release of 7 jailed Red Army members. Five of the JRA prisoners accepted the offer of safe passage and were flown to Libya.

== August 5, 1975 (Tuesday) ==
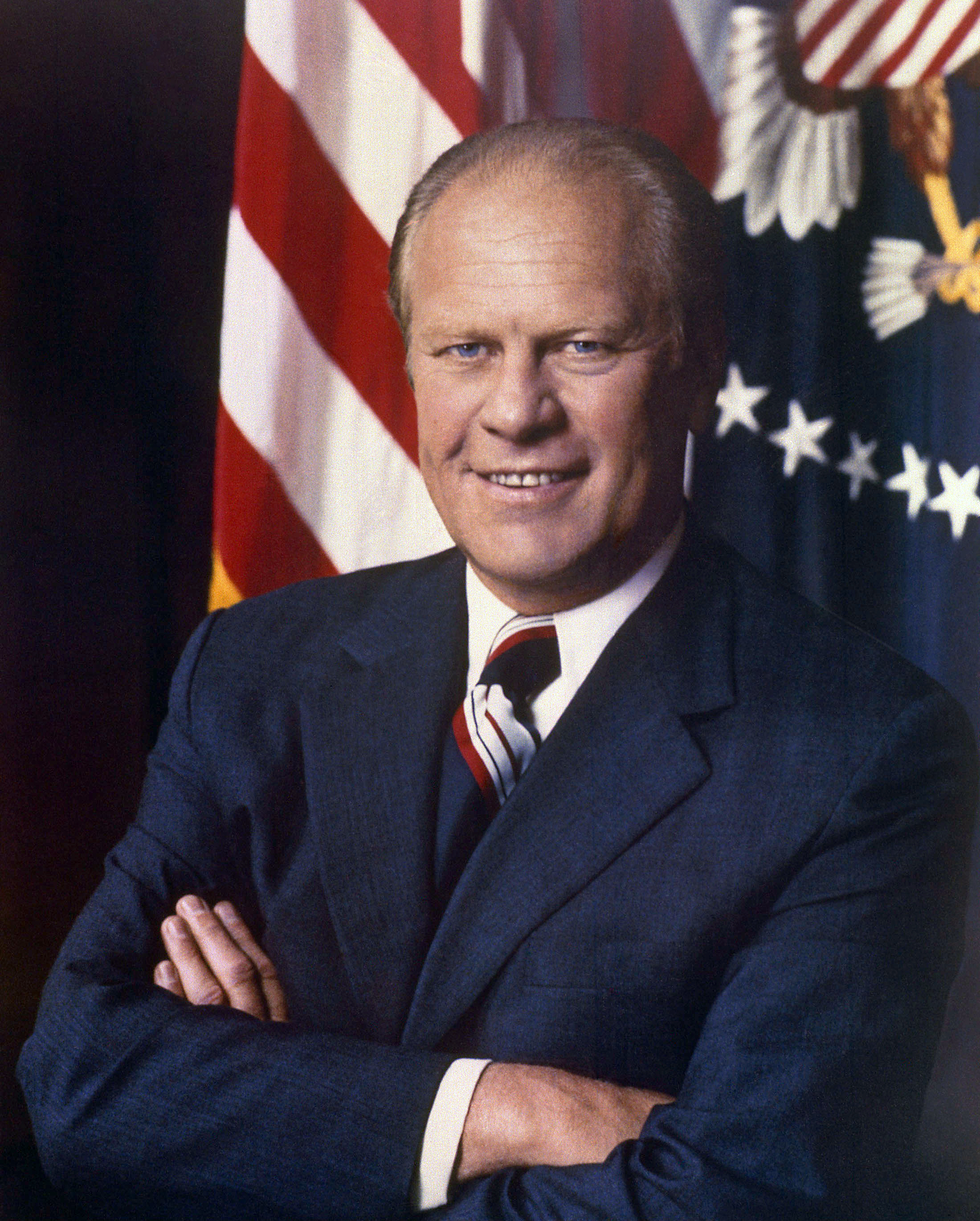
U.S. President Ford

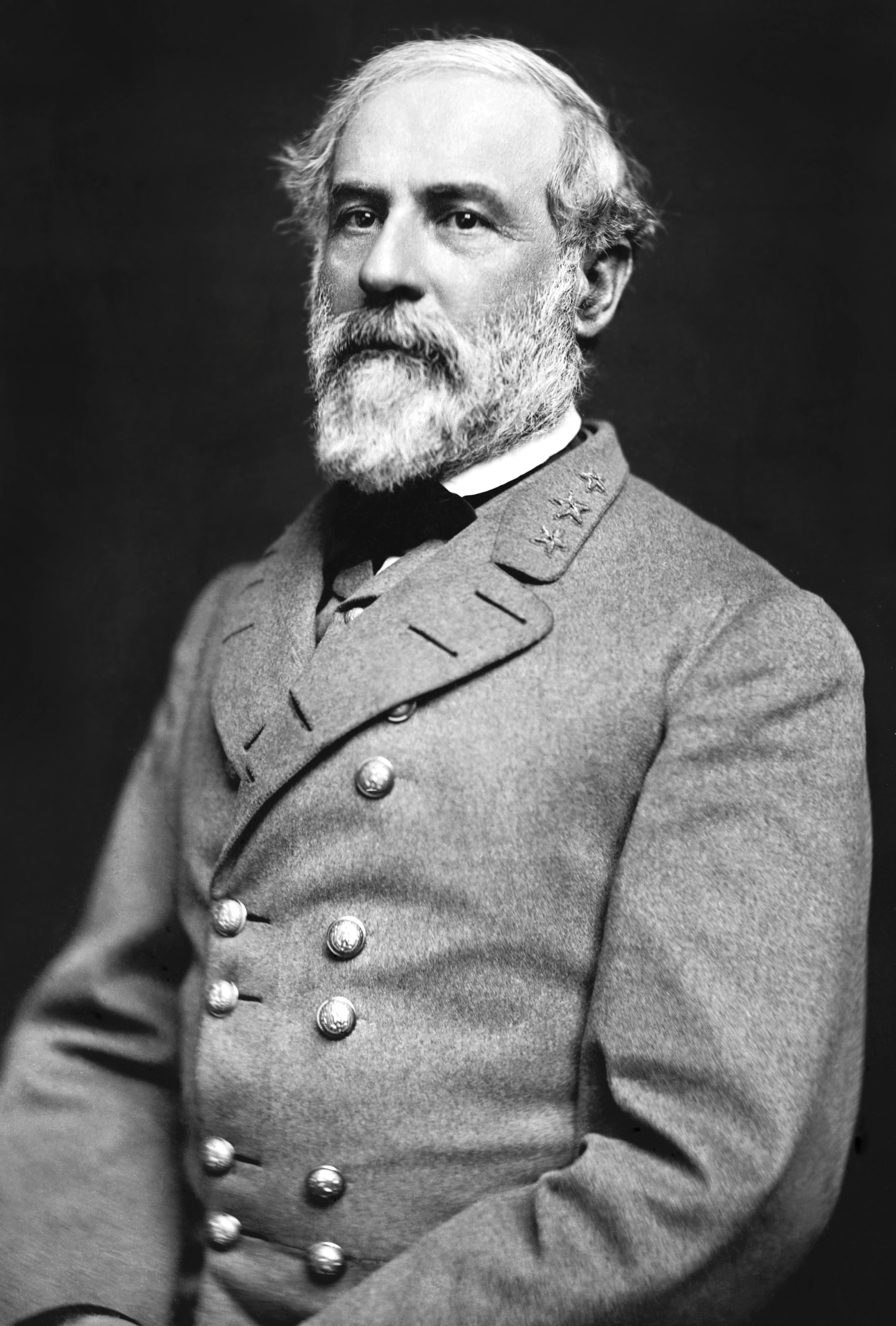
U.S. citizen and CSA General Lee

- U.S. President Ford signed into law a U.S. Senate resolution posthumously restoring the American citizenship of Confederate Army General Robert E. Lee, restoring his American citizenship. Lee had died in 1870, but had signed an oath of allegiance in 1865 as part of being granted amnesty. "Although more than a century late," President Ford said, "I am delighted to sign this resolution and to complete the full restoration of General Lee's citizenship."
- The Parliament of India retroactively changed the 1971 election law that Prime Minister Indira Gandhi had violated four years earlier while running for her seat in the Lok Sabha. Gandhi had been convicted on June 12 of violating campaign laws, with a mandatory penalty of being barred from public office for six years, then declared an emergency. Most citizens of India were unaware of the rewriting of the law because of censorship of the press.
- South African troops drove ten miles into Angola, resulting in a decision by Cuba to increase its presence in the African nation.
- An armored car of the Hang Seng Bank was robbed of 75 million Hong Kong dollars, equivalent to USD $10,000,000.
- Born: Kajol (Kajol Devgan), Indian film actress and five-time winner of Filmfare Award for Best Actress; as Kajol Mukherjee in Mumbai

== August 6, 1975 (Wednesday) ==
- The United Nations Security Council declined to approve South Korea's application for membership. The United States would veto the application of North Vietnam and South Vietnam a week later.
- One day before it was to expire, the U.S. Voting Rights Act of 1965 was extended for another ten years. The Act of 1975 had passed the U.S. House of Representatives 341-70 on June 4, 1975, and the U.S. Senate 77-12 on July 24.
- The death of Hercule Poirot was announced worldwide by the publishers of Agatha Christie's novel Curtain.
- The Presidium of the Supreme Soviet unanimously approved the Helsinki Accords, and a resolution praying "that all countries represented at the conference will live up to the agreements reached. As to the Soviet Union, it will act precisely in this way."

== August 7, 1975 (Thursday) ==
- Typhoon Nina produced the heaviest one-day rainfall ever recorded from a Pacific Ocean typhoon, with 97 centimeters (38 inches) at Linzhang County in the Hebei Province. The typhoon itself had killed 12 people up to that point, in Taiwan, but the downpour continued for 26 hours, leading to a dam burst in mainland China the next day.
- Alger Hiss was sworn back in as an attorney, 23 years after having been disbarred in 1952 for perjury, after denying that he had given U.S. State Department documents, nicknamed the "Pumpkin Papers", to Communist spy Whittaker Chambers.
- Born:
  - Charlize Theron, South African-born American actress, 2004 Academy Award winner for Best Actress for portrayal of serial killer Aileen Wuornos in the film Monster, in Benoni, Gauteng
  - David Hicks, Australian man imprisoned by the United States at Guantanamo Bay from 2001 to 2007 while awaiting trial on charges of supporting terrorism in Afghanistan; in Adelaide

== August 8, 1975 (Friday) ==
- The Banqiao Dam, in China's Henan Province, failed after a freak typhoon, drowning over 26,000 people and leading to famine and disease that killed 145,000 more. At 12:30 am local time, the Shimantan Dam, on the Ru River, gave way from a downpour; thirty minutes later, the pressure caused the Banqiao dam to burst, and 62 more dams further downstream failed as well. A large wave, at least 3 meters (nearly 10 feet) high, swept through the valley rendering eleven million people homeless. The People's Republic of China would not acknowledge the disaster until 30 years later.
- Singer Hank Williams Jr. was seriously injured in a near-fatal mountain climbing accident at Ajax Peak in Montana, when the ground beneath him gave way, and fell 500 feet down the slope. After two years of reconstructive surgeries, Williams would set about rebuilding his career and become one of the best-selling country music artists in history.
- Died: Cannonball Adderley, 46, former high school music teacher who became a contemporary jazz artist

== August 9, 1975 (Saturday) ==
- The COS-B satellite, a project of the European Space Research Organisation (ESRO), was launched from Vandenberg Air Force Base in California. "It is difficult to overestimate the importance of COS-B in the historical evolution" of ESRO, it would be written later. Operating five years longer than expected, up until April 25, 1982, the European mission provided the first detailed view of gamma ray sources in the Milky Way.
- Samuel Bronfman II, son of the president of Seagram's, was reported kidnapped and held for ransom after disappearing from his home in Purchase, New York. After the ransom was paid, Bronfman was located August 17 by the FBI and by the New York Police Department. Defendants Mel Patrick Lynch and Dominic Byrne would later persuade a jury that Bronfman was their accomplice, and would be acquitted of kidnapping charges, and convicted only of extortion of the Bronfman family. Byrne's attorney wrote a memoir before his death in 2020, confessing that the defense was a lie, and Bronfman had been an innocent victim.
- Planning began to move the capital of Nigeria from Lagos to a new location. A committee, headed by Akinola Aguda, would select a site for the Federal Capital Territory to be made up of part of the states of Nasarawa, Niger and Kogi, for the building of the new city of Abuja.
- Mark Donohue set the world record for speed on a closed race course, averaging 221.120 miles per hour while driving a Porsche 917.30 at the Talladega Motor Speedway in Talladega, Alabama. The record would stand for 11 years, but Donohue would be killed in a racing accident ten days later.
- Hours after their birth, two baby girls, born as Siamese twins, were separated by a team of 25 surgeons, anesthetists and nurses, led by Dr. Peter Jones at the Royal Children's Hospital in Melbourne.
- Died: Dmitri Shostakovich, 68, Russian composer

== August 10, 1975 (Sunday) ==
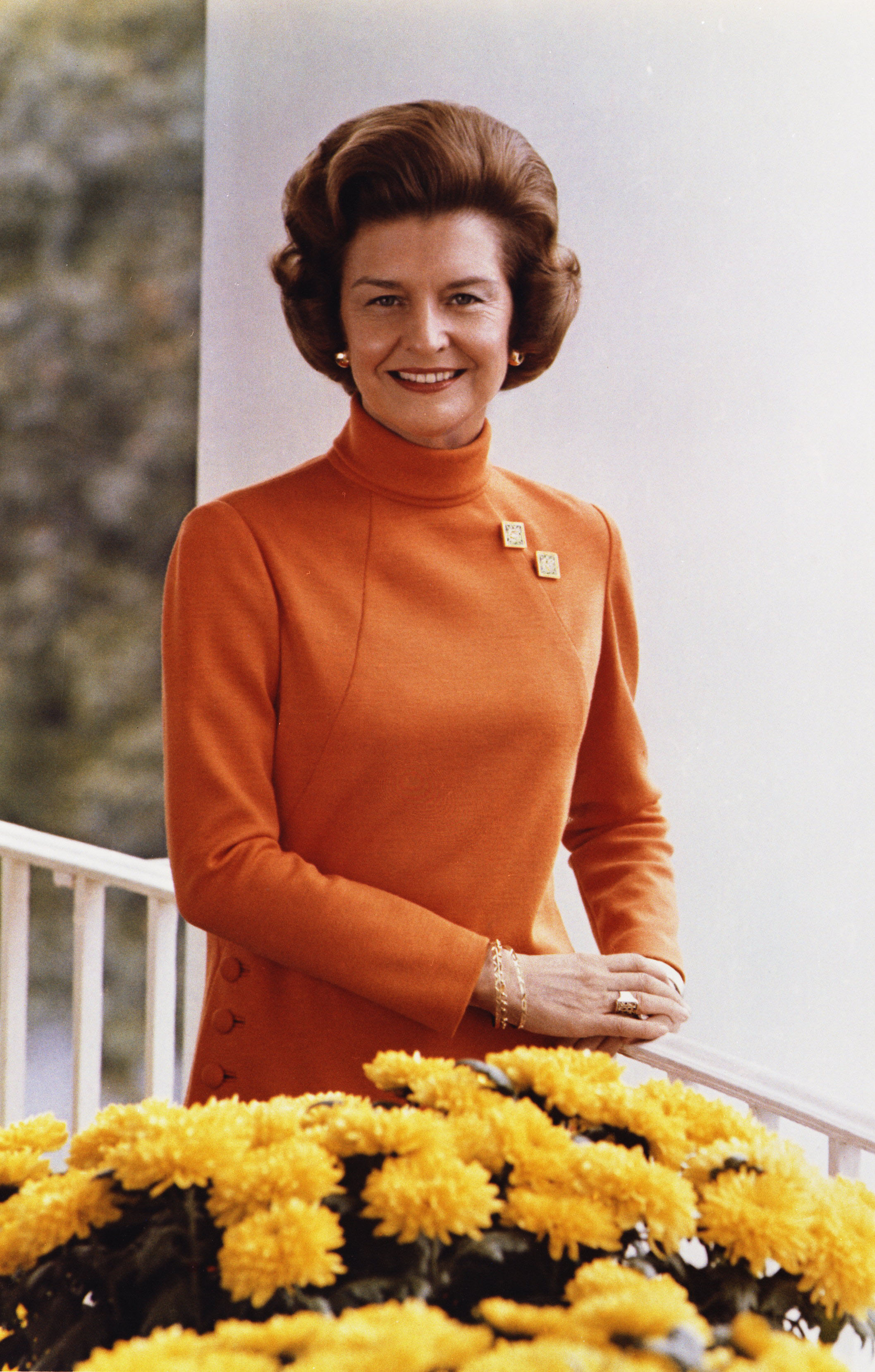
Betty Ford

- An interview with U.S. First Lady Betty Ford was broadcast on the popular news show 60 Minutes. Taking questions from Morley Safer, President Ford's wife gave surprisingly candid answers, noting that she "wouldn't be surprised" if her daughter was "having an affair" (referring to premarital sex) and that marijuana was "the type of thing young people have to experience". In the opinion of historian Nigel Hamilton, "alcohol certainly loosened her tongue when she gave what would become a famed interview...No First Lady had ever spoken so candidly on national television, sending moralists of both parties into a tailspin."
- Former U.S. President Richard M. Nixon signed a contract with British TV journalist David Frost, agreeing to answer any questions posed in four sessions of 90 minutes apiece. In return, Nixon would receive $700,000. The meetings would later be the subject of the film Frost/Nixon.
- As Indira Gandhi's exercise of "emergency rule" over India continued, the Thirty-ninth Amendment of the Constitution of India took effect, prohibiting civil lawsuits or criminal charges from being brought against an incumbent Prime Minister of India. The new rule brought to an end the June decision that had threatened to bar Gandhi from public office.

== August 11, 1975 (Monday) ==
- British Leyland Motor Corporation, the United Kingdom's largest auto manufacturer, came under 78 percent control of the British government.
- The UDT carried out a coup in the Portuguese colony at East Timor, which was in the process of being granted eventual independence from Portugal, beginning a civil war between UDT and a rival independence group, Fretilin. In the civil war that followed, the UDT troops and thousands of refugees were forced, by a counterattack from Fretilin, to flee across the border to Indonesia, but not before their leaders signed a document asking for East Timor to be annexed by Indonesia.
- Resolutions to admit North Vietnam and the Communist South Vietnam to the United Nations were vetoed in the Security Council by the United States. The Council had recommended submitting the resolutions to the U.N. General Assembly by a 13–1 margin, with the U.S. against and Costa Rica abstaining.
- Died:
  - Anthony C. McAuliffe, 77, American general famous for answering a German surrender demand at the Battle of the Bulge with the written reply "Nuts!". The U.S. 101st Airborne Division was able to hold out against the German attack for a week until relieved by other American units.
  - Rachel Katznelson-Shazar, 90, Zionist political figure and wife of third President of Israel

== August 12, 1975 (Tuesday) ==
- John Walker of New Zealand became the first person to run a mile in less than 3 minutes and 50 seconds, clocking in at 3:49.4 in a meet a Gothenburg in Sweden.
- Died: Laurance Labadie, 77, American anarchist and author of Anarchism Applied to Economics, and Origin and Nature of Government

== August 13, 1975 (Wednesday) ==
- South Korean serial killer Kim Dae-doo murdered 63-year old Ahn Jong-hyun and injured Ahn's wife, beginning a 55-day spree of killing that would not end until his arrest on October 8, 1975. Over a period of eight weeks, Kim murdered 17 victims ranging in age from an infant to a 70-year-old man, including 14 during the month of September. His final victim was a 26-year-old man, Hong Jin-man.
- A group of 33 Libyan Army officers attempted to overthrow the government of Muammar Gaddafi and his ruling Revolutionary Command Council, in the first major coup attempt since Gaddafi took power in 1969. The coup failed and the officers would be publicly executed in 1977.
- A terrorist attack by the Provisional IRA Belfast Brigade on the Bayardo Bar, a popular pub in Belfast, Northern Ireland, killed five people and injured 50. Two people outside were killed first, and a bomb placed inside the bar exploded and collapsed the building. Brendan "Bik" McFarlane was arrested 20 minutes later, along with Peter Hamilton and Seamus Clarke. Sentenced to life imprisonment, McFarlane would later coordinate the 1981 Irish hunger strike at Maze Prison, and lead the successful 1983 Maze Prison escape.

== August 14, 1975 (Thursday) ==
- The government of the Philippines and the rebel Moro Liberation Front signed a cease fire agreement after five years of fighting. The Front would repudiate the agreement on September 11, and fighting would continue until 1986.
- Portugal resumed its colonial administration of Angola, but pledged to abide by the scheduled November 11 independence date.

== August 15, 1975 (Friday) ==
- President Sheikh Mujibur Rahman of Bangladesh was assassinated at his residence in Dhaka, along with his wife, three of his sons, two daughters-in-law, and his brother, and 12 other people during a coup d'etat led by Major Syed Faruque Rahman. Khondaker Mostaq Ahmad, Mujibur's Commerce Minister, became the new President. The original six conspirators, all military officers, had met on August 6 and were soon joined by others, and the decision was made to act before September 1, when the nation's district governors would be given control over the police and armed forces. At dawn, the group struck. Nearly 35 years later, on January 28, 2010, five of the coup leaders would be hanged after their convictions in 1998, including Syed Faruque, and the man who actually shot President Mujibur, Major Bazlul Huda.
- The Hindi language action-adventure film Sholay, which set a record for highest-grossing film in India that stood for almost 20 years, was first seen in theaters. Directed by Ramesh Sippy and starring Sanjeev Kumar, Dharmendra Krishan, Amitabh Bachchan and Hema Malini, the film was initially rejected by critics but sold 250,000,000 tickets worldwide and grossed 350 million Indian rupees in ticket sales.
- The Birmingham Six – Hugh Callaghan, Paddy Joe Hill, Gerry Hunter, Richard McIlkenny, Billy Power and Johnny Walker- were sentenced to life imprisonment in Great Britain, after being wrongfully convicted of the murder of 21 people in the bombings of the Mulberry Bush pub and the Talk of the Town Pub in Birmingham on November 21, 1974. After a 16-year campaign that would show that the police coerced their confessions and mishandled evidence, their convictions would be overturned in 1991.
- Born:
  - Kara Wolters, American women's pro basketball player and inductee into the Women's Basketball Hall of Fame, 1997 women's college basketball player of the year and Olympic gold medalist (2000); nicknamed "Big Girl" because of her stature (6'7" or 2.01m) as one of the tallest women basketball players; in Holliston, Massachusetts
  - Yoshikatsu Kawaguchi, Japanese soccer football goalkeeper with 116 appearances for the national team; in Fuji, Shizuoka Prefecture
- Died: Joseph Tommasi, 24, American white supremacist, neo-Nazi and founder of the National Socialist Liberation Front, was shot and killed while in front of the offices of the rival National Socialist White People's Party in El Monte, California.

== August 16, 1975 (Saturday) ==
- Serial killer Ted Bundy was arrested by Salt Lake County police sergeant Bob Hayward after fleeing when Hayward approached Bundy's Volkswagen Beetle. In the search of the car, Hayward found burglary tools and a ski mask. Bundy would be identified as the kidnapper of Carol Da Roach and sentenced to 15 years in prison. Transferred to a jail in Colorado to stand trial for a murder there, he would escape in 1977 and committed three more murders.

== August 17, 1975 (Sunday) ==
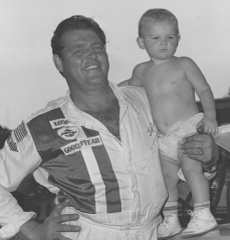
Lund with son

- Two auto racing legends were fatally injured on the same day, thousands of miles apart. Tiny Lund, who had won the 1963 Daytona 500, was killed in a six car pileup while competing in NASCAR's Talladega 500 car race in Alabama. Earlier in the day, Mark Donohue, who had set a world record at the same track a week earlier, was fatally injured during a final morning practice, hours before the Austrian Grand Prix, when a punctured tire caused his car to hurtle through a fence. Donohue walked away from the crash, complaining of a severe headache, then went into convulsions. Two days after undergoing emergency brain surgery at Graz, Donohue died of complications.
- Six firemen were killed and five others were injured while fighting a blaze at a Gulf Oil refinery in Philadelphia. Two of the company employees prevented further destruction by paddling a rowboat through a pool of hot crude oil and shutting off an open valve in a naphtha storage tank.
- Died:
  - Vladimir Kuts, 48, Soviet runner, gold medalist at the 1956 Olympics in the 5,000m and 10,000m events, died of an apparent suicide from an overdose of alcohol and sleeping pills.
  - Chang Chun-Ha, 56, South Korean publisher who had published the newspaper Sassanggye from 1953 until its shutdown in 1970, fell to his death while mountain climbing. The South Korean government said that Chang, who was known for his opposition to President Park Chung-hee, had lost his footing while descending a mountain near the city of Pocheon, but Park's opponents said that Chang had been murdered.
  - Sig Arno, 79, German-born character actor

== August 18, 1975 (Monday) ==
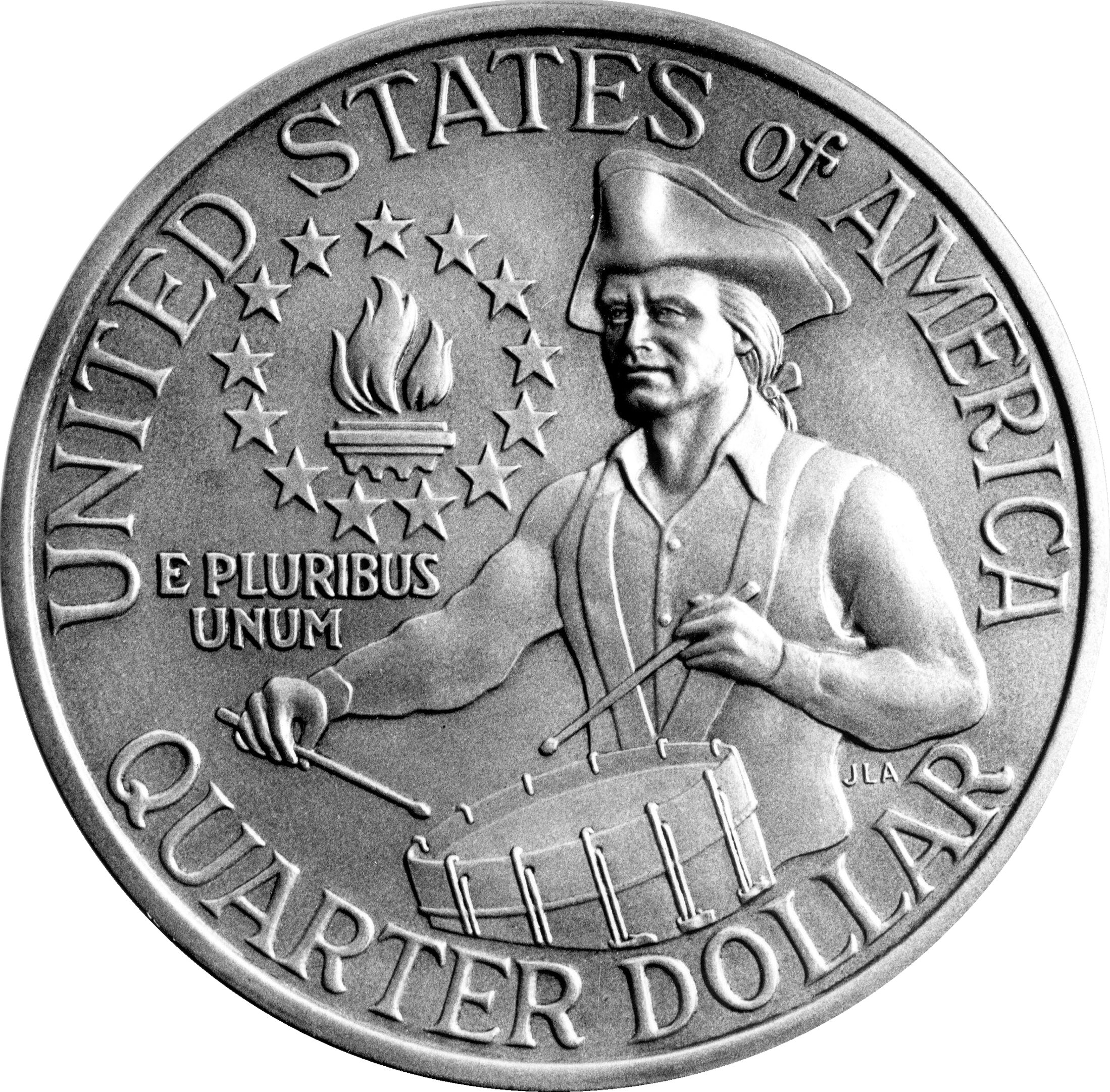
Bicentennial quarter dollar coin

- The Bicentennial quarter dollar coin was put into circulation in the United States. For one year, the image of the American eagle was replaced by one of an American Revolutionary War drummer boy. The image of George Washington remained the same, but the inscription "1776-1976" was put where "1976" would have gone. The coins entered general circulation starting on September 17, 1975.

== August 19, 1975 (Tuesday) ==
- The New York Times became the first major American newspaper to call attention to sexual harassment of female employees, in an article syndicated nationwide by The New York Times News Service. The Wall Street Journal would follow with an article in January.
- Died:
  - Ima Hogg, 94, American philanthropist and art collector
  - Mark Donohue, 38, American race car driver and 1972 Indianapolis 500 winner, following a racing accident at Österreichring racetrack in Spielberg bei Knittelfeld, Austria
  - Frank Shields, 65, American tennis player and International Tennis Hall of Fame inductee

== August 20, 1975 (Wednesday) ==
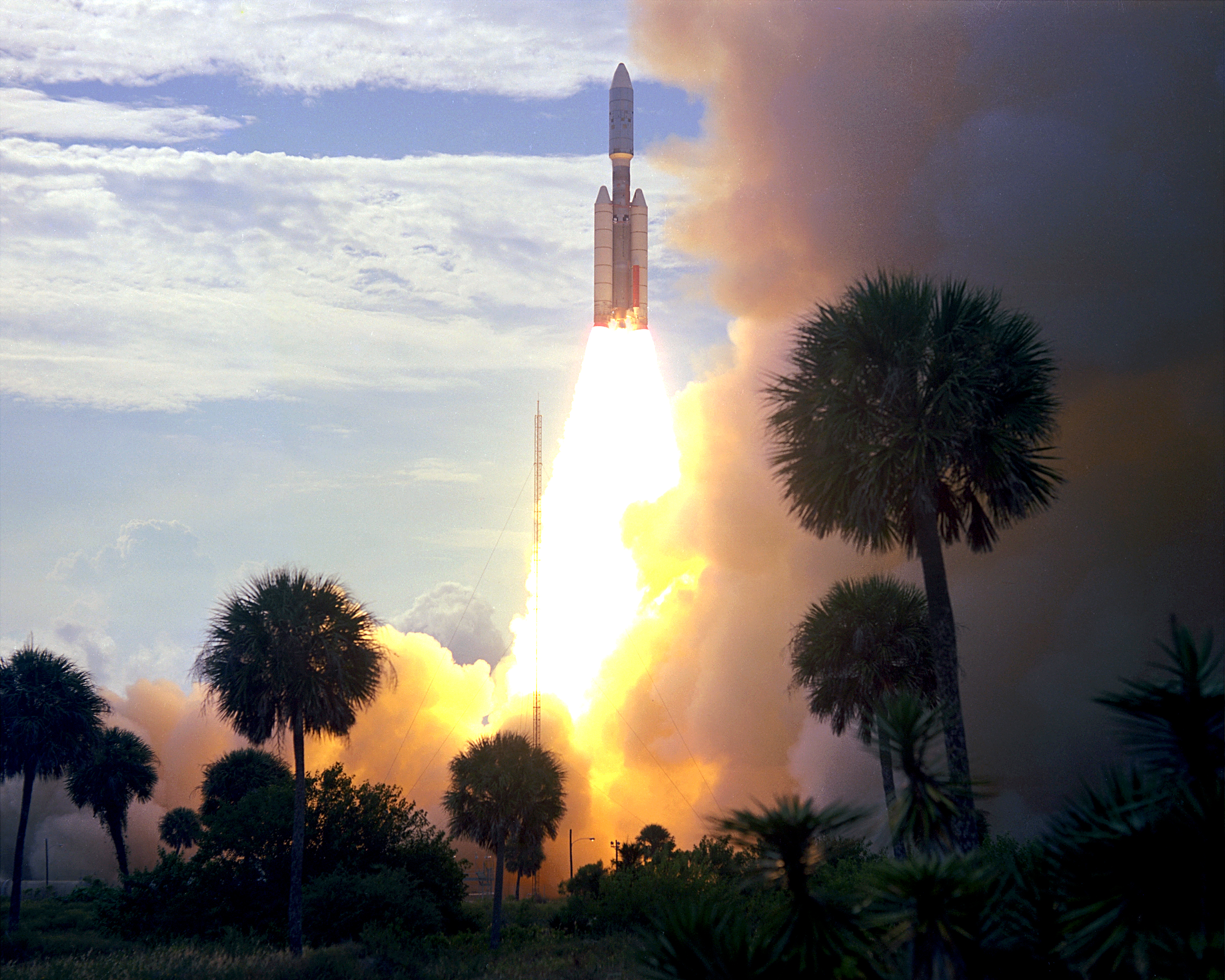
August 20, 1975: Viking 1 begins journey to Mars

- NASA launched the Viking 1 planetary probe toward Mars. Liftoff took place from Cape Canaveral at 5:22 pm local time. After a journey of ten months and 505 million miles, Viking would enter orbit around Mars on June 19, 1976, and the lander would reach the surface of Mars on July 20, sending back pictures and data until November 13, 1982.
- Czechoslovak State Airlines Flight 540, an Ilyushin-62 jet, crashed while attempting to land in Damascus, killing 126 of the 128 people aboard.

== August 21, 1975 (Thursday) ==
- The United States partially lifted its embargo against Cuba, allowing the foreign subsidiaries of American companies to trade directly with the Castro regime.
- Venezuela nationalized the oil industry there, with production facilities taken over by the state-owned company, Petróleos de Venezuela.
- Died: Sam McGee, 81, older of the country music duo The McGee Brothers, in a farming accident. A master guitarist who performed regularly at the Grand Ole Opry, McGee was cutting hay on his farm near Franklin, Tennessee, when he was run over by his tractor.

== August 22, 1975 (Friday) ==
- The destroyer ARA Santísima Trinidad, being outfitted as the most advanced ship of the Argentine Navy, was sunk in La Plata Harbor by bombs placed by the Montoneros terrorist group, causing $70,000,000 worth of damage. The ship would be restored and put into service in 1981.
- Serial killer Henry Lee Lucas was paroled after serving three years of a five-year sentence for attempted kidnapping, and began a killing spree along with his friend, Ottis Toole.
- John Patler, a sniper who had assassinated American Nazi leader George Lincoln Rockwell on August 25, 1967, was paroled after serving nearly eight years of his 20-year prison sentence.
- Died: Lancelot Hogben, 79, British scientist and author of books on science, mathematics and language.

== August 23, 1975 (Saturday) ==
- Laos became the third Indochinese nation to come under Communist Control in six months, as Vientiane, the nation's capital, welcomed the Pathet Lao guerillas. Prime Minister Souphanouvong, who led the Pathet Lao and a coalition government, pledged that King Sri Savang Vatthana would continue to reign.
- The Soviet Union detonated eight nuclear devices simultaneously in a single event, marking a new trend in multiple testing.
- Died:
  - Sidney Buchman, 73, blacklisted American screenwriter
  - Hank Patterson, 86, American TV actor (Fred Ziffel on Green Acres)

== August 24, 1975 (Sunday) ==
- Stylianos Pattakos, Nikolaos Makarezos, and former president George Papadopoulos, the three Greek Army colonels who had led the 1967 military coup in Greece, were sentenced to death after being convicted of treason and insurrection, while eight other defendants (including former president Demetrios Ioannidis) received life sentences, and seven others got terms ranging from 4 to 20 years. On August 25, the Greek cabinet voted to commute the sentences to life imprisonment.
- The North American Soccer League, the major professional soccer football league in North America, played its 8th championship, but the first to be called the "Soccer Bowl". In a match of two expansion teams playing their first seasons, the Tampa Bay Rowdies defeated the Portland Timbers, 2 to 0, with goals coming from Arsène Auguste of Haiti and Clyde Best of Bermuda.
- Ed Halicki of the San Francisco Giants Major League Baseball team pitched a no-hitter against the New York Mets; the Giants wouldn't win another no-hitter until 2009.
- Died: Charles Revson, 68, cosmetics manufacturer who founded the Revlon company.

== August 25, 1975 (Monday) ==
- In a luxury railroad car parked in the middle of the Victoria Falls Bridge, Ian Smith, the Prime Minister of Rhodesia and leader of the white minority government of the mostly black African nation, met with Bishop Abel Muzorewa of the black African National Council, to negotiate a peaceful solution to a threatened racial war. The bridge linked white ruled Rhodesia (later Zimbabwe) and the black ruled Zambia (formerly Northern Rhodesia). Earlier in the day, Prime Minister John Vorster of white-ruled South Africa met with Zambia's President Kenneth Kaunda at the Musi-o-Tunya Hotel at the Zambian town of Livingstone, later referred to as Maramba, with both leaders sponsoring the meeting between Smith and Muzorewa. However, the meeting was not successful.
- Bruce Springsteen's album Born to Run was released in the United States, becoming a hit and making Springsteen a rock superstar.

== August 26, 1975 (Tuesday) ==
- The Emir of Bahrain dissolved that nation's Constitutional Assembly, after a two-year experiment in parliamentary democracy, replacing the legislature with the prior system of the laws by decree of the Emir, with the advice and counsel of a cabinet of ministers of his choice. A bicameral legislature would be created in 2001.
- Bundelkhand University was created in Jhansi in the Indian state of Uttar Pradesh.

== August 27, 1975 (Wednesday) ==
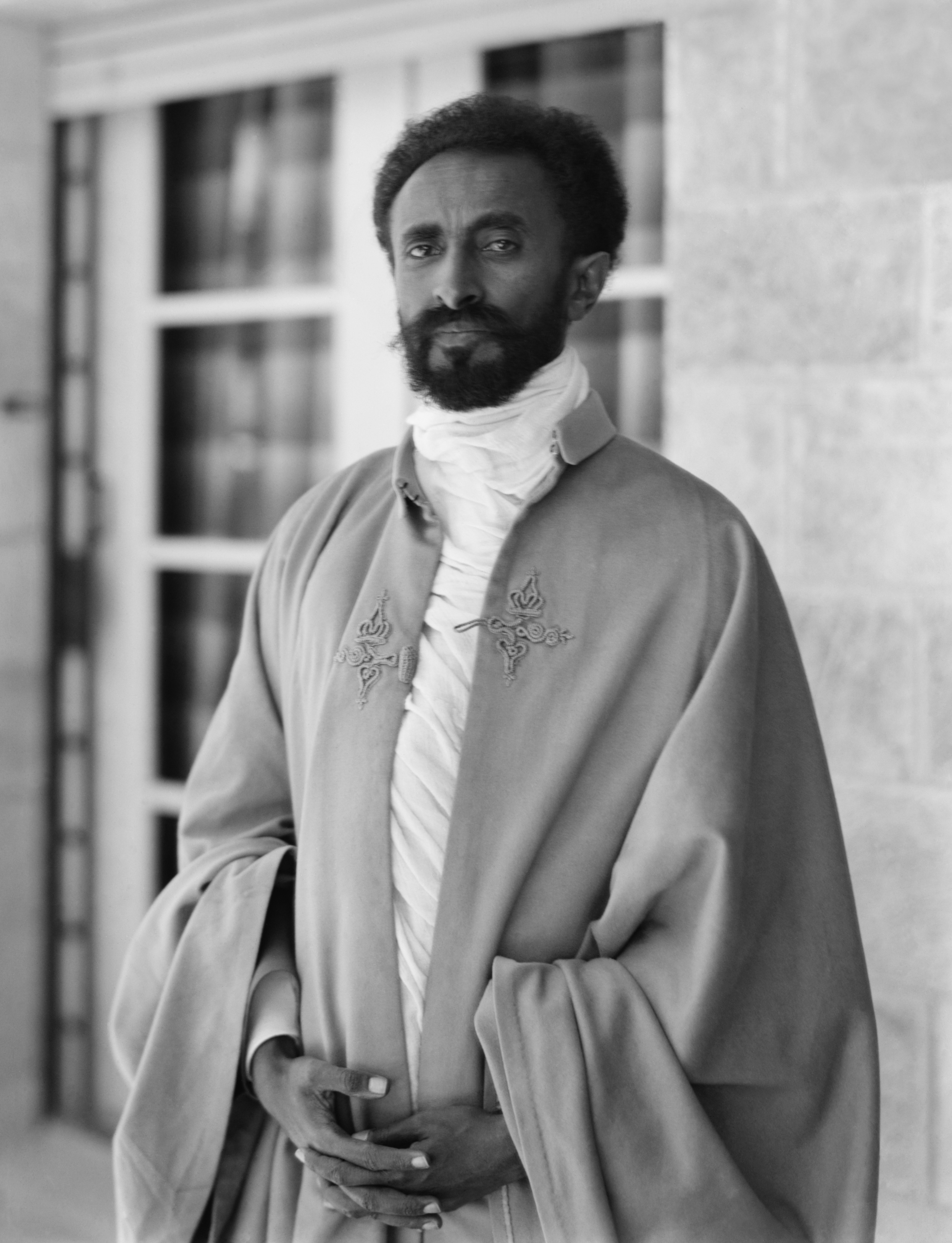
Ex-Emperor of Ethiopia, Haile Selassie

- The death of Haile Selassie I, the last Emperor of Ethiopia, was announced by the African republic's radio station. Officially, the 83-year-old deposed Emperor had been found dead in his palace, and had been in failing health after prostate surgery two months earlier, and he was buried in a "secret location" by orders of President Mengistu. After the overthrow of the Mengistu regime 16 years later, Selassie's body was unearthed from a grave beneath Mengistu's office at the former Imperial Palace, and it was revealed that the Emperor had been smothered with a pillow while sleeping, after he refused to provide information about his overseas bank accounts.
- The defendants in the 1970 shootings at Kent State University were acquitted of all responsibility for the May 4, 1970 killing of four students. Former Ohio Governor James A. Rhodes, former KSU President Robert I. White, and 27 members of the Ohio National Guard had been sued by the parents of the four students for $46 million.
- Governor Mário Lemos Pires of the colony of Portuguese Timor abandoned the capital Dili and departed by the freighter Macdili, along with 722 refugees, to the tiny nearby Atauro Island.
- The West German communications satellite Symphonie-B was launched into space from the United States.

== August 28, 1975 (Thursday) ==
- The U.S. Food and Drug Administration announced a ban on the use of polyvinyl chloride plastic for packaging of certain foods, because of its potential for causing cancer. At the time, PVC was the second most-used plastic in American food packaging. Although PVC film wrapping of meat and fruits was still permitted, the use of hard PVC plastic on lunch meat packages, and for bottles of liquids, was to be prohibited.
- The FBI released the first 725 of 48,000 pages of its files concerning Julius and Ethel Rosenberg, 22 years after the American couple's execution for treason. The materials were made available following a Freedom of Information Act request by Professor Allen Weinstein of Smith College.
- Died: Fritz Wotruba, 68, Austrian sculptor

== August 29, 1975 (Friday) ==
- Juan Velasco Alvarado was deposed as President of Peru by a military coup, after seven years of dictatorial rule. His prime minister, General Francisco Morales Bermudez, was installed as Velasco's successor.
- General Vasco Goncalves was fired as Prime Minister of Portugal by President Francisco da Costa Gomes.
- The nova V1500 Cygni was first observed on Earth, reaching a magnitude of 1.7 the next day, making it bright enough to be visible with the naked eye. It would remain visible for about a week. It was the second brightest nova of the 20th century, exceeded only by CP Puppis in 1942. The distance of the V1500 Cygni was calculated at 1.95 kiloparsecs (6,360 light years), so the nova occurred in roughly 4400 BC.
- Died:
  - Charles C. Bass, American physician and medical researcher (b. 1875)
  - Éamon de Valera, 92, Irish statesman who served as President of Ireland from 1959 to 1973, and as Prime Minister 1937–48, 1951–54 and 1957–59

== August 30, 1975 (Saturday) ==
- The Convention on the Prevention of Marine Pollution by Dumping of Wastes and Other Matter, sometimes called the London Convention of 1972, entered into force.
- At the Statler Hilton Hotel in New York City, the Libertarian Party held its second nominating convention, selecting Roger MacBride as its candidate for President of the United States in the 1976 election. After the 1972 election, MacBride, one of 12 Virginian Republicans in the Electoral College, broke ranks and cast one electoral vote for the Libertarian candidate, John Hospers.

== August 31, 1975 (Sunday) ==
- The largest robbery of bus passengers in history netted $35,000 worth of cash, coins and jewelry in what was described as "a 1975 version of a stagecoach holdup". Two armed bandits were among the 38 passengers on a Greyhound bus that was en route from Chicago to Toronto when the robbery took place near Detroit, taking an estimated $20,000 in cash and $15,000 in other valuables from people who chose not to fly.
