= Saved by the Light =

1994 book by Dannion Brinkley

- Author: Dannion Brinkley
- Genre: Non-fiction, memoir
- Publication date: 1994

Saved by the Light: The True Story of a Man Who Died Twice and the Profound Revelations He Received is a 1994 nonfiction book by Dannion Brinkley describing his near-death experience (NDE). It is co-authored by Paul Perry. The book was adapted for a 1995 Fox TV film of the same name starring Eric Roberts.

== Content ==
Brinkley claims to have been struck by lightning and to have been clinically dead for approximately twenty-eight minutes. He eventually told of a dark tunnel, a crystal city, and a "cathedral of knowledge" where thirteen "angels" shared with him over a hundred revelations about the future, some of which he claims have come true.

== Reception ==
=== Commercial success ===
Within two weeks of publication, 5,000 copies were added to the initial run of 35,000. The book was on The New York Times' bestseller charts for over 25 weeks and it was distributed in over 20 countries. In 1995, it was made into a movie of the same title.

Brinkley wrote three sequels: At Peace in the Light in 1995, Secrets of the Light in 2009, and Ten Things to Know Before You Go in 2014.

=== Refutations ===
Some of the book's assertions were subsequently challenged, including claims of where and how Brinkley recovered and how long he was supposedly dead, and claims made about his military service record. Interviews with his physician and the reporter who initially interviewed him indicate that Brinkley never entered the hospital or morgue and that Brinkley originally did not claim to have died, but only that he "was out for a few minutes", and that his wife saved his life.

== See also ==
- Saved by the Light (film)
