= James H. Hyslop =

American psychical researcher, psychologist and professor

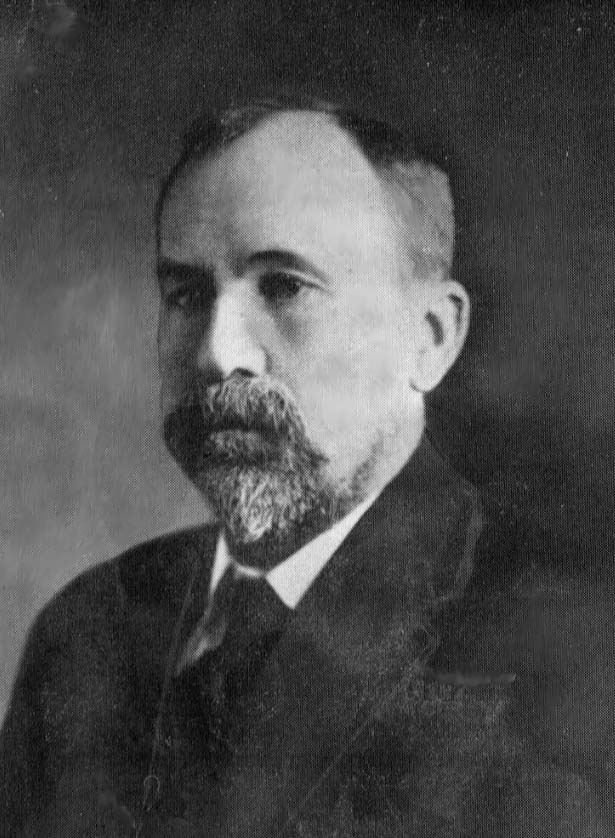
- Born: James Hervey Hyslop; August 18, 1854; Xenia, Ohio, US
- Died: June 17, 1920 (aged 65); Upper Montclair, New Jersey, US
- Education: Wooster College, Ohio (B.A., 1877); University of Leipzig (1882–84); Johns Hopkins University (Ph.D., 1877)
- Occupations: Professor, philosopher, psychical researcher, parapsychologist, writer
- Spouse: Mary Hall Hyslop (née Fry)
- Children: George Hall Hyslop; Mary Winifred Hyslop; Beatrice Fry Hyslop
- Writing career
- Subjects: Ethics, logic, psychics, mediumship, afterlife

James Hervey Hyslop, Ph.D., LL.D, (August 18, 1854 – June 17, 1920) was an American psychical researcher, psychologist, and professor of ethics and logic at Columbia University. He was one of the first American psychologists to connect psychology with psychic phenomena. In 1906 he helped reorganize the American Society for Psychical Research (ASPR) in New York City and served as the secretary-treasurer for the organization until his death.

== Education and academic career ==
Hyslop was educated at Wooster College, Ohio (B.A., 1877), the University of Leipzig (1882–84), and Johns Hopkins University (Ph.D., 1877).

He served as an instructor in philosophy in Lake Forest University in Illinois during 1880–82 and 1884–85, as the head of Department of Philosophy in Smith College in Massachusetts during 1885–86, and as a faculty member in Bucknell University in Pennsylvania during 1888–89. From 1889 to 1891 he worked as a tutor in philosophy, ethics and psychology. From 1891 to 1895 he worked as an instructor in ethics and from 1895 to 1902 as the professor of logic and ethics in Columbia University.

During his years at Columbia University Hyslop wrote several textbooks, including The Elements of Logic (1892), Elements of Ethics (1895), and Problems of Philosophy (1905), and also became deeply involved with psychical research.

In 1902 he received an honorary degree (LL.D) from the University of Wooster.

== Psychical research ==
Hyslop took interest in psychical research in the 1880s. After retiring from his teaching post due to ill health, Hyslop founded the American Institute for Scientific Research in 1904 to stir interest and raise funds for psychical research. He had initially planned one section of it to be devoted to the study of abnormal psychology and another section to psychic research, believing, as he said, that "at certain points the two fields tend to merge and at others they are widely separated".

He became an active member of the Society for Psychical Research and of its American branch, working closely with the secretary of the American group, Richard Hodgson, and with William James. However, the year following Richard Hodgson's death in 1905, the American Society for Psychical Research was dissolved. Hyslop revived ASPR as a section of his institute, and it soon absorbed and replaced the institute altogether. He assumed Hodgson's role as chief investigator of Leonora Piper's mediumship. He issued the first Journal in January 1907. He recruited both Hereward Carrington and Walter Franklin Prince to assist in the work. Hyslop was the secretary-treasurer and director of the organization from 1907 to 1920.

Hyslop's first book on psychical research, Science and a Future Life, was published in 1905, and many more followed, including Enigmas of Psychic Research (1906), Borderland of Psychical Research (1906), Psychical Research and the Resurrection (1908), Psychical Research and Survival (1913), Life After Death (1918), and Contact with the Other World (1919). He wrote for the Journal and Proceedings of the ASPR and the SPR and for such publications as Mind, The Philosophical Review, and The Nation. He became convinced in the existence of an afterlife.

I regard the existence of discarnate spirits as scientifically proved and I no longer refer to the skeptic as having any right to speak on the subject. Any man who does not accept the existence of discarnate spirits and the proof of it is either ignorant or a moral coward. I give him short shrift, and do not propose any longer to argue with him on the supposition that he knows anything about the subject.

— James H. Hyslop, Life After Death (1918)

=== Mental mediumship ===
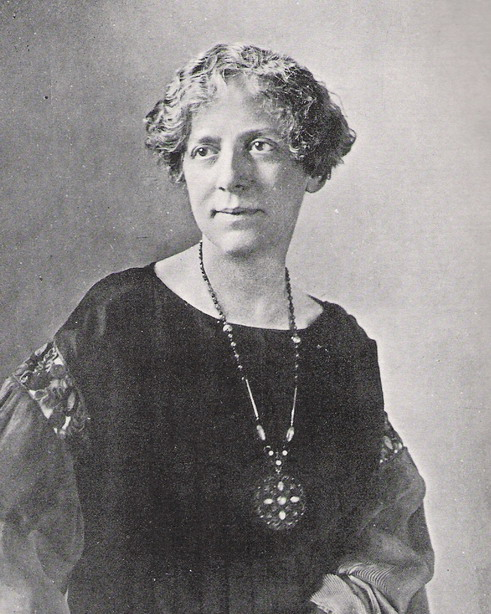
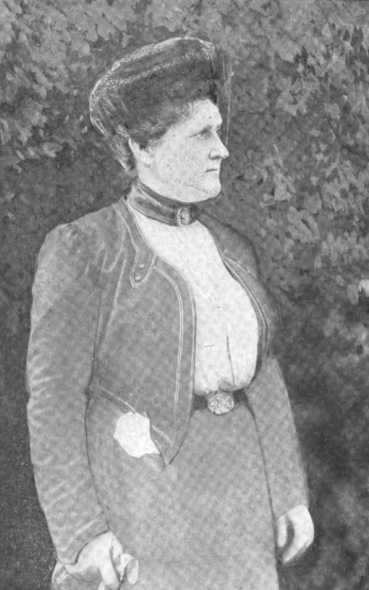
Pearl Curran (left) and Leonora Piper (right)

Originally an agnostic and materialist, Hyslop's interest in psychic investigation increased after sessions with the Boston medium Leonora Piper, whom he first met as early as 1888. Hyslop's first major experimental account of personal settings he had with Mrs. Piper was published in 1901 in the English proceedings. The issue as he saw it in this report was whether spiritism or telepathy exclusively from living people was the most rational explanation for the phenomena associated with Piper, in particular, messages allegedly received from his deceased relatives. He concluded his lengthy account by saying that these messages forced him to ”give my adhesion to the theory that there is a future life and persistence of personal identity.... [and] to tolerate the spiritistic theory as rationally possible and respectable, as against stretching telepathy and its adjuncts into infinity and omniscience.” He believed that through her he had received messages from his father, his wife, and other members of his family, about which he reported in the Journal of the Society for Psychical Research (London, 1901).

In his book Science and a Future Life (1905), Hyslop wrote of his séance sittings with the medium Leonora Piper and suggested they could only be explained by spirits or telepathy. Hyslop favoured the spiritualist hypothesis. However, Frank Podmore wrote that Hyslop's séance sittings with Piper "do not obviously call for any supernormal explanation" and "I cannot point to a single instance in which a precise and unambiguous piece of information has been furnished of a kind which could not have proceeded from the medium's own mind, working upon the materials provided and the hints let drop by the sitter."

Beginning in 1907, he worked with different mediums to investigate spirit possession and obsession. He made a deep study of multiple personalities and of obsession, and came to the conclusion that in many cases it could be attributed to spirit possession. Hyslop investigated the alleged spirit possession case of Doris Fischer. After investigation, Hyslop began to believe that the personalities of Fischer were discarnate spirits. Hyslop claimed that a spirit known as Count "Cagliostro" was the leader of the possessing spirits and performed an exorcism. Hyslop quit the case hoping Fischer had been cured, however, she died in a mental hospital years later.

In 1913, Edwin William Friend was employed by Hyslop as his assistant and with help of Theodate Pope became the editor for the Journal of American Society for Psychical Research. Friend was sent articles that were to be published in the journal but instead decided to write his own articles. In response, Hyslop repossessed the editorship of the journal and both Friend and Pope resigned from the ASPR in 1915. On May 1, 1915, both Friend and Pope set sail on the British passenger ship RMS Lusitania with plans of forming a new psychical organization with cooperation from the British Society for Psychical Research. On May 7, the ship was torpedoed by a German U-boat. Three days after the loss of the ship, Hyslop held séance sittings with the medium Mrs. Chenoweth in an attempt to contact Friend.

In 1916, Hyslop wrote that the whole case for Pearl Curran's mediumship was based on fraud. Hyslop in the Journal for the American Society for Psychical Research claimed that Curran had known people from the Ozarks who spoke a dialect reminiscent of Patience Worth and Curran's husband had studied Chaucer and educated her on the subject. According to Hyslop the case of Patience Worth was "a fraud and delusion for any person who wishes to treat it seriously." Hyslop also accused Casper Yost and the publisher of his book Henry Holt of knowing about the fraud but covering it up to increase sales of the book. In the Mirror articles appeared by Emily Hutchings and Yost defending Curran against allegations of fraud. In response, Hyslop wrote a letter to the Mirror which claimed he had been told of Curran's knowledge of Chaucer by a "scientific man" who had heard it from Mr Curran himself. In 1938 the ASPR journal published an anonymous article which refuted all of Hyslop's accusations. According to the article the Ozark dialect did not resemble the language of Patience Worth and knowledge of Chaucer would not have given Curran the vocabulary to compose the Patience Worth literature.

=== Physical mediumship ===
Although a believer in mental mediumship, Hyslop is said to have found the physical phenomena of spiritualism "repulsive". In 1906, Hyslop criticized the famous experiments of Johann Karl Friedrich Zöllner with the medium Henry Slade and pointed out eleven possible sources of error. Psychical researcher Hereward Carrington described Hyslop's criticisms as "very fine".

In a review for the Journal of American Society for Psychical Research in 1917, Hyslop wrote that various occurrences of levitation could have been faked by trickery. He also reviewed the psychical researcher William Jackson Crawford's experiments with the medium Kathleen Goligher and suggested that reported physical phenomena in the séance room could be unreliable.

== Personal life and family ==
Hyslop's twin sister, Sarah Luella, died when she was four months old. His three-year-old sister, Anna Laura; and his four-year-old brother, Charles both died of scarlet fever when Hyslop was ten. His parents were devout Presbyterians. As a youth he intended to enter the ministry as his parents expected, but while in college he went through a crisis of faith and became a materialist.

In 1891 he married Mary Fry Hall (1860–1900), an American woman who he had met while in Germany. A year after her death he suffered a nervous breakdown. They had one son, George H. Hyslop, and two daughters, Beatrice Fry Hyslop and Mary Winifred Hyslop. Hyslop was a friend of psychologist William James.

Hyslop died of thrombosis on June 17, 1920, at age 65, after a long illness.

In 1922, William van der Weyde produced an alleged spirit photograph of Hyslop during a séance at the house of Edwin F. Bowers. The photograph impressed members of Hyslop's family. According to Fulton Oursler the photograph was a fake. Weyde had taken a photograph of Hyslop before his death and had a plate in his possession that had never been developed.

For some time after his death his research assistant and longtime secretary, Gertrude O. Tubby, received what she believed were communications from Hyslop through many mediums in the United States, France and Britain. "I find it difficult to assume that I am dead," he allegedly said to Gertrude, through the medium, Mrs Chenoweth (1920). Messages such as this, frequently containing apparent cross references to one another, were published in her collection entitled James H. Hyslop - X His Book: A Cross Reference Record (1929).

== Reception ==
Biographer Arthur Berger has noted that Hyslop's writings were "criticized not only for their inadequacies but for his convoluted style." Psychical researchers such as William James, Richard Hodgson and Oliver Lodge had all complained that Hyslop could not express himself in clear and simple English and some of his psychical reports were ill written. There was also hostility towards Hyslop from other psychical researchers. Historian Robert Laurence Moore has written that "In large measure Hyslop had only himself to blame. He found it almost impossible to cooperate with people who could not be made to share his point of view."

Psychologist Joseph Jastrow criticized Hyslop's book Enigmas of Psychical Research as he was not "in any scientific sense investigating the residual phenomena of psychology" but searching for "another world" beyond the realm of science.

Physiologist Ivor Lloyd Tuckett criticized Hyslop's interpretation of Piper's mediumship and gave an example of a mistake her control had made which was alleged to be the spirit of Hyslop's father. The control when asked if he had remembered a "Samuel Cooper" responded that he was old friend in the West, and that they used to discuss philosophy on long walks together, but the statement was proven to be false. Tuckett came to the conclusion that Piper's controls were fictitious creations and her mediumship could best be explained without recourse to the paranormal.

Science writer Martin Gardner described Hyslop as "gullible and ignorant of magic". According to Gardner, Piper's trance control failed to guess correctly what Hyslop's uncle died from and took twenty séance sittings to guess his uncle's name. Gardner also wrote that "Hyslop had been introduced to Mrs. Piper by Hodgson, who could have provided the medium with all sorts of facts about him."

Psychologist H. N. Gardiner (1920) stated, "Hyslop cared little about style; what he cared greatly about was thoroughness" and, indeed, the cases reported in his bulky reports were described down to the minutest detail so that the facts could be studied. He felt "that the American public did not like brevity, but wanted full measure and overflowing in the discussion of any subject".

Philosopher Josiah Royce in a review for Hyslop's The Elements of Ethics wrote that "[His] conscientious and detailed analysis do honor to his fairness, and make his work an extremely thoughtful one; but in matters that concern speculative skill of a constructive type this book is often, to the present reader's mind, distinctly unsatisfactory."

In the preface to Gertrude Ogden's book James H. Hyslop - X His Book: A Cross Reference Record, physician Weston D. Bayley wrote that "Professor Hyslop, had, with wonderful persistence, patience and precision, placed on record a vast amount of experimental material, fully accredited and exactly sustained in accordance with the standards of evidence. His data, together with his detailed commentaries and observations, are a matter of public record. What he thus accomplished is his greatest monument; and no marble shaft could be more imperishable."

Hyslop in his book Life After Death. Problems of the Future Life and Its Nature argued for survival after bodily death. A review in The Monist wrote that he seemed too readily accepting of a spirit's personal identity from the alleged spirit possession case of Doris Fischer and "his attitude throughout is uncompromising."

Joseph McCabe has written that "Professor Hyslop, who in 1915 wrote me most critical letters about Spiritualism in general and the credulity of Sir Oliver Lodge in particular, became in his later years an enthusiastic Spiritualist and much less critical writer."

== Bibliography ==
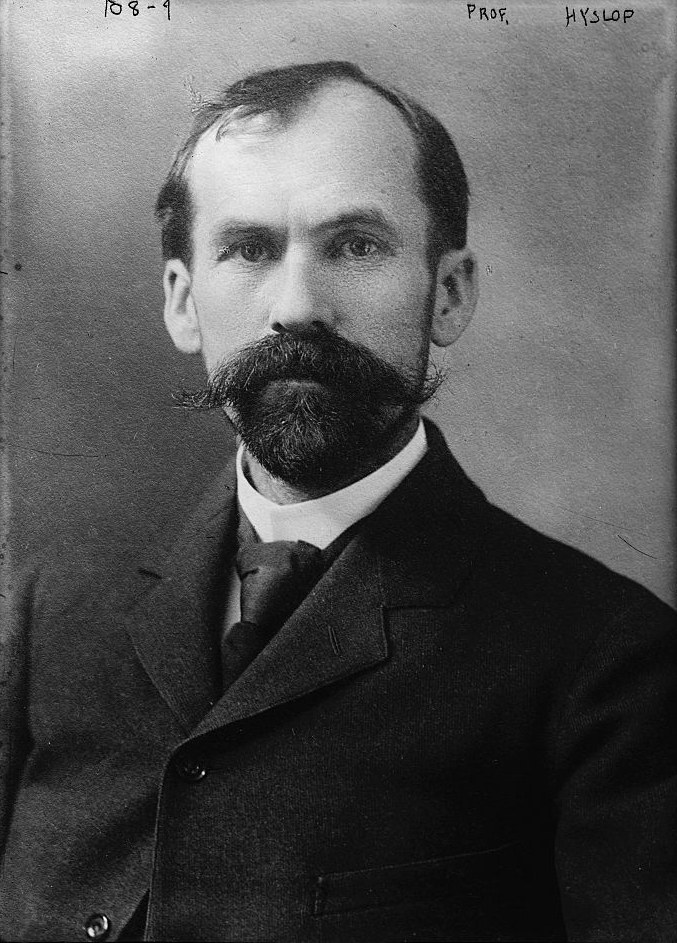

- The Elements of Logic: Theoretical and Practical (1892) (2009 reprint ISBN 1-115-80047-7)
- Hume's Treatise of Morals: And Selections from the Treatise of the Passions (1893) (2010 reprint ISBN 1-163-90299-3)
- Anomalies in Logic (1894)
- Freedom, Responsibility and Punishment (1894)
- The Elements of Ethics (1895)
- Elements of Psychology (1895) (2010 reprint ISBN 1-167-06373-2)
- Logic and Argument (1899) (2010 reprint ISBN 1-147-54700-9)
- Democracy: A Study of Government (1988) (2010 reprint ISBN 1-178-16951-0)
- Syllabus of Psychology (1989) (2005 reprint ISBN 1-4179-6252-6)
- The Wants of Psychical Research (1900)
- A Further Record of Observations of Certain Trance Phenomena (1901)
- The Ethics of the Greek Philosophers: Socrates, Plato and Aristotle (1903) (2010 reprint ISBN 1-176-46651-8)
- Problems of Philosophy: Or, Principles of Epistemology and Metaphysics (1905)
- Science and A Future Life (1905) (2005 reprint ISBN 1-4179-7235-1)
- The Mental State of The Dead: A Limitation to Psychical Research (1905)
- Enigmas of Psychical Research (1906) (2010 reprint ISBN 1-142-68324-9)
- Borderland of Psychical Research (1906) (2005 reprint ISBN 1-4179-7497-4)
- Psychical Research and the Resurrection (1908) (2005 reprint ISBN 1-4179-7498-2)
- A Record and Discussion of Mediumistic Experiments (1910)* Psychical Research and Survival (1913) (2006 reprint ISBN 1-4286-1248-3)
- The Thompson Case (1913) (article)
- The Doris Case of Multiple Personality (1915–1917) (with Walter Franklin Prince)
- The Smead Case (1918)
- Poems, Original and Translations (1915) (2010 reprint ISBN 1-141-53838-5)
- Life After Death: Problems of the Future Life and Its Nature (1918) (2006 reprint ISBN 1-4254-8371-2)
- Contact with the Other World: The Latest Evidence as to Communication with the Dead (1919) (2010 reprint ISBN 1-161-39587-3)
