= Frank Podmore =

British parapsychologist (1856–1910)

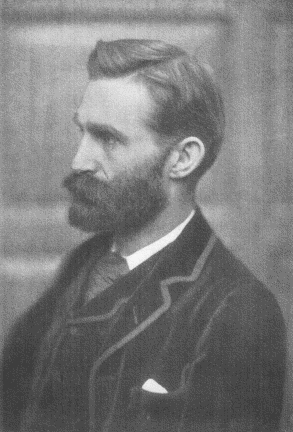
- Born: 5 February 1856; Elstree, Hertfordshire, England
- Died: 14 August 1910 (aged 54); Malvern, Worcestershire, England
- Occupations: Parapsychologist, writer

Frank Podmore (5 February 1856 – 14 August 1910) was an English author and founding member of the Fabian Society as well as an influential member of the Society for Psychical Research. He is known for his interest in spiritualism, which he eventually developed a sceptical attitude towards, specifically the claims of mediumship which he attacked in his history of mediumship, The New Spiritualism (1910). However, he defended other experiences such as telepathy and ghosts, which he regarded as telepathic hallucinations.

== Life ==
Born at Elstree, Borehamwood, Hertfordshire, Podmore was the son of Thompson Podmore, an Anglican priest and the headmaster of Eastbourne College. He was educated at Haileybury and Pembroke College, Oxford (where he first became interested in Spiritualism and joined the Society for Psychical Research – this interest remained with him throughout his life). After graduating he went to work for the Post Office, where he worked for most of the rest of his life.

In October 1883, Podmore and Edward R. Pease joined a socialist debating group established by Edith Nesbit and Hubert Bland. Podmore suggested that the group should be named after the Roman General, Quintus Fabius Maximus Verrucosus, who advocated weakening the opposition by harassing operations rather than becoming involved in pitched battles. In January 1884 the group became known as the Fabian Society, and Podmore's home at 14 Dean's Yard, Westminster, became the organisation's first official headquarters.

He was a member of the Oxford Phasmatological Society which dissolved in 1885. In 1886 Podmore and Sidney Webb conducted a study into unemployment, eventually published as a Fabian Society pamphlet, The Government Organisation of Unemployed Labour. Podmore married Eleanore Bramwell in 1891, however, the marriage was a failure and they separated. They had no children.

His major work was a detailed study of the life and ideas of Robert Owen (1906). Podmore resigned from a senior post in the Post Office in 1907. Psychical researcher Alan Gauld wrote that he "was compelled to resign without pension from the Post Office because of alleged homosexual involvements. He separated from his wife, and went to live with his brother Claude, rector of Broughton, near Kettering."

Podmore died by drowning at Malvern, Worcestershire, in August 1910.

Researcher Ronald Pearsall wrote that it was generally believed that Podmore was a homosexual and that it was "very strange" that his brother Claude, his wife or any member of the Society for Psychical Research did not attend his funeral.

== Psychical research ==
Podmore at first was impressed by the claims of spiritualism after attending a seance of Henry Slade, and addressed the National Association of Spiritualists in 1880. He gave a report on a poltergeist case Worksop which he believed to be genuine, but reassessed the case in 1896 finding it fraudulent. This change may have resulted from an unsympathetic review of his work by H. G. Wells, which Historian Brian Inglis suggests embarrassed Podmore and made him more sceptical, wanting to be viewed as "a detached, scientific, no-nonsense commentator on psychic affairs".

Podmore's books, giving non-paranormal explanations from much of the psychical research that he studied, received positive reviews in science journals. His book Studies in Psychical Research received a positive review in the British Medical Journal which described his debunking of fraudulent mediums as scientific and came to the conclusion the "book is well worth reading, and it is agreeable reading, for the style is generally vigorous and not infrequently brilliant."

Podmore who considered most mediums fraudulent, was open minded about the telepathic hypothesis for Leonora Piper's séances. However, Ivor Lloyd Tuckett had "completely undermined" this hypothesis for Mrs. Piper. Podmore was critical of Helena Blavatsky and her claims of Theosophy. He evaluated poltergeist cases and concluded they are best explained by deception and trickery.

Rationalist author Joseph McCabe stated that despite Podmore's "highly critical faculty" he was misled in the Piper case by Richard Hodgson. This was based on a letter he saw in the 2nd edition Spiritualism and Oliver Lodge by Dr. Charles Arthur Mercier, from a cousin of George Pellew to Edward Clodd, alleging that Hodgson claimed that Professor Fiske from his séance with Piper was "absolutely convinced" Piper's control was the real George Pellew, but that when Pellew's brother contacted Fiske about it, he replied it was "a lie" as Piper had been "silent or entirely wrong" on all his questions. However, Alan Gauld, referring to this letter as published by Clodd, stated that it was "wholly unreliable", noted that Hodgson in his original report wrote that Fiske had a negative attitude, and that Hodgson himself considered the Fiske sittings to be of no evidential value.

Podmore's text Mesmerism and Christian Science: A Short History of Mental Healing received a positive review in the British Journal of Psychiatry, which referred to it as "an excellent account of this interesting and important subject." His 1910 piece of mediumship, The New Spiritualism, was deeply sceptical, in which every medium tested was dismissed as a charlatan.

Podmore defended the validity of telepathy and ghosts, the latter of which he believed to be "telepathic hallucinations."

== Works ==
- Phantasms of the Living. (1886, written with Frederick Myers and Edmund Gurney).
- The Government Organisation of Unemployed Labour. (1886).
- Apparitions and Thought-Transference. (1894).
- Studies in Psychical Research. (1897).
- Modern Spiritualism (1902). Reprinted as Mediums of the 19th Century. (1963).
- Robert Owen A Biography. Volume 1; Volume 2. (1906).
- The Naturalisation of the Supernatural. (1908).
- Mesmerism and Christian Science. (1909).
- Telepathic Hallucinations: The New View of Ghosts. (1909).
- The Newer Spiritualism. (1910).

== See also ==
- Eusapia Palladino#Tricks
