= Cross-correspondences =

Phenomenon related to spiritism

Winifred Coombe Tennant, a medium involved in the cross-correspondences.

The cross-correspondences were a series of automatic scripts and trance utterances from a group of automatic writers and mediums, involving members of the Society for Psychical Research (SPR). According to psychical researchers the correspondences when put together convey intelligible messages either from spirits of the dead or telepathy.

Sceptics have stated that the correspondences can be explained by chance or self-delusion and is a case of researchers looking for connections in random or meaningless data.

== History ==
Mary Catherine Lyttleton, known as May, fell in love with Arthur Balfour, Member of Parliament and future Prime Minister, in 1874, but fell ill and died on Palm Sunday, 21 March 1875, before Balfour could declare his intent. According to the SPR, in the next 30 years thousands of fragmentary messages from numerous mediums, when considered as a whole, seem to indicate Lyttleton was trying to communicate with Balfour, aided by members of the SPR Edmund Gurney, Henry Sidgwick and Frederic W. H. Myers.

In 1891, Myers wrote a message on a piece of paper then sealed it in an envelope. Myers gave the envelope to Oliver Lodge with instructions to open it before witnesses after his death if the message from the paper should be received through a medium. Myers died in 1901, and various mediums were organised into concurrent sittings at locations very far apart, and notes were made of the words and phrases, and the automatic writings thus obtained. The messages were unintelligible individually and to individual mediums, but over a long period and many seances, it was claimed by the SPR that there was purpose in the correspondences, indicating an intelligent entity was behind them. The principal recipients of the messages included Mrs Margaret Verrall and her daughter Helen; Mrs Winifred Coombe Tennant, who practised as a medium under the name "Mrs Willett"; and Mrs Alice Fleming, sister of Rudyard Kipling, who practised as "Mrs Holland".

It was alleged Myer's spirit communicated through Mrs Verrall on 13 July 1904 by producing a manuscript which made reference to Myers' message. When the manuscript was examined the message was incorrect and it also referred to the place where the envelope was kept which was completely wrong. On 13 December 1904, Oliver Lodge arranged a meeting for members for the Society for Psychical Research. The contents of the envelope were made known to those present. A report was published by the Society's journal in 1905 which stated, "It has, then, to be reported that this one experiment has completely failed and it cannot be denied that the failure is disappointing."

Other mediums involved in cross-correspondences have included Mina Crandon, Leonora Piper and George Valiantine. Both Crandon and Valiantine were exposed as frauds.

== Critical reception ==
The psychologist Amy Tanner examined the cross-correspondences in detail. Tanner noted that whilst the cross-correspondences were taking place, the SPR allowed Mrs Verrall and her daughter to frequent sittings with Mrs Piper and this was a possible source of sensory leakage. She concluded that the psychical researchers had not taken into account the association of ideas, ignored the similarity between English and Latin and had used any interpretation to make a meaning out of the words.

The psychical researcher Eric Dingwall wrote that the Society for Psychical Research refused outside investigation with relation to the cross-correspondences and researchers not connected with the case could not examine the original documents. The identity of some of the mediums was kept secret and the public was only permitted to know who Mrs. Willett was after she had died.

Edward Clodd wrote that the explanation for the cross-correspondences was the subconscious mind of the medium, not spirits. According to Clodd many of the messages were "inconsequential rubbish". Mrs Verrall was a well-educated classicist who had studied Latin and Greek with her husband. Clodd suggested that Mrs Willet had communicated with Verrall and looked up references in classical lore.

Ivor Lloyd Tuckett noted that "in practically every cross-correspondence, there is vagueness and incorrectness of detail, allowing plenty of room for biased interpretation." Criticism of the cross-correspondences also came from the psychiatrist Charles Arthur Mercier. He studied two cases and noted they could "be twisted into any appearance of referring to the same thing, or of emanating from the same source."

In 1986, the magician John Booth who examined the cross-correspondences suggested that they could be explained by chance, law of averages, deliberate fraud or self-delusion.

Author John Grant commenting in 2015 did not find the cross-correspondences to be reliable evidence for an afterlife, and warned readers of falling into the trap of "intellectual pareidolia".
