= Richard Hodgson (parapsychologist) =

Australian-born psychical researcher

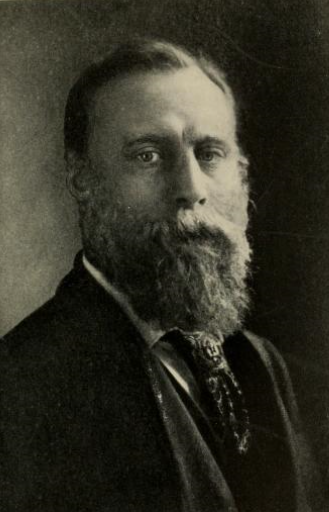
- Born: 24 September 1855; Melbourne, Australia
- Died: 21 December 1905 (aged 50); Boston, Massachusetts, United States
- Occupation: Psychical researcher

Richard Hodgson (24 September 1855 – 21 December 1905) was an Australian-born psychical researcher who investigated spiritualist mediums such as Eusapia Palladino and Leonora Piper. During his later life, Hodgson became a spiritualist medium himself and believed to be in communication with spirits.

== Biography ==
Hodgson was born in Melbourne, Australia on 24 September 1855 to Mr. R. Hodgson, leather merchant of Melbourne. He had completed his M.A. and LL.D. courses in Melbourne by 1877, when he was only twenty-two years old. The doctorate was received in 1878 from the University of Melbourne.

In the 1880s he moved to England to study Mental and Moral Science at St John's College, Cambridge. Two of his lecturers were Henry Sidgwick and John Venn. Sidgwick sponsored Hodgson to study in Jena in Germany, and Herbert Spencer provided a very flattering letter of introduction to Haeckel.

He became a member of the Society for Psychical Research (SPR) in 1882. Hodgson joined the American Society for Psychical Research in 1887 to serve as its secretary.

Hodgson was sent by the SPR in 1884 to India to investigate Helena Blavatsky and concluded that her claims of psychic power were fraudulent. His findings became known as the Hodgson Report. Among the phenomena that Hodgson investigated was the supposed miraculous Theosophical letters from the Mahatmas which were said to magically appear over a four-year period in a cabinet in the Shrine Room at the Theosophical headquarters in Madras. Hodgson in his report wrote that the letters were frauds and had been written by Blavatsky herself who had put them in the cabinet from an opening in her bedroom located behind the Shrine room. Although a believer in mental mediumship, Hodgson was a critic of physical mediumship which he said was fraudulent. Some of the mediums that he exposed as frauds were William Eglinton, Eusapia Palladino, Henry Slade and Rosina Thompson.

A. T. Baird author of the book Richard Hodgson published by Psychic Press Limited, London in 1949 is the only biography of Hodgson. Joseph McCabe praised the work of Hodgson in debunking fraudulent mediums but wrote he was credulous on his study of Leonora Piper. J. T. Hackett dedicated his book My Commonplace Book to Hodgson and stated that about one-third of the main quotations in the book came direct from Hodgson. Hodgson is also mentioned in the book The Unseen Guest by Joan Darby.

== Eusapia Palladino ==
The psychical researcher Charles Richet with Oliver Lodge, Frederic W. H. Myers and Julian Ochorowicz investigated the medium Eusapia Palladino in the summer of 1894 at his house in the Ile Roubaud in the Mediterranean. Richet claimed furniture moved during the séance and that some of the phenomena was the result of a supernatural agency. However, Hodgson said there was inadequate control during the séances and the precautions described did not rule out trickery. Hodgson wrote all the phenomena "described could be account for on the assumption that Eusapia could get a hand or foot free." Lodge, Myers and Richet disagreed, but Hodgson was later proven correct in the Cambridge sittings as Palladino was observed to have used tricks exactly the way he had described them.

In July 1895, Hodgson was invited to England to Myers' house in Cambridge for a series of investigations into the mediumship of Palladino. According to reports by Hodgson, Myers and Oliver Lodge, all the phenomena observed in the Cambridge sittings were the result of trickery. Her fraud was so clever, according to Myers, that it "must have needed long practice to bring it to its present level of skill."

In the Cambridge sittings the results proved disastrous for her mediumship. During the séances Palladino was caught cheating in order to free herself from the physical controls of the experiments. Palladino was found liberating her hands by placing the hand of the controller on her left on top of the hand of the controller on her right. Instead of maintaining any contact with her, the observers on either side were found to be holding each other's hands and this made it possible for her to perform tricks. Hodgson had observed Palladino free a hand to move objects and use her feet to kick pieces of furniture in the room. Because of the discovery of fraud, the British SPR investigators such as Henry Sidgwick and Frank Podmore considered Palladino's mediumship to be permanently discredited and because of her fraud she was banned from any further experiments with the SPR in Britain.

In 1898, Myers was invited to a series of séances in Paris with Charles Richet. In contrast to the previous séances in which he had observed fraud he said to have observed convincing phenomena. Sidgwick reminded Myers of Palladino's trickery in the previous investigations as "overwhelming" but Myers did not change his position. This enraged Hodgson, then editor of SPR publications to ban Myers from publishing anything on his recent sittings with Palladino in the SPR journal. Hodgson was convinced Palladino was a fraud and supported Sidgwick in the "attempt to put that vulgar cheat Eusapia beyond the pale." It wasn't until the 1908 sittings in Naples that the SPR reopened the Palladino file.

== Leonora Piper ==
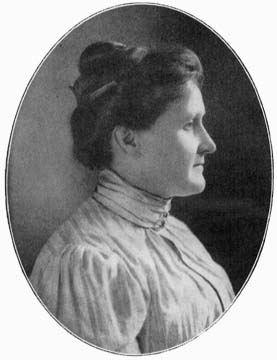
Leonora Piper

Hodgson was one of the very few psychical researchers who believed Leonora Piper's controls were spirits. In February, 1895 Dean Bridgman Connor a young electrician died of typhoid fever in an American Hospital in Mexico. His death was notified to his parents living in Burlington, Vermont. Connor's father claimed to have experienced a dream that his son was not dead, but alive and held captive in Mexico. There was publicity over the incident and Hodgson consulted Piper in which she gave several séances. It was alleged that Piper's spirit control claimed Conner was alive in a lunatic asylum kept by a "Dr. Cintz".

Anthony Philpott a journalist for The Boston Globe travelled to Mexico to investigate the incident but could find no lunatic asylum or Dr. Cintz as described by Piper's control. Philpott visited the hospital where Connor was reported to have died and interviewed the nurse Helen Smith (Mrs. F. U. Winn) in Tuxpan, Veracruz who attended Connor and she confirmed he had died of typhoid fever in the hospital. On his return to Boston, Hodgson would not believe Philpott and insisted that Connor was alive and that if he had the money he would go to Mexico and find him. Philpott offered to pay his expenses and advertised the offer, however Hodgson declined the offer and did not go to Mexico. Due to the incorrect information the Dean Connor case has been described as an incident that has cast doubt on Piper's alleged ability to contact the dead.

Deborah Blum has written that Hodgson was personally obsessed with Piper. Hodgson would stand outside her house, observing her for long periods of time even in the winter blizzards of 1888. The American psychologist Morton Prince who knew Hodgson well commented that the mediumship of Piper had "wrecked" his mind.

Hodgson, during the latter days of his life, would allow no one to enter the privacy of his room in 15 Charles Street. During these years Hodgson believed that he constantly received direct communication with the regular band of spirits in charge of Piper. He received these messages when alone in the evening. He allowed no one to enter his room. Hodgson was afraid they would disturb the "magnetic atmosphere". He told very few people about this. Hodgson's lover, Jessie D., died in 1879.

In a séance Piper's control told Hodgson he would get married, have two children and have a long life but Hodgson died a few months later, unmarried and childless. After the death of Hodgson between December 1905 and the beginning of 1908 Piper held about seventy séances during which the spirit of Hodgson was said to have communicated through her. However the control of Piper sounded nothing like Hodgson. According to Joseph McCabe "when Hodgson died in 1905 and left a large amount of manuscript in cipher, she could not get the least clue to it. When friends put test questions to the spirit of Hodgson about his early life in Australia, the answers were all wrong." The Hodgson control was asked the name of his schoolmaster in Melbourne but failed to give the correct answer, Hodgson's sister who was sent the messages was not convinced they were from Hodgson. Before he died Hodgson had written a test letter, and said that if he was to communicate through Piper he would reveal the contents inside the letter. Piper's Hodgson control failed to reveal the test letter.

Joseph McCabe stated Hodgson was an unreliable source on account of a letter he saw in the 2nd edition Spiritualism and Oliver Lodge by Charles Arthur Mercier, from a cousin of George Pellew to Edward Clodd, alleging that Hodgson said that Professor Fiske from his séance with Piper was "absolutely convinced" Piper's control was the real George Pellew, but that when Pellew's brother contacted Fiske about it, he replied it was "a lie" as Piper had been "silent or entirely wrong" on all his questions. Alan Gauld, referring to this letter as published by Clodd, stated that it was "wholly unreliable", noted that Hodgson in his original report wrote that Fiske had a negative attitude, and noted that Hodgson himself considered the Fiske sittings to be of no evidential value.

The psychologist and psychical researcher James Hyslop dedicated his 1905 book Science and a Future Life, a study of the mediumship of Piper, to Hodgson, writing that Hodgson's research led him to the conclusions defended in the book.

== See also ==
- Hodgson Report (Richard Hodgson's 1885 SPR negative report on Helena Blavatsky)
