= Mediumship studies =

Subdiscipline of parapsychology

Mediumship studies is the field of research that investigates mediumship – the claimed ability of certain individuals ("mediums") to relay information from, or communicate with, the dead or other discarnate entities. The field grew out of nineteenth-century psychical research and overlaps substantially with parapsychology. Researchers in this area attempt to test, under controlled conditions, whether mediums can obtain information that cannot be explained by ordinary means, and to characterise the psychological and physiological states associated with mediumistic activity.

The scientific consensus is that there is no reliable evidence that mediums can communicate with the dead; reported successes are generally attributed to cold reading, the Barnum effect, selective reporting, sensory leakage or fraud.

== Definition and scope ==
Mediumship studies is concerned both with mental mediumship – in which a medium reports impressions, names or messages said to come from the deceased – and with physical mediumship, in which physical effects such as raps, movement of objects, materialisations or ectoplasm are claimed to occur. Research questions have included whether the information a medium provides is accurate beyond chance, whether such accuracy can be obtained when ordinary sources of information are excluded, and what neurological or psychological correlates accompany the mediumistic state.

The field is distinct from, but historically linked to, near-death studies and research into reincarnation, all of which form part of the broader investigation of claims bearing on the survival of consciousness after death.

== History ==
=== Early psychical research (1850s–1930s) ===
Systematic investigation of mediums began with the rise of Spiritualism in the mid-nineteenth century. The chemist and physicist William Crookes conducted sittings with the medium Daniel Dunglas Home and the materialisation medium Florence Cook, reporting in Researches in the Phenomena of Spiritualism (1874) that he had observed a "psychic force" he could not explain by known physics. His work was controversial and was later criticised for inadequate controls.

After the founding of the Society for Psychical Research (SPR) in 1882, investigation became more organised. The trance medium Leonora Piper was studied for decades by Richard Hodgson, the philosopher William James and others, whose reports appeared in the Proceedings of the Society for Psychical Research. The French physiologist and Nobel laureate Charles Richet, who coined the terms "metapsychics" and "ectoplasm", summarised early experimental work in his Traité de Métapsychique (1922). The German physician Albert von Schrenck-Notzing photographed alleged materialisations produced by the medium "Eva C." and published his observations in Phenomena of Materialisation (1920); several of these cases were later contested as fraudulent.

=== Cross-correspondences and trance mediumship ===
Between roughly 1901 and 1932, SPR investigators studied the so-called cross-correspondences – fragmentary automatic writing scripts produced independently by several mediums that, taken together, were said to form coherent messages. Reports by Alice Johnson, J. G. Piddington and others appeared in the Proceedings of the Society for Psychical Research and were interpreted by some researchers as evidence of a guiding discarnate intelligence, an interpretation disputed by critics.

== Modern controlled studies ==
From the late 1990s, several research groups attempted to apply blinded and quantitative protocols to mental mediumship.

- The psychologist Gary Schwartz led the VERITAS Research Program at the University of Arizona. In a 2001 paper in the Journal of the Society for Psychical Research and in the popular book The Afterlife Experiments (2002), Schwartz reported above-chance accuracy by selected mediums. The studies were sharply criticised for inadequate controls against cold reading and sensory leakage.
- The Windbridge Institute (later Windbridge Research Center), founded by Julie Beischel, introduced a triple-blind protocol intended to address those criticisms. A 2007 study in Explore and a 2015 replication reported anomalous information reception by "research mediums" under conditions in which the medium, the sitter and the experimenter were all blinded.
- A 2021 meta-analysis by Tressoldi and colleagues pooled controlled mediumship experiments and reported a small but statistically significant effect, while noting heterogeneity and the possibility of publication bias.

=== Neuroimaging and psychiatric studies ===
Other research has examined the mediumistic state itself rather than the accuracy of messages. In Brazil, the psychiatrist Alexander Moreira-Almeida compared Spiritist mediums with patients diagnosed with dissociative identity disorder, reporting that the mediums were generally well-adjusted and socially functional. A 2012 SPECT study by Peres, Moreira-Almeida, Andrew Newberg and colleagues found altered activity in brain regions associated with attention and self-awareness in experienced psychography mediums during trance, compared with non-trance writing.

=== Content and handwriting analysis ===
A separate line of investigation has examined the content and handwriting of mediumistic writings rather than experimental accuracy. The Brazilian medium Chico Xavier, who through psychography produced more than 400 books and thousands of letters attributed to deceased authors, has been studied because his unusually large and individually attributed corpus lends itself to forensic handwriting and stylometric analysis. In 1991 the court-recognised Brazilian document examiner Carlos Augusto Perandréa published A Psicografia à Luz da Grafoscopia, in which he compared the handwriting of psychographed letters with samples written by the deceased during their lifetimes and reported that several of the psychographed samples matched the documented handwriting of the purported authors more closely than Xavier's own hand, displaying the fluency of habitual rather than imitated writing. The anthropologist Bernardo Lewgoy later situated Xavier's output within Brazilian culture in O grande mediador (2004). No systematic, independently replicated computational stylometric study of the corpus has yet been published, and critics regard the handwriting assessments as resting on the judgement of individual examiners.

== Physical mediumship investigations ==
Investigations of physical mediumship have continued into the modern period. The most widely discussed recent example is the Scole Experiment (1993–1998) in Norfolk, England, in which SPR investigators Montague Keen, Arthur Ellison and David Fontana reported lights, sounds and apparent object phenomena. Their account, "The Scole Report", appeared in the Proceedings of the Society for Psychical Research (1999); critics noted that the conditions were controlled by the mediums and that the sessions were held in darkness, leaving the results open to alternative explanations.

== Methodology ==
Methodological debate has centred on how to exclude ordinary explanations for apparent accuracy. Techniques developed in the field include the use of proxy sitters (who relay no information to the medium), absent or blinded sitters, the prevention of any sensory contact between medium and sitter, randomised assignment of readings, and blinded scoring in which sitters rate transcripts without knowing which reading was intended for them. Critics maintain that even with such measures, factors such as the generality of statements, subjective validation and the way accuracy is scored can produce apparently significant results.

== Explanatory models ==
Researchers and commentators have proposed several classes of explanation for mediumship phenomena:

- Conventional psychological and social explanations – cold reading, the Barnum effect, confirmation bias, cueing and, in some historical cases, deliberate fraud. This is the mainstream scientific position.
- Psychological/dissociative models – mediumship as a culturally shaped, generally non-pathological form of dissociation or anomalous experience.
- Anomalous-information ("psi") models – the suggestion, advanced by some parapsychologists, that mediums obtain information by extrasensory perception from living people or other sources.
- Survival models – the interpretation, held mainly by Spiritualists and some researchers, that the information originates from surviving discarnate personalities. Distinguishing this from the psi hypothesis is known as the "survival versus super-psi" problem.

== Research organisations and certification ==
Institutions associated with mediumship research have included the Society for Psychical Research (London), the American Society for Psychical Research, the Institut Métapsychique International (Paris), and, in Brazil, university-based groups studying Spiritist mediumship. Some private organisations, such as the Windbridge Research Center and the Forever Family Foundation, have operated screening or "certification" procedures intended to identify mediums for research; these procedures are not recognised by mainstream scientific or professional bodies.

== Reception and criticism ==
Mainstream scientific and skeptical commentators hold that mediumship studies have not produced replicable evidence acceptable to the wider scientific community, and that the field's positive results are concentrated in specialist parapsychology journals rather than in general scientific literature. Critics including Richard Wiseman, Ray Hyman and members of skeptical organisations have argued that high-profile studies suffered from inadequate blinding, optional stopping, biased scoring, and insufficient guards against sensory leakage and fraud. Historical physical mediumship in particular has a long record of exposed fraud.

Proponents respond that modern triple-blind protocols address the principal methodological objections and that meta-analytic results remain significant after correction, while acknowledging unresolved questions of replication and possible publication bias. The debate remains unresolved within mainstream science, which continues to regard the central claim – communication with the dead – as unsupported.

== See also ==
- Mediumship
- Parapsychology
- Psychical research
- Near-death studies
- Survival hypothesis
- Society for Psychical Research
