= Leonora Piper =

American trance medium (1857–1950)

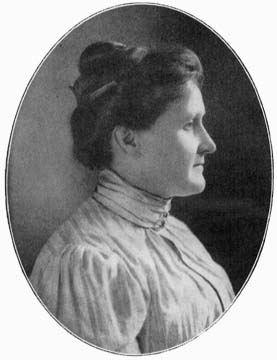
- Born: June 27, 1857
- Died: June 3, 1950
- Occupation: Trance medium

Leonora Piper (née Leonora Evelina Simonds; 27 June 1857 – 3 June 1950) was a famous American trance medium in the area of Spiritualism. Piper was the subject of intense interest and investigation by American and British psychic research associations during the early 20th century, including psychologist William James and the Society for Psychical Research.

Researchers and scientists who studied Piper's mediumship have described mentalist techniques such as cold reading, muscle reading and "fishing", all techniques that she may have used to gather information about séance sitters, so she could appear to have unexplained insight. Science writer and mathematician Martin Gardner dismissed Piper as a "clever charlatan."

== Biography ==
Piper was born to Stillman and Hannah (Stevens) Simonds. She grew up in Nashua, New Hampshire, where, according to her parents, she first displayed psychic abilities as a child. At the age of 22 she married shopkeeper William Piper of Boston and settled in the city's Beacon Hill area. After the birth of her first child, Alta Laurette, on May 16, 1884, in Boston, she sought relief from recurring pain caused by a childhood accident. A second daughter, Minerva Leonora, followed on October 7, 1885. Upon visiting an elderly blind man who claimed he could contact spirits that could aid in healing, she said she heard voices that resulted in her ability to deliver a message by automatic writing to a local judge who claimed the words came from his recently deceased son. Before Piper was investigated by psychical researchers she worked as a paid medium at a dollar for each sitting.

George E. Dorr, Piper's manager, set up six sittings with Dr. G. Stanley Hall and his associate Amy Tanner both from Clark University. A sitting with Mrs. Piper about 1910 cost $20.00. Piper made a fortune from her séances whilst being tested by psychical researchers, she was receiving around $1000 a year for her mediumship services. Piper was a trance medium but in her later séances preferred automatic writing. Piper died on July 3, 1950, at her home from bronchopneumonia. She was buried in Mount Pleasant Cemetery, Massachusetts.

== Career ==
=== Investigators ===
Agreeing to do readings for other visitors in her home, she soon gained attention from members of the American Society for Psychical Research and later its British associate, the Society for Psychical Research. Among these were Minot Savage, Richard Hodgson and George B. Dorr. Later psychic investigators included Oliver Lodge, Frederic Myers, James Hyslop, and G. Stanley Hall and his assistant Amy Tanner.

In 1885, the year after the death of his young son, psychologist, philosopher, and SPR member William James had his first sitting with Piper at the suggestion of his mother-in-law. He advocated a "third way" as a sort of agnosticism for cases where things were not yet explained and held out for the possibility of belief. James was soon convinced that Piper knew things she could only have discovered by supernatural means. James expressed his belief in Piper by saying, "If you wish to upset the law that all crows are black, it is enough if you prove that one crow is white. My white crow is Mrs. Piper." as well as stating, "My own conviction is not evidence, but it seems fitting to record it. I am persuaded of the medium's honesty, and of the genuineness of her trance; and although at first disposed to think that the 'hits' she made were either lucky coincidences, or the result of knowledge on her part of who the sitter was and of his or her family affairs, I now believe her to be in possession of a power as yet unexplained." However, James did not believe that Piper was in contact with spirits. After evaluating sixty-nine reports of Piper's mediumship he considered the hypothesis of telepathy as well as Piper obtaining information about her sitters by natural means such as her memory recalling information. James could find little "independent evidence" to support the spirit-control hypothesis. Most of it was ambiguous or only circumstantially relevant, and some of it was false. However, Piper and the Italian Eusapia Palladino became the most widely studied parapsychologists and mediums of their time, especially by the works of Hugo Münsterberg and G. Stanley Hall.

Later when Piper's "spirit contact" was claimed to be recently deceased Society for Psychical Research member Richard Hodgson, James wrote, "I remain uncertain and await more facts, facts which may not point clearly to a conclusion for fifty or a hundred years."

James Hyslop wrote of his séance sittings with Piper and suggested they could only be explained by spirits or telepathy. Hyslop favored the spiritualist hypothesis. However, Frank Podmore wrote that Hyslop's séance sittings with Piper "do not obviously call for any supernormal explanation" and "I cannot point to a single instance in which a precise and unambiguous piece of information has been furnished of a kind which could not have proceeded from the medium's own mind, working upon the materials provided and the hints let drop by the sitter."

Hyslop's trance report on Piper and views on spiritualism were criticized in depth by psychologist James H. Leuba, leading to a dispute between them.

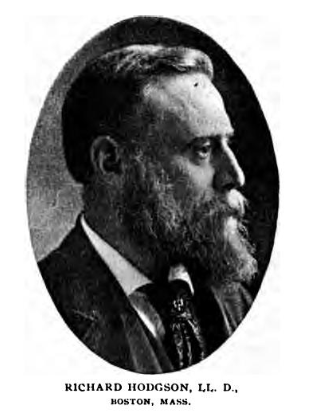
Richard Hodgson a psychical researcher who became "obsessed" with Piper.

Richard Hodgson was one of the very few psychical researchers that believed Piper was in contact with spirits. Deborah Blum has written that Hodgson was personally obsessed with Piper. Hodgson would stand outside her house, observing her for long periods of time even in the winter blizzards of 1888. The American psychologist Morton Prince who knew Hodgson well commented that the mediumship of Piper had "wrecked" his mind.

Hodgson, during the latter days of his life, would allow no one to enter the privacy of his room in 15 Charles Street. During these years Hodgson believed that he constantly received direct communication with the regular band of spirits in charge of Piper. He received these messages when alone in the evening. He allowed no one to enter his room. Hodgson was afraid they would disturb the "magnetic atmosphere". He told very few people about this. Hodgson's lover, Jessie D., died in 1879. After Piper supposedly contacted the spirit of the deceased Australian woman Hodgson promised to marry, according to Hereward Carrington, Hodgson's reason deteriorated and he became a recluse in his dark room, believing he conversed with his lost love. Hodgson asked Carrington to keep this a secret.

American psychic investigator Gardner Murphy who attended three years of séance sittings with Piper concluded they were "uneventful and lacking in the types of phenomena which characterized the zenith of her career."

=== Controls ===
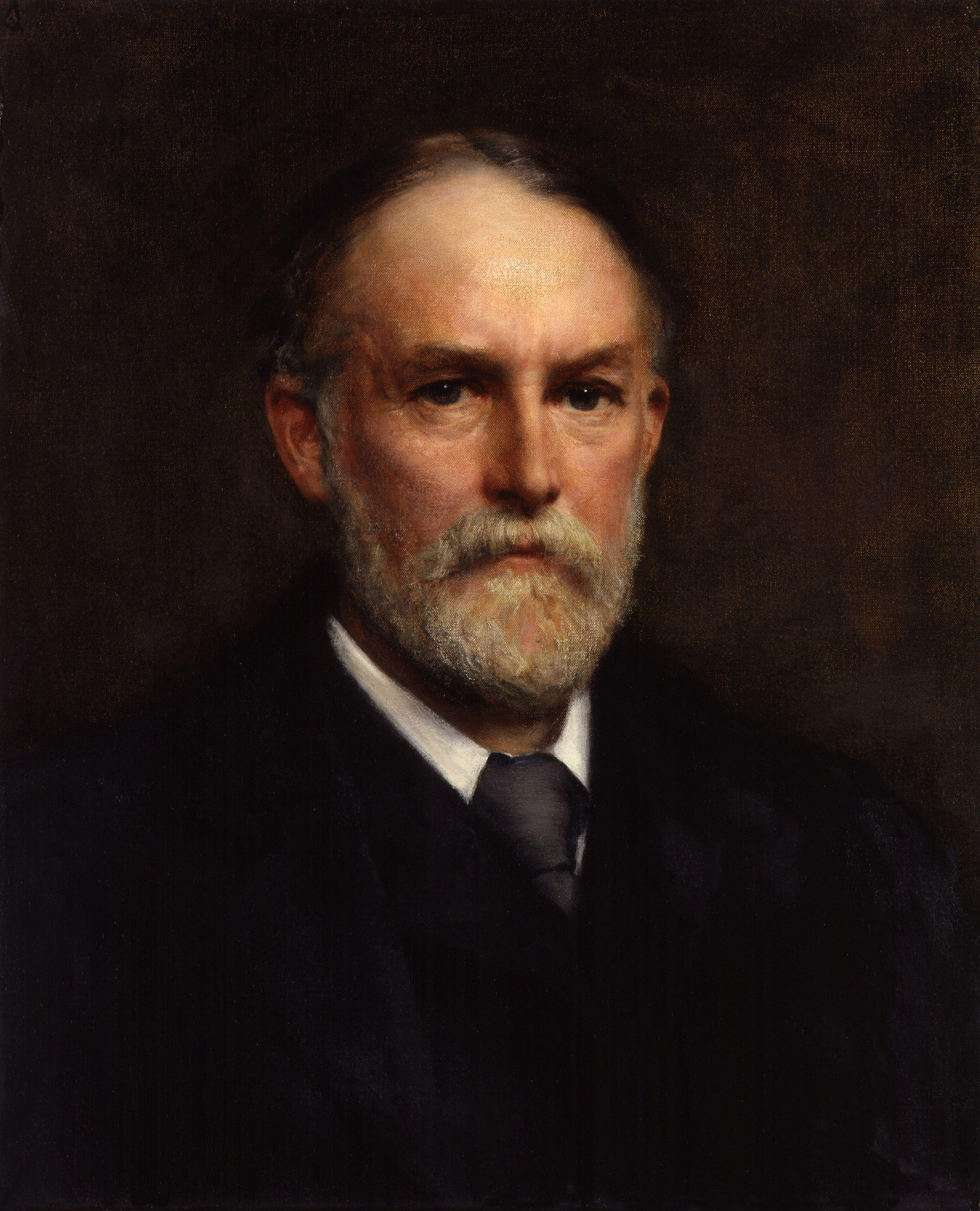
Frederic Myers like all of Piper's controls failed to prove his identity.

As with other mediums of the era, Piper claimed the use of spirit guides or "controls" in trance. In some of Piper's early sittings her control, supposedly Walter Scott, made absurd statements about the planets. He claimed beautiful creatures live inside Venus and the Sun is populated by "dreadful looking creatures" which he described as monkeys that live in caves made out of sand and mud.

Among her controls was a personality referred to as G.P., who claimed to be George Pellew (1859–1892), a writer who had died in New York City and a friend of Richard Hodgson. In 1888 Pellew had attended a séance sitting with Piper. After he had died Hodgson claimed that Pellew communicated through Piper, however the family members and friends of George denied this. Andrew Lang wrote that when alive George Pellew was a scholar and metaphysician but the Pellew control of Piper had forgotten his Greek and philosophy and when asked for proof of his identity was incoherent or wholly mistaken. A cousin declared that the impersonation was "beneath contempt" and his brother said the communications ascribed to George were "utter drivel and inanity".

Another control was called "Phinuit" who was purportedly a French doctor. Phinuit's French was limited to salutations like "Bonjour" and "Au revoir" and had little apparent knowledge either of the French language or of medicine. According to some accounts, medical people were surprised Phinuit did not know the French or Latin names for the many remedies Piper advised for her sitters, and Phinuit's historical existence could not be verified by SPR investigations. Psychical researchers were not impressed by the control and William James described the Phinuit communications as "tiresome twaddle". Among other spirit guides who supposedly were assuming control of Piper were a young Indian girl named Chlorine, Martin Luther, Commodore Cornelius Vanderbilt, Henry Longfellow, Abraham Lincoln, and George Washington.

On the subject of Piper and her controls Tony Cornell wrote that "Dr. Phinuit, Mrs. Piper's original control, was never able to provide any real evidence of his identity. Her later control "Imperator" did nothing but waffle and the control "Julius Caesar" and some others also ought to be regarded as no more than the personification of the nonsense at which they were so adept."

In 1888, psychical researcher Edmund Gurney died and it was alleged he communicated through Piper. William James strongly rejected this claim. The Reverend Mr. Sutton and his wife who had lost their daughter Katherine (Kakie) six weeks previously, attended a séance sitting with Piper on December 8, 1893. Piper described their daughter, gave her nickname and told how she had died of a throat infection, she also gave the nicknames of the little girl's brother and sister. John G. Taylor suggested that the information Piper gave could naturally be explained if she had read an obituary notice in the local newspaper. Taylor also suggested Piper may have picked up clues from the sitters about the girl's nickname. Piper's controls made many inaccurate statements. Eleanor Sidgwick had a sitting with Piper in 1899 and her "spirit control" Moses said that a great world war was going to take place. Germany would have no part in it and that it would be caused by Russia and France against England. In another sitting Piper's control "Walter Scott" claimed to have visited all the planets and when asked if he had seen a planet further away from Saturn answered "Mercury!".

The medium Rosina Thompson was described as a British counterpart to Piper. After the death of Frederic Myers in 1901, Piper claimed to receive messages from Myers for his widow. The messages were warnings that Thompson was a fraudulent medium. Before his death Myers had left a message in a sealed envelope; Piper's control did not reveal the message. In 1906 the Myers control was completely baffled when given a message in Latin by a séance sitter, and took three months to get the meaning of the message. This was unlike Myers, as whilst alive he was a classicist who knew Latin.

In her séances the controls of Piper would tell the sitters what they wanted to hear, for example Richard Hodgson a critic of Theosophy attended the séances of Piper and her control told him that Helena Blavatsky's "spirit was in the deepest part of hell". Piper's control told Hodgson he would get married, have two children and have a long life but Hodgson died a few months later, unmarried and childless. After the death of Hodgson between December 1905 and the beginning of 1908 Piper held about seventy séances during which the spirit of Hodgson was said to have communicated through her. However the control of Piper sounded nothing like Hodgson. According to Joseph McCabe "when Hodgson died in 1905 and left a large amount of manuscript in cipher, she could not get the least clue to it. When friends put test questions to the spirit of Hodgson about his early life in Australia, the answers were all wrong." The Hodgson control was asked the name of his schoolmaster in Melbourne but failed to give the correct answer, Hodgson's sister who was sent the messages was not convinced they were from Hodgson. Before he died Hodgson had written a test letter, and claimed that if he was to communicate through Piper he would reveal the contents inside the letter. Piper's Hodgson control failed to reveal the test letter.

The psychologist Joseph Jastrow wrote regarding the Hodgson control of Piper:

Mrs. Piper pretends to be controlled by the actual disembodied Richard Hodgson. Not only, however, does the latter fail to prove his identity, but he is suggestible, ignorant, inconsequential and Piperian. With alacrity he summoned from the spirit-world wholly fictitious personages, as well as the shades of the known departed; he fell into the most simple logical traps, and through Mrs. Piper's organism exhibited pique and ill-temper at being exposed, -quite out of the role of the shrewd exposer of mystery that Hodgson was.

In an experiment to test if Piper's controls were purely fictitious the psychologist G. Stanley Hall invented a niece called Bessie Beals and asked Piper's Hodgson control to get in touch with it. Bessie appeared, answered questions and accepted Dr. Hall as her uncle.

=== Dean Connor ===
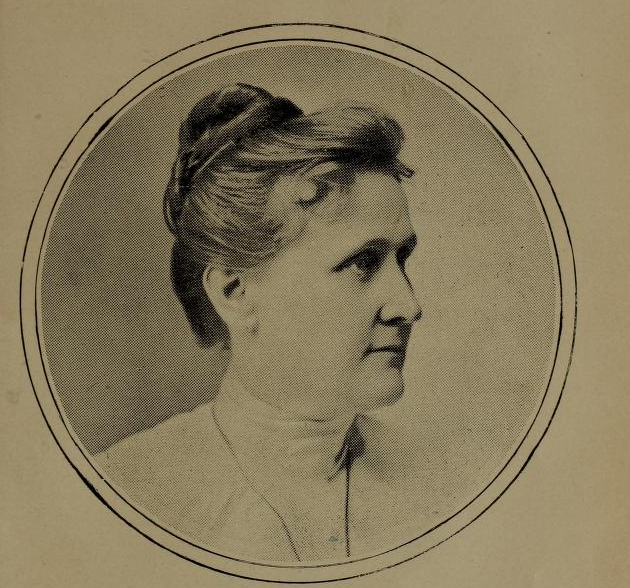
Piper

In February, 1895 Dean Bridgman Connor, a young electrician, died from typhoid fever in an American hospital in Mexico. His parents, in Burlington, Vermont. were notified of his death. Connor's father claimed to have experienced a dream that his son was not dead, but alive and held captive in Mexico. There was publicity over the incident and Richard Hodgson consulted Piper, and she gave several séances. It was alleged that Piper's spirit control claimed Conner was alive in a lunatic asylum kept by a "Dr. Cintz".

Anthony Philpott, a journalist for The Boston Globe, travelled to Mexico to investigate the incident but could not find a lunatic asylum or Dr. Cintz as described by Piper's control. Philpott visited the hospital where Connor was reported to have died and interviewed the nurse Helen Smith (Mrs. F. U. Winn) in Tuxpan, Veracruz who attended Connor and she confirmed he had died of typhoid fever in the hospital. On his return to Boston, Hodgson would not believe Philpott and insisted that Connor was alive and that if he had the money he would go to Mexico and find him. Philpott offered to pay his expenses and advertised the offer, however Hodgson declined the offer and did not go to Mexico. Due to the incorrect information the Dean Connor case has been described as an incident that has cast doubt on Piper's alleged ability to contact the dead.

=== 1901 Statement ===
In 1901, Piper spoke to the New York Herald who published her remarks in an article called "Mrs. Piper's Plain Statement". In the article she announced her separation from the SPR, denied being a Spiritualist and wrote "I must truthfully say that I do not believe that spirits of the dead have spoken through me when I have been in the trance state". She also said that she believed telepathy may explain her mediumship and that her "spirit controls" were "an unconscious expression of my subliminal self". Pipers statement caused a "sensation" amongst some SPR members such as Richard Hodgson who firmly believed she had the ability to contact the dead, and they later made claims of "misquotation" and that her statement had been made in a "transient mood". On October 25, 1901, Piper stated in the Boston Advertiser: "I did not make any such statement as that published in the New York Herald to the effect that spirits of the departed do not control me ... My opinion is to-day as it was eighteen years ago. Spirits of the departed may have controlled me and they may not. I confess that I do not know. I have not changed ... I make no change in my relations."

== Skeptical reception ==
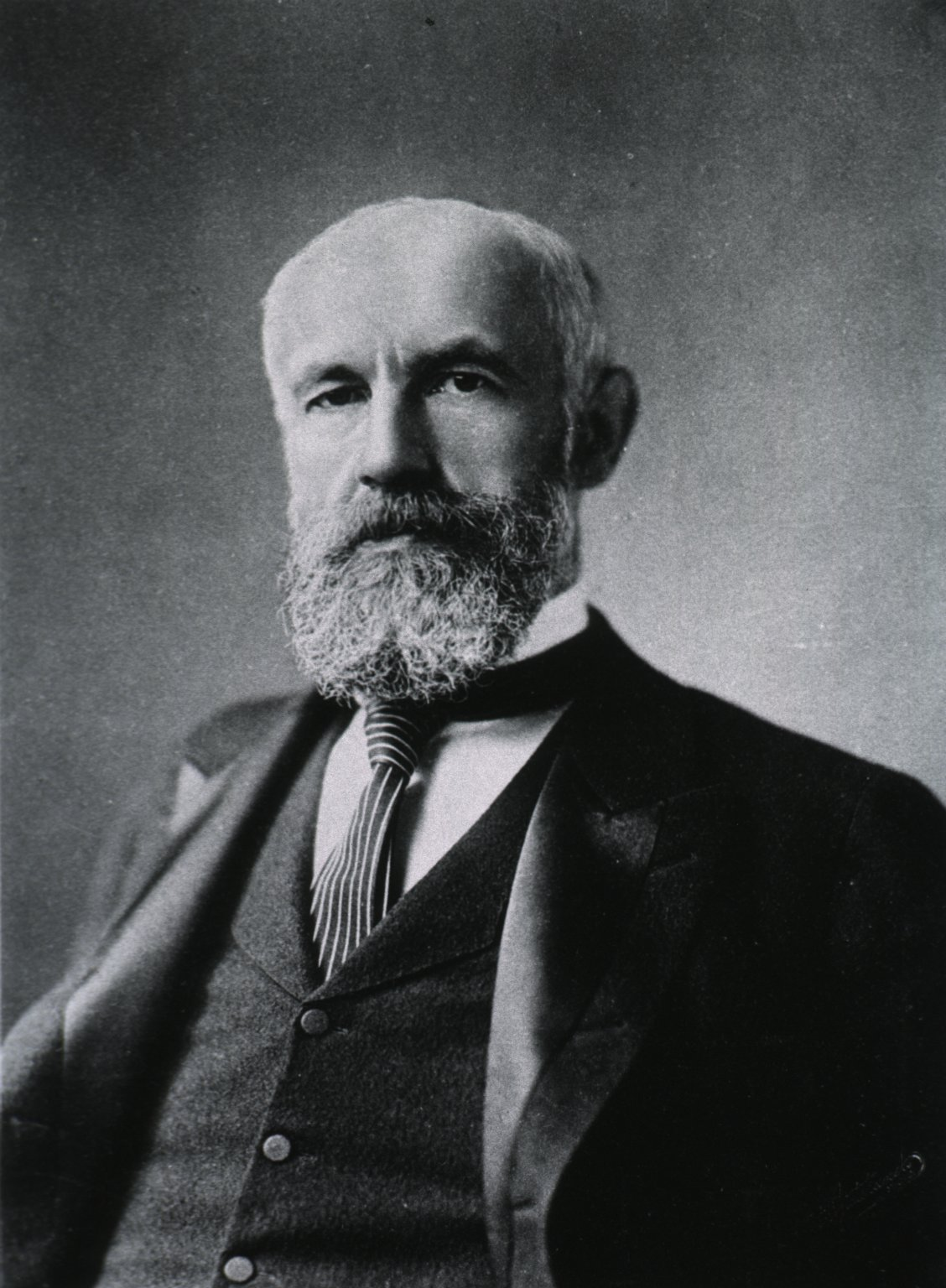
G. Stanley Hall from his psychological tests on Piper revealed that her "controls" were fictitious and not spirits of the dead.

Psychologists G. Stanley Hall and Amy Tanner, who observed some of the trances, explained the phenomena in terms of the subconscious mind harboring various personalities that pretended to be spirits or controls. In their view, Piper had subconsciously absorbed information that she later regurgitated as messages from "spirits" in her trances. Edmund Smith Conklin in his book Principles of Abnormal Psychology (1927) also explained Piper's mediumship through psychology without recourse to the paranormal.

On the subject of Piper the British hypnotist Simeon Edmunds wrote:

In contrast to the extravagant claims made by the vast majority of mediums, Mrs Piper herself was not convinced that the information obtained through her came from discarnate sources or that her 'controls' were, in fact, the spirits they purported to be. One of her early controls, who called himself Phinuit, was obviously fictitious, for although he claimed to be the spirit of a French doctor who had lived in Marseilles, he knew but little of French and still less of medicine. All statements to verify his statements met with failure. One investigator invented a dead niece whom he named Bessie Beale, and requested Mrs Piper's control to contact her spirit. Messages from the non-existent 'spirit' were duly given.

In 1889, George Darwin attended two séance sittings with Piper anonymously. The control of Piper mentioned names, but according to Darwin "not a single name or person was given correctly, although perhaps nine of ten were named." At the end of the first séance Darwin and Frederic Myers were talking on the stairs outside of the séance room whilst Piper was left alone inside. Myers mentioned Darwin's name in a clear voice whilst the séance room door was open. In the second séance Piper mentioned the name Darwin.

Walter Leaf who attended séances with Piper testified to her "equally unsatisfactory sittings, leading to equally justifiable incredulity on the part of the sitter."

Piper stayed at the house of Oliver Lodge and his family for a fortnight. In a séance Piper's control mentioned to Lodge that a locket had been given to his wife by her father. Lodge believed that Piper had obtained this information supernaturally, however, the psychiatrist Charles Arthur Mercier revealed that Piper could have easily examined the possessions of the Lodge family and seen the locket as she was staying with them and Lodge's wife had also sometimes worn it.

The philosopher William Romaine Newbold who witnessed several séances with Piper wrote "In all the years of Mrs. Piper's mediumship, she made no revelation to science, her efforts in astronomy were utterly childish, her prophecy untrue. She never has revealed one scrap of useful knowledge. She never could reveal the contents of a test letter left by Dr. Hodgson."

Chapman Cohen noted that the controls of Piper were obviously fictitious as it was claimed she communicated with the fictional character Adam Bede from George Eliot's novel. In 1915, Eleanor Sidgwick wrote a 657-page report on Piper which concluded her trance control "is not, as it professes to be, an independent spirit using Mrs. Piper's organism, but some phase or element of Mrs. Piper's own consciousness."

Physician Antônio da Silva Mello also considered Piper to be a fraud, he noted that "all her revelations were nothing more than guesses and interpretations, often vague and with a high percentage of error."

=== Piper's maid ===
William James held séances with Piper and was impressed by some of the details he was given. However, according to Massimo Polidoro a maid in the household of William James was friendly with a maid in Piper's house and this may have been a source of information that Piper used for private details about James. Bibliographers Frederick Burkhardt and Fredson Bowers who compiled the works of James wrote "It is thus possible that Mrs. Piper's knowledge of the James family was acquired from the gossip of servants and that the whole mystery rests on the failure of the people upstairs to realize that servants [downstairs] also have ears." Furthermore, the Jameses sat so frequently, and over such a period of time, with Mrs. Piper that she even stayed at their New Hampshire residence for a week in the fall of 1889 bringing William's objectivity into question.

=== Tricks ===
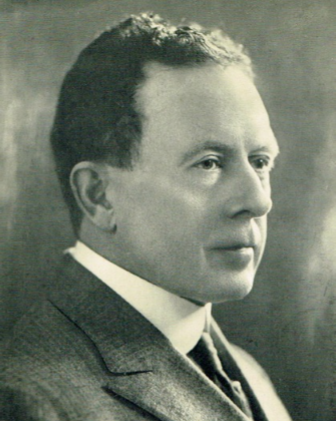
Magician Joseph Rinn who observed Piper, concluded she was a fraud.

The physiologist Ivor Lloyd Tuckett examined Piper's mediumship in detail and wrote it could be explained by "muscle-reading, fishing, guessing, hints obtained in the sitting, knowledge surreptitiously obtained, knowledge acquired in the interval between sittings and lastly, facts already within Mrs. Piper's knowledge."

Horace Howard Furness attended a séance with Piper and concluded that the she had feigned her trances. During the séance Furness caught Piper with her eyes open, looking at some flowers which he had placed in the room.

Thomas W. M. Lund recalled that before a séance with Piper he had told another sitter about his son's illness and his wife's plans "within earshot of Mrs. Piper." During the séance Piper's control mentioned his statements. Lund suggested that Piper was not unconscious during the séance and that she had used clever guess work and other mentalist tricks.

Irish anatomist Alexander Macalister attended a séance sitting wrote that apart from one common guess Piper got nothing correct and that her trance mediumship was a poor imposture. Another sitter Thomas Barkworth who held the hand of Piper in one of her séances accused her of practicing muscle reading. Martin Gardner wrote "Mrs. Piper liked to hold a client's hand throughout a sitting, or even to place the hand against her forehead. This made it easy to detect muscular reactions even when a sitter remained silent."

Martin Gardner wrote in his essays "How Mrs. Piper Bamboozled William James" and "William James and Mrs. Piper" that records of Piper's séances clearly suggest she may have feigned being unconscious and used the techniques of cold reading and "fishing", where vague statements were followed by more precise information based on how sitters reacted. Gardner reports that when Phinuit made a mistake he would claim deafness and leave, and that Piper was unable to discern between real and fictitious information given to her.

Psychologist C. E. M. Hansel has written that Piper learnt little French at school which explained her "control" Phinuit not knowing more than a few French words. Hansel wrote it was not surprising that inquiries in France revealed no record of his birth, life, or death. Skeptic John Sladek wrote that Piper's controls "spoke nonsense, fished for clues, and knew next to nothing about their own lives on earth. These included a Frenchman [Phinuit] who, curiously enough, could speak no more French than Mrs Piper had learned at school, which was very, very little."

Joseph McCabe has suggested that Richard Hodgson who investigated Piper was caught in an act of deception. Hodgson had claimed Professor Fiske from his séance with Piper was "absolutely convinced" Piper's control was the real George Pellew, however, when Pellew's brother contacted Fiske about it, he replied it was "a lie" as Piper had been "silent or entirely wrong" on all his questions. However, Alan Gauld has disputed this, commenting that Hodgson in the Proceedings of the Society for Psychical Research acknowledged the negative attitude of Fiske and did not personally find "the communications as having evidential value".

In 1898, the magician Joseph Rinn attended a séance with Piper. During the séance, Piper held the hands of Hodgson and Hyslop. Rinn suggested that Piper was a practitioner of muscle reading. He had set a trap for Piper by inventing the fictitious name "Esther Horton" which Piper's alleged trance control accepted as a real person. Many of the statements "Phinuit" gave were nonsensical. Rinn commented that Hyslop and Hodgson were credulous investigators and that their methods of investigating Piper were unscientific. He was not invited to any other séances with Piper.

Magician Henry Gordon has written that Piper "was exposed as a fraud" and she utilized the same methods as other mental mediums.

== See also ==
- Gladys Osborne Leonard
- William Stainton Moses
