= John Matthews Manly =

American professor of English literature (1865–1940)

- Born: September 2, 1865
- Died: April 2, 1940 (aged 74)

Academic background
- Education: Staunton Military Academy; Greenville Military Institute; Furman University; Harvard University

John Matthews Manly (September 2, 1865 – April 2, 1940) was an American professor of English literature and philology at the University of Chicago. Manly specialized in the study of the works of William Shakespeare and Geoffrey Chaucer. His eight-volume work, The Text of the Canterbury Tales (1940), written in collaboration with his former student Edith Rickert, has been cited as a definitive study of Chaucer's works.

== Early life and education ==
Manley was born in Virginia, the son of Charles Manly, a Baptist minister and university president. He attended Staunton Military Academy and Greenville Military Institute. At the age of 18, Manly earned a master's degree in Mathematics from Furman University. In 1890, he received a PhD from Harvard University in Philology, a non-departmental field for which he created his own curriculum.

== Career ==
In 1884, at the age of 19, Manly accepted a position at William Jewell College teaching Mathematics, which he held for five years. After taking his doctorate in 1890 and teaching Anglo-Saxon at Radcliffe for a year, Manly accepted a call to Brown University and became one of the chief members of the English staff there, until 1898. He then accepted the department chair in English at the University of Chicago, which he maintained until retirement.

Manly was elected to the American Philosophical Society in 1912. During World War I, he served as cryptanalyst in the Military Intelligence Division. He joined MI-8 in October 1917 at age 51.

He gave the 1926 Warton Lecture on English Poetry. In 1931, he published a paper in the journal Speculum disproving William Romaine Newbold's deciphering of the Voynich Manuscript.

== Cryptanalytic career ==
=== Self training, 1894 to 1915 ===
Manly began studying cryptography on his own in the 1890s prior to any institutional involvement. Over the next two decades, he read a substantial portion of European cipher literature. The Manly Papers preserve his typed bibliography of cipher manuals including Gaëtan de Viaris's L'art de déchiffrer les dépêches secrètes (Paris, 1895) and Auguste Kerckhoffs's articles in the Journal des sciences militaires (1883). Manly also kept index cards summarizing diplomatic cipher correspondence from the Tudor and Stuart eras preserved in the British Library's Harleian Manuscripts. One surviving card cites a 14 March 1587 letter from William Brooke, 10th Baron Cobham, to Sir Francis Walsingham concerning the Spanish Armada; another catalogues the Quintin cipher of Mary, Queen of Scots. Drawing on examination of these surviving cards alongside Manly's contemporaneous working materials for the Chaucer Life-Records project, Katherine Ellison and Susan M. Kim argue that the same index-card apparatus was applied to both inquiries, and that Manly and his colleague Edith Rickert used a single methodological infrastructure for their philological and cryptanalytic work.

=== Riverbank Laboratories, 1916 ===
In 1916, George Fabyan recruited Manly to Riverbank Laboratories in Geneva, Illinois in order to complete cryptographic work on Elizabeth Wells Gallup's claim that Francis Bacon had embedded confessions of Shakespearean authorship in the 1623 Folio using biliteral cipher. Riverbank is regarded by historians of cryptography as the birth of American institutional cryptography practice. The biliteral cipher discussed in Bacon's De Augmentis Scientiarum encodes each English letter as a five character sequence of two symbols, hidden in printed text by setting the same letters in two different type faces. Manly drafted an article titled "Chapters from a Lay Book on the Biliteral Cipher" with numbered chapters on two-letter ciphers, the biliteral letter cipher, the type of spirit cipher, and the book cipher. At Riverbank, Manly worked on a printed apparatus called the Bi-formed Alphabet Classifier, a comparative letter form chart with detachable guide strips and printed Directions for Use, intended to sort each printed letter in the 1623 folio into one of two type-families. Manly also produced photographs of pages from early English printed books for typographic analysis including a leaf on the Prologue to Troilus and Cressida. The cryptography historian John F. Dooley argues that Manly was retained at Riverbank specifically in a skeptical role. Manly ultimately rejected the Gallup-Fabyan reading on the grounds that Gallup's decipherment method, applied to texts she had not selected, generated equally valid "Bacon confessions" in works that postdated Bacon by more than a century including Alexander Pope's translation of the Iliad and Edmund Spenser's Faerie Queene. The method, in other words, did not hold up. Scholars maintain that Manly's work at Riverbank led to his recruitment into cryptographic work for the U.S. military in 1917.

=== Military Intelligence Section 8, 1917 to 1919 ===
In October 1917, the U.S. Army recruited Manly to MI-8, the Cipher Bureau under Herbert Yardley. Manly served as second in command of MI-8. Manly also recruited Edith Rickert as well as other University of Chicago colleagues to the bureau. In February 1918, the German agent Lothar Witzke, traveling under the alias Pablo Waberski, was arrested at the Mexican border, carrying a 424-letter cryptogram sewn into the lining of his clothing. Manly identified the message as a columnar transposition cipher in German and he and Rickert deciphered the text after three days of continuous work. Manly testified at Witzke's hearing in 1918, and based upon Manly's decipherment, Witzke was convicted and sentenced to death for being charged with espionage. In 1927, Manly was paid to write twelve articles for Collier's magazine intended to introduce MI-8's wartime work to a general audience. Collier's editors ultimately rejected the manuscripts on the grounds that they were too academic for the magazine's readership. The articles were thought lost until Dooley rediscovered the manuscripts in 2012 in the William F. Friedman Collection at the George C. Marshall Foundation Library, and published them in full in his 2016 book Codes, Ciphers and Spies.

=== Postwar Voynich work and the 1931 Speculum paper ===
After the First World War, Manly returned to the University of Chicago and continued private cryptographic work. The most widely cited element of his post-war cryptography is his refutation of William Romaine Newbold's theory that the Voynich Manuscript was a coded work by the English friar Roger Bacon. Newbold first presented the theory in 1921 during a lecture, and in 1928, posthumous to Newbold, his contemporary Roland Kent put forth the theory in a manuscript titled "The Cipher of Roger Bacon." Newbold maintained that characters in the Voynich manuscript had little meaning, and in fact, the actual text was encoded in shorthand markings within each character, visible only under magnification. In passages of Latin attributed to Bacon, he claimed to have found the same markings. The Manly Papers collection preserves Manly's working materials he used to respond to Newbold. The collection also preserves hand-drawn comparative charts of seven numeral systems drawn from Gentleman's Magazine and from the seventeenth-century English mathematician John Wallis's transcriptions, including a row labeled "Figures of Johannes de Sacro Bosco." Manly published "Roger Bacon and the Voynich Ms" in Speculum in July 1931. In it, he argued that the markings Newbold had read as shorthand were in fact cracks in the dried ink on vellum, and that Newbold's claimed decipherments could not be reproduced. M. E. D'Imperio's 1978 NSA monograph identifies Manly's 1931 paper as the standard refutation of Newbold's theory.

== Selected publications ==
- as editor: English Poetry (1170–1892). Ginn & Co. 1907.
- with Edith Rickert: The Writing of English (1st ed.). Henry Holt & Co. 1919.; Manly, John Matthews; Rickert, Edith (1920). 1920 2nd edition.
