= Henry Coombe-Tennant =

Henry Coombe-Tennant was a decorated World War Two soldier who worked for both the Special Operations Executive and MI6, before becoming a Benedictine monk.

== Early life and education ==
Coombe-Tennant was born in Neath in 1913 as the result of an affair between Winifred Coombe Tennant and Gerald Balfour. The pair believed that, with help from the spirit world, Coombe-Tennant would be the next messiah. Coombe-Tennant only learnt of his parents' plan in the 1940s.

Coombe-Tennant was educated at Eton, during which time he played correspondence chess with a mental health inpatient. In May 1931 he was awarded a holiday task prize.

Coombe-Tennant studied moral sciences at Trinity College Cambridge and was awarded a double first.

He enjoyed hunting, shooting and was an accomplished pianist.

== Professional career ==
=== Military career ===
In 1936 Coombe-Tennant joined the Welsh Guards. When the Second World War broke out, in 1939, Coombe-Tennant served in the Netherlands and Boulogne.

In May 1940, Coombe-Tennant helped keep a vital road to the port of the Hook of Holland open. This helped to enable the Dutch royal family and government to escape. Several weeks later, Coombe-Tennant was involved in delaying the German army at Boulogne. These efforts helped hundreds of thousands of Allied troops escape at Dunkirk.

Coombe-Tennant was eventually captured and sent to Warburg prisoner-of-war camp in Germany. During his time in the camp, Coombe-Tennant helped to raise the morale of his fellow prisoners by playing the piano. In 1942, Coombe-Tennant, along with 40 other prisoners, escaped Warburg. Of the 40 escapees, Henry was one of only three who made it back to Britain.

Following his return to Britain, Coombe-Tennant left the Welsh Guards and joined the Special Operations Executive. Following the D-Day landings, Coombe-Tennant was posted to German occupied territory and helped to disrupt train lines and enemy positions. Coombe-Tennant was awarded the Military Cross and the Croix de Guerre by the French Government.

When the war ended, Coombe-Tennant continued to work for the British Secret Service. In the late 1940s he was based in Palestine before moving to Iraq in 1959. While working in Iraq, Coombe-Tennant experienced what he later referred to as significant physical and mental hardship, which ultimately led him to take up holy orders.

=== Monastic work ===
In 1960 Coombe-Tennant returned to Britain and joined the Catholic church. In 1965 Coombe-Tennant became a Benedictine monk at Downside Abbey, near Bath, and took Joseph as his name.

== Death ==
Coombe-Tennant died on the 6 November 1989 at the age of 76. His funeral was held at Downside Abbey.
