= Evan Walters =

Welsh artist (1892–1951)

Evan John Walters (27 November 1892 – 14 March 1951) was a Welsh artist.

== Biography ==
Walters was born in the Welcome Inn, between Llangyfelach and Mynydd-bach, in south Wales, to nonconformist and Welsh-speaking parents, Thomas Walters (1861-1946) and Elizabeth (Thomas)(1866-1942). The area was partly rural and partly industrial. He trained first as a painter and decorator in Morriston, Swansea, but soon progressed to the Swansea School of Art, the Regent Street Polytechnic in London and the Royal Academy Schools. He emigrated to the United States in 1915, where he was conscripted into the war effort and worked as a camouflage painter. After the Armistice he returned to Wales and established himself as a portrait painter.

His first solo exhibition at the Glynn Vivian Art Gallery in Swansea in 1920 contained, among other works three pictures related to the local mining communities and proved a turning point in his career. The exhibition attracted the attention of Winifred Coombe Tennant, who would become Walters's most important patron. After meeting Walters to commission him to paint her portrait and portraits of her husband and children, she described him as "A young dark typical Welshman. Very intelligent and pleasant... He has genius." His fame in Wales grew when he became joint winner of a number of art prizes at the 1926 National Eisteddfod of Wales in Swansea, where Augustus John was one of the two adjudicators. Walters had designed the poster advertising the Eisteddfod but the entire print run was pulped due to a perceived sexual innuendo in the design. Winifred Coombe Tennant managed to save a single copy. That year he was also given a one-man exhibition in the Dorothy Warren Gallery in London, where his industrial subject manner was embraced by left-leaning critics in the wake of the General Strike. This and John's opinion that "a new genius had emerged" were widely reported in the London press. He was characterised as a "collier-artist", though he had never worked in the coal industry. During the General Strike, Walters painted Welsh Funeral Hymn showing four naked youths, marked with stigmata, on a coal tip with a choir and chapel in the background.

By the spring of 1936 Walters had developed a theory of perception that was to have a calamitous outcome for him. This was an investigation into "double vision" or to use the scientific term, physiological diplopia. His experimentation with producing "double vision" paintings became almost an obsession and an exhibition of November 1936 at the Coolings Gallery, London of these works was not a success and not one of the twenty- two pictures was sold. Walters wrote an essay on his ideas, The Third Dimension, and continued to champion the theory, without any success, for the rest of his life.
