= Rosina Thompson =

British trance medium (born 1868)

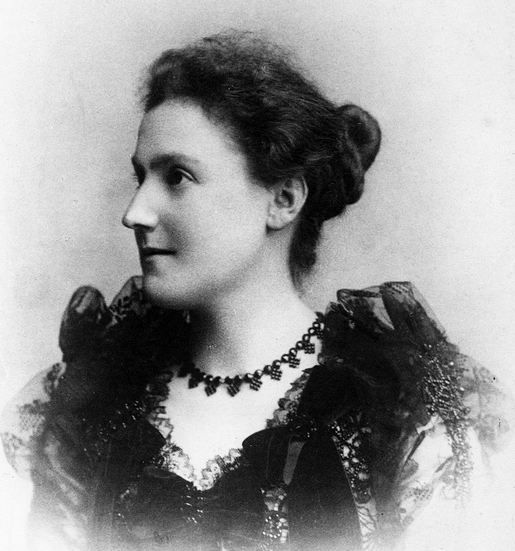
Rosina Thompson

Rosina Thompson (born, 1868) was a British trance medium.

Thompson worked as a medium at Hertford Lodge in Battersea, London. She came to the attention of the Society for Psychical Research and performed séance experiments for them from 1898 onward. Thompson was originally a physical medium, however as physical mediumship was exposed as fraudulent the psychical researcher Frederic W. H. Myers persuaded Thompson to take up trance mediumship. Some psychical researchers were not impressed with her mediumship as it was discovered that her trances were not genuine. Richard Hodgson had six sittings with Thompson and came to the conclusion she was a fraud. Hodgson claimed that Thompson had access to documents and information about her séance sitters.

The medium Leonora Piper was described as an American counterpart to Thompson. According to William James after the death of Frederic Myers, Piper claimed to receive messages from Myers for his widow. The messages were warnings that Thompson was a fraudulent medium.

In spiritualist literature, Thompson has been referred to by other aliases such as Rosalie Thompson and Mrs. Edmund Thompson.
