= William Romaine Newbold =

American philosopher (1865–1926)

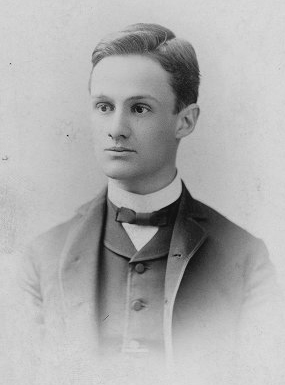
- Portrait from University of Pennsylvania, 1887
- Born: November 20, 1865; Wilmington, Delaware
- Died: September 26, 1926 (aged 60); Philadelphia, Pennsylvania
- Occupation: Philosopher
- Years active: 1892-1926
- Notable work: The Cipher of Roger Bacon

William Romaine Newbold (November 20, 1865 – September 26, 1926) was an American philosopher who held the Adam Seybert Professor of Intellectual and Moral Philosophy chair at the University of Pennsylvania from 1907 to 1926. Newbold was considered an authority on the psychology of religion, Christian Gnosticism, and cryptography. Newbold became most noted for his decoding of the Voynich Manuscript, later disproven.

== Early life ==
Newbold was born 1865 in Wilmington, Delaware to William Allibone Newbold and Martha S Bailey. He graduated from the University of Pennsylvania in 1887.

== Career ==
In 1919 he began an analysis of the Voynich Manuscript at the request of Wilfrid Voynich. After his initial study Newbold quickly agreed with Voynich that the manuscript had been authored by the English polymath Roger Bacon. During the next several years, Newbold developed a complex system to decipher it and his analysis, The Cipher of Roger Bacon, was published two years after his death. Newbold's theory was entirely disproved in a 1931 paper by his friend John Matthews Manly and it is now mostly disregarded.

Newbold was interested in parapsychology. In the early 1890s he attended séances with the medium Leonora Piper.

William also had an interest in genealogy. He was a descendant of the Newbold family of Hackenthorpe, now part of the city of Sheffield. He paid a visit to the village shortly before his death, where he visited Hackenthorpe Hall, built by his ancestor John Newbold (d. 1697). His research was used to produce a book.

Newbold was elected to the American Philosophical Society in 1909.

== Personal life ==
Newbold died suddenly in Philadelphia on 26 September 1926 of acute indigestion.

== Publications ==
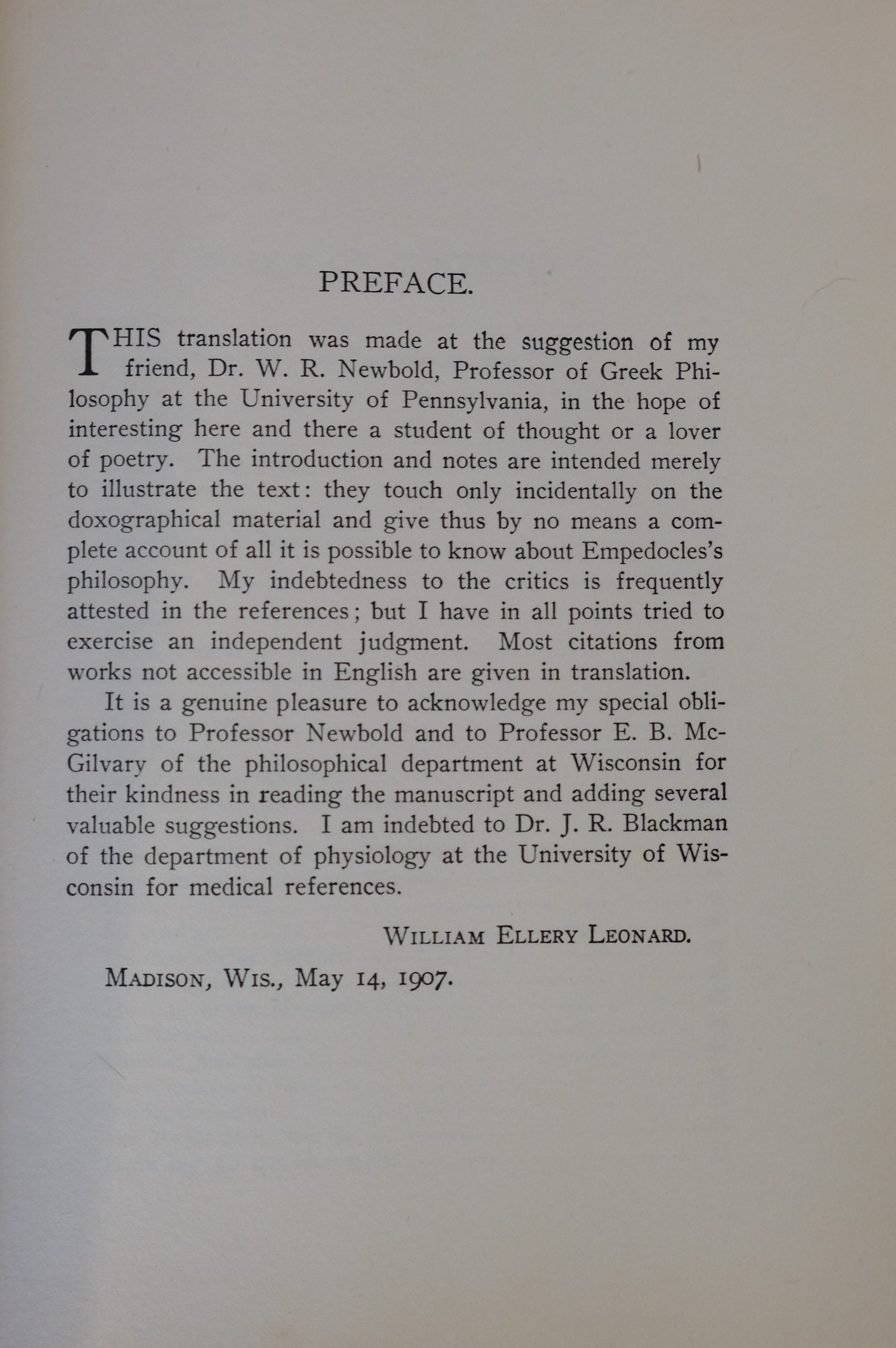
Preface to a 1908 copy of "The fragments of Empedocles," translated to English by William Ellery Leonard. Leonard dedicated the book to Newbold.

Books

- The Voynich Roger Bacon Manuscript (1921)
- The Cipher of Roger Bacon (1928)

Papers

- Newbold, W. R. (1896). Sub-Conscious Reasoning. Proceedings of the Society for Psychical Research 12: 11–20.
- Newbold, W. R. (1898). A Further Record of Observations of Certain Phenomena of Trance. Proceedings of the Society for Psychical Research 14: 6-49.
