= Gertrude Ogden Tubby =

American teacher and psychical researcher

Gertude Ogden Tubby
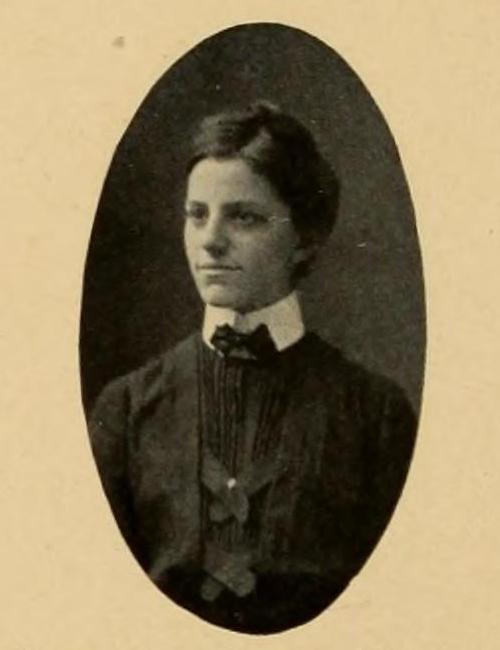
- Born: June 18, 1878; Kingston, New York
- Died: 1967 (aged 88–89)
- Education: Smith College, Massachusetts
- Occupation(s): Teacher, author, psychical researcher

Gertrude Ogden Tubby (18 June 1878-1967) was an American teacher, author, and psychical researcher. She was the first female secretary of the American Society for Psychical Research.

== Life ==
Gertrude Ogden Tubby was born on 18 June 1878 at Kingston, New York. She studied at Smith College, Northampton, Massachusetts, where she obtained her B.S. in 1902. There, she was a member of the Philosophical Society and the Chapel Choir, and an editor of the yearbook. After graduating, she was Managing Editor of the Smith Alumnae Quarterly.

In 1908, Tubby edited and published the novelist Donna R. Cole's Chums: Or, An Experiment in Economics, a "volume of contemporaneous history" (under the pseudonym D. R. C.): "sane wholesome stories of a number of living women and girls who have met and overcome various obstacles in life." This was described in The New York Times as containing "several stories relating to the experiences of several people involved in slum work."

In 1907, Tubby became the special research assistant to James H. Hyslop, President of the American Society for Psychical Research (ASPR). She had first heard Hyslop lecture the previous year, and offered her services to him. As Hyslop's assistant, Tubby investigated a wide range of psychic phenomena, including mediumship, telepathy, clairvoyance, psychokinesis, and survival. In 1910, she travelled to Europe to study psychic research there. She remained as Hyslop's research assistant until his death in 1920. Afterwards, Tubby continued to work for the ASPR as a secretary, and edited its Journal until 1924.

In 1925, the Society split, with some former members establishing the Boston Society for Psychic Research.

Tubby contributed a number of articles to the ASPR's Journal and Proceedings, and in 1935 published Psychics and Mediums, A Handbook for Students. She also co-wrote a play, A Boy Who Lived Twice. Of Psychics and Mediums, the Edinburgh Evening News wrote:

She brings to her task 17 years of experience in psychic research, having for that period, first as the assistant secretary, and then the secretary, of the American Society for Psychical Research. personally conducted and recorded more than 4000 mediumistic seances. Miss Tubby has an orderly mind which enables her to clarify the matter with which she deals and to give it scientific classification. Her advice on such subjects as the individual development of mediumship, and how to conduct a psychic seance is lucidly and methodically set forth.

Tubby had control of Hyslop's papers, which she ultimately donated to the Spiritual Frontiers Fellowship (now the International Spiritual Frontiers Fellowship). After Hyslop's death, she gathered communications claimed to be from him from a variety of mediums. In 1929, she published James H. Hyslop—X, His Book, in which these were presented.

Gertrude Tubby died in July 1967.

== Bibliography ==
- Chums: Or, An Experiment in Economics (publisher/editor, by Donna R. Cole, 1908)
- Faith-Hope, Child of the Slums (publisher/editor, by Donna R. Cole, 1909)
- True Tales of the Weird: a record of personal experiences of the supernatural by Sidney Dickinson (contributor; 1920)
- James H. Hyslop—X, His Book (1929)
