= Beatrice Fry Hyslop =

American historian

- Born: 10 April 1899; New York, US
- Died: 23 July 1973 (aged 74); Rochester, New York, US
- Education: Barnard School for Girls
- Alma mater: Mount Holyoke College (B.A.); Columbia University (A.M., Ph.D.)
- Occupation: Historian
- Parent: James H. Hyslop
- Awards: Phi Beta Kappa

Beatrice Fry Hyslop (10 April 1899 – 23 July 1973) was an American historian of France.

== Life and work ==
Beatrice Fry Hyslop was born at home in New York on 10 April 1899 to James H. Hyslop, professor of philosophy and ethics at Columbia College and founder of the American Society for Psychical Research. Her mother, Mary Fry (Hall) Hyslop, daughter of a wealthy Philadelphia merchant, was a pianist. She died when Beatrice was 18 months old. Beatrice attended the Barnard School for Girls (founded in 1889) from 1912 to 1915, before graduating from Mount Holyoke College in 1919 as a Phi Beta Kappa with a double major in history and art. Hyslop taught at a private school for two years before starting graduate school at Columbia University. She received her A.M. in 1924 and taught at Rosemary Hall and Mount Holyoke for the next four years.

Hyslop started work on her Ph.D. at Columbia in 1928 and she was commissioned by the French Government to catalog a list of grievances drawn up during the election of the Estates General of 1789 (cahiers de doléances), spending three years in France on the project. In recognition of her work, she was made a Chevalier of the Ordre des Palmes Académiques. Her doctoral thesis published in 1933 as Répertoire critique des cahiers de doléances pour les Etats-généreaux de 1789. Hyslop was awarded her Ph.D. the next year and she published French Nationalism in 1789 According to the General Cahiers. She also returned to the United States that year and taught at a private school for a year before she was hired as a history instructor at Hunter College in 1936. That same year she published A Guide to the General Cahiers.

Hyslop became an assistant professor in 1941, an associate professor eight years later and a full professor in 1954. In the meantime, she had been upgraded to Officier rank in the Ordre des Palmes Académiques in 1952. Hyslop founded the Society for French Historical Studies in 1955 and later served as its president. In 1961 she became a Chevalier de la Légion d’Honneur. She published L’Apanage de Philippe-Egalité, duc d’Orléans, 1785–1791. She retired in 1969 from Hunter College and was a co-author of The Napoleonic Era in Europe the following year. Hyslop died on 23 July 1973 of a heart attack in Rochester, New York.
