= Patience Worth =

American poet

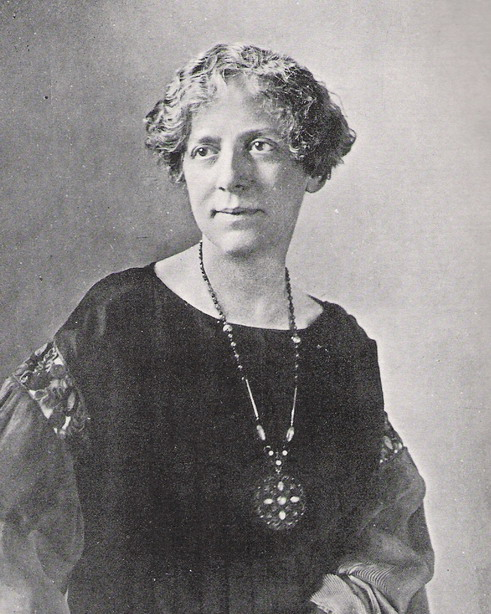
Pearl Curran, about 1926

Patience Worth was allegedly a disembodied spirit contacted by Pearl Lenore Curran (February 15, 1883 – December 2, 1937). This purported relationship produced several novels, poetry and prose which Pearl Curran claimed were delivered to her through channelling the spirit of Patience Worth.

Psychologists and skeptics who have studied Curran's writings are in agreement that Patience was a fictitious creation of Curran.

== About Pearl Curran ==
Curran was born Pearl Lenore Pollard in Mound City, Illinois. The family moved to Texas when she was eight months old and she started school when she was six. She was an average but uninterested student, eventually dropping out in her first high school year, later stating she had a nervous breakdown due to the strenuous academics. She later returned to classes at St. Ignatius Catholic school.

Curran was sensitive about her looks, considering herself to be ugly. She admitted to having little imagination and few ambitions, except to be successful as a singer. She had a short attention span and read very little during her formative years.

Her family moved to St. Louis when she was 14. She made a last attempt at attending school but was discouraged when placed in a lower grade based on her academic skills. However, she took music lessons, trained in piano and voice, and aspired to be a prima donna. About that time the family moved again, to Palmer, Missouri. As Curran's musical talents blossomed, she was sent to Kankakee, Illinois for voice training, before moving to Chicago for tuition from J.C. Cooper. She worked at the McKinley Music Company addressing envelopes for $6 a week, then the Thompson Music Company selling music. From the age of 18 to 24 she worked at assorted jobs in Chicago during winter months, and during the summer she taught music at home in Missouri.

Pearl married John Howard Curran when she was 24. Though by no means wealthy, they lived a lifestyle which gave Pearl free time for moviegoing or playing cards with her husband or neighbors. The Currans had an average education for that time and owned few books; neither of them had traveled extensively. The first seven years of their marriage were uneventful.

== The appearance of Patience Worth ==
Beginning in July 1912, Pearl Curran and her friend Emily Grant Hutchings were making a call on a neighbor who had a ouija board and during that call there came what purported to be a message from a relative of Mrs. Hutchings. Mrs. Hutchings then bought a ouija board and took it to Mrs. Curran's house with the idea of continuing the communications. Pearl was somewhat indifferent and had to be coaxed to participate at the board. On June 22, 1913 a communication from "Pat-C" began to come through. Then on July 8, 1913 the board seemed to be possessed with unusual strength and supposed communications from Patience Worth began. "Many moons ago I lived. Again I come. Patience Worth my name. Wait, I would speak with thee. If thou shalt live, then so shall I. I make my bread at thy hearth. Good friends, let us be merrie. The time for work is past. Let the tabby drowse and blink her wisdom to the firelog." When asked when she lived, the dates 1649–94 were given and that her home was "Across the sea".

Although Worth indicated that she was from England, she never named the town or village in which she lived. She did give some clues which were deduced by Casper Yost and other intimates of the Currans to indicate that Patience Worth had lived in rural Dorsetshire with her father John and mother Anne. Curran had a mental picture of the place in which Patience Worth lived indicating that Patience lived in "...green rolling country with gentle slopes, not farmed much, with houses here and there. Two or three miles up this country on this road was a small village ---few houses." Curran then visualized Patience leaving for America on a huge wood, three-masted schooner. Patience was described by Curran as "...probably about thirty years. Her hair was dark red, mahogany, her eyes brown, and large and deep, her mouth firm and set, as though repressing strong feelings. Her hair had been disarranged by her cap, and was in big, glossy, soft waves." Curran also saw Patience "sitting on a horse, holding a bundle tied in sail-cloth, tied with thongs and wearing a coarse cloth cape, brown-gray, with hood like a cowl, peaked. The face is in shadow. She is small and her feet are small---with coarse square-toed shoes and gray woolen stockings." After a long voyage the ship arrives at the jagged coast of America, where they could find no landing place for the ship. They launched several flat boats. According to Curran, Patience was standing in the prow of her boat and became one of the first to reach the shore. Patience Worth was later to indicate that she was eventually killed by the Indians.

In 1916, in a book with a foreword written by Casper Yost, editor of the St. Louis Globe-Democrat, Henry Holt and Company publicized Curran's claims that she had contacted the long dead Patience Worth. Curran claimed she began to anticipate what the Ouija board was going to spell and by 1919 the pointer would just move aimlessly about the board. Curran described pictorial visions which accompanied Patience's words. She said "I am like a child with a magic picture book. Once I look upon it, all I have to do is to watch its pages open before me, and revel in their beauty and variety and novelty....When the poems come, there also appear before my eyes images of each successive symbol, as the words are given me....When the stories come, the scenes become panoramic, with the characters moving and acting their parts, even speaking in converse. The picture is not confined to the point narrated, but takes in everything else within the circle of vision at the time....If the people talk a foreign language, as in The Sorry Tale, I hear the talk, but over and above is the voice of Patience, either interpreting or giving me the part she wishes to use as story." Pearl Curran went on to describe her association with Patience Worth as "one of the most beautiful that can be the privilege of a human being to experience." Pearl and Patience together wrote several novels including Telka, The Sorry Tale, Hope Trueblood, The Pot upon the Wheel, Samuel Wheaton, An Elisebethan Mask [sic] as well as several short stories and many poems.

The Patience Worth writings coincided with a revival of Spiritualism in the United States and Britain, possibly facilitating interest in the matter. Skeptics derided certain aspects of the supposed communication, noting particularly that Patience was able to write a novel about the Victorian age, an era some 200 years after the one in which she claimed to have lived. Still, the literature produced was considered to be of a high quality by some. For instance, the literary critic William Marion Reedy considered The Sorry Tale to be a new classic of world literature. Patience Worth was also listed as one of the outstanding authors of 1918 by The Joint Committee of Literary Arts of New York. She was also cited by William Stanley Braithwaite in the 1918 edition of the Anthology of Magazine Verse and Year Book of American Poetry by printing the complete text of five of her poems, along with other leading poets of the day including William Rose Benét, Amy Lowell, and Edgar Lee Masters. Braithwaite's index of magazine verse for 1918 listed the titles of eighty-eight poems by Patience Worth that appeared in magazines during the twelve-month period, only two of which were considered by Braithwaite to be lacking in any distinction. The same index listed ten poems by Amy Lowell and five by Edna St. Vincent Millay.

John Curran, who kept meticulous records of the Patience Worth sessions, died on June 1, 1922. After his death, the record of the Patience Worth sessions became episodic and fragmentary, with long gaps of time unaccounted for. Pearl was pregnant with her first child which was born six months after her husband's death. Pearl now had a family of four to support by herself and her financial situation so bleak that Herman Behr, a devoted friend, sent money to Curran and announced that he would continue to do so as long as she needed it. Behr provided Curran with an income of $400 a month for a number of years. Curran then entered the lecture circuit to make some money to support her family. A few months later, her mother Mary Pollard died. The sessions with Patience Worth still continued regularly at Curran's home. Curran's financial situation continued to be bleak. She married two more times, but both marriages were short-lived. In the summer of 1930, Curran left St. Louis for good and moved to California to live with an old friend Alexander Bailey "Dotsie" Smith in the Los Angeles area. Patience was kept busy at the sessions, as always, by requests for her comments on major topics of the day and other issues. She continued to communicate through Pearl until November 25, 1937, when she gave her final communication. Pearl had apparently received a prior communication from Patience that she (Pearl) was going to die as Pearl told Dotsie Smith "Oh Dotsie, Patience has just shown me the end of the road and you will have to carry on as best you can." Even though Pearl had not been in ill health, she developed pneumonia late in November and died on December 3, 1937.

== Evaluation ==
=== Paranormal belief ===
In 1916, Casper Yost published Patience Worth: A Psychic Mystery. In the book, he did not come to any definite conclusion but considered the case of Patience Worth to be inexplicable by any naturalistic theory. He was open to the spiritualist hypothesis. A thorough investigation of the case was conducted by the psychic researcher Walter Franklin Prince, who published in 1927 his book The Case of Patience Worth, which was a voluminous report of 509 pages covering the Patience Worth case from its inception in 1913 to about 1927, published by the Boston Society for Psychical Research. It provided a biographical sketch of Pearl Curran, eye-witness reports, opinions and reviews, poetry of Patience and Mrs. Curran, and much other information related to the case. Prince concluded his investigation by stating, "Either our concept of what we call the subconscious must be radically altered, so as to include potencies of which we hitherto have had no knowledge, or else some cause operating through but not originating in the subconsciousness of Mrs. Curran must be acknowledged."

The parapsychologist Stephen E. Braude has examined the case of Patience Worth and concluded that Pearl Curran was probably a highly gifted child whose talent for writing was smothered by her mother, who wanted to force Pearl into a singing career. In the alter ego of Patience Worth, her subconscious could revive that talent. Braude has written "there is little reason to think that the evidence supports the hypothesis of survival. Although Patience offered various clues regarding her origin and identity, subsequent investigation revealed nothing to indicate that a Patience Worth ever existed." Braude also considered the possibility of "super-psi": the view that Curran had subconsciously utilized a form of extrasensory perception to gather information.

=== Scientific skepticism ===
In 1914 Curran travelled to Boston to be tested by the psychologist Morton Prince. Curran used the Ouija board at his home on two occasions but refused to be put under hypnosis because she believed that it would destroy her contact with Patience Worth. Morton told reporters "nothing of scientific importance" occurred and "I consider the results inconsequential and of no scientific value".

In 1919, Charles E. Cory Professor of Philosophy at Washington University in St. Louis published a paper titled Patience Worth in the Psychological Review which came to the conclusion Patience Worth was a subconscious personality of Curran. In 1954, William Sentman Taylor, a specialist in abnormal psychology, also explained Curran's mediumship by psychological factors.

The psychologists Leonard Zusne, Warren H. Jones in their book Anomalistic Psychology: A Study of Magical Thinking (1989) have written:

The various accounts of Mrs. Curran's background purporting to show that, as Mrs. Curran, she could not have produced the literary works of Patience Worth are inaccurate. As a child, Mrs. Curran was a precocious learner. Her education was good enough to enable her to teach at various public and private schools. She had received extensive tutoring as well as expensive voice and piano training. She played the piano at a church, which happened to be a spiritualist church headed by her uncle, a medium. As to the purported 17th-century English that Mrs. Curran used as Patience Worth, English experts testified that it did not belong to any particular historical period but was a mixture of contemporary English, poetic terms, some dialect expressions, including some misused and misunderstood would-be Scottish words, and even some of her own invention. The trigger for the appearance of Patience Worth could have been the death of Mrs. Curran's father just 2 months earlier.

In 2011, the psychologist Richard Wiseman wrote:

Unfortunately for Spiritualism, Curran’s writings failed to provide convincing evidence of life after death. Try as they might, researchers were unable to find any evidence that Patience Worth actually existed, and linguistic analysis of the texts revealed that the language was not consistent with other works from the period. The case for authenticity was not helped by Patience writing a novel set in the Victorian times, some 200 years after her own death. Eventually even the most ardent believer was forced to conclude that Pearl Curran’s remarkable outpourings were more likely to have a natural, not supernatural, explanation.

In 2012, the researcher Joe Nickell, who published an article on the subject in the Skeptical Inquirer, said he spent five hours studying Curran's writings at the Missouri Historical Society in St. Louis. Nickell concluded:

The weight of the evidence—the lack of historical record for “Patience Worth,” the fantasy proneness of Curran (consistent with producing an imaginary “other self”), the writings’ questionable language, and the evidence of the editing and revision process—indicates that Patience was merely a persona of Curran’s.

=== Allegations of fraud ===
In 1916 the psychical researcher James Hyslop wrote that the whole case for Curran's mediumship was based on fraud. Hyslop in the Journal for the American Society for Psychical Research claimed Curran had known people from the Ozarks who spoke a dialect reminiscent of Patience Worth and Curran's husband had studied Chaucer and educated her on the subject. According to Hyslop the case of Patience Worth was "a fraud and delusion for any person who wishes to treat it seriously." Hyslop also accused Casper Yost and the publisher of his book Henry Holt of knowing about the fraud but covering it up to increase sales of the book. In the Mirror articles appeared by Emily Hutchings and Yost defending Curran against allegations of fraud. In response, Hyslop wrote a letter to the Mirror which claimed he had been told of Curran's knowledge of Chaucer by a "scientific man" who had heard it from Mr Curran himself. In 1938 the ASPR journal published an anonymous article which refuted all of Hyslop's accusations. According to the article the Ozark dialect did not resemble the language of Patience Worth and knowledge of Chaucer would not have given Curran the vocabulary to compose the Patience Worth literature.

Daniel Shea, a professor emeritus of English at Washington University, studied the case and wrote there might have been fraud involved by Curran's reading books and other material in the hours before the Patience Worth sessions. If true, Pearl may have felt guilt, which might have been expiated by her writing "Rosa Alvaro, Entrante."

== See also ==
- Christine Beauchamp
- Rosemary Brown
- Jane Roberts
