= Winifred Coombe Tennant =

British politician (1874–1956)

Winifred Coombe Tennant

Mrs Winifred Margaret Coombe Tennant (1 November 1874 – 31 August 1956) was a British suffragist, Liberal politician, philanthropist, patron of the arts and spiritualist. She and her husband lived near Swansea in South Wales, where she became an enthusiastic proponent of Welsh cultural traditions. She was also known by the bardic name "Mam o Nedd".

== Biography ==
Born Winifred Margaret Pearce-Serocold in Britain on 1 November 1874, at Rodborough Lodge, Rodborough, Gloucestershire, she was the only child of Royal Navy Lieutenant George Edward Pearce-Serocold (1828–1912), of a landed gentry family of Cherry Hinton, Cambridgeshire, and his second wife, Mary Clarke, daughter of Jeremiah Clarke Richardson, J.P., of Derwen Fawr, near Swansea. She was raised in France and Italy, where she was privately educated.

On 12 December 1895 she married Charles Coombe Tennant (1852–1928), who was 22 years older than she; they lived at his family's house, Cadoxton Lodge, Neath. He was son of the St Albans M.P. Charles Tennant. They had three sons, Christopher, Alexander, and Henry, and a daughter Daphne, but Christopher and Daphne died young.

Her child Henry was the result of a deliberate affair with Gerald Balfour.

== Suffragism and politics ==
Before the First World War, Winifred Coombe Tennant became a suffragist; She was a leading figure in the campaign for women's suffrage in south Wales and became president of Neath Women's Suffrage Society. In 1914 when war broke out she was appointed deputy chairman of the Women's Agricultural Committee for Glamorgan (in which capacity she served until 1918) as well as chairman of the local War Pensions Commission in 1917. She also served as director of national service for Wales. She was at pains to stress that women claimed the vote as of right and not as a reward for their war work, although she acknowledged the role the war had played in changing attitudes to women's enfranchisement. She was a leading campaigner for Lloyd George's Coalition Liberals at the general election of 1918.

In 1920, she became the first woman to serve as a magistrate in Glamorgan. She was a member of the executive of the Welsh National Liberal Council and of the Committee for Self Government for Wales. In 1922 she was nominated by David Lloyd George to be a representative at the League of Nations, becoming the first British woman to do so. She was selected as the National Liberal candidate for the Forest of Dean constituency, but lost to the Labour candidate.

1922 General Election: Forest of Dean Electorate 28,686
Party	Candidate	Votes	%	±%
Labour	James Wignall	10,820	52.4	−10.4
Unionist	Augustus Charles C. Dinnick	5,966	28.9	n/a
National Liberal	Winifred Margaret Coombe Tennant	3,861	18.7	
Majority		4,844	23.5	
Turnout		+15.9	72.0	
Labour hold		Swing		

As a nationalist, she was heavily involved in the Eisteddfod movement, becoming Mistress of the Robes to Gorsedd Cymru and receiving an honorary Bardic degree in 1918.

She collected works of art (including the Coombe Tennant collection of Modern French pictures); and in 1931 she became official buyer for the Glynn Vivian Art Gallery in Swansea, acquiring works by artists such as Gwen John, Kyffin Williams John Elwyn and Evan Walters. She was also a member of the Executive Committee of the Swansea Art Gallery.

== Spiritualism ==
Under the name "Mrs Willett", Winifred Coombe Tennant practised as a medium, her clients including Sir Oliver Lodge. She was one of the mediums involved in cross-correspondences, in which messages from the deceased Mary Catherine Lyttleton (who died on 21 March 1875) were supposedly transmitted by automatic writing to her lover Arthur Balfour. She had a long association with the writer and spiritualist Geraldine Cummins. She died on 31 August 1956 at her home in Kensington, London. Her papers are held in the archive of the National Library of Wales.

After her death, Cummins published the book Swan on a Black Sea, containing their correspondence, along with messages received from the alleged spirit of "Mrs Willett" describing the afterlife. According to the psychical researcher Eric Dingwall, information published in Cummins' scripts allegedly from Willett were discovered to be erroneous.

The anthropologist and skeptic Edward Clodd wrote that the explanation for the cross-correspondences was the subconscious mind of the medium, not spirits. According to him, many of the messages were "inconsequential rubbish". Margaret Verrall was a well-educated classicist who had studied Latin and Greek with her husband. Clodd suggested that Willett had communicated with Verrall and looked up references in classical lore.
