= Oxford Phasmatological Society =

Coordinates: 51.754°N 1.257°W

The Oxford Phasmatological Society was an organisation from Oxford that investigated paranormal phenomena. It lasted from 1879-1885. It is considered to have been the first psychical research society.

It was founded by Edward Ridley and F. C. S. Schiller, with Charles Oman, who served as one of its four presidents. Arthur Headlam also served as president. Similarly to the Society for Psychical Research formed in 1882, it collected and investigated reports of ghosts, hauntings, and psychic phenomena.

Meetings were held in the rooms of Schiller at Balliol College.

== Publications ==
- Selections from the Papers of the Phasmatological Society (1882)
