= Amy Tanner =

American psychologist 1870-1956

Amy Eliza Tanner
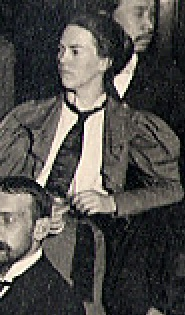
- Born: March 21, 1870; Owatonna, Minnesota, U.S.
- Died: February 1, 1956 (aged 85)
- Burial place: Hope Cemetery; Worcester, Massachusetts, U.S.
- Education: University of Chicago
- Occupation: Psychologist

Amy Eliza Tanner (March 21, 1870 – February 1, 1956) was an American psychologist who became well known for discrediting the then-famous medium Leonora Piper after Tanner was allowed to attend six séances with a fellow researcher.

== Biography ==
Tanner was born in Owatonna, Minnesota. She earned a doctoral degree in philosophy from the University of Chicago in 1898, finishing magna cum laude. Following her graduation from the University of Chicago, and unable to find employment elsewhere, she worked as an associate at the university's philosophy department. Four years later, she became a professor of philosophy at Wilson College in Chambersburg, Pennsylvania.

Although she had earned her Ph.D. in philosophy, her interests and her work led her to psychology and social psychology. Her unpublished dissertation was titled Association of Ideas: A Preliminary Study, and she published her subsequent research in psychology journals.

In 1907, Tanner became an "Honorary University Fellow" at Clark University, a position she held until 1916. While at Clark University, she investigated mediumship with the psychologist G. Stanley Hall. She published her findings as sole author in the book Studies in Spiritism (1910) which documented the tests she and Hall had carried out in the séance sittings held with the medium Leonora Piper. Hall and Tanner had proven by tests that the "personalities" of Piper were fictitious creations and not discarnate spirits.

She left Clark (and academic work) in 1919, and remained in Worcester, Massachusetts. She was the director of the Worcester Girls Club for many years and represented the local Woman's Club on the Worcester Censorship Board. She purchased the Majestic Theater in Worcester in 1919 and operated it for a few years. She died on February 1, 1956. She was buried in Hope Cemetery.

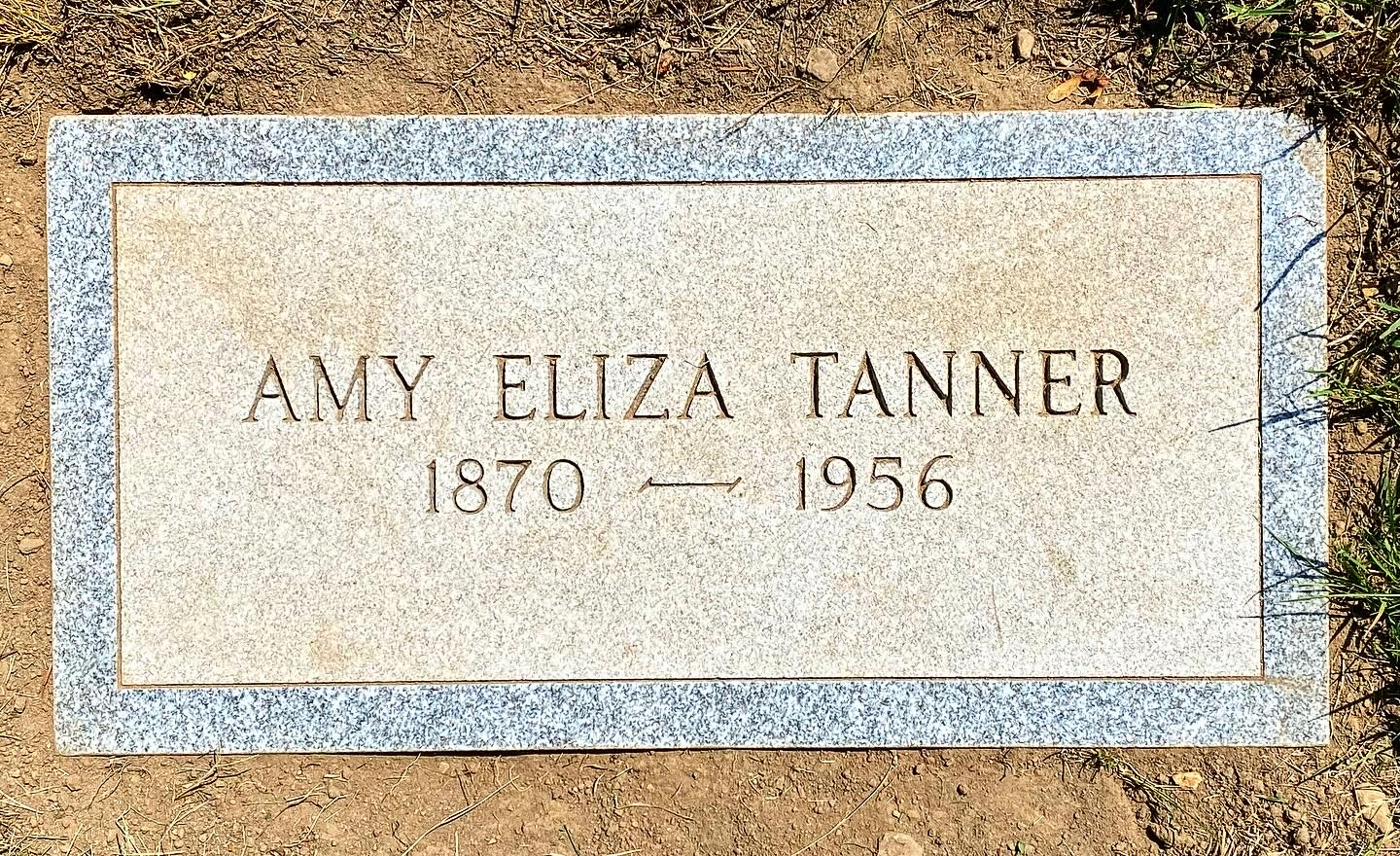

== Selected publications ==
- Studies in Spiritism. New York/London: D. Appleton & Company. 1910. OCLC 504458472.
- "The Philosophy of Loyalty by Josiah Royce". The American Journal of Psychology. 19 (3): 409–412. July 1908. doi:10.2307/1413202. JSTOR 1413202.
- "Etudes d'Histoire et de Psychologie du Mysticisme, Les grands mystiques chrétiens by Henri Delacroix". The American Journal of Psychology. 19 (3): 412–413. July 1908. doi:10.2307/1413203. hdl:2027/mdp.39015065943329. JSTOR 1413203.
- "The Inward Light by H. Fielding Hall". The American Journal of Psychology. 19 (3): 413–414. July 1908. doi:10.2307/1413204. JSTOR 1413204.
- Tanner, Amy E. (1907). "An Illustration of the Psychology of Belief". Psychological Bulletin. 4 (2): 33–36. doi:10.1037/h0073712.
- Tanner, Amy E. (July 1907). "Glimpses at the Mind of a Waitress". American Journal of Sociology. 13 (1): 48–55. doi:10.1086/211561. S2CID 144324152.
- The Child: His Thinking, Feeling, and Doing. Chicago: Rand McNally. 1904. OCLC 1031797494 – via Google Books.
- "Association of Ideas: A Preliminary Study." Unpublished doctoral dissertation, University of Chicago, Chicago. (1900)
