= Casper Yost =

American journalist (1864–1941)

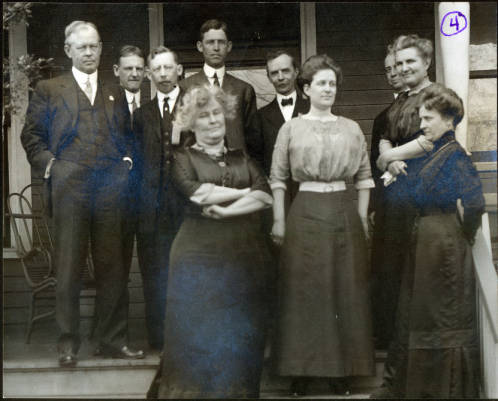
Six men and four women stand together on the steps for a photo. Women in picture, left to right: Winifred Black, unidentified woman, Hulda H. Williams (Mrs. Walter Williams), unidentified woman. Men, from left to right: unknown, unknown, unknown, Ovid Bell, Caspar Yost, Walter Williams (mostly obscured by Mrs. Williams). The State Historical Society of Missouri.

Casper Salathiel Yost (1864–1941) was the longtime editor of the St. Louis Globe-Democrat, a poet and an honored journalist.

== Early life ==
Yost was born in Sedalia, Missouri on July 1, 1854. His parents were George Casper Yost and Sarah Elizabeth Roberts Yost.

== Career ==
Yost apprenticed as a printer and a writer. He moved to St. Louis in 1881 and worked as a reporter on the St. Louis Chronicle. He worked as a telegraph operator on the railroads until 1885 in Richland, Missouri. Later that year, Yost moved back to St. Louis and returned to his journalism career. He began working as a reporter on the Missouri Republican, where he stayed for three years.

Yost began working at the St. Louis Globe-Democrat in 1889 and remained with the paper for 50 years. He was the founder of the American Society of Newspaper Editors and was influential in developing its code of ethics. Yost helped create the organization to enhance "the integrity of the profession" in response to criticism that journalism was only for entertainment and profits. After Frederick Allen's critique of the integrity of jazz-age journalists in the January 1922 issue of Atlantic Monthly, Yost called a meeting of like minded editors which lead to the creation of ASNE. He sent letters to editors throughout the country suggesting the creation of a national society, and in March 1922, editors from many major newspapers met in Chicago. These some of these included the editors of the Chicago Tribune, the Chicago Daily News, the Detroit News, and the Cleveland Plain Dealer, among many others. Yost was chosen as chairman and E.C. Hopwood of the Cleveland Plain Dealer was elected secretary. On April 25, 1922, the group met again at the Waldorf-Astoria, with additional newspaper editors and were set to craft a tentative constitution and solidify their organization. In a letter to his wife, Anna, Yost wrote that creating ASNE was "the greatest thing ever done for journalism."

Yost was also a prominent member of the St. Louis Civitan Club, serving as president of the board of governors for many years before his death.

== Accolades ==
As well as writing for newspapers, Yost was also a poet. One of his poems, "Our Destiny", became well known after President McKinley quoted it in one of his speeches. The liberty ship SS Casper S. Yost, launched in 1944, was named for him. Yost also received academic honorary degrees from Lincoln Memorial University in 1926, McKendree College in 1926, and the University of Missouri in 1934. In 1940, he received a Doctor of Literature degree from Culver-Stockton. In 1936, Yost was given the national award for Scholarship in Journalism from Sigma Delta Chi, a national journalism fraternity.

== Writings of Patience Worth ==
In 1916 Yost published what he called “…facts in relation to some phenomena …” related to the “occult manifestations” of Patience Worth, a spirit entity channeled by Pearl Curran from 1913 through 1937. This book, titled Patience Worth: A Psychic Mystery brought the novels, plays, and poems of Patience Worth to the attention of the general public.

Worth also dictated colors and cover designs to her publisher. When asked if Pearl Curran's photo should be included in the book, Worth replied "She be but the pot." Yost was invited to attend Curran's sessions with Patience Worth and soon became an editor of Worth's messages and an advocate for channeling the spirit. At times, Worth generated 2,000 words per hour.

Yost spurred curiosity amongst Globe readers by publishing stories such as "The Fool and the Lady" and "The Stranger," both published in February 1915. Yost, along with Pearl Curran and her husband, John Curran, published Patience Worth's Magazine from August 1917 to May 1918. The magazine published selections allegedly composed by Patience Worth, including poetry, short fiction, and commentary on public issues, celebrities, and worldly mysteries. Yost also edited the book The Sorry Tale: A Story of the Time of Christ attributed to Patience Worth and communicated through Pearl Curran, published in 1917. Other books by Yost include The Carpenter of Nazareth, In Quest of God, and Patience Worth, Revisited.

== Personal life ==
Casper Yost was married to Anna Augusta Parrott Yost. The two had eight children: Casper, John, Henry, Philip, Anna Elizabeth, Margaret, Anna, and Susannah.

== Death ==
Casper Yost died in St. Louis. He was seventy-seven years old.
