= Henry Slade (medium) =

American fraudulent medium (1835–1905)

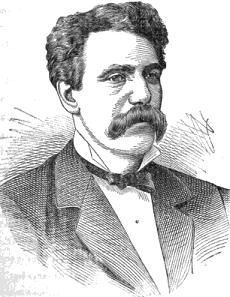
Henry Slade

Henry Slade (1835–1905) was a famous fraudulent medium who lived and practiced in both Europe and North America. Slade was best known for his "slate writing" method, where he would purportedly produce messages written by spirits on slates.

== Biography ==
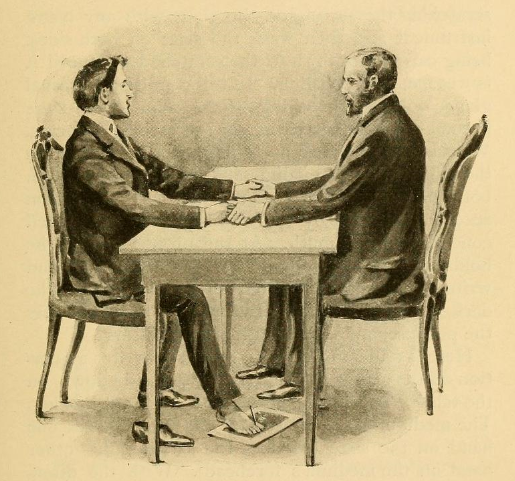
One of Slade's fraudulent slate writing methods

Slade was most well known as a slate-writing medium. During his séances he would place a small slate with a piece of chalk under a table and would claim spirits would use it to write messages. According to Joe Nickell, Slade was repeatedly caught faking the spirit messages in his séances and he produced his phenomena by a variety of magic tricks.

Science writer Karen Stollznow has noted that:

Slate writing was a simple parlor trick, often involving a double-sided chalkboard or a hidden slate upon which the "message" was already written. Many mediums were caught faking the practice, including Henry Slade, the man who discovered the phenomenon. Slade was writing these messages from the "dead" using tiny pieces of chalk held in the fingers of either hand, the toes of either foot, or his mouth.

In 1872, Slade was caught in fraud in New York by John W. Truesdell, who had two sittings with him. During the séance Truesdell observed Slade using his foot to move objects under the table, and writing on a slate. In a séance Stanley LeFevre Krebs employed a secret mirror and caught Slade swapping slates and hiding them in the back of his chair.

In a séance in 1876 in London Ray Lankester and Bryan Donkin caught Slade in fraud. Lankester snatched the slate before the "spirit" message was supposed to be written, and found the writing already there. He was prosecuted for fraud on October 1, 1876, in London and was sentenced to three months in prison. However, Slade made an appeal, which was sustained, on the ground that the words "by palmistry or otherwise" had been omitted in the indictment. Before he could be arrested on the new summons, he fled to America.

Slade also performed a trick where he would play an accordion with one hand under the table. The magician Chung Ling Soo exposed how Slade had performed the trick.

Johann Karl Friedrich Zöllner, Professor of Physics and Astronomy at the University of Leipzig conducted several controlled experiments, using Slade, to evaluate his claims of paranormal ability in 1877. Slade failed some of the tests carried out under controlled conditions but still succeeded in fooling Zöllner in several other attempts. Zöllner was convinced in Slade's supernatural abilities and wrote his book Transcendental Physics based on his observations of Slade. Hereward Carrington in his book The Physical Phenomena of Spiritualism (1907) revealed the fraudulent methods (with diagrams of the rope tricks) that Slade used in the Zöllner experiments. Other notable people who Slade successfully fooled include William Fletcher Barrett and Alfred Russel Wallace. Wallace believed in Slade's abilities despite knowing that they had been debunked by the magician John Nevil Maskelyne in court.

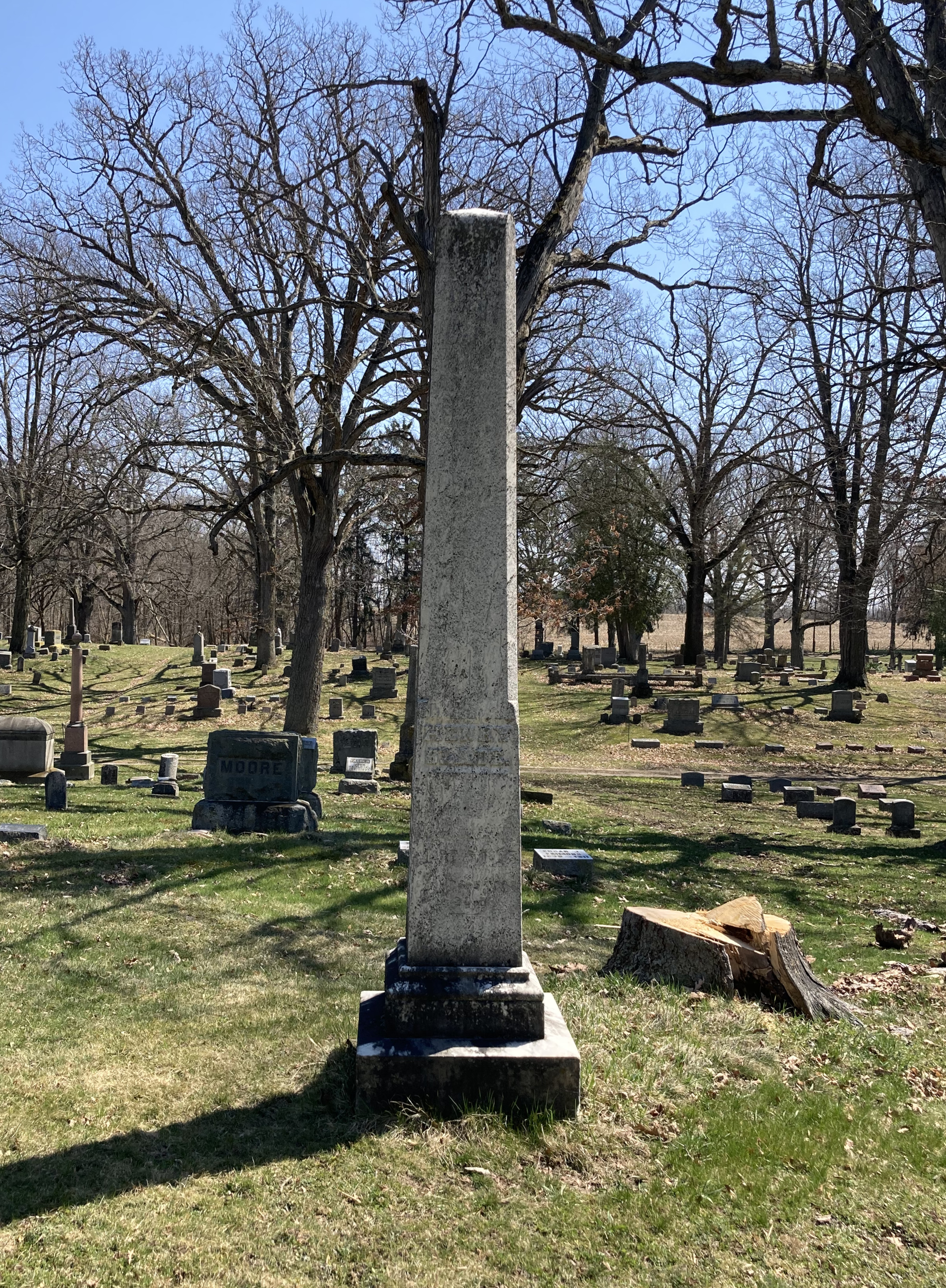
Slade's grave at Riverside Cemetery

In 1882 in Belleville séance sitters caught Slade making "spirit" raps against the rung of his chair, using his foot to move a slate, writing "spirit" messages and substituting slates. He was also exposed as a fraud in 1885 by the Seybert Commission as it was discovered that the slates had prepared messages on them. In 1886-1887, Richard Hodgson and S. J. Davey also exposed slate writing as fraudulent, which contributed to its decline as a spiritualist method.

The magician David Abbott in his book Behind the Scenes with the Mediums (1908) revealed that Slade would also use his toes for writing messages on slates.

Slade died on September 8, 1905, at a sanatorium in Belding, Michigan. He was buried at Riverside Cemetery in Albion.

== Confession ==
The magician Harry Houdini met the ex-medium Remigius Weiss in Philadelphia who had testified to the Seybert Commission that Slade's methods were fraudulent. According to Houdini he had given him the "best expose ever written of Slade's slate writings." Weiss also obtained a signed confession from Slade that all his spiritualist manifestations were deceptions performed through tricks and this confession was reproduced by Houdini in his book A Magician Among the Spirits (first published 1924).
