= Alan Gauld =

British psychologist and writer

- Born: 1932; Portland, Dorset, England
- Died: 2024 (aged 91–92)
- Occupation: Writer

Alan Gauld (born 1932) is a British parapsychologist, psychologist and spiritualist writer best known for his research on the history of hypnotism and mediumship.

== Biography ==
Gauld was born in Portland, Dorset. In the late 1950s, he attended Harvard University. He obtained an M.S. in 1958 and a PhD in 1962 from Emmanuel College, Cambridge. He taught psychology at the University of Nottingham and was the president of the Society for Psychical Research from 1989 to 1992.

Gauld has generally been skeptical of physical mediumship. He has claimed that ectoplasm materializations seem to "smack very strongly of fraud and conjuring", such as made from cheesecloth or net curtain. He states however that he believes there is genuine evidence for movement of objects during séances including the phenomena produced with the medium Daniel Dunglas Home. This is in opposition to other researchers who have declared that Home was fraudulent.

He has criticized the Scole experiment, a series of séances that members of the Society for Psychical Research investigated. During one of the séances there was "spontaneous appearance of images on film", though Gauld discovered that the locked box was "easily opened in the dark, which allowed for easy substitution of film rolls."

In 2022, Gauld authored The Heyday of Mental Mediumship, published by the spiritualist company White Crow Books which revealed he has spiritualist beliefs.

== Reception ==
Gauld's The Founders of Psychical Research (1968) documents early investigations into paranormal phenomena. The book received a mixed review by Robert Kent Donovan who praised the research but complained that Gauld was biased in support of the authenticity of the findings from the psychical researchers.

Psychologist C. E. M. Hansel has criticized The Founders of Psychical Research for ignoring certain historical sources. Hansel noted that when discussing spiritualist mediums such as the Fox sisters or Eusapia Palladino, Gauld failed to "report important observations that suggest physical rather than psychical explanations."

He has drawn criticism from historian Ruth Brandon for disputing the confession of the Fox sisters.

Gauld's book A History Of Hypnotism (1992) documents the history of hypnosis. It was positively reviewed by medical historian Roger Cooter in the British Medical Journal who recommended it as a "useful reference tool." The book was also positively reviewed by philosopher Peter G. Sobol who wrote that "with its broad coverage and attention to detail, this is an indispensable book for any future work on the history of hypnosis." Psychologist Geoffrey Blowers also praised the book commenting that "he steers a clear path through the large, diverse literature and avoids a partisan stance on the findings to present a lively and informative account of this baffling phenomenon." Psychiatrist Melvin A. Gravitz described the book as a "significant contribution to the field, which will stand as a hallmark of scholarship for many years."

== Selected publications ==
- The Founders of Psychical Research (1968)
- Human Action and its Psychological Investigation [with John Shotter] (1977)
- Poltergeists (1979) [with Tony Cornell]
- Andrew Lang as Psychical Researcher (1983)
- Mediumship and Survival: A Century of Investigations (1983)
- A History Of Hypnotism (1992)
- The Heyday of Mental Mediumship: 1880s – 1930s: Investigators, Mediums and Communicators (2022)
