= Charles Mercier =

British psychiatrist

Charles Mercier FRCP FRCS
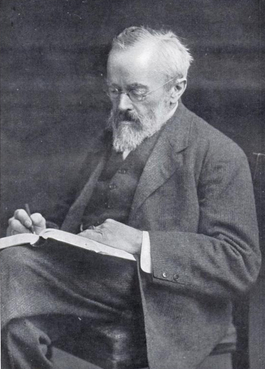
- Born: 21 June 1851
- Died: 2 September 1919 (aged 68); Bournemouth
- Occupations: Psychiatrist, spiritualist debunker

Charles Arthur Mercier (21 June 1851 – 2 September 1919) was a British psychiatrist and leading expert on forensic psychiatry and insanity.

== Biography ==
Mercier was born on 21 June 1851. He studied medicine at the University of London where he graduated. He worked at Buckinghamshire County Asylum in Stone, near Aylesbury. He became the Assistant Medical Officer at Leavesden Hospital and at the City of London Asylum in Dartford, Kent. He also worked as a surgeon at the Jenny Lind Hospital. He was the resident physician at Flower House, a private asylum in Catford. In 1902 became a lecturer in insanity at the Westminster Hospital Medical School. He was also a physician for mental diseases at Charing Cross Hospital.

In 1894 Mercier was secretary of a committee of the Medico-Psychological Association. He published articles in the Journal of Mental Science. He joined the Medico-Legal Society in 1905, and became the president of the Medico-Psychological Association in 1908. Mercier has been described as a pioneer in the field of forensic psychiatry.

In 1917 Mercier wrote to the Mind Association denouncing politician-philosopher Lord Haldane and philosopher Bertrand Russell as traitors.

He was the author of many important works on crime, insanity, and psychology.

In 1916, Mercier criticized vegetarianism in The Lancet journal. Mercier suggested that vegetarians had an unbalanced mind and "we should expect, therefore, to find among vegetarians an undue proportion of insane persons."

== Spiritualism ==
Mercier, who spent most of his career studying insanity and mental disorders, did not believe human personality could survive death.

Mercier attacked spiritualism in the Hibbert Journal for 1917. His book Spiritualism and Sir Oliver Lodge (1917) was an exposure of trance mediumship and a criticism of the spiritualist views of Oliver Lodge. In the book he criticized Lodge for ignoring Occam's razor and invoking miracles.

In his book Spirit Experiences (1919), Mercier claimed to have converted to spiritualism and apologized for his previous book. He claimed that after investigating the subject he had personally experienced communications with the dead, levitation and telepathy. The book was heavily criticized in a review. However, the book was actually a satire that intended on mocking the credulity shown by believers in spiritualism. It was published by Watts & Co, a publishing company that has historical links with the Rationalist Association. The book was positively reviewed by the British Journal of Psychiatry, which described it as a well-written parody of spiritualist phenomena.

David Robert Grimes has noted that "Mercier had spent a great deal of time debunking trance mediums, painstakingly dismantling their claims".

== Publications ==
Books

- The Nervous System and the Mind (1888)
- Sanity and Insanity (1890)
- Lunatic Asylums, Their Organisation and Management (1894)
- Psychology, Normal and Morbid (1901)
- A Text-Book of Insanity (1902)
- Criminal Responsibility (1905)
- Crime and Insanity (1911)
- Conduct and Its Disorders (1911)
- A New Logic (1912)
- Leper Houses and Mediaeval Hospitals (1915)
- Human Temperaments: Studies in Character (1916)
- On Causation (1916)
- Food, Sleep, and Efficiency (1917)
- Spiritualism and Sir Oliver Lodge (1917)
- Crime and Criminals (1918)
- Spirit Experiences (1919)

Selected papers

- Mercier, Charles. (1913). Vitalism and Materialism. Bedrock: A Quarterly Review of Scientific Thought 3 (2): 352–357.
- Mercier, Charles. (1915). Vitalism. The Hibbert Journal 14: 286–299.
- Mercier, Charles. (1916). Are We Happier Than Our Forefathers?. The Hibbert Journal 15: 75–89.
- Mercier, Charles. (1916). Diet as a Factor in the Causation of Mental Disease. The Lancet 1: 561–565.
- Mercier, Charles. (1917). Sir Oliver Lodge and the Scientific World. The Hibbert Journal 15: 598–613.
- Mercier, Arthur. (1917). Sir Oliver Lodge and the Scientific World: A Rejoinder. The Hibbert Journal 16: 325–327.
- Mercier, Charles. (1918). The Irrelevance of Christianity and War. The Hibbert Journal 16: 555–563.
