= Ivor Lloyd Tuckett =

British professor of physiology, physician and skeptic

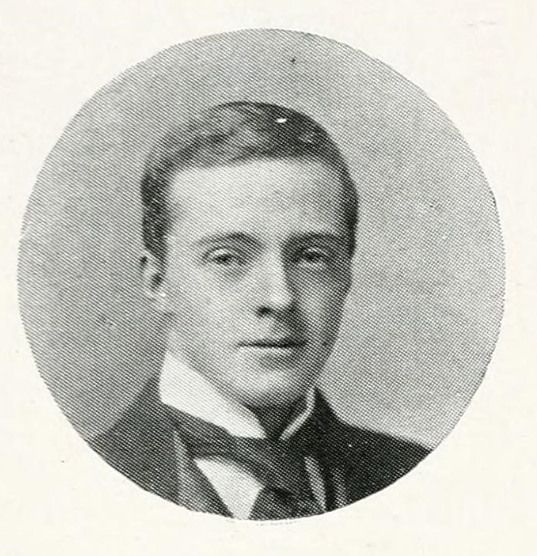
- Born: 1 February 1873
- Died: 28 November 1942 (aged 69)
- Occupation(s): Physiologist, skeptic

Ivor Lloyd Tuckett (1 February 1873 – 28 November 1942) was a British professor of physiology, physician, and skeptic.

== Career ==
Tuckett was born at Cleveland Gardens, London. He studied natural science and physiology at Trinity College, Cambridge between 1890 and 1894, where he was awarded the degrees of BA (1893-4), MA (1897), and MD (1910). He was a physician at University College Hospital and was made a Fellow of University College London.

Tuckett worked as an ophthalmologist in Norwich and on the Isle of Wight. He held an interest in yacht racing. From 1896 to 1910 Tuckett was an active researcher and published many papers in the Journal of Physiology. He wrote an important paper on the structure of non-meduallated nerve fibres. He was elected a member of The Physiological Society in 1896.

He married Anna Marie Christine Wickman on 6 April 1899.

== Skepticism ==
Tuckett became known as an exposer of the false claims of spiritualists. He is best known for his book The Evidence for the Supernatural: A Critical Study Made with "Uncommon Sense" (1911). The book exposed the tricks of fraudulent mediums and is a criticism of the claims of psychical research. It received a positive review in the British Medical Journal.

It was also positively reviewed in The Lancet which concluded "It is decidedly a book to be read by all who are interested in human psychology; and every practitioner of medicine ought to place himself in this category." Psychologist Joseph Jastrow highly recommended the book in a detailed review for The Dial. He described it as "thorough in execution, so broad in treatment, so acceptable in form and content, is a cause for congratulation in the rationalistic camp."

== Publications ==
Books

- The Evidence for the Supernatural: A Critical Study Made with "Uncommon Sense" 1911 unabridged edition with appendices A-R, 409 pages.
- Mysticism and the Way Out (1920)

Papers

- Tuckett, Ivor Lloyd. (1912-1913). Psychical Researchers and "the Will to Believe". Bedrock 1: 180–204.
- Tuckett, Ivor Lloyd. (1912-1913). The Illogical Position of Some Psychical Researchers. Bedrock 1: 470–487.
