= Daniel Dunglas Home =

British medium (1833–1886)

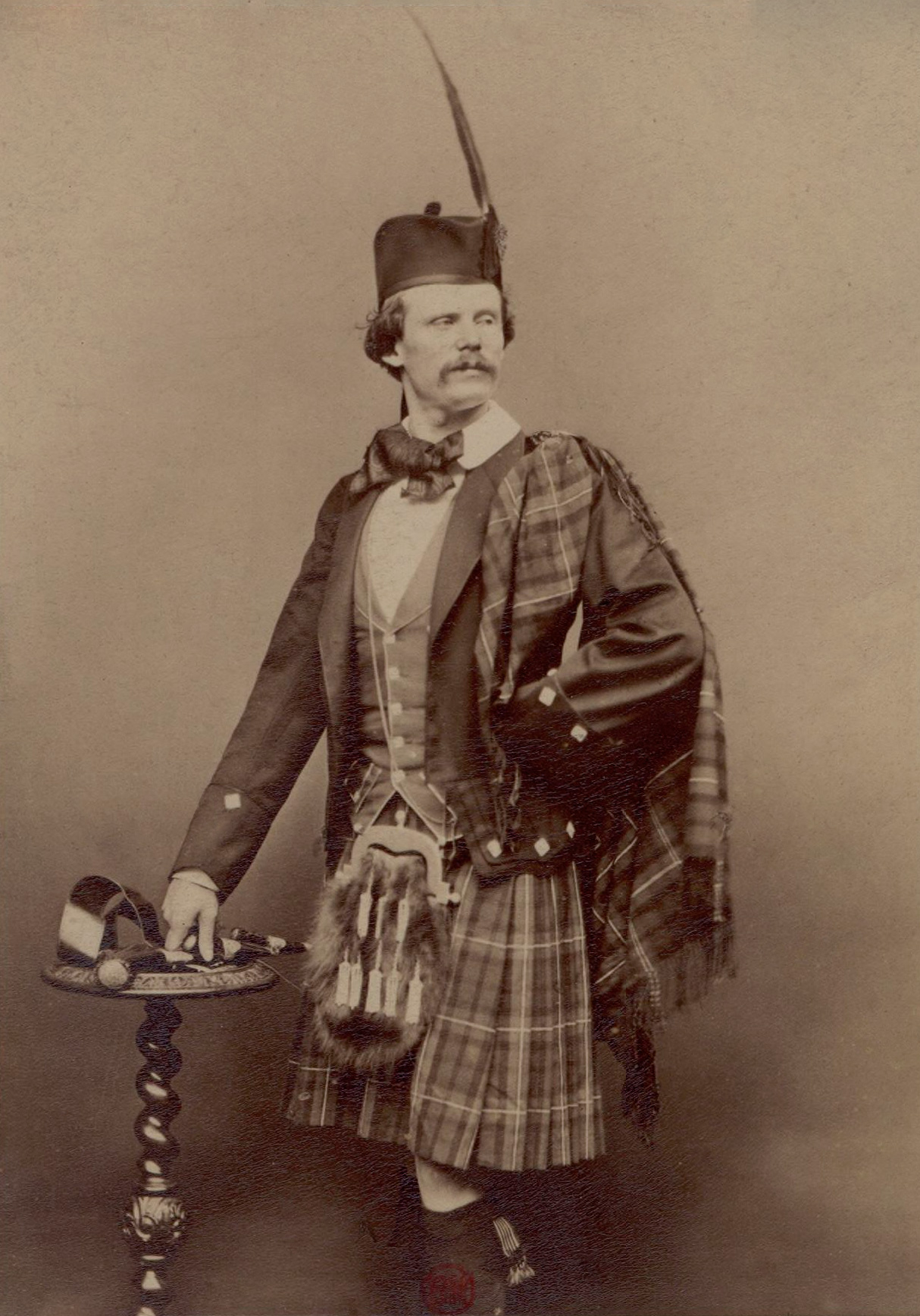
- Home by Nadar
- Born: 20 March 1833; Currie, Scotland, United Kingdom
- Died: 21 June 1886 (aged 53)
- Occupations: clairvoyant, medium, psychic
- Years active: 1851−1885
- Spouses: Alexandria de Kroll (m. 1858–1862) Julie de Gloumeline (m. 1871)
- Children: 1

Daniel Dunglas Home (pronounced Hume; 20 March 1833 – 21 June 1886) was a Scottish physical medium with the reported ability to levitate to a variety of heights, speak with the dead, and to produce rapping and knocks in houses at will. His biographer Peter Lamont opines that he was one of the most famous men of his era. Harry Houdini described him as "one of the most conspicuous and lauded of his type and generation" and "the forerunner of the mediums whose forte is fleecing by presuming on the credulity of the public." Home conducted hundreds of séances, which were attended by many eminent Victorians. There have been eyewitness accounts by séance sitters describing conjuring methods and fraud that Home may have employed.

== Family ==
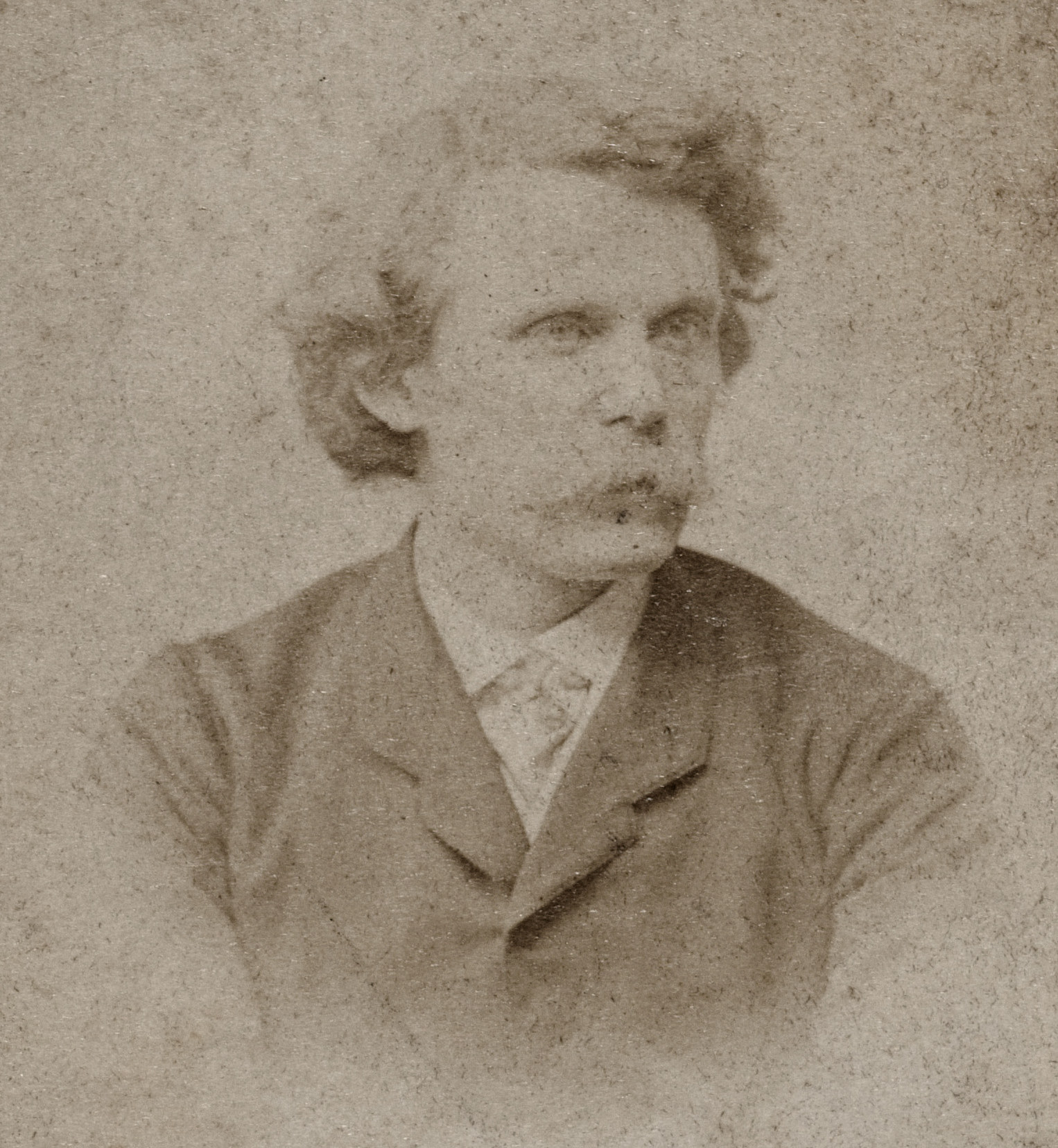
Daniel Dunglas Home, 1865-1870

Daniel Home's mother, Elizabeth ("Betsy") Home (née McNeill) was known as a seer in Scotland, as were many of her predecessors, like her great-uncle Colin Urquhart, and her uncle Mr. McKenzie. The gift of second sight was often seen as a curse, as it foretold instances of tragedy and death. Home's father, William Home, was the illegitimate son of Alexander, the 10th Earl of Home. Evidence supports the elder Home's illegitimacy, as various payments meant for William were made by the 10th Earl. Elizabeth and William were married when he was 19 years old, and found employment at the Balerno paper mill. The Homes moved into one of small houses built in the mill for the workforce, in Currie (six miles south-west of Edinburgh). William was described as a "bitter, morose and unhappy man" who drank, and was often aggressive towards his wife. Elizabeth had eight children while living in the mill house: six sons and two daughters, although their lives were not fully recorded. The eldest, John, later worked in the Balerno mill and eventually managed a paper mill in Philadelphia, Mary drowned in a stream at the age of 12 years in 1846, and Adam died at sea at the age of 17 while en route to Greenland, which Home says he saw in a vision and reportedly confirmed five months later.

== Early life ==
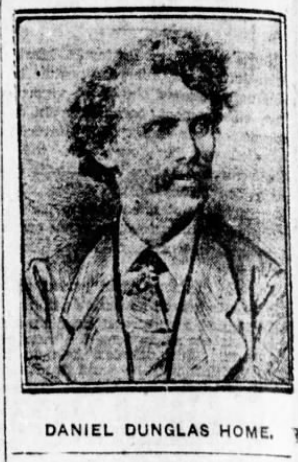
Photograph Portrait of Daniel Dunglas Home

Daniel Home was Elizabeth's third child, and was born on 20 March 1833. He was baptised by the Reverend Mr. Somerville three weeks after his birth at Currie Parish Church on 14 April 1833. The one-year-old Home was deemed a delicate child, having a "nervous temperament", and was passed to Elizabeth's childless sister, Mary Cook. She lived with her husband in the coastal town of Portobello, 3 miles (4.8 km) east of Edinburgh. According to Home, his cradle rocked by itself at the Cooks' house, and he had a vision of a cousin's death, who lived in Linlithgow, to the west of Edinburgh.

=== United States ===
Home pondering a skull in a staged studio photograph

Sometime between 1838 and 1841, Home's aunt and uncle decided to emigrate to the United States with their adopted son, sailing in the cheapest class of steerage as they could not afford a cabin. After landing in New York, the Cooks travelled to Greeneville, near Norwich, Connecticut. The red-haired and freckled Home attended school in Greeneville, where he was known as "Scotchy" by the other students. The 13-year-old Home did not join in sports games with other boys, preferring to take walks in the local woods with a friend called Edwin. The two boys read the Bible to each other and told stories, and made a pact stating that if one or the other were to die, they would try to make contact after death. Home and his aunt soon moved to Troy, New York, which is about 155 miles (249 km) from Greeneville, although Home in his own book stated it was 300 miles (480 km) away. Home lost contact with Edwin until one night when Home, according to Lamont, saw a brightly lit vision of him standing at the foot of the bed, which gave Home the feeling that his friend was dead. Edwin made three circles in the air before disappearing, and a few days later a letter arrived stating that Edwin had died of malignant dysentery three days before Home's vision.

A few years later Home and his aunt returned to Greeneville, and Elizabeth Home emigrated from Scotland to America with the surviving members of the family to live in Waterford, Connecticut, which was 12 miles (19 km) away from the Cook's house. Home and his mother's reunion was short-lived, as Elizabeth appeared to foretell her own death in 1850. Home said he saw his mother in a vision saying, "Dan, 12 o'clock", which was the time of her death. After Elizabeth's death Home turned to religion. His aunt was a Presbyterian, and held the Calvinist view that one's fate has been decided, so Home embraced the Wesleyan faith, which believed that every soul can be saved. Home's aunt resented Wesleyans so much that she forced Home to change to Congregationalist, which was not to her liking, either, but was more in line with her own religion. The house was reportedly disturbed by rappings and knocking similar to those that had occurred two years earlier at the home of the Fox sisters. Ministers were called to the Cooks' house: a Baptist, a Congregationalist, and even a Wesleyan minister, who all believed that Home was possessed by the Devil, although Home believed it was a gift from God. According to Home, the knocking did not stop, and a table started to move by itself, even though Home's aunt put a bible on it and then placed her full body weight on it. According to Lamont, the noises did not stop and were attracting the unwanted attention of Cook's neighbours, so Home was told to leave the house.

== Fame ==
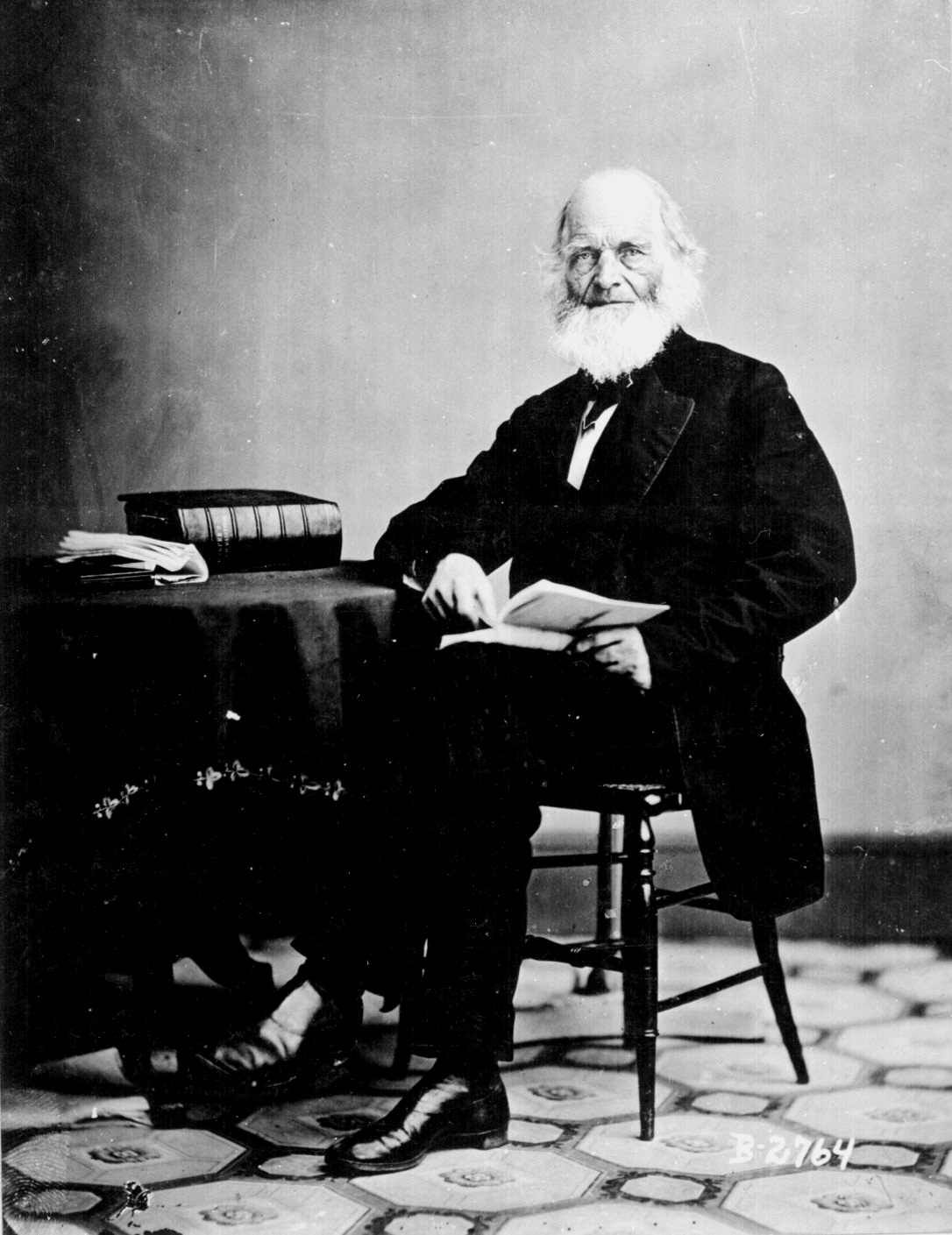
William Cullen Bryant, a poet, and editor of the New York Evening Post, who witnessed one of Home's séances

The 18-year-old Home stayed with a friend in Willimantic, Connecticut, and later Lebanon, Connecticut. Home held his first séance in March 1851, which was reported in a Hartford newspaper managed by W. R. Hayden, who wrote that the table moved without anyone touching it, and kept moving when Hayden physically tried to stop it. After the newspaper report, Home became well known in New England, travelling around healing the sick and communicating with the dead, although he wrote that he was not prepared for this sudden change in his life because of his supposed shyness.

Home never directly asked for money, although he lived very well on gifts, donations and lodging from wealthy admirers. He felt that he was on a "mission to demonstrate immortality", and wished to interact with his clients as one gentleman to another, rather than as an employee. In 1852, Home was a guest at the house of Rufus Elmer in Springfield, Massachusetts, giving séances six or seven times a day, which were visited by crowds of people, including a Harvard professor, David Wells, and the poet and editor of the New York Evening Post, William Cullen Bryant. They were all convinced of Home's credibility and wrote to the Springfield Republican newspaper stating that the room was well lit, full inspections were allowed, and said, "We know that we were not imposed upon nor deceived". It was also reported that at one of Home's demonstrations five men of heavy build (with a combined weight of 850 pounds) sat on a table, but it still moved, and others saw "a tremulous phosphorescent light gleam over the walls". Home was investigated by numerous people, such as Professor Robert Hare, the inventor of the oxy-hydrogen blowpipe, and John W. Edmonds, a trial court judge, who were sceptical, but later said they believed Home was not fraudulent.

In his book, Incidents in My Life, Home claims that in August 1852, in South Manchester, Connecticut, at the house of Ward Cheney, a successful silk manufacturer, he was reportedly seen to levitate twice and then rise to up to the ceiling, with louder rappings and knocking than ever before, more aggressive table movements and the sounds of a ship at sea in a storm, although persons present said that the room was badly lit so as to see the spirit lights.

New York was now interested in Home's abilities, so he moved to an apartment at Bryant Park on 42nd street. His most verbal critic in New York was William Makepeace Thackeray, the author of Vanity Fair. Thackeray dismissed Home's abilities as "dire humbug", and "dreary and foolish superstition", although Thackeray had been impressed when he saw a table turning. Home thought that Thackeray was "the most sceptical inquirer" he had ever met, and as Thackeray made his thoughts public, Home faced public scepticism and further scrutiny. Home travelled between Hartford, Springfield, and Boston during the next few months, and settled in Newburgh by the Hudson River in the summer of 1853. He resided at the Theological Institute, but took no part in any of the theological discussions held there, as he wanted to take a course in medicine. Dr. Hull funded Home's studies, and offered to pay Home five dollars a day for his séances, but Home refused, as always. His idea was to fund his work with a legitimate salary by practicing medicine, but he became ill in early 1854, and stopped his studies. Home was diagnosed with Tuberculosis, and his doctors recommended recuperation in Europe. His last séance in America was in March 1855, in Hartford, Connecticut, before he travelled to Boston and sailed to England on board the Africa, at the end of March.

== Europe ==
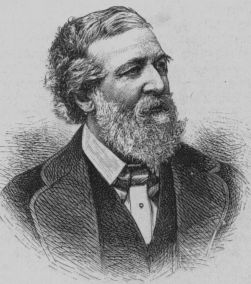
Robert Browning, who wrote "Sludge the Medium" about Home

Home's name was originally Daniel Home, but by the time he arrived in Europe he had lengthened it to Daniel Dunglas Home, in reference to the Scottish house of Home, of which his father claimed to be a part. In London, Home found a believer in spiritualism, William Cox, who owned a large hotel at 53, 54 and 55 Jermyn Street, London. As Cox was so enamoured of Home's abilities, he let him stay at the hotel without payment. Robert Owen, an 83-year-old social reformer, was also staying at the hotel, and introduced Home to many of his friends in London society. At the time Home was described as "tall and thin, with blue eyes and auburn hair, fastidiously dressed but seriously ill with consumption". Nevertheless, he held sittings for notable people in full daylight, moving objects that were some distance away.

Some early guests at Home's sittings included the scientist Sir David Brewster (who remained unconvinced), the novelists Sir Edward Bulwer-Lytton and Thomas Adolphus Trollope, and the Swedenborgian James John Garth Wilkinson. As well as Brewster, fellow scientists Michael Faraday and Thomas Huxley were prominent contemporary critics of Home's claims. It was the poet Robert Browning however, who proved to be one of Home's most adamant critics. After attending a séance of Home's, Browning wrote in a letter to The Times that: 'the whole display of hands, spirit utterances etc., was a cheat and imposture'. Browning gave his unflattering impression of Home in the poem, "Sludge the Medium" (1864). His wife, Elizabeth Barrett Browning, was convinced that the phenomena she witnessed were genuine and their discussions about Home were a constant source of disagreement. Frank Podmore writes of a Mr Merrifield's first-hand account of experiencing Home's fraudulence during a séance.

Home's fame grew, fuelled by his ostensible feats of levitation. William Crookes claimed Home could levitate five to seven feet above the floor. Crookes wrote "We all saw him rise from the ground slowly to a height of about six inches, remain there for about ten seconds, and then slowly descend."

In the following years Home travelled across continental Europe, and always as a guest of wealthy patrons. In Paris, he was summoned to the Tuileries to perform a séance for Napoleon III. He also performed for Queen Sophia of the Netherlands, who wrote: "I saw him four times...I felt a hand tipping my finger; I saw a heavy golden bell moving alone from one person to another; I saw my handkerchief move alone and return to me with a knot... He himself is a pale, sickly, rather handsome young man but without a look or anything which would either fascinate or frighten you. It is wonderful. I am so glad I have seen it..."

In 1866, Mrs Jane Lyon, a wealthy widow, adopted Home as her son, giving him £60,000 in an attempt to gain introduction into high society. Finding that the adoption did not change her social situation, Lyon changed her mind, and brought a suit for the return of her money from Home on the grounds that it had been obtained by spiritual influence. Under British law, the defendant bears the burden of proof in such a case, and proof was impossible since there was no physical evidence. The case was decided against Home, Mrs Lyon's money was returned, and the press pilloried Home's reputation. Home's high society acquaintances thought that he behaved like a complete gentleman throughout the ordeal, and he did not lose a single important friend.

Sir Arthur Conan Doyle, a spiritualist who supported the mediumship of Home, stated that he was unusual in that he had four different types of mediumship: direct voice (the ability to let spirits audibly speak); trance speaker (the ability to let spirits speak through oneself); clairvoyant (ability to see things that are out of view); and physical medium (moving objects at a distance, levitation, etc., which was the type of mediumship in which he had no equal).

According to Eric Dingwall, a lady acted as a medium and used to help Home during the séances attended by Henrietta Ada Ward.

== Alleged levitations ==
A feat of low levitation by Daniel Dunglas Home was recorded by paranormal historian Frank Podmore. "We all saw him rise from the ground slowly to a height of about six inches, remain there for about ten seconds, and then slowly descend."

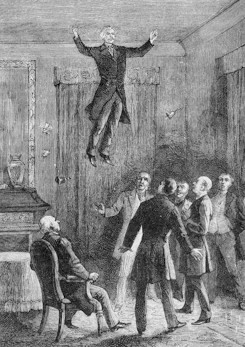
The levitation of Daniel Dunglas Home at Ward Cheney's house interpreted in a lithograph from Louis Figuier, Les Mystères de la science 1887

Home met one of his future closest friends in 1867; the young Lord Adare (later the 4th Earl of Dunraven). Adare was fascinated by Home, and began documenting the séances they held. The following year, Home was said to have levitated out of the third storey window of one room, and back in through the window of the adjoining room in front of three witnesses (Adare, Captain Wynne, and Lord Lindsay).

Lord Adare stated that Home "swung out and in" of a window in a horizontal position. However, John Sladek has pointed out that all three witnesses gave contradictory information about the levitation, even contradicting themselves about specific details:

The incident took place at 5 Buckingham Gate, Kensington (Adare); at Ashley Place, Westminster (Adare); at Victoria Street, Westminster (Lindsay). There was a ledge 4 inches wide below the windows (Adare); a ledge 1½ inches wide (Lindsay); no foothold at all (Lindsay); balconies 7 feet apart (Adare); no balconies at all (Lindsay). The windows were 85 feet from the street (Lindsay); 70 feet (Lindsay); 80 feet (Home); on the third floor (Adare); on the first floor (Adare). It was dark (Adare); there was a bright moonlight (Lindsay). Home was asleep in one room and the witnesses went into the next (Adare); Home left the witnesses in one room and went himself into the next (Adare).

Trevor H. Hall who researched the case in detail established that the levitation took place at Ashley Place in Westminster at a height of 35 feet and suggested rather than levitating Home had stepped across a gap of four feet between two iron balconies. Gordon Stein also noted that the gap between the two balconies was only four feet making passing between them entirely feasible.

Joseph McCabe wrote regarding the alleged levitation:

No one professes to have seen Home carried from window to window. Home told the three men who were present that he was going to be wafted, and he thus set up a state of very nervous expectation... Both Lord Crawford and Lord Adare say that they were warned. Then Lord Crawford says that he saw the shadow on the wall of Home entering the room horizontally; and as the moon, by whose light he professes to have seen the shadow, was at the most only three days old, his testimony is absolutely worthless. Lord Adare claims only that he saw Home, in the dark, "standing upright outside our window." In the dark—it was an almost moonless December night—one could not, as a matter of fact, say very positively whether Home was outside or inside; but, in any case, he acknowledges that there was a nineteen-inch window-sill outside the window, and Home could stand on that.

A few days before the levitation, scaring Lord Lindsay, Home had opened the same window, stepped out and stood on the outside ledge in the presence of two witnesses. Ivor Lloyd Tuckett argued that Home did this to provide "a rough sketch of the picture which he aimed at producing". Another possible natural explanation for Home's famous levitation was proposed by the psychical researcher Guy William Lambert who suggested he had attached a rope to the chimneys on the roof of the building, and hung the rope down unseen to the third floor. During the alleged levitation Home "swung out and in" the room by using a double rope maneuver. Lambert's rope hypothesis was supported by the magician John Booth.

Arthur Conan Doyle said there were many cases on record of Home levitating, but skeptics assert the alleged levitations occurred in darkened conditions susceptible to trickery.

Science historian Sherrie Lynne Lyons has stated that a possible explanation for Home's alleged levitation phenomena was revealed in the twentieth century by Clarence E. Willard (1882–1962). Willard revealed his technique in 1958 to members of the Society of American Magicians. He demonstrated how he could add two inches to his height by stretching. According to Lyons "it is quite likely that [Home] used a similar technique to the one that Willard used decades later".

Author Donald Serrell Thomas has asserted that Jean Eugène Robert-Houdin, the French stage magician was refused admission to Home's séances. In opposition to this, spiritualists have said that Houdin was unable to explain the phenomena at a Home séance. Regarding both these claims, Peter Lamont has noted:

It is probably worth noting, if only to avoid confusion, that such claims (much like those made by spiritualists that conjurors were unable to explain the phenomena) were often unfounded. For example, spiritualists claimed that Robert-Houdin had been unable to explain what happened at a Home seance, and critics claimed that Home had refused an invitation to perform in front of Robert-Houdin. There is, however, not a shred of evidence for either of these claims.

Historian Simon During has suggested the levitation of Home was a magic trick, influenced by Robert-Houdin.

== Critical reception ==
=== Allegations of fraud ===
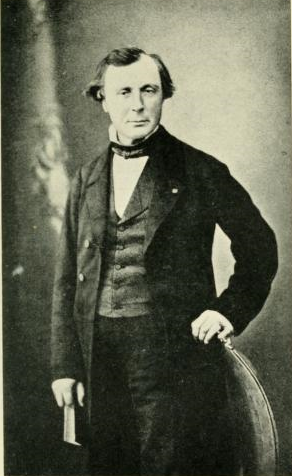
Dr. Barthez

It is often claimed in parapsychology and spiritualist books that Home was never caught in fraud. However, skeptics have stated that this claim does not hold up to scrutiny as Home was caught utilizing tricks by different witnesses on different occasions. Gordon Stein has noted that "While the statement that Home was never caught in fraud has been made many times, it simply is not true... It is simply that Home was never publicly exposed in fraud. Privately, he was caught in fraud several times. In addition, there are natural explanations both possible and likely for each of his phenomena."

At a séance in the house of the solicitor John Snaith Rymer in Ealing in July 1855, a sitter (Frederick Merrifield) observed that a "spirit-hand" was in fact a false limb attached on the end of Home's arm. Merrifield also claimed to have observed Home use his foot in the séance room.

The poet Robert Browning and his wife Elizabeth attended a séance on 23, July 1855 in Ealing with the Rymers. In 1895, after the deaths of Robert and Elizabeth, the journalist Frederick Greenwood alleged that Browning had told him that during the séance he had taken hold of a luminous object that appeared above the edge of the table, which turned out to be Home's naked foot. Later Browning's son Robert, in a letter to the London Times, 5 December 1902, also referred to the incident, saying that Browning had caught hold of Home's foot under the table. The allegation was repeated by Harry Houdini and later writers. But detailed descriptions of the séance written soon afterwards by Robert and Elizabeth make no mention of any such incident. Browning's account states that, although he was promised that he would be allowed to hold a "spirit-hand," the promise was not kept.

Writing in the journal for the Society for Psychical Research, Count Perovsky-Petrovo-Solovovo described a letter by Dr. Barthez, a physician in the court of Empress Eugenie, which claimed a sitter Morio de l'lle caught Home using his foot to fake supposed spirit effects during a séance in Biarritz in 1857. Home wore thin shoes, easy to take off and draw on, and also cut socks that left the toes free. "At the appropriate moment he takes off one of his shoes and with his foot pulls a dress here, a dress there, rings a bell, knocks one way and another, and, the thing done, quickly puts his shoe on again." Home positioned himself between the empress and Napoleon III. One of the séance sitters known as General Fleury also suspected that Home was utilizing trickery and asked to leave but returned unobserved to watch from another door behind Home. He saw Home slip his foot from his shoe and touch the arm of the Empress, who believed it to be one of her dead children. The observer stepped forward and revealed the fraud, and Home was conducted out of the country: "The order was to keep the incident secret." The allegations described by Dr. Barthez and General Fleury are second hand and have caused dispute between psychical researchers and skeptics.

The journalist Delia Logan who attended a séance with Home in London claimed that Home had used a phosphorus trick. During the séance luminous hands were observed and the host told Logan that had seen Home place a small bottle upon the mantle piece. The host slipped the bottle into his pocket and when examined the next day, it was found to contain phosphorus oil.

The neoclassical sculptor Hiram Powers who was a convinced spiritualist attended a séance with Home, but wrote a letter to Elizabeth Browning claiming Home had faked the table-turning movements.

=== Speculations on trickery ===
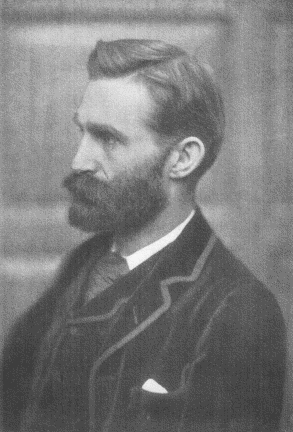
Frank Podmore, a skeptic of Home's mediumship

The researchers Frank Podmore (1910), Milbourne Christopher (1970), Trevor H. Hall (1984) and Gordon Stein (1993) were convinced that Home was a fraud and have provided a source of speculation on the ways in which he could have duped his séance sitters.

Skeptics have criticized the lighting conditions of Home's séances. Home and his followers claimed that some of the séances took place in "light" but this was nothing more than a few candles, or some glow from a fireplace or open window. Home would adjust the lighting to his needs with no objections from his séance sitters. For example, there is this report from a witness: "The room was very dark ... Home's hands were visible only as a faint white heap". Home selected the séance sitters who sat next to him, his hands and feet were not controlled and according to Frank Podmore "no precautions were taken against trickery."

Home was never searched before or after his séances. Science historian Sherrie Lynne Lyons wrote that the glowing or light-emitting hands in his séances could easily be explained by the rubbing of oil of phosphorus on his hands. It has been suggested that the "spirit hands" in the séances of Home were made of gloves stuffed with a substance. Robert Browning believed they were attached to Home's feet. Home was a sculptor and his studio in Rome contained sculpted hands. Lyons has speculated that he may have substituted the sculptor hands, leaving his real hands free to perform phenomena in the séance room.

Home was known for his alleged feat of handling a heated lump of coal taken from a fire. The magician Henry Evans speculated that this was a juggling trick, performed using a hidden piece of platinum. Hereward Carrington described Evans hypothesis as "certainly ingenious" but pointed out William Crookes an experienced chemist was present at a séance whilst Home performed the feat and would have known how to distinguish the difference between coal and platinum. Frank Podmore wrote that most of the fire feats could have easily been performed by conjuring tricks and sleight of hand but hallucination and sense-deception may have explained Crookes' claim about observing flames from Home's fingers.

=== William Crookes investigation ===
Between 1870 and 1873, chemist and physicist William Crookes conducted experiments to determine the validity of the phenomena produced by three mediums: Florence Cook, Kate Fox, and Home. Crookes' final report in 1874 concluded that the phenomena produced by all three mediums were genuine, a result which was roundly derided by the scientific establishment. Crookes recorded that he controlled and secured Home by placing his feet on the top of Home's feet. Crookes' method of foot control later proved inadequate when used with Eusapia Palladino, as she merely slipped her foot out and into her sturdy shoe. In addition, Crookes' motives, methods, and conclusions with regard to Florence Cook were called into question, both at the time and subsequently, casting doubt on his conclusions about Home. In a series of experiments in London at the house of Crookes in February 1875, the medium Anna Eva Fay managed to fool Crookes into believing she had genuine psychic powers. Fay later confessed to her fraud and revealed the tricks she had used.

Home was investigated by Crookes in a self-built laboratory at the rear of his house at Mornington Road, North London in 1871. No plans of the laboratory have been found and there is no contemporary description of it. Crookes wrote the board and spring balance experiment was a success with Home and had proven "beyond doubt" the existence of a "psychic force." However, the experiment could be easily dismissed as the result of vibrations caused by the passage of Euston trains in the large railway cutting near his house in London. The experiment was not repeatable and sometimes failed to produce any phenomena. The experiment was rejected and ridiculed by the scientific community for lack of scientific controls. In the experiment Home refused for Crookes to be near him and would draw attention to something on the other side of the room, or make conversation for diversionary signals.

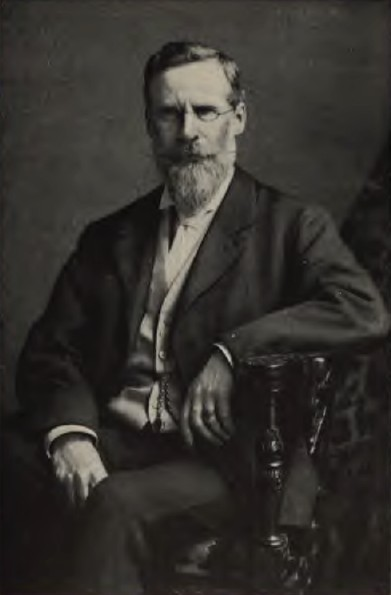
William Crookes tested Home in a series of experiments.

In 1871, Balfour Stewart in an article for Nature noted that the experiments were not conducted in broad daylight before a large unbiased audience and the results were inconclusive. Stewart suspected the phenomena observed were "subjective, rather than objective, occurring in the imaginations of those present rather than in the outward physical world." In the same year, J. P. Earwaker wrote a science review that heavily criticized the Crookes' experiments for their poor design concluding they were pseudoscientific. According to Earwaker "For in truth they are the very opposite of scientific. Even to call them unscientific is not strong enough; clumsy and futile are much nearer the truth."

The engineer Coleman Sellers questioned the origin and weight of the board used with the balance spring apparatus. Sellers wrote that a standard mahogany board weighs around thirteen and half pounds but the one used in Crookes' experiment may have been at fault at only six pounds. Crookes responded to Sellers claiming the board weighed six pounds and this was not a mistake, he also stated he had the board for about sixteen years and it was originally cut in a lumber yard.

P. H. Vanderweyde noted that Crookes was already a believer in psychic powers before he obtained the results of the experiments. Vanderweyde stated the spring balance used in Crookes' experiment was unreliable as it was easy to manipulate by deception and suggested he should repeat the experiment by using a chemical balance.

According to Barry Wiley during the board and spring balance experiment, Home refused for Crookes to sit near him and he was occupied by writing notes. Wiley suspected Home used resin on his finger tips to tamper with the apparatus which managed to fool Crookes into believing a psychic force was being displayed. Regarding Crookes, the magician Harry Houdini wrote:

There is not the slightest doubt in my mind that this brainy man was hoodwinked, and that his confidence was betrayed by the so-called mediums that he tested. His powers of observation were blinded and his reasoning faculties so blunted by his prejudice in favor of anything psychic or occult that he could not, or would not, resist the influence.

Historian Ruth Brandon in an article for the New Scientist noted that William Huggins, Serjeant Cox, Crooke's wife and daughter, his laboratory assistant, and a Mrs Humphrey were all present during the Crookes experiments with Home. However, Barry Wiley has written that when Crookes published his report on the experiments in the Quarterly Journal of Science in 1871 he did not mention all the names of the observers present in the room. Wiley has stated that four females were present during the experiments as was Crookes' brother and the original report by Crookes did not refer to any spirits but many years later in 1889 he revealed in his Notes of séances with D. D. Home the names of the observers and claimed Home was in communication with spirits.

Crookes' assistant was the glass blower Charles Henry Gimingham (1853–1890) who had built the experimental apparatus. Wiley suspected that Gimingham worked as a secret accomplice for Anna Eva Fay in her experiments with Crookes. Wiley noted that "Gimingham had free and open access to Crookes' laboratory and frequently worked there unsupervised with Crookes' full trust."

Joseph McCabe criticized the Crookes experiments for lack of scientific controls and wrote Home was "daily in and out of Crookes's laboratory, and it appears that he closely watched the development of the tests and was prepared in advance." Before the experiments, Crookes was present with Home whilst he changed dress but Frank Podmore noted this would not have prevented Home from slipping into his pocket apparatus to cheat on the experiments. Edward Clodd wrote that Home chose his séance sitters and "if test experiments were suggested, he imposed the conditions."

The physicist Victor Stenger commented that the experiments were poorly controlled; he gave the example of Home requesting all hands to be removed from the table whilst all those present complied. Stenger noted that "Crookes gullibly swallowed ploys such as this and allowed Home to call the shots... his desire to believe blinded him to the chicanery of his psychic subjects."

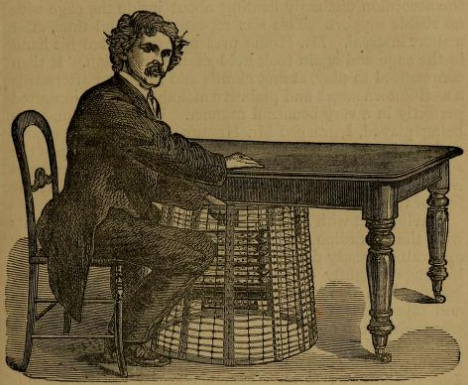
Home performing the accordion experiment

=== Accordion experiment ===
In the accordion experiment, Home sat at a table, with Crookes and another observer on either side of him, each with a foot on one of Home's feet. Home inserted his hand inside a wire cage that was pushed under the table. One of Home's hands was placed on the top of the table, and the other inside the cage which held an accordion on the non-key side, so the keyed end was hanging downwards. The accordion was reported to have played musical sounds. However, the amount of light in the room was not stated, and the accordion was not observed in good light. According to Frank Podmore there was no evidence the accordion played at all, as the keys were not observed to have moved. Podmore suggested the musical sounds could have come from an automatic instrument that Home had concealed.

In 1871, William Benjamin Carpenter wrote a critical evaluation of the Crookes experiments with Home in the Quarterly Review. Carpenter wrote that although Crookes, his assistant and Sergeant Cox claimed to have observed the accordion float in the cage; Dr. Huggins did not testify to this, and no information was given to whether the keys and bellows were seen to move. According to Carpenter no solid explanation could be given until the experiment is repeated, however, he suggested that the accordion feat that Home performed may have been a conjuring trick achieved with one hand. Carpenter concluded that Crookes should repeat the experiment in open daylight without the cage in the presence of other witnesses.

J. P. Earwaker heavily criticized the design of the accordion experiment as it took place under a dining room table. Earwaker who read Crookes' report noted that "no reason for this strangest of all strange positions is even hinted at." He also wrote "it never occurred to [Crookes] to notice whether the keys were depressed or not... it would be obvious that if the keys were not pressed down, it was impossible for the music really to have come from the accordion, and its true source must have been looked for elsewhere."

The magician John Nevil Maskelyne also criticized the design of the experiment for taking place under a table. The psychologist Millais Culpin wrote the experiment was not scientific and questioned why the experiment was done under the table instead of in a more convenient position on top of it. Before the accordion experiment with Crookes, Home had performed the accordion feat for over fifteen years under various conditions but always under his control. It was reported by sitters and Crookes that Home's accordion played only two pieces, Home Sweet Home and The Last Rose of Summer. Both contain only one-octave.

The psychical researcher Hereward Carrington and spiritualism expert Herbert Thurston have claimed the accordion experiment was not the result of deliberate fraud. This is in opposition to magicians and skeptical researchers who evaluated Crookes' reports from the experiment.

The magician Henry Evans suggested the accordion feat was Home playing a musical box, attached to his leg. Skeptic Joseph McCabe wrote that Home may have placed a musical box in his pocket or on the floor. According to McCabe "the opening and shutting of the accordion could be done by hooks, or loops of black silk. So with the crowning miracle, when Home withdrew his hand, and the accordion was seen suspended in the air, moving about in the cage (under the dark table). It was probably hooked on to the table." The 19th-century British medium Francis Ward Monck was caught using a music box in his séances that he had hidden in his trousers. The fraudulent medium Henry Slade also played an accordion while held with one hand under a table. Slade and Home played the same pieces. They had at one time lived near each other in the U.S.A. The magician Chung Ling Soo exposed how Slade had performed the trick.

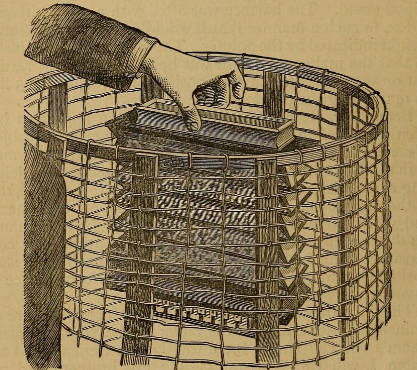
Sketch showing how Home held the accordion

The writer Amos Norton Craft suggested a false keyboard:

The trick has since been often repeated and explained. The medium must have the semblance of key-board, made of some light material, concealed in his coat sleeve or about his person. This he attaches to the bottom of the accordion which he holds in his hand. Then when unobserved, while the learned professor is "taking down his notes" for the public press, he reverses the accordion, and attaching the false keyboard on the bottom by means of a small hook attached to it, fastens it to the side of the basket; having now the real keyboard in his hand he is able to produce musical sounds. Afterward the accordion floated about in the basket under the table, without the contact of Mr. Home's hand. This subsequent phenomenon was given to avoid immediate examination of the first by keeping Professor Crookes in suspense, and giving the medium time to reverse the instrument and conceal in his clothing the false key-board which had been on the bottom of the instrument. The accordion was suspended by means of a small hook fastened to dark thread, which would be invisible in the gas-light.

Researcher Ronald Pearsall in his book The Table-Rappers (1972) suggested that a loop of catgut was attached to the accordion so Home could turn it round. Paul Kurtz wrote that other mediums had used a loop of catgut to obtain a similar effect with the accordion.

Other researchers have suspected that a secret accomplice was involved. The magician Carlos María de Heredia claimed to have replicated the accordion feat of Home and suggested it was a trick performed by an accomplice playing a hidden accordion. Ruth Brandon considered the possibility of an accomplice playing a concertina, or Home playing a hidden music box. However, Brandon dismissed the accomplice hypothesis as unlikely.

Skeptic James Randi stated that Home was caught cheating on a few occasions, but the episodes were never made public, and that the accordion feat was a one-octave mouth organ that Home concealed under his large moustache. Randi writes that one-octave mouth organs were found in Home's belongings after his death. According to Randi, "around 1960", William Lindsay Gresham told Randi he had seen these mouth organs in the Home collection at the Society for Psychical Research.

Gordon Stein wrote:

Home could easily have produced the sound of the accordion (concertina) by the use of a small harmonica concealed in his mouth. The up and down movement of the accordion could easily have been produced by catching the bottom of the accordion in a loop of black thread, or on a hook.

The claim that the accordion feat was performed by Home using a small harmonica was originally suggested by J. M. Robertson in 1891. The psychical researcher Eric Dingwall who catalogued Home's collection on its arrival at the SPR did not record the presence of the mouth organs, and Lamont speculates that it is unlikely Dingwall would have missed these or not made them public. The accordion in the SPR collection is not the actual one Home used. They display a duplicate.

== Personal life ==
Home married twice. In 1858, he married Alexandria de Kroll ("Sacha"), the 17-year-old daughter of a noble Russian family, in Saint Petersburg. His Best Man was the writer Alexandre Dumas. They had a son, Gregoire ("Grisha"), but Alexandria fell ill with tuberculosis, and died in 1862. In October 1871, Home married for the second time to Julie de Gloumeline, a wealthy Russian, whom he also met in St Petersburg. In the process, he converted to the Greek Orthodox faith.

In 1869 Lord Adare revealed in his diaries under the title Experiences in Spiritualism with D. D. Home that he had slept in the same bed with Home. Many of the diary entries contain erotic homosexual overtones between Adare and Home.

== Death ==
Home retired due to ill health; the tuberculosis, from which he had suffered for much of his life, was advancing and he said his powers were failing. He died on 21 June 1886 at the age of 53 and was buried in the Russian cemetery of St. Germain-en-Laye, in Paris.

== In popular culture ==
Home, played by the Australian actor Lewis Fiander, is a major character in 'The Frontiers of Science', an episode of the 1976 Granada TV series Victorian Scandals (the episode is about the relationship between Florence Cook, William Crookes and Home).
