= Drummer of Tedworth =

Alleged poltergeist manifestation (1681)

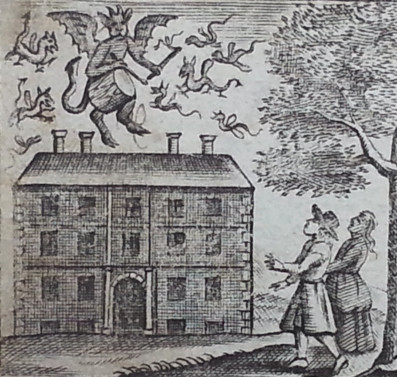
The devil and the drum, from the frontispiece to the third edition of Saducismus Triumphatus (1700)

The Drummer of Tedworth is the case of an alleged poltergeist manifestation in the West Country of England, recorded by Joseph Glanvill in his book Saducismus Triumphatus (1681).

== History ==
Early accounts reported that in 1661 a local landowner, John Mompesson, owner of a house in the town of Tedworth (now called Tidworth, in Wiltshire), had brought a lawsuit against an unlicensed vagrant drummer William Drury, whom he accused of collecting money by false pretences. After he had won judgment against the drummer, the drum was turned over to Mompesson by the local bailiff. Mompesson then found his house plagued by nocturnal drumming noises. It was alleged that the drummer had brought these plagues of noise upon Mompesson's head by witchcraft. Drury was said to have been associated with a band of gypsies.

Glanvill, who visited the house in 1663, had claimed to have heard strange scratching noises under a bed in the children's room.

On Christmas Day 1667, Samuel Pepys, in his diary, records his wife, Elizabeth, reading the story to him. He found it to be "a strange story of spirits and worth reading indeed."

In 1668, Glanvill published one of the earlier versions of Saducismus Triumphatus, his A Blow at Modern Sadducism ... To which is added, The Relation of the Fam'd Disturbance by the Drummer, in the House of Mr. John Mompesson.

John Wesley made reference to the Drummer at Tedworth in his journal:

The famous instance of this, which has been spread far and wide, was the drumming in Mr Mompesson's house at Tedworth; who, it was said, acknowledged, 'It was all a trick, and that he had found out the whole contrivance.' Not so, my eldest brother, then at Christ Church, Oxon, inquired of Mr Mompesson, his fellow collegian, 'Whether his father had acknowledged this or not.' He answered, 'The resort of gentlemen to my father's house was so great, he could not bear the expense. He therefore took no pains to confute the report, that he had found out the cheat: although he and I, and all the family knew the account which was published, to be punctually true.'

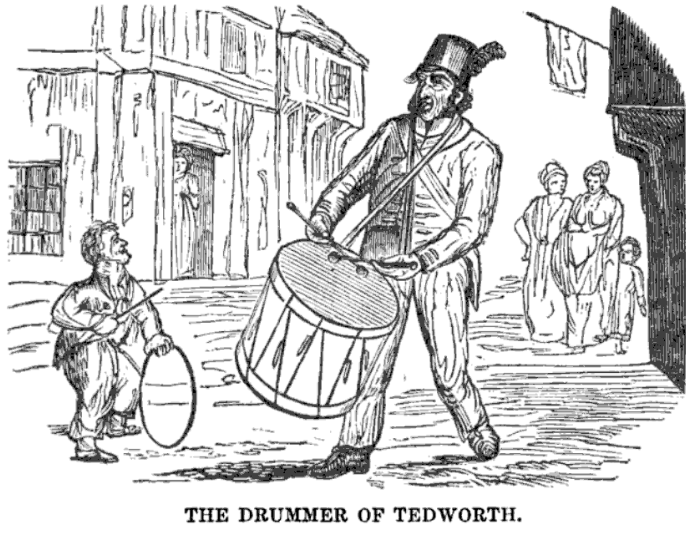
Sketch of the Drummer of Tedworth (1837)

== Critical reception ==
In 1716 the Whig writer and politician Joseph Addison wrote a play The Drummer inspired by events at Tedworth. However, he updated the story to the recent War of the Spanish Succession and gave a rational explanation for the ghostly drumming; a returning veteran thought killed in action does it to scare off two suitors from his now wealthy "widow".

Charles Mackay, in his Extraordinary Popular Delusions and the Madness of Crowds (1841), considered the phenomena to be a hoax produced by confederates of the drummer, and suggested Mompesson was easily deceived.

Amos Norton Craft (1881) also suggested that the phenomena were the result of trickery:

We are to remember also, that the house of Mr. Mompesson contained several servants who doubtless possessed a good degree of human nature; Mr. Mompesson had caused the arrest and imprisonment of a member of a band of gypsies, who were intensely enraged at him on that account that the disturbance ceased as soon as the gypsy was transported beyond the sea and his associates had no farther hope of his release; that these manifestations began again as soon as the gypsy returned from transportation; that the gypsy professed to be the cause of the disturbance, and that the excited imagination would naturally add to the manifestations which the enraged trickster really produced.

Addington Bruce (1908) has argued that the phenomenon was fraudulently manufactured by Mompesson's own children, especially his oldest daughter, a girl of ten. Bruce wrote that the noises and movement of objects were reminiscent of pranks and often occurred in the children's bedroom. Bruce noted that Glanvill "passed only one night in the haunted house, and of his several experiences there is none that cannot be set down to fraud plus imagination, with the children the active agents."

Andrew Lang of the Society for Psychical Research wrote that "the Drummer was suspected, but, consciously or not, the children were probably the agents."

== See also ==
- Cock Lane ghost
- Old Rectory, Epworth
