= Gordon Stein =

American author and activist

Gordon Stein (April 30, 1941 – August 27, 1996) was an American author, physiologist, and activist for atheism and religious skepticism.

== Biography ==
Stein was born in New York to Jewish parents, and from an early age took an interest in science. He earned degrees in psychology and zoology, a doctorate in physiology from Ohio State University and master's degrees in Management and Library Science from University of Rochester, Adelphi College, and the University of California at Los Angeles.

He was an author of books for secular humanist and rationalist publications, he also was a critic of claims of paranormal phenomena. Stein was an outspoken atheist and publicly debated Christian apologists such as Greg Bahnsen. He served as editor of the American Rationalist and was the librarian of the Center for Inquiry, which houses both the Committee for the Scientific Investigation of Claims of the Paranormal (CSICOP) and the Council for Secular Humanism (CSH).

Stein died of lung cancer in Buffalo General Hospital.

== Paranormal ==
He published articles critical of the paranormal in the Skeptical Inquirer. His book The Sorcerer of Kings: The Case of Daniel Dunglas Home and William Crookes (1993) is a debunking of the mediumship of Daniel Douglas Home and the spiritualist claims of William Crookes. Stein suspected that Crookes was too ashamed to admit he had been duped by the medium Florence Cook, or that he had conspired with her for sexual favors. He also suggested that Crookes had conspired with Anna Eva Fay. He noted that contrary to popular belief, Home had been exposed as a fraud on several occasions. Stein concluded that all the feats of Home were conjuring tricks. In a review, biographer William Hodson Brock wrote that Stein made his "case against Crookes and Home clearly and logically."

He also edited the Encyclopedia of the Paranormal (1996), which received positive reviews. Stein had documented the tricks of fraudulent mediums. He discovered that a levitation photograph of Carmine Mirabelli had been chemically retouched.

== Debate ==
In 1985, Gordon Stein debated Dr. Greg Bahnsen at the University of California (Irvine), on the topic, "The Great Debate: Does God Exist?" The Bahnsen Institute maintains the audio files of the debate in mp3 format, and several video versions are available on YouTube.

== Publications ==
- Robert Ingersoll: A Checklist (1969)
- Free Thought in the United States: A Descriptive Bibliography (1978)
- Anthology of Atheism and Rationalism (Editor, with Marshall Brown, 1980)
- Freethought in the United Kingdom and the Commonwealth: A Descriptive Bibliography (1981)
- Encyclopedia of Unbelief (Editor, 1985)
- A Second Anthology of Atheism and Rationalism (Editor, 1987)
- God Pro and Con: A Bibliography of Atheism (Editor, 1990)
- The Sorcerer of Kings: The Case of Daniel Dunglas Home and William Crookes (1993)
- Encyclopedia of Hoaxes (Editor, 1993)
- Hoaxes! Dupes, Dodges & Other Dastardly Deceptions (1995)
- Encyclopedia of the Paranormal (Editor, 1996)
