= William Crookes =

English chemist and physicist (1832–1919)

Sir William Crookes OM FRS
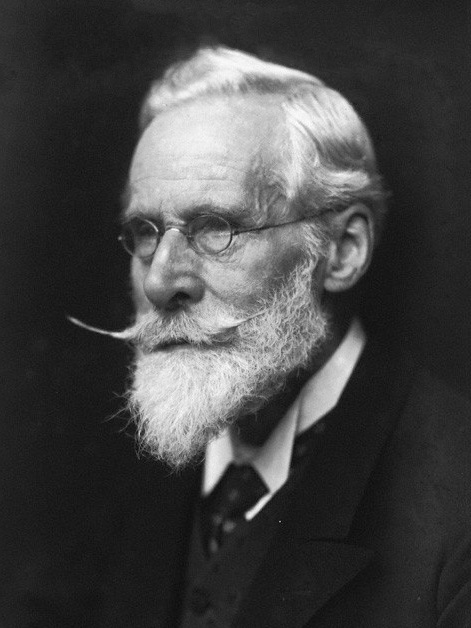
- Crookes in 1906

41st President of the Royal Society
- In office 1913–1915
- Preceded by: Archibald Geikie
- Succeeded by: J. J. Thomson

6th President of the Society for Psychical Research
- In office 1896–1899
- Preceded by: William James
- Succeeded by: Frederic W. H. Myers

Personal details
- Born: 17 June 1832 London, England
- Died: 4 April 1919 (aged 86) London, England
- Education: Royal College of Chemistry
- Scientific career
- Known for: Discovering thallium (1861); Crookes radiometer (1873); Crookes tube (1875); Discovering plasma (1879); Inventing the spinthariscope (1903); Inventing gemstone irradiation (1905)
- Spouse: Ellen Humphrey (m. 1856)
- Children: 9
- Awards: Royal Medal (1875); Davy Medal (1888); Albert Medal (1899); Copley Medal (1904); Elliott Cresson Medal (1912)
- Honours: Order of Merit (1910)
- Fields: Chemistry; physics
- Workplaces: Royal College of Chemistry (1849–1854); Radcliffe Observatory (1854–1855); Chester Diocesan Training College (1855–1856)

Sir William Crookes (/krʊks/; 17 June 1832 – 4 April 1919) was an English chemist and physicist who attended the Royal College of Chemistry, now part of Imperial College London, and worked on spectroscopy. He was a pioneer of vacuum tubes, inventing the Crookes tube, which was made in 1875. Observing cathode rays generated in these tubes, Crookes posited that "radiant matter" was a unique fourth state of matter, a foundational contribution to plasma physics.

He is credited with discovering the element thallium, announced in 1861, with the help of spectroscopy. He was also the first to describe the spectrum of terrestrial helium, in 1865. Crookes was the inventor of the Crookes radiometer, but did not discern the true explanation of the phenomenon he detected.

According to historian William H. Brock, Crookes's later work on ultraviolet eye protection arose from 1907 Royal Society investigations into cataracts among furnace and glass workers. Developed in partnership with Wigmore Street opticians Sir William Wingate and Frank Melson Wingate, by 1918 the resulting 'Crookes Lenses' under Melson Wingate Ltd combined scientific research with practical industrial safety as a manufactured product. Brock argues that this work laid the foundation for the modern sunglasses industry, while the lenses themselves were applied to industrial, military and aviation applications for much of the twentieth century, until modern sunglass branding gradually superseded them.

== Biography ==
=== Early years ===
William Crookes was born in London in 1832, the eldest of eight surviving children (eight others died young) of Joseph Crookes (1792–1889), a wealthy tailor and real estate investor of north-country origin, and his second wife, Mary (née Scott; 1806–1884). Joseph Crookes's father, William (1734–1814), was also a tailor, whose grandfather, John Crookes (b. 1660), had been Mayor of Hartlepool, County Durham on three occasions.

Joseph Crookes had had five children with his first wife; two sons from that marriage, Joseph and Alfred, took over the tailoring business, leaving William free to choose his own path. In 1848, at age 16, Crookes entered the Royal College of Chemistry (now the Imperial College chemistry department) to study organic chemistry. Crookes lived with his parents about three miles from the College in Oxford Street. His father's shop was about half a mile away. Crookes paid £25 for his first year's tuition and had to provide his own apparatus and some of the more expensive chemicals. At the end of his first year, Crookes won the Ashburton scholarship which covered his second year's tuition. At the end of his second year, Crookes became a junior assistant to August Wilhelm von Hofmann, doing laboratory demonstrations and helping with research and commercial analysis. In October 1851, Crookes was promoted to senior assistant, a position he held until 1854.

Although Crookes revered Hofmann, he did not share his primary interest in organic chemistry. One of Crookes's students was the Reverend John Barlow, Secretary of the Royal Institution, who chose to take a course in analytical chemistry. Through Barlow, Crookes met scientists such as George Gabriel Stokes and Michael Faraday. Such friends reinforced Crookes's interest in optical physics which was respected by Hofmann. By 1851, Crookes's interest in photography and optics caused his father to build him a laboratory in the garden at home for his research.

When Crookes embarked upon original work, it wasn't in organic chemistry, but rather into new compounds of selenium. These were the subject of his first published papers, in 1851. He worked with Manuel Johnson at the Radcliffe Observatory in Oxford in 1854, where he adapted the recent innovation of wax paper photography to machines built by Francis Ronalds to continuously record meteorological parameters. In 1855 he was appointed lecturer in chemistry at the Chester Diocesan Training College.

In April 1856 Crookes married Ellen, daughter of William Humphrey of Darlington. Since staff at Chester were required to be bachelors, he had to resign his position. William's father, Joseph Crookes, gave the couple a house at 15 Stanley Street, Brompton. Ellen's mother, Mrs. Humphrey, lived with them for the rest of her life, nearly forty years. A devoted couple, William and Ellen Crookes had six sons and three daughters. Their first child, Alice Mary (born 1857, later Mrs. Cowland) remained unmarried for forty years, living with her parents and working as an assistant to her father. Two of Crookes's sons became engineers, and two lawyers.

Married and living in London, Crookes sought to support his new family through independent work as a photographic chemist. In 1859, he founded the Chemical News, a science magazine which he edited for many years and conducted on much less formal lines than was usual for the journals of scientific societies. In his Chemical News Crookes published Faraday's A Course of Six Lectures on the Various Forces of Nature and in 1860 he edited the lectures and published it as a book (he also wrote the Preface). Between 1864 and 1869, he was also involved with the Quarterly Journal of Science. At various times he edited the Journal of the Photographic Society and the Photographic News.

=== Middle years ===
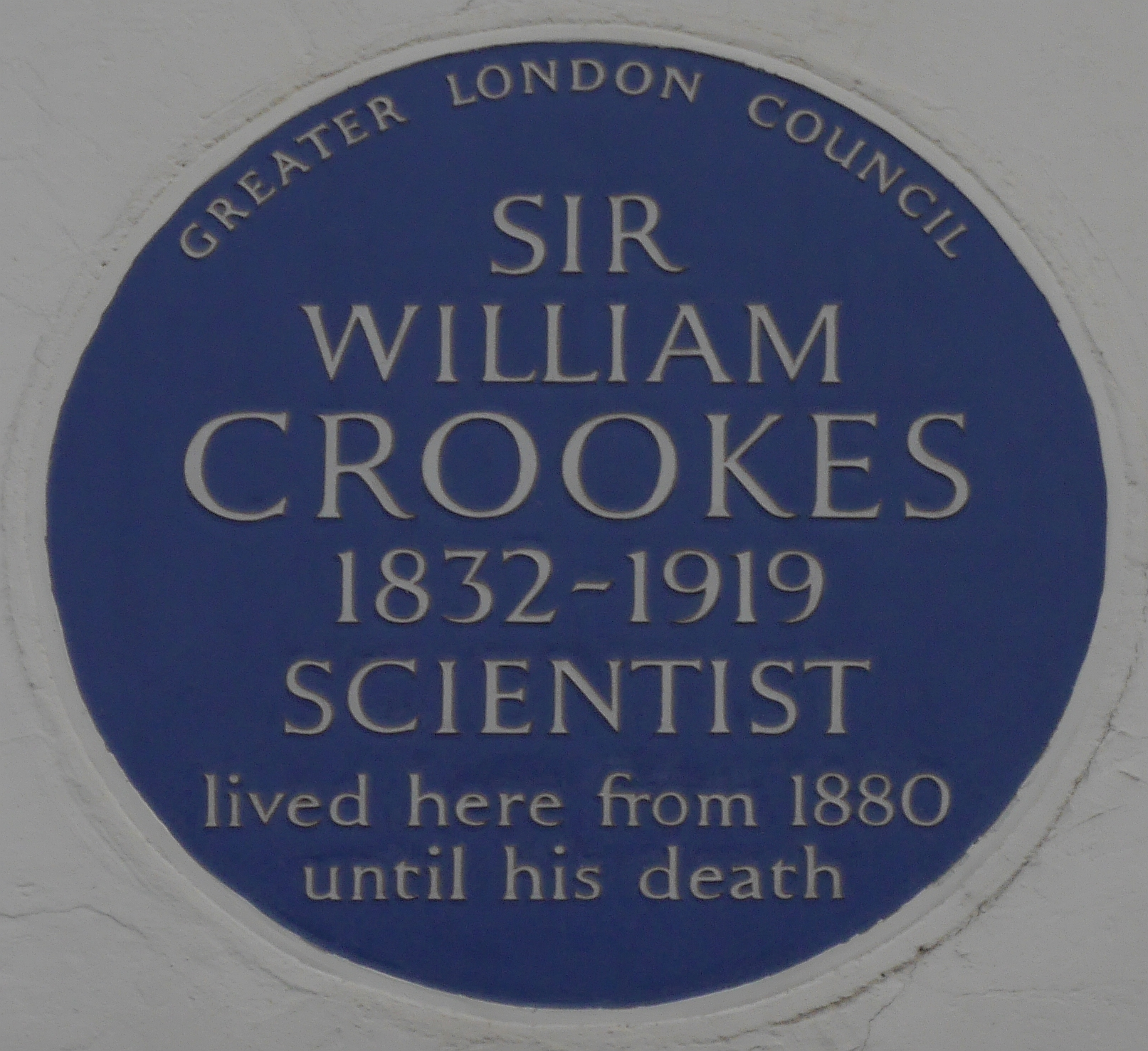
Blue plaque, 7 Kensington Park Gardens, London

Crookes was effective in experimentation. The method of spectral analysis, introduced by Bunsen and Kirchhoff, was received by Crookes with great enthusiasm and to great effect.

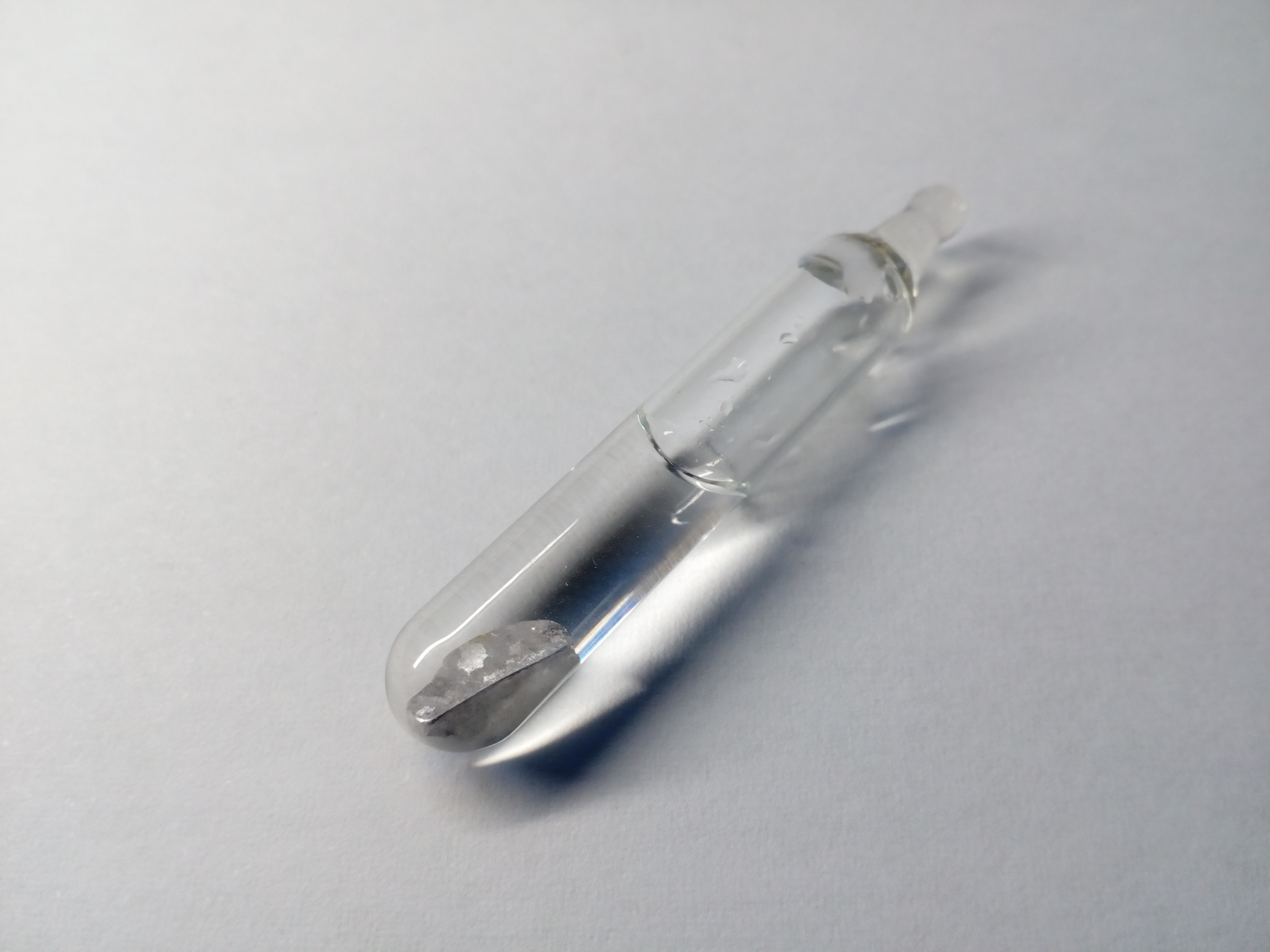
The element thallium, discovered by Crookes

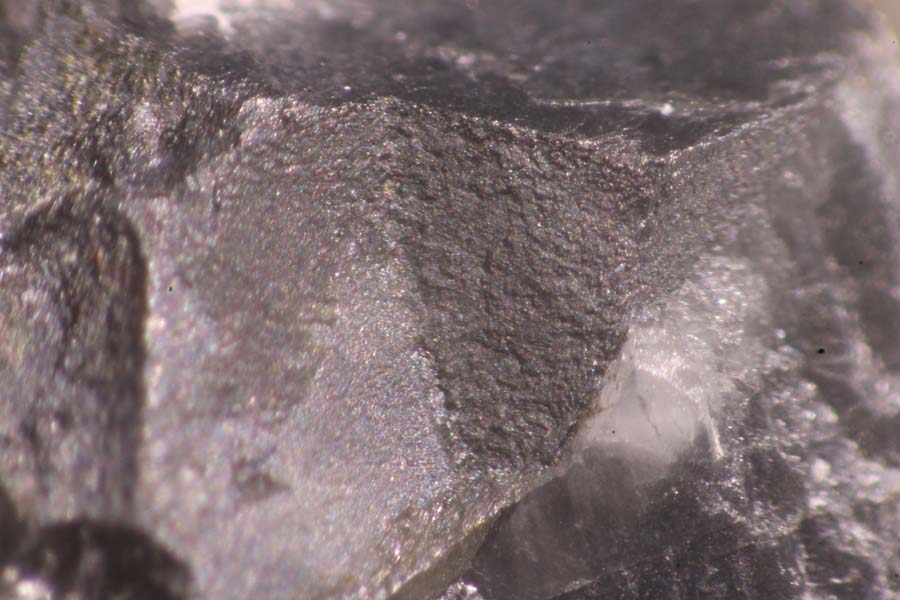
The mineral crookesite, a selenide of copper, thallium and silver (Cu_{7}(Tl, Ag)Se_{4}), named for Crookes

His first important discovery was that of the element thallium, made with the help of flame spectroscopy. Crookes discovered a previously unknown element with a bright green emission line in its spectrum. He named the element thallium, from Greek θαλλός, thallós, meaning "a green shoot or twig". Crookes's findings were published on 30 March 1861.

Thallium was also independently discovered by Frenchman Claude Auguste Lamy, who had the advantage of access to large amounts of materials via his brother-in-law, Charles Frédéric Kuhlmann. Both Crookes and Lamy isolated the element in 1862.

Crookes was elected a fellow of the Royal Society in 1863. Crookes wrote a standard treatise on Select Methods in Chemical Analysis in 1871.

In 1866, Adolf Erik Nordenskiöld identified a rare mineral from Skrikerum as a selenide of copper, thallium, and silver (Cu_{7}(Tl, Ag)Se_{4}), and named the mineral crookesite in honor of Sir William Crookes.

Crookes developed the Crookes tube, investigating cathode rays. He published numerous papers on spectroscopy and conducted research on a variety of minor subjects. In his investigations of the conduction of electricity in low pressure gases, he discovered that as the pressure was lowered, the negative electrode (cathode) appeared to emit rays (the so-called "cathode rays", now known to be a stream of free electrons, and used in cathode-ray display devices). As these examples indicate, he was a pioneer in the construction and use of vacuum tubes for the study of physical phenomena. He was, as a consequence, one of the first scientists to investigate what is now called a plasma and identified it as the fourth state of matter in 1879. He also devised one of the first instruments for studying nuclear radioactivity, the spinthariscope.

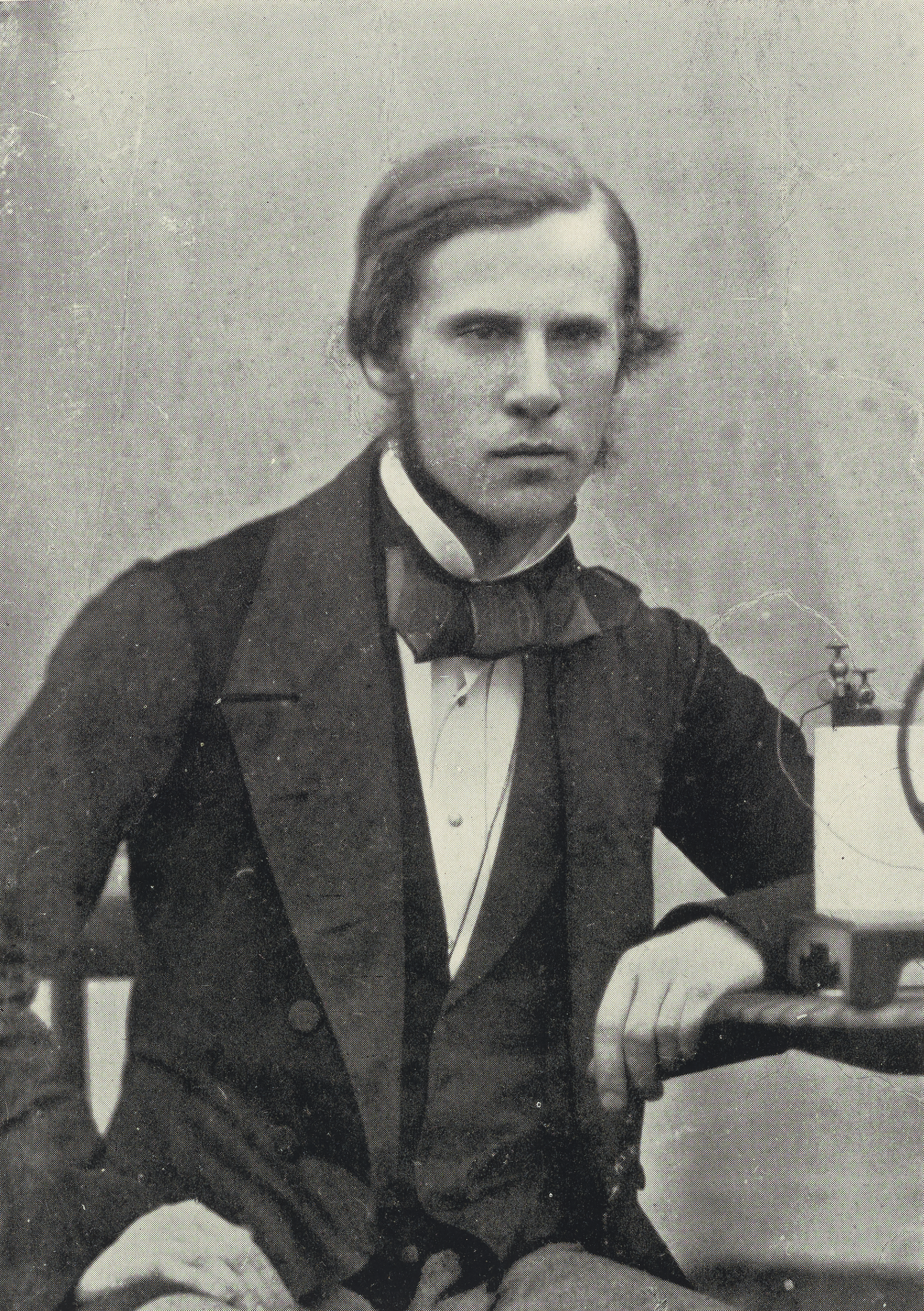
Portrait of William Crookes, age 18

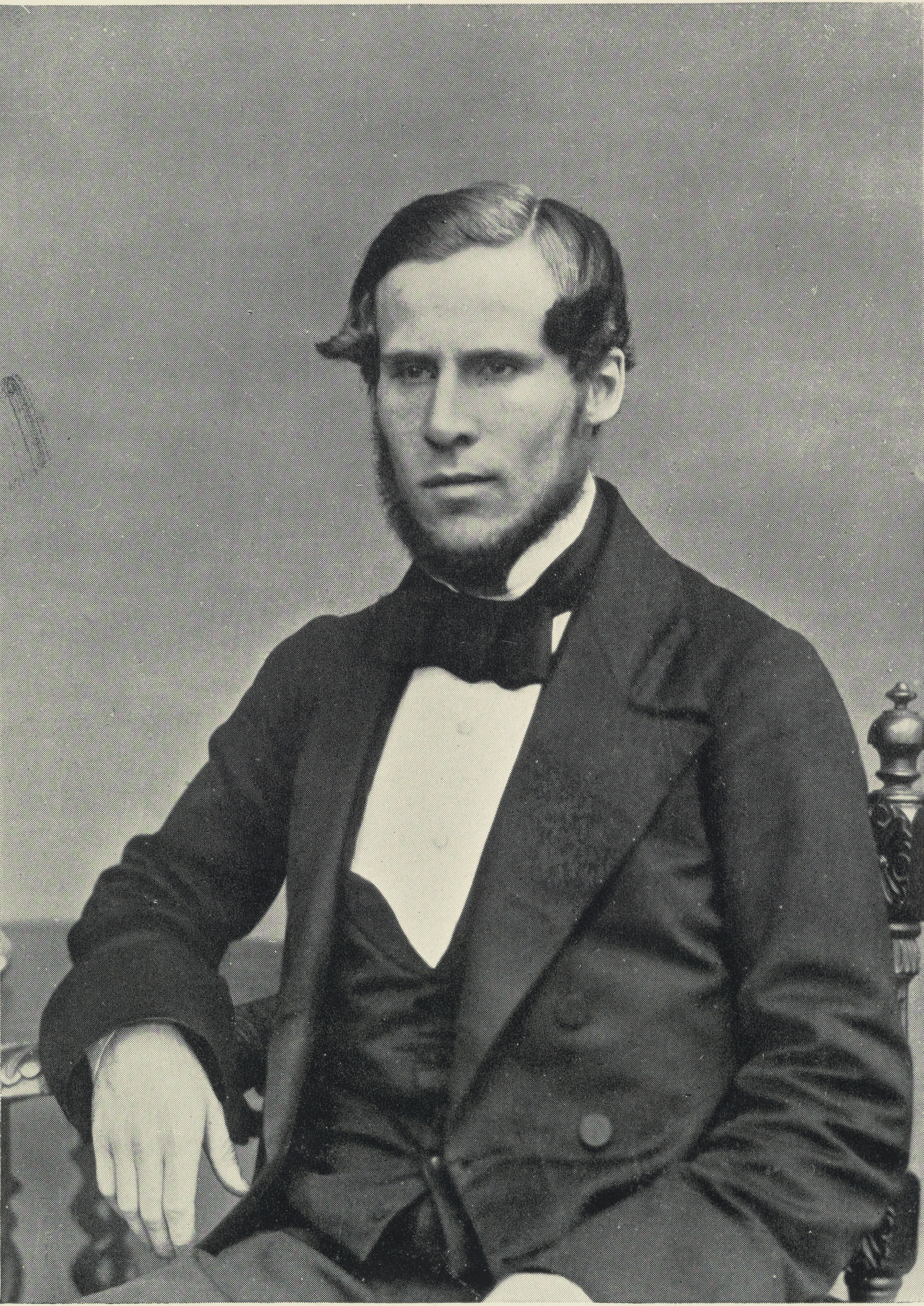
Portrait of William Crookes, age 24

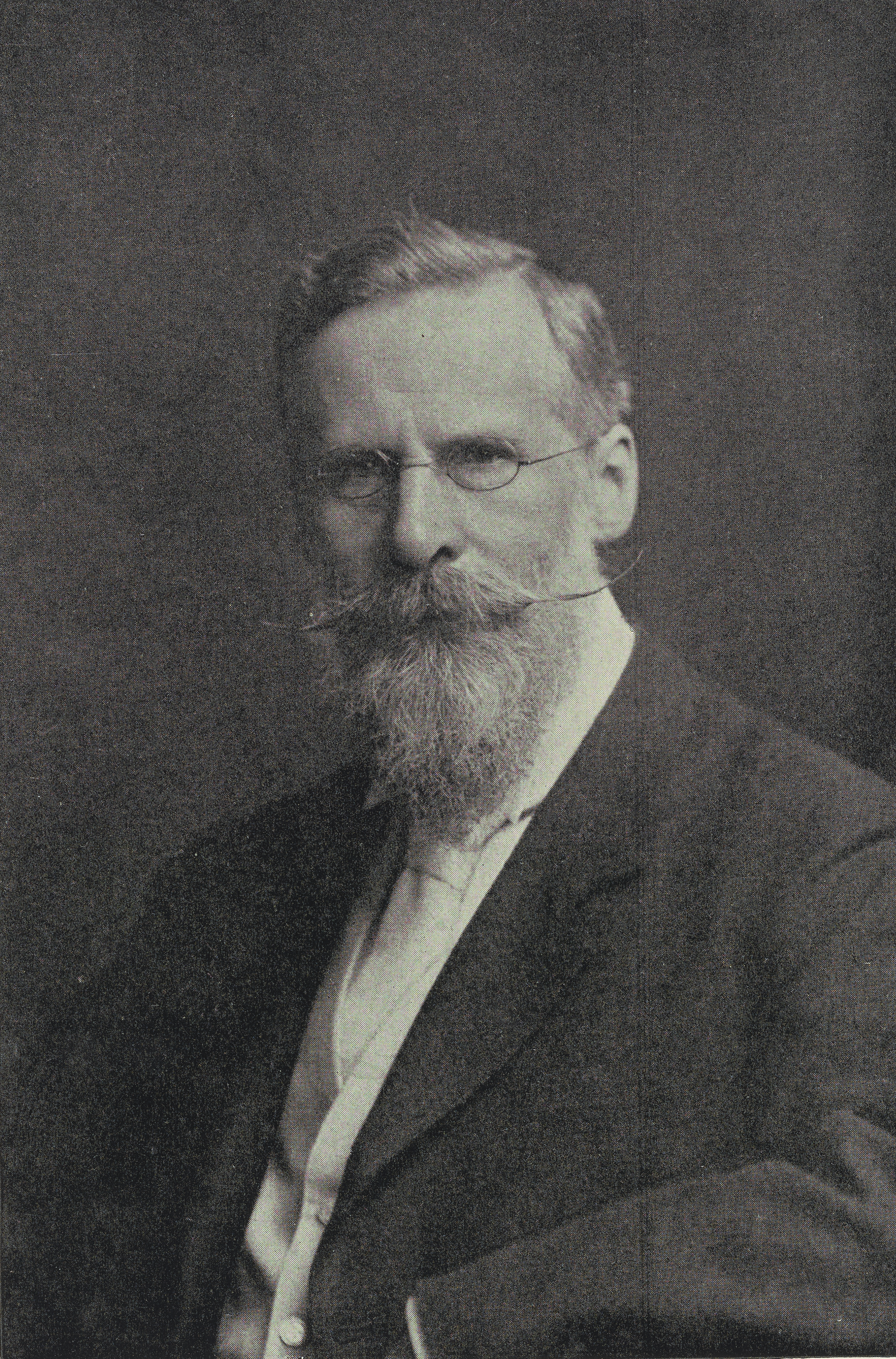
Portrait of William Crookes, age 57

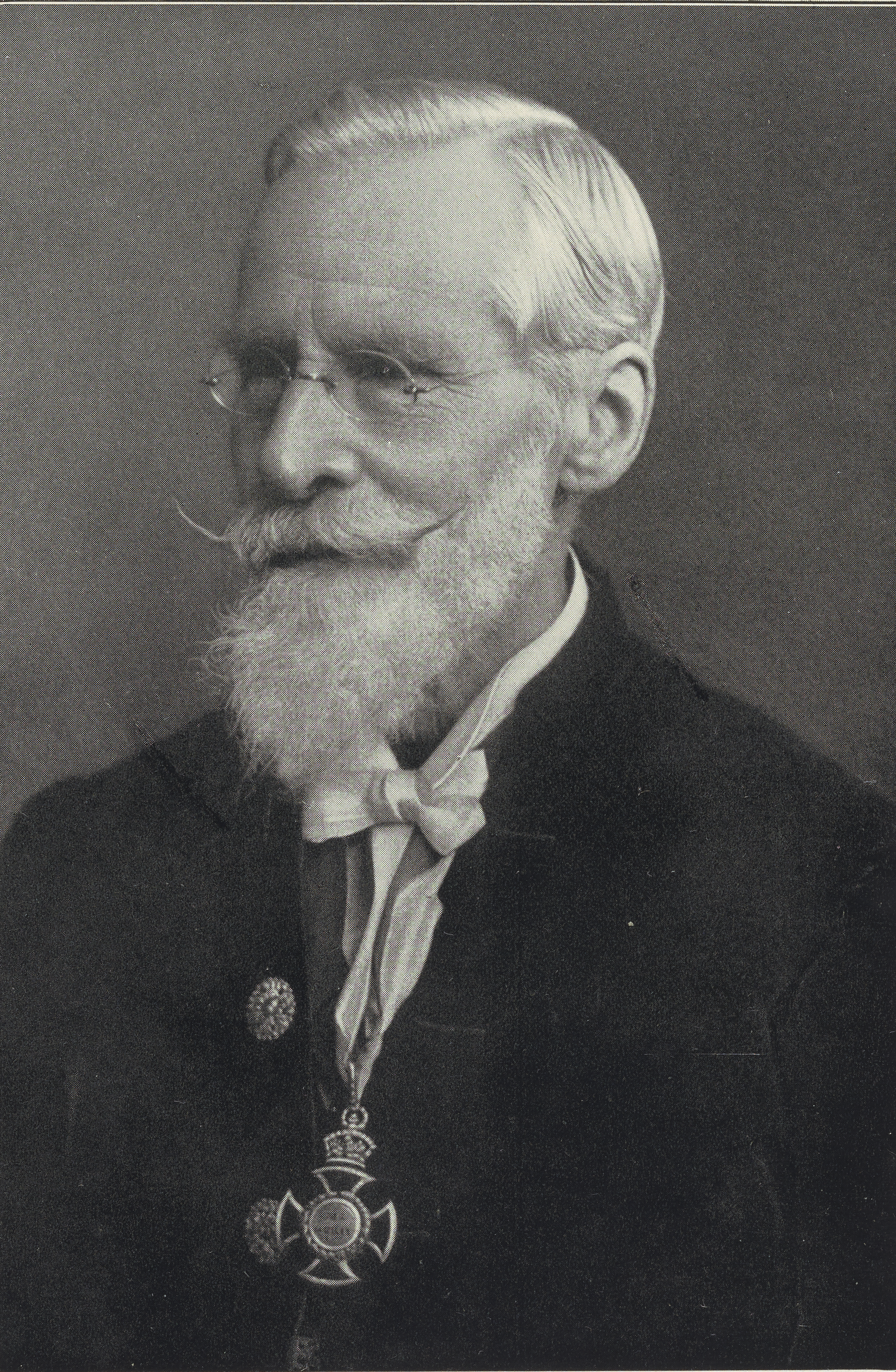
Portrait of Sir William Crookes, O.M., age 79

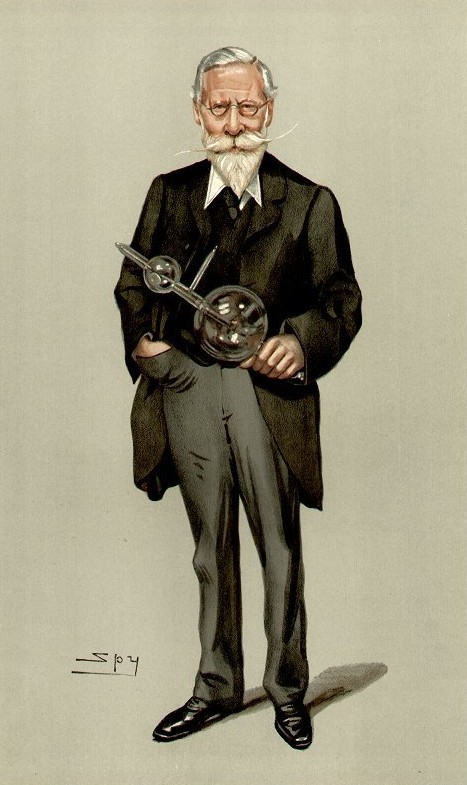
Sir William Crookes by Sir Leslie Ward, 1902

Crookes investigated the properties of cathode rays, showing that they travel in straight lines, cause fluorescence when they fall on some substances, and that their impact can produce great heat. He believed that he had discovered a fourth state of matter, which he called "radiant matter", but his theoretical views on the nature of "radiant matter" were to be superseded. He believed the rays to consist of streams of particles of ordinary molecular magnitude. It remained for Sir J. J. Thomson to expound on the subatomic nature of cathode rays (consisting of streams of negative electrons). Nevertheless, Crookes's experimental work in this field was the foundation of discoveries which eventually changed the whole of chemistry and physics.

Crookes's attention had been attracted to the vacuum balance in the course of his research into thallium. He soon discovered the phenomenon which drives the movement in a Crookes radiometer, in which a set of vanes, each blackened on one side and polished on the other, rotate when exposed to radiant energy. Crookes did not, however, provide the true explanation of this apparent "attraction and repulsion resulting from radiation".

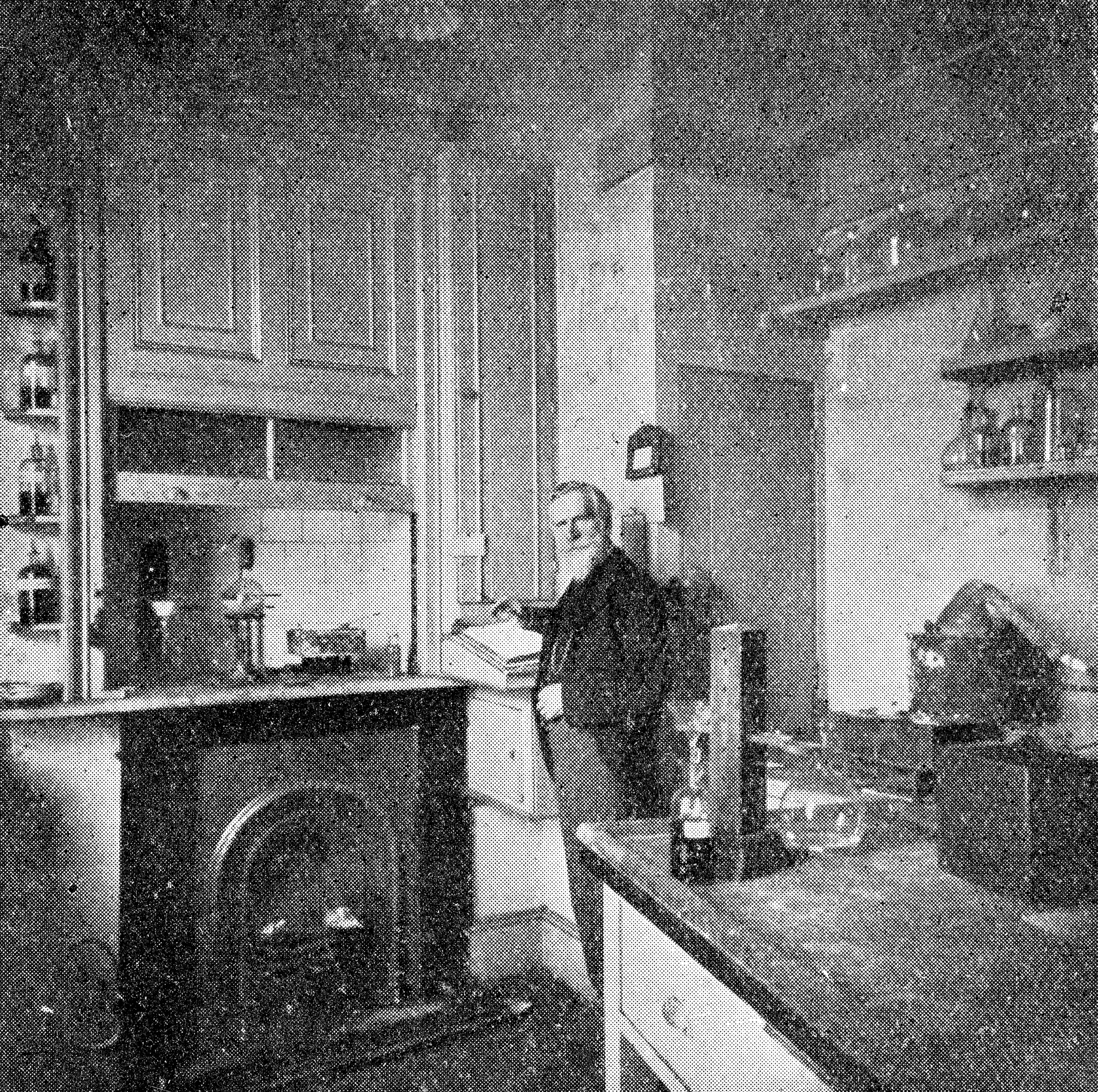
Sir William Crookes in his laboratory

After 1880, Crookes lived at 7 Kensington Park Gardens in the fashionable area of Notting Hill. His household included a large multigenerational family and a number of servants. There all his later work was done, in what was then "the finest private laboratory in Britain". It comprised an entire floor of the house and included three interconnected laboratory rooms, for chemistry, physics, and mechanical construction, and a library. Crookes was able to purchase the house and build the laboratory because of his income from the National Guano Company and from various patents.

By 1880 Crookes employed a paid full-time scientific assistant (first Charles Gimingham and after 1883 James Gardiner). He was also helped by his daughter Alice, who was "adept at fractionating rare earth elements" and "no mean interpreter of spectra".

His daily routine was to manage his commercial affairs in the morning, do further business or go to scientific meetings in the afternoon, eat dinner at 7, work in his library from 8 to 9, and then in the laboratory until after midnight. From his home, Crookes could easily reach the Chemical News offices, the Royal Society, the Chemica Society, and the Athenaeum Club.

On 16 January 1884, Crookes's father died. Crookes's daughter Florence died of scarlet fever in the same week. Joseph Crookes's estate was left in trust, divided between his three surviving sons, Alfred, William and Frank. Combined with his previous income, this ensured that Crookes was very well off.

In 1886, Crookes was elected as a member to the American Philosophical Society.

=== Later years ===
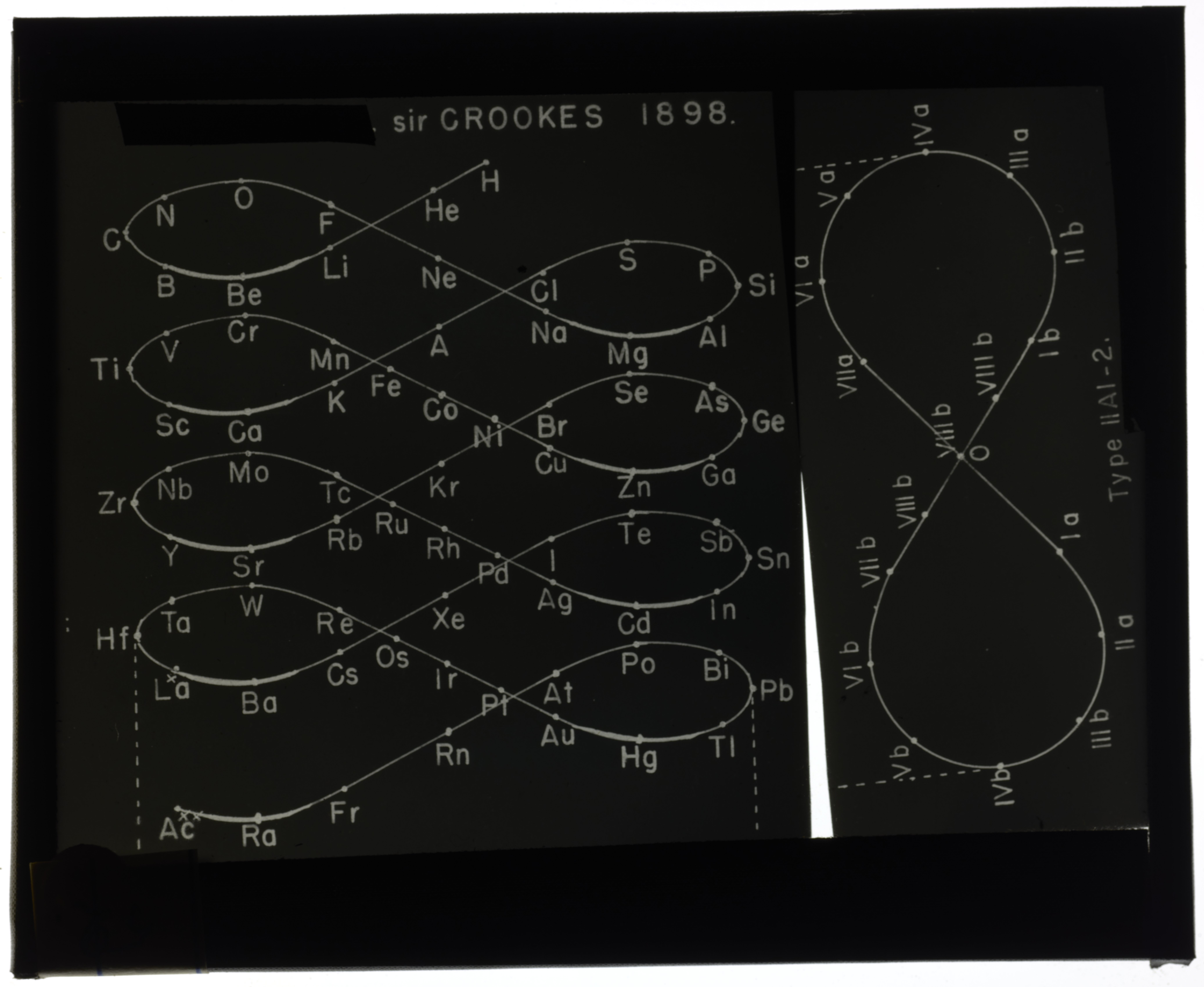
Sample illustration: Periodic table in the style of a space lemniscate by William Crookes

On 13 August 1894, John William Strutt, 3rd Baron Rayleigh and William Ramsay announced the detection of a new gas in the atmosphere. On 31 January 1895 they made a full report to the Royal Society on the new gas, argon. In addition, William Crookes, who had been asked to examine a sample, presented on the spectra of argon, reported that argon displayed two distinct spectra. A few month later Ramsay isolated helium from the mineral cleveite. Crookes confirmed the identify of the gas helium establishing its correspondence with the earlier observations of Janssen and Lockyer of solar helium. The discovery of argon and of helium led to identification of the noble gases and the extension of the periodic system to include an additional column. Crookes himself suggested a design for a Periodic table in the style of a space lemniscate in 1898. Crookes was knighted in 1897.

Crookes was named president of the British Association for the Advancement of Science in 1898. In his inaugural address, he outlined in detail a coming catastrophe: The wheat-eating peoples of the world were going to start running out of food in the 1930s. The reason, he said, was a dearth of nitrogen fertilizer available from natural sources. Crookes called on chemists to develop new ways of making fertilizer from the enormous stock of nitrogen in the atmosphere (which is roughly 80 percent nitrogen). His remarks on the coming famine achieved wide distribution in the press and were turned into a popular book. Scientists addressing the problem in the first years of the twentieth century included Kristian Birkeland, whose technology helped found Norsk Hydro, and Fritz Haber and Carl Bosch, whose Haber–Bosch process forms the foundation of today's nitrogen fertilizer industry.

In 1903, Crookes turned his attention to the newly discovered phenomenon of radioactivity, achieving the separation from uranium of its active transformation product, uranium-X (later established to be protactinium). Crookes observed the gradual decay of the separated transformation product, and the simultaneous reproduction of a fresh supply in the original uranium. At about the same time as this important discovery, he observed that when "p-particles", ejected from radio-active substances, impinge upon zinc sulfide, each impact is accompanied by a minute scintillation, an observation which forms the basis of one of the most useful methods in the detection of radioactivity.

In 1913, Crookes created an ultraviolet blocking lens made from glass containing cerium, but only lightly tinted. These inventions were the by-product of Crookes's research to find a lens glass formulation that would protect glass workers from cataracts. Crookes tested more than 300 formulations, each numbered and labelled. Crookes Glass 246 was the tint recommended for glassworkers. The best-known Crookes tints are A (withdrawn due to its uranium), A1, B, and B2, which absorb all ultraviolet below 350 nm while darkening visual light. Crookes's initial samples were made by Whitefriars, London, stained glass makers and Chance Brothers, Birmingham. A partnership with Sir William Wingate and his Son Frank Melson Wingate - under Melson Wingate Ltd improved the samples for commercial use.

Crookes died in 1919 at the age of 86. Crookes crater on the far side of the Moon was named after him in 1970.

== Spiritualism ==
Crookes became interested in spiritualism in the late 1860s, and was most strongly involved around 1874–1875. Eric Deeson notes that Crookes's studies of the occult are related to his scientific work on radiometry in that both involved the detection of previously undiscovered forces.

Crookes was possibly influenced by the death of his younger brother Philip in 1867 at 21 from yellow fever contracted while he was on an expedition to lay a telegraph cable from Cuba to Florida. In 1867, influenced by Cromwell Fleetwood Varley, Crookes attended a séance to try to get in touch with his brother.

Between 1871 and 1874, Crookes studied the mediums Kate Fox, Florence Cook, and Daniel Dunglas Home. After his investigation, he believed that the mediums could produce genuine paranormal phenomena and communicate with spirits. Psychologists Leonard Zusne and Warren H. Jones have described Crookes as gullible as he endorsed fraudulent mediums as genuine.

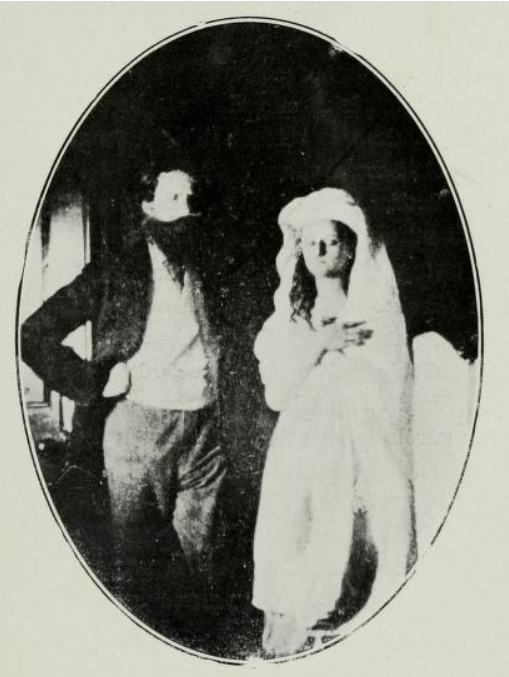
Crookes with Katie King

The anthropologist Edward Clodd noted that Crookes had poor eyesight, which may have explained his belief in spiritualist phenomena and quoted William Ramsay as saying that Crookes is "so shortsighted that, despite his unquestioned honesty, he cannot be trusted in what he tells you he has seen." Biographer William Hodson Brock wrote that Crookes was "evidently short-sighted, but did not wear spectacles until the 1890s. Until then he may have used a monocle or pocket magnifying glass when necessary. What limitations this imposed upon his psychic investigations we can only imagine."

After studying the reports of Florence Cook, the science historian Sherrie Lynne Lyons wrote that the alleged spirit "Katie King" was at times Cook herself and at other times an accomplice. Regarding Crookes, Lyons wrote, "Here was a man with a flawless scientific reputation, who discovered a new element, but could not detect a real live maiden who was masquerading as a ghost". Cook was repeatedly exposed as a fraudulent medium but she had been "trained in the arts of the séance" which managed to trick Crookes. Some researchers such as Trevor H. Hall suspected that Crookes had an affair with Cook.

In a series of experiments in London, England at the house of Crookes in February 1875, the medium Anna Eva Fay managed to fool Crookes into believing she had genuine psychic powers. Fay later confessed to her fraud and revealed the tricks that she had used. Regarding Crookes and his experiments with mediums, the magician Harry Houdini suggested that Crookes had been deceived. The physicist Victor Stenger wrote that the experiments were poorly controlled and "his desire to believe blinded him to the chicanery of his psychic subjects."

In 1897, John Grier Hibben wrote that Crookes's idea of ether waves explaining telepathy was not a scientific hypothesis "he presents no facts to indicate its probability or to save it from being relegated to the sphere of bare conjecture."

In 1916, William Hope tricked Crookes with a fake spirit photograph of his wife. Oliver Lodge revealed there had been obvious signs of double exposure, the picture of Lady Crookes had been copied from a wedding anniversary photograph, but Crookes was a convinced spiritualist and claimed it was genuine evidence for spirit photography.

The physiologist Gordon Stein suspected that Crookes was too ashamed to admit he had been duped by the medium Florence Cook or that he conspired with her for sexual favors. He also suggested that Crookes had conspired with Anna Eva Fay. He noted that contrary to popular belief, Hope had been exposed as a fraud on several occasions. Stein concluded that all feats of Hope were conjuring tricks. In a review, biographer William Brock wrote that Stein made his "case against Crookes and Hope clearly and logically."

Crookes joined the Society for Psychical Research, becoming its president in the 1890s: he also joined the Theosophical Society and The Ghost Club, of which he was president from 1907 to 1912. In 1890 he was initiated into the Hermetic Order of the Golden Dawn.

== See also ==
- List of presidents of the Royal Society

Professional and academic associations
Preceded by Archibald Geikie	41st President of the Royal Society; 1913–1915	Succeeded by J. J. Thomson
