= Mikhail Petrovo-Solovovo =

Russian diplomat, psychical researcher and skeptic. (1868–1954)

Perovsky-Petrovo-Solovovo
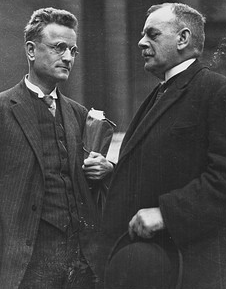
- Perovsky-Petrovo-Solovovo (right) with psychical researcher Rudolf Lambert
- Occupation: Psychical researcher

Count Mikhail Mikhailovich Perovsky-Petrovo-Solovovo (граф Михаил Михайлович Перовский-Петрово-Соловово; 1868–1954) was a Russian diplomat, psychical researcher and skeptic.

== Career ==
Mikhail Petrovo-Solovovo, a scion of an ancient aristocratic family that owned a Neoclassical palace on Nevsky Avenue, inherited the comital title from his maternal grandfather, General Boris Perovsky, in 1907. He held the rank of chamberlain at the imperial court and, for some time, was the first secretary of the Foreign Ministry of the Russian Empire.

Solovovo joined the Society for Psychical Research (SPR) in 1890. He published several controversial papers in the SPR Journal arguing that many spiritualist mediums had been caught in fraud. In 1936 he moved to London.

In 1904–1905, Solovovo translated Frank Podmore's Modern Spiritualism (two volumes) into Russian with a new supplement that included an exposure of the fraudulent medium Jan Guzyk. In December 1910, Solovovo attended séance sittings with Everard Feilding and the magician William Marriott to test the medium Eusapia Palladino. The results were negative and the conclusion was that the phenomena was entirely fraudulent.

In 1912, Solovovo described a letter written by Dr. Barthez, a physician in the court of Empress Eugenie, which claimed the medium Daniel Dunglas Home was caught using his foot to fake supposed spirit effects during a séance in Biarritz in 1857. The letter proved controversial within the parapsychology community and has become a source of debate between Home's defenders and skeptics.

Solovovo attended many séances with the Russian medium Stephan Fomitch Sambor (S. F. Sambor). On one occasion a chair was found hanging from the mediums arm even though his hand was allegedly held by a séance sitter. Solovovo later discovered that this sitter had intentionally released Sambor's hand and was likely to have worked as an accomplice for the medium on other occasions.

== Selected publications ==
Books

- The Scientific Investigation of Physical Phenomena with Mediums (In Russian, St. Petersburg, 1900)

Papers

- Perovsky-Petrovo-Solovovo, Count. (1883). Journal of the Society for Psychical Research. On the Production of Spurious "Spirit Raps"]. Journal of the Society for Psychical Research 6: 120–122.
- Perovsky-Petrovo-Solovovo, Count. (1908). The Slate-Writing of Mrs. Francis. Journal of the Society for Psychical Research 13: 293–295.
- Perovsky-Petrovo-Solovovo, Count. (1909). The Hallucination Theory as Applied to Certain Cases of Physical Phenomena. Proceedings of the Society for Psychical Research 21: 436–482.
- Perovsky-Petrovo-Solovovo, Count. (1912). On the Alleged Exposure of D. D. Home in France. Journal of the Society for Psychical Research 15: 274–288.
- Perovsky-Petrovo-Solovovo, Count. (1922). Concerning D. D. Home. Proceedings of the Society for Psychical Research 32: 18.
- Perovsky-Petrovo-Solovovo, Count. (1927. Concerning Lord Dunraven's Sittings with D. D. Home. Journal of Society for Psychical Research 24: 88–89.
- Perovsky-Petrovo-Solovovo, Count. (1927). Note on an Early Exposure of Guzik. Journal of the Society for Psychical Research 24: 368–370.
- Perovsky-Petrovo-Solovovo, Count. (1928). Note on the Günther-Geffers Case. Journal of the Society for Psychical Research 24: 306–307.
- Perovsky-Petrovo-Solovovo, Count. (1930). Some Thoughts on D. D. Home. Proceedings of the Society for Psychical Research 39: 247–265.
- Perovsky-Petrovo-Solovovo, Count. (1937). My Experiments with S. F. Sambor. Journal of the Society for Psychical Research 30: 87–90.
- Perovsky-Petrovo-Solovovo, Count. (1939–1940). Incidents of Bygone Days. Journal of the Society for Psychical Research 31: 79–81.
- Perovsky-Petrovo-Solovovo, Count. (1942–1945). Nikolaeff: A Little-Known Russian Physical Medium. Proceedings of the Society for Psychical Research 47: 261–266.
