= Carlos María de Heredia =

Mexican Jesuit (1872–1951)

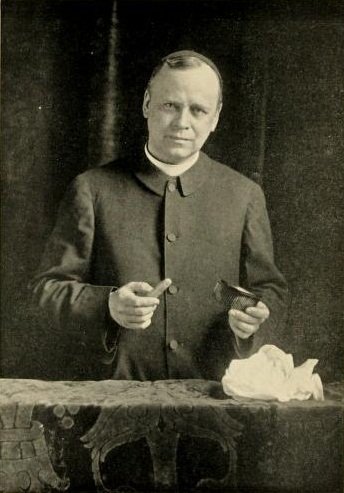
Carlos María de Heredia

Carlos María de Heredia (1872-1951) was a Mexican magician and Jesuit priest. He was a leading Catholic critic of spiritism.

== Biography ==
Heredia was born in Mexico City and spent his life investigating and exposing the tricks of spiritism. He worked as a professor at the College of the Holy Cross. At the Catholic Club of New York in 1920, he held a mock séance for five hundred people. He showed the audience how easily one could fake mediumship tricks such as the levitation of objects and how easily people can be fooled in the séance room. Heredia had revealed how the fake ectoplasm "spirit hand" was made by using a rubber glove, paraffin and a jar of cold water. The work of Heredia in debunking the tricks of fraudulent mediums has been praised by the skeptic Daniel Loxton.

His book Spiritism and Common Sense (1922) has been described as a "highly critical examination of paranormal phenomena."

Heredia was a friend with the magicians Harry Houdini and John Mulholland. In his Magician Among the Spirits (1924), Houdini cited a fraudulent method that Heredia had used to produce a spirit photograph.

== Publications ==
- Spiritism and Common Sense. New York: P.J. Kenedy & Sons. 1922. OCLC 421406262.
- True Spiritualism (1924)
- Los Fraudes Espiritistas y los Fenómenos Metapsíquicos (1931)
- The Quest of Ben Hered: Memoirs of a Reporter in the Time of Christ (1947)
