= Saducismus Triumphatus =

Book by Joseph Glanvill

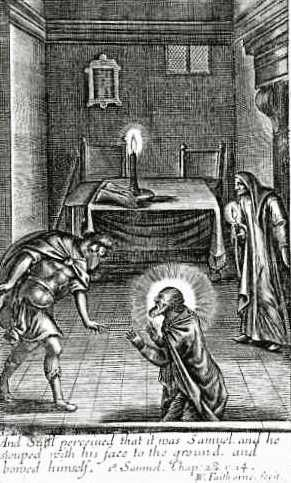
The frontispiece to Saducismus Triumphatus, depicting Saul consulting the Witch of Endor

Saducismus triumphatus is a book on witchcraft by Joseph Glanvill, published posthumously in England in 1681.

The editor is presumed to have been Henry More, who certainly contributed to the volume; and topical material on witchcraft in Sweden was supplied by Anthony Horneck to later editions. By 1683 this appeared as a lengthy appendix. Horneck's contribution came from a Dutch pamphlet of 1670. Its composition is mentioned in the chapter on Transportation by an invisible power in the Miscellanies of John Aubrey.

The book affirmed the existence of witches with malign supernatural powers of magic, and attacked skepticism concerning their abilities. Glanvill likened these skeptics to the Sadducees, members of a Jewish sect from around the time of Jesus who were said to have denied the immortality of the soul. The book is also noted for the account of the Drummer of Tedworth, an early poltergeist story, and for one of the earliest descriptions of the use of a witch bottle, a countercharm against witchcraft.

== Influence ==
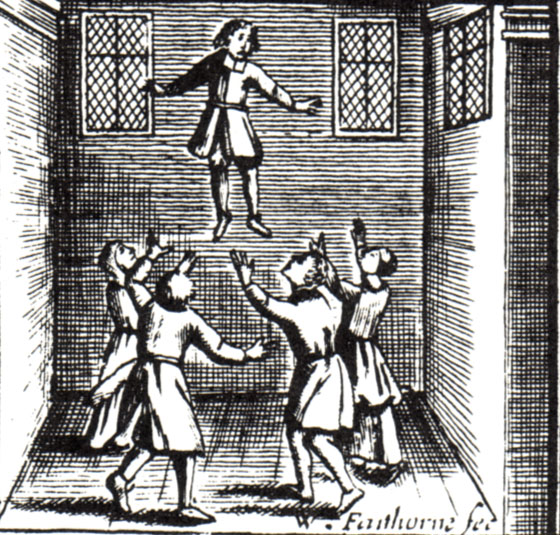
Illustration on child levitation

The book strongly influenced Cotton Mather in his Discourse on Witchcraft (1689) and the Salem witch trials held in 1692–3 in Salem, Massachusetts. Mather's Wonders of the Invisible World (1693) is largely modelled after this book and its reports, particularly the material relating to the Mora witch trial of 1669. Shirley Jackson quoted passages from the book in her short story collection The Lottery and Other Stories.

== In popular culture ==
The book is mentioned in H. P. Lovecraft's short story "The Festival":

"Pointing to a chair, table, and pile of books, the old man now left the room; and when I sat down to read I saw that the books were hoary and mouldy, and that they included old Morryster's wild Marvells of Science, the terrible Saducismus Triumphatus of Joseph Glanvill, published in 1681, the shocking Daemonolatreia of Remigius, printed in 1595 at Lyons, and worst of all, the unmentionable Necronomicon of the mad Arab Abdul Alhazred, in Olaus Wormius' forbidden Latin translation; a book which I had never seen, but of which I had heard monstrous things whispered."

The book was also seen in season 1 episode 2 "The Stone Child", of the WGN America television series Salem, when Cotton Mather (Seth Gabel) consults the book while he is talking to John Alden (Shane West) about him witnessing a Witches' Sabbath.

== See also ==
- Blockula
- Malleus Maleficarum
- Formicarius
- Domen, Norway
- Brocken
