= Joseph Glanvill =

English philosopher and clergyman (1636–1680)

Joseph Glanvill FRS
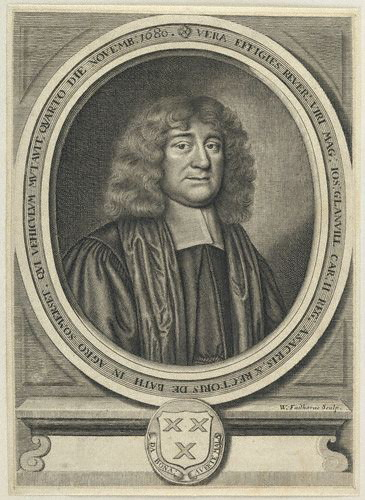
- Engraving by William Faithorne, 1681
- Born: 1636; Plymouth, England
- Died: 4 November 1680 (aged 43–44); Bath, Somerset, England
- Education: Exeter College, Oxford (B.A.); Lincoln College, Oxford (M.A.)

Joseph Glanvill (1636 – 4 November 1680) was an English writer, philosopher, and clergyman. Not himself a scientist, he has been called "the most skillful apologist of the virtuosi", or in other words the leading propagandist for the approach of the English natural philosophers of the later 17th century. In 1661 he predicted "To converse at the distance of the Indes by means of sympathetic conveyances may be as natural to future times as to us is a literary correspondence."

== Life ==
Born in 1636 at Plymouth, he was raised in a strict Puritan household, and educated at Oxford University, where he graduated B.A. from Exeter College in 1655, M.A. from Lincoln College in 1658.

Glanvill was made vicar of Frome in 1662, and was a Fellow of the Royal Society in 1664. He was rector of the Abbey Church at Bath from 1666 to 1680, and prebendary of Worcester in 1678. He died of fever on 4 November 1680 at Bath.

== Works and views ==
He was a Latitudinarian thinker. Latitudinarians generally respected the Cambridge Platonists, and Glanvill was friendly with and much influenced by Henry More, a leader in that group where Glanvill was a follower. It was Glanvill's style to seek out a "middle way" on contemporary philosophical issues. His writings display a variety of beliefs that may appear contradictory. There is discussion of Glanvill's thought and method in Basil Willey's Seventeenth Century Background (1934).

=== Rationality and plain talking ===
He was the author of The Vanity of Dogmatizing (editions from 1661), which attacked scholasticism and religious persecution. It was a plea for religious toleration, the scientific method, and freedom of thought. It also contained a tale that became the material for Matthew Arnold's Victorian poem The Scholar Gipsy.

Glanvill was at first a Cartesian, but shifted his ground a little, engaging with scepticism and proposing a modification in Scepsis Scientifica (1665), a revision and expansion of The Vanity of Dogmatizing. It started with an explicit "Address to the Royal Society"; the Society responded by electing him as Fellow. He continued in a role of spokesman for his type of limited sceptical approach, and the Society's production of useful knowledge. As part of his programme, he argued for a plain use of language, undistorted as to definitions and reliance on metaphor. He also advocated with Essay Concerning Preaching (1678) simple speech, rather than bluntness, in preaching, as Robert South did, with hits at nonconformist sermons; he was quite aware that the term "plain" takes a great deal of unpacking.

In Essays on Several Important Subjects in Philosophy and Religion (1676) he wrote a significant essay The Agreement of Reason and Religion, aimed at least in part at nonconformism. Reason, in Glanvill's view, was incompatible with being a dissenter. In Antifanatickal Religion and Free Philosophy, another essay from the volume, he attacked the whole tradition of imaginative illumination in religion, going back to William Perkins, as founded on the denigration of reason. This essay has the subtitle Continuation of the New Atlantis, and so connects with Francis Bacon's utopia. In an allegory, Glanvill placed the "Young Academicians", standing for the Cambridge Platonists, in the midst of intellectual troubles matching the religious upheavals seen in Britain. They coped by combining modern with ancient thought. Glanvill thought, however, that the world cannot be deduced from reason alone. Even the supernatural cannot be solved from first principles and must be investigated empirically. As a result, Glanvill attempted to investigate supposed supernatural incidents through interviews and examination of the scene of the events.

=== The supernatural ===
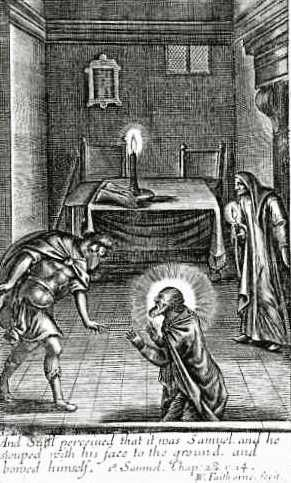
The Witch of Endor: from the frontispiece to Glanvill's Saducismus Triumphatus

He is known also for Saducismus Triumphatus (1681), an enlargement of his Blow at Modern Sadducism (1668), which was published after Glanvill's death by Henry More. The work decried scepticism about the existence and supernatural power of witchcraft and contained a collection of seventeenth-century folklore about witches, including one of the earliest descriptions of a witch bottle. It developed as a compendium (with multiple authorship) from Philosophical Considerations Touching the Being of Witches and Witchcraft (1666), addressed to Robert Hunt, a Justice of the Peace active from the 1650s against witches in Somerset (where Glanvill had his living at Frome); the 1668 version A Blow at Modern Sadducism promoted the view that the judicial procedures such as Hunt's court offered should be taken as adequate tests of evidence, because to argue otherwise was to undermine society at its legal roots. His biographer Ferris Greenslet attributed Glanvill's interest in the topic to a house party in February 1665 at Ragley Hall, home of Lady Anne Conway, where other guests were More, Francis van Helmont, and Valentine Greatrakes. In the matter of the Drummer of Tedworth, a report of poltergeist-type activity from 1662 to 1663, More and Glanvill had in fact already corresponded about it in 1663.

Saducismus Triumphatus deeply influenced Cotton Mather's Wonders of the Invisible World (1693), written to justify the Salem witch trials in the following year. It was also taken as a target when Francis Hutchinson set down An Historical Essay Concerning Witchcraft (1718); both books made much of reports from Sweden, and included by Glanvill as editor, which had experienced a moral panic about witchcraft after 1668.

Jonathan Israel writes:

In England men such as Boyle, Henry More, Ralph Cudworth and Joseph Glanvill battled to stabilize belief in the existence and operations of apparitions and spirits as part of a wider drive to uphold religion, authority and tradition.

These and others (Richard Baxter, Meric Casaubon, George Sinclair) believed that the tide of scepticism on witchcraft, setting in strongly by about 1670, could be turned back by research and sifting of the evidence. Like More, Glanvill believed that the existence of spirits was well documented in the Bible, and that the denial of spirits and demons was the first step towards atheism. Atheism led to rebellion and social chaos and therefore had to be overcome by science and the activities of the learned. Israel cites a letter from More to Glanvill, from 1678 and included in Saducismus Triumphatus, in which he says that followers of Thomas Hobbes and Baruch Spinoza use scepticism about "spirits and angels" to undermine belief in the Scripture mentioning them.

Saducismus Triumphatus was also translated into German in 1701. The German edition was used extensively by Peter Goldschmidt in his similar work Verworffener Hexen- und Zauberer-Advocat (1705). This work brought the Saducismus Triumphatus to the attention of Christian Thomasius, a philosopher, legal professor and sceptic in Halle. Over the next 21 years, Thomasius published translations of works by English sceptics: John Webster and Francis Hutchinson, as well as John Beaumont's An Historical, Physiological and Theological Treatise of Spirits, all of which were accompanied by vitriolic prefaces attacking Glanvill, Goldschmidt and their belief in witchcraft.

=== Atheism, scepticism and Aristotle ===
His views did not prevent Glanvill himself being charged with atheism. This happened after he engaged in a controversy with Robert Crosse, over the continuing value of the work of Aristotle, the classical exponent of the middle way. In defending himself and the Royal Society, in Plus ultra, he attacked current teaching of medicine (physick), and in return was attacked by Henry Stubbe, in The Plus Ultra reduced to a Non Plus (1670). His views on Aristotle also led to an attack by Thomas White, the Catholic priest known as Blacklo. In A Praefatory Answer to Mr. Henry Stubbe (1671) he defined the "philosophy of the virtuosi" cleanly: the "plain objects of sense" to be respected, as the locus of as much certainty as was available; the "suspension of assent" absent adequate proof; and the claim for the approach as "equally an adversary to scepticism and credulity". To White he denied being a sceptic. A contemporary view is that his approach was a species of rational fideism.

His Philosophia Pia (1671) was explicitly about the connection between the "experimental philosophy" of the Royal Society and religion. It was a reply to a letter of Meric Casaubon, one of the Society's critics, to Peter du Moulin. He used it to cast doubt on the roots of enthusiasm, one of his main targets amongst the nonconformists. It also dealt with criticisms of Richard Baxter, who was another accusing the Society of an atheist tendency.
