= Ruth Brandon =

British journalist, historian and author

Ruth Brandon (born 1943) is a British journalist, historian and author.

== Early life ==
Brandon was born in Luton, where her family had a factory, grew up in Edgware. Her grandparents were Jewish refugees from Russia. Brandon attended North London Collegiate School. She studied English and French at Girton College, Cambridge and then a women's college.

== Career ==
Brandon began her career as a trainee producer for the BBC, working in radio and television. She moved to work in freelance journalism and as an author. She is the author of many works of both fiction and non-fiction.

Brandon's popular book The Spiritualists: The Passion for the Occult in the Nineteenth and Twentieth Centuries (1983) was republished by Prometheus Books. The book has been an influence on skeptics as it debunked spiritualism by documenting the absurdity and fraud in mediumship. Martin Gardner wrote "Thousands of books about spiritualism have been written by believers, skeptics, and fence-sitters, but none demonstrates as convincingly as The Spiritualists the unbelievable ease with which persons of the highest intelligence can be flimflammed by the crudest of psychic frauds."

In the early 1980s Brandon was involved in a dispute with the paranormal author Brian Inglis over the mediumship of Daniel Dunglas Home in the New Scientist magazine.

Brandon lives in London with her husband Philip Steadman, an art historian. Their daughter, Lily, was born 1982.

== Publications ==
Fiction

- Caravaggio's Angel (2011)
- The Uncertainty Principle (1996)
- Tickling the Dragon (1995)
- The Gorgon's Smile (1992)
- Mind Out (1991)
- Left, Right and Centre (1991)
- Out of Body, Out of Mind (1987)

Non Fiction

- Ugly Beauty: Helena Rubinstein, L’Oreal and the Blemished History of Looking Good (2011)
- The dollar princesses: Sagas of upward nobility, 1870–1914 (2010)
- Other People's Daughters: The Life And Times Of The Governess (2008)
- People’s Chef: Alexis Soyer, a Life in Seven Courses (2004)
- The Life and Many Deaths of Harry Houdini (2003)
- Automobile: How the Car Changed Life (2002)
- Surreal Lives: The Surrealists 1917–1945 (2000)
- The New Women and the Old Men: Love, Sex and the Woman Question (2000)
- Being Divine: Biography of Sarah Bernhardt (1991)
- The Burning Question: The Anti-nuclear Movement Since 1945 (1987)
- The Spiritualists: The Passion for the Occult in the Nineteenth and Twentieth Centuries (1983)
- A capitalist romance: Singer and the sewing machine (1977)
