= Robert Crosse (theologian) =

English Puritan theologian (1606–1683)

- Born: 1606
- Died: 1683 (aged 76–77)
- Education: Lincoln College, Oxford
- Occupation: English puritan theologian

Robert Crosse (1606–1683) was an English puritan theologian.

== Life ==
He was son of William Crosse of Dunster, Somerset. He entered Lincoln College, Oxford, in 1621, obtained a fellowship in 1627, graduated in arts, and in 1637 proceeded B.D. Siding with the presbyterians on the outbreak of the First English Civil War, he was nominated in 1643 one of the Westminster Assembly, and took the Solemn League and Covenant.

In 1648, submitting to the parliamentarian visitors, he was appointed by the committee for the reformation of the University of Oxford to succeed Dr. Robert Sanderson as Regius Professor of Divinity. He declined the post, however, and soon afterwards was instituted as vicar of Chew Magna in Somerset. At the Restoration he conformed, and as there was nobody to claim his living, he retained it till his death on 12 December 1683. Anthony à Wood says he was a noted philosopher and theologian, an able preacher, and well versed in the Church Fathers and scholastic philosophers.

He had a controversy with Joseph Glanvill, on the subject of Aristotelian philosophy. This became sharp when Crosse accused Glanvill, and the Royal Society of which he was a Fellow, of being "downright atheists", based on their experimental philosophy. Crosse then passed the baton to Henry Stubbe, who became a very persistent critic of the Society. A book which Crosse wrote against Glanvill was rejected by the licensers, but Glanvill, having obtained the contents of it, sent it in a letter to Dr. Nathaniel Ingelo, who had a hundred copies of it privately printed under the title of the Chew Gazette. Afterwards Crosse wrote ballads against Glanvill with the object of ridiculing him and the Royal Society.

== Works ==
He was the author of Logon alogia, seu Exercitatio Theologica de Insipientia Rationis humanae, Gratia Christi destitutae, in Rebus Fidei; in 1 Cor. ii. 14, Oxford, 1655, 4to.
