= Daniel Webster Hering =

American physicist and university dean

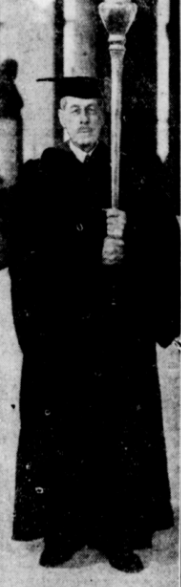
- Born: March 23, 1850; Washington County
- Died: March 24, 1938 (aged 88); Bellevue Hospital
- Education: Yale University
- Occupations: Physicist, university dean
- Organization(s): Johns Hopkins University; McDaniel College; University of Pittsburgh; New York University

Daniel Webster Hering (23 March 1850 – 24 March 1938) was an American physicist and university dean.

== Biography ==
Hering was born near Smithburg in Washington County, Maryland, and graduated from the Sheffield Scientific School (Yale) with a Ph.B. in 1872. He occupied positions at Johns Hopkins University, McDaniel College (then Western Maryland College), the University of Pittsburgh (then the Western University of Pennsylvania), and New York University, where he was dean after 1902. He was the author of Essentials of Physics for College Students (1912). Hering is credited with taking the first human x-ray in the United States on February 5, 1896, at Bellevue Hospital.

== Foibles and Fallacies of Science ==
Hering's work Foibles and Fallacies of Science (1924) is considered one of the key original texts on matters concerning pseudoscience. The book was positively reviewed in the Nature journal as containing much "curious and interesting information." The book covered alchemy, astrology, divination, prophecies, perpetual motion devices, hoaxes and quackery.

A review in the Journal of Pharmaceutical Sciences described it as a "serious study of pseudoscience" intended for the "layman in science and the professional student to whom we can highly recommend it."

Hering was one of the original citations for Martin Gardner in his work Fads and Fallacies in the Name of Science in which it is argued that he founded the modern scientific skepticism movement.

== Selected publications ==
- Essentials of Physics for College Students (1912, 1921)
- Physics: The Science of the Forces of Nature (1922)
- Foibles and Fallacies Of Science (1924)
