= Addington Bruce =

American journalist and writer

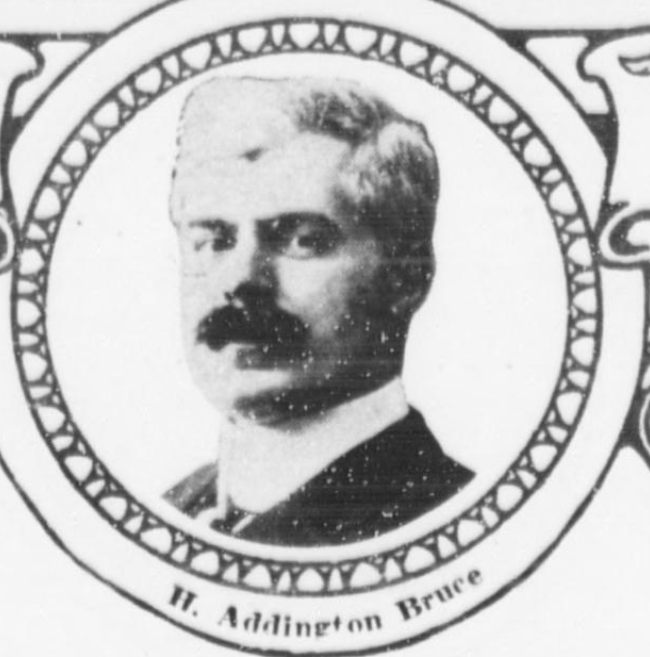
- Born: June 27, 1874
- Died: February 23, 1959 (aged 84)
- Occupations: Journalist, psychical researcher

Henry Addington Bayley Bruce (June 27, 1874 – February 23, 1959), best known as H. Addington Bruce, was an American journalist and author of psychology books.

== Career ==
Bruce was born in Toronto, Ontario, Canada, and educated at Upper Canada College and Trinity College, Toronto. He was for a time on the Toronto Week, then came to the United States, was employed by the American Press Association between 1897 and 1903, and afterward contributed to many periodicals, notably The Outlook. In 1916 he resigned as staff contributor to The Outlook. In 1915 he became psychological adviser to the Associated Newspapers. Addington Bruce also wrote books. His most successful work was in American history and in popularizing modern psychology and psychical research.

Bruce has been described as a publicist for psychology. His books were known to discuss the subconscious and power of suggestion. They were positively reviewed in the American Journal of Psychology and Journal of Abnormal Psychology. His Nerve Control and How to Gain It (1918) was described as a "reliable book which can be put into the hands of the nervously ill but intelligent patient."

Bruce who took interest in psychical research, was a believer in telepathy and Frederic W. H. Myers' concept of a subliminal self. He dedicated his book The Riddle Of Personality (1908) to William James. Philosopher William Pepperell Montague took issue with his statements about telepathy, noting that he did not address the known objections. His book Historic Ghosts and Ghost-Hunters (1909) is generally skeptical of poltergeist cases, concluding they are best explained by fraud and psychological factors such as hallucination or suggestion. He was a trustee of the American Society for Psychical Research and contributed articles to the Tomorrow magazine.

== Publications ==
- The Riddle of Personality (1908)
- Historic Ghosts and Ghost-Hunters (1909)
- The Romance of American Expansion (1909)
- Daniel Boone and the Wilderness Land (1910)
- A translation of Leroy-Beaulieu's The United States in the Twentieth Century (1906; new edition, 1911)
- Scientific Mental Healing (1911)
- Woman in the Making of America (1912)
- Above the Clouds and Old New York (1913)
- Adventurings in the Psychical (1914)
- Sleep and Sleeplessness (1915)
- Psychology and Parenthood (1915)
- The Riddle of Personality (new and revised edition, 1916)
- Handicaps of Childhood (1917)
- Nerve Control and How to Gain It (1919)
- Self-Development (1921)
