= Catholic Club of New York =

Catholic Club of New York was a social Catholic organization founded by the Xavier Alumni Sodality in 1888.

== History ==
The club originated from the Xavier Alumni Sodality, organized in 1863, in connection with the College of St. Francis Xavier. It was directed by Rev. P.F. Dealy, S.J. The club was formally opened 13 March 1871, with a membership of about 150, and Joseph Thoron was elected its first president, in the March of the same year. On January 1, 1888, the name was changed from the Xavier Union to the Catholic Club of the City of New York.
