= Henry R. Evans =

American magician and journalist (1861–1949)

Henry Ridgely Evans
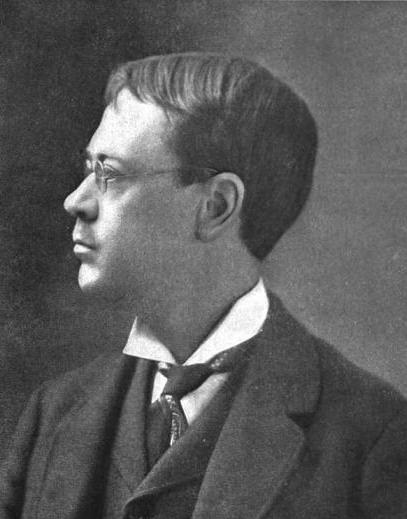
- Born: 1861
- Died: 1949 (aged 87–88)
- Occupations: Magician, journalist

Henry Ridgely Evans (November 7, 1861 in Baltimore, Maryland– 1949) was an American magician and journalist.

== Biography ==
Evans worked in Baltimore, Maryland as a journalist and wrote books on conjurer tricks and magic. He has been described as a "great historian of the magic arts" and "an exemplary historian and biographer of magic". He was a critic of spiritualism and theosophy and exposed the fraudulent tricks of mediums.

Evans contributed to the book Magic Stage Illusions and Scientific Diversions, Including Trick Photography which received a positive review by the psychologist Joseph Jastrow. Author William Lindsay Gresham described Evans' book History of Conjuring and Magic (1928) as a "treasure house of data on magic, magicians, and productions".

== Correspondence with Harry Houdini ==
The magician Harry Houdini wrote that Evans' book The Old and the New Magic was a notable book on the history of magic but he "falls into the error of his predecessors in accepting as authoritative the history of magic and magicians furnished by Robert Houdin. He has made no effort whatever to verify or refute the statements made by Robert-Houdin, but has merely compiled and re-written them to suit his twentieth-century readers".

Houdini had originally planned to write a book known as History Makers in the World of Magic; however, he gave up on this idea and handed over the material he had written to Evans, who was also working on a similar book of his own. Houdini proposed that on the title page the book appeared "as originally planned by Harry Houdini and Evans". It is unclear if the book was ever published.

Evans worked on a scrapbook that contained matters dealing with spiritualism and trickery. He gave it to Houdini in 1924. It is now estimated to be worth over $35,000.

== Publications ==
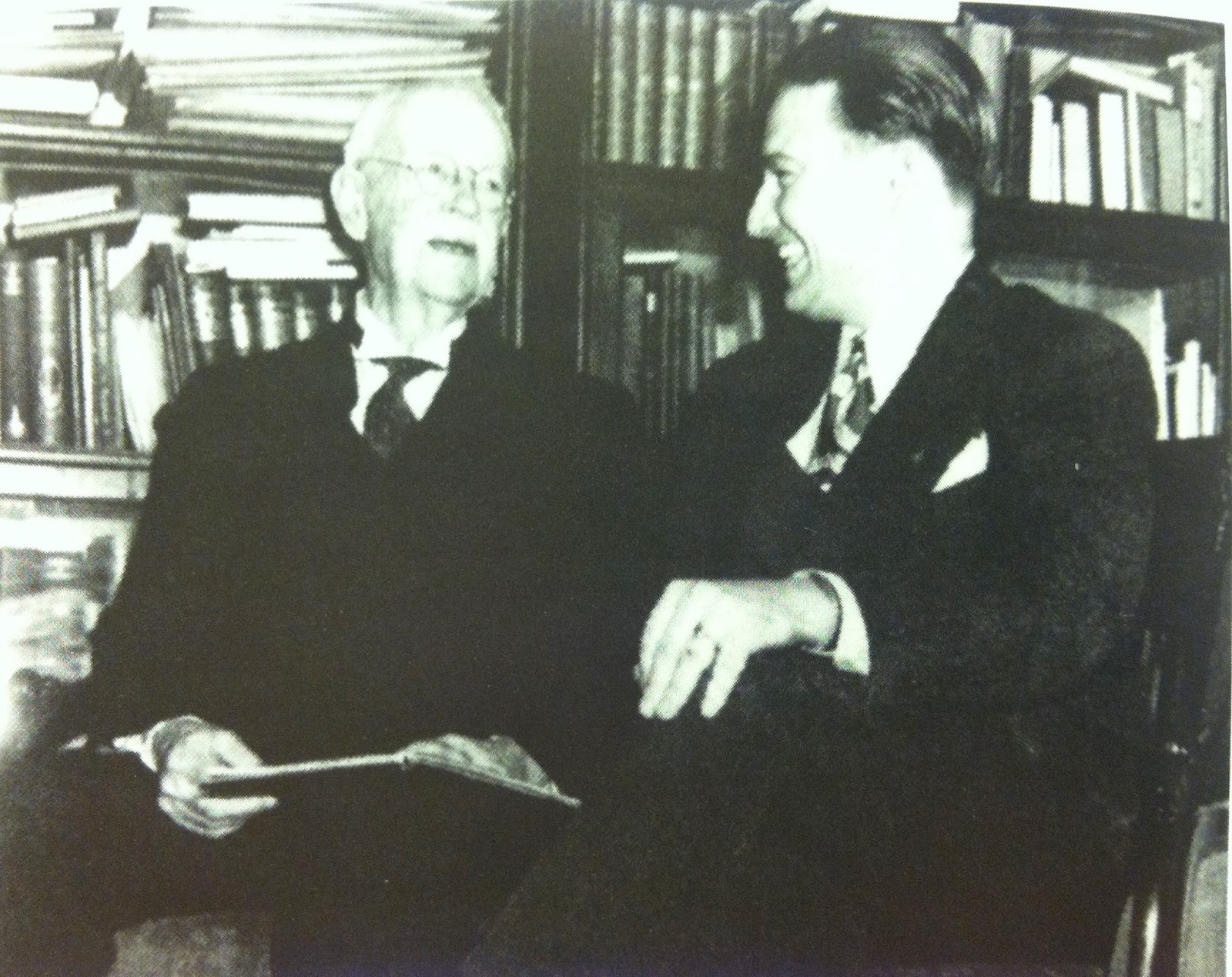
Evans with magician Milbourne Christopher.

Articles

- Egyptian Mysteries and Modern Freemasonry (1903) The Open Court
- Eliphas Levi-Magician and Mystic (1904) The Open Court
- Some Magicians I Have Met. (1905). The Open Court. Vol. 19, Issue 8.
- Madame Blavatsky. (1904). The Monist. Vol. 14, No. 3. pp. 387–408.
- Cagliostro-A Study in Charlatanism. (1903). The Monist. Vol. 13, No. 4. pp. 523–552.
- Jugglers and Juggling. The Linking Ring, February and March 1938.

Books

- The Shorthand Clerk: A Manual of Practical Instruction (1880)
- Hours with the Ghosts, Or, Nineteenth Century Witchcraft (1897)
- Magic: Stage Illusions and Scientific Diversions, Including Trick Photography (1897)
- Magic and Its Professors (1902)
- The Spirit World Unmasked (1902)
- The Napoleon Myth (1905)
- The Old and the New Magic (1906)
- The House of the Sphinx: A Novel (1907)
- Cagliostro and His Egyptian Rite of Freemasonry (1919, 1930)
- Adventures in Magic (1927)
- History of Conjuring and Magic (1928)
- Cagliostro: A Sorcerer of the Eighteenth Century (1931)
- A Master of Modern Magic: The Life and Adventures of Robert-Houdin (1932)
- Edgar Allan Poe and Baron von Kempelen's Chess-Playing Automaton (1939)
- Some Rare Old Books on Conjuring and Magic (1943)
