= Ernest Barthez =

French physician (1811–1891)

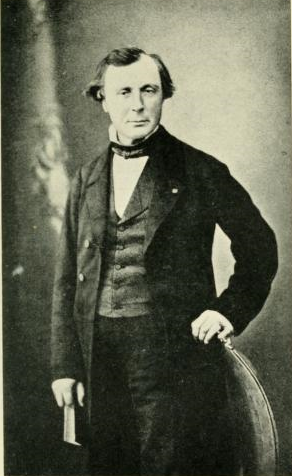
Dr. Barthez

Antoine Charles Ernest Barthez (1811-1891) most well known as Dr. Barthez was a French physician.

Barthez produced three volumes on children's diseases with Frédéric Rilliet (1814-1861). He was influential in the study of child neurology.

He was the grandnephew of the distinguished physician Paul Joseph Barthez. Barthez worked as a physician at the court of Napoleon III and Eugénie de Montijo. In 1912, posthumous letters from Barthez were made public in a book translated by Bernard Miall. One letter caused controversy as it alleged that the medium Daniel Dunglas Home was caught using his foot to fake supposed spirit effects during a séance in Biarritz in 1857.

== Publications ==
- Treatise on the Pneumonia of Children (1841)
- Traite clinique et pratique des maladies des enfants (3 volumes, 1843)
- The Empress Eugénie and Her Circle (English edition by T. Fisher Unwin, 1912. Also published in New York: Brentano's, 1913).
