= William Hodson Brock =

British chemist and science historian (1936–2025)

William Hodson Brock (1936 – 16 February 2025) was a British chemist and science historian.

== Life and career ==
Brock was born in Brighton in 1936. He studied chemistry at University College London and the history and philosophy of science at the University of Leicester to become a lecturer on the subject. He earned a Ph.D. for his biography of the chemist William Prout which was expanded into the book, From Protyle to Proton: William Prout and the Nature of Matter, 1785–1985 (1985). Brock remained at Leicester until he retired in 1998 as Emeritus Professor of History of Science.

Brock has written biographies of famous chemists such as Justus von Liebig, August Wilhelm von Hofmann and William Crookes.

In 1995, Brock received the Dexter Award for Outstanding Achievement in the History of Chemistry from the American Chemical Society.

Brock died on 16 February 2025, at the age of 88.

== Publications ==
- Justus von Liebig und August Wilhelm Hofmann in ihren Briefen (1841–1873) (1984)
- From Protyle to Proton: William Prout and the Nature of Matter, 1785–1985 (1985)
- The Fontana History of Chemistry (1992)
- The Norton History of Chemistry (1993)
- Science for All: Studies in the History of Victorian Science and Education (1996)
- William Crookes (1832–1919) and the Commercialization of Science (2008)
- The Case of the Poisonous Socks: Tales from Chemistry (2011)
