= Amos Norton Craft =

American writer

Amos Norton Craft (July 7, 1844 - August 30, 1912) was an American Methodist and early skeptic writer.

Craft was born in Mecca, Ohio, on July 7, 1844. He married Alice Alvira Judson on March 10, 1863. They had four children. Craft graduated from Mount Union College in 1865. He was a minister of the Methodist Episcopal Church. In 1878 he settled in Oil City, Pennsylvania.

Craft obtained a PhD in philosophy from Mount Union College. He is most well known for his Epidemic Delusions (1881). According to skeptic Daniel Loxton the book is a "critical gaze over spirit mediums, end of the world panics, bogus religious relics, witch-hunting manias, haunted houses, clairvoyance, and mesmerism. Again and again he hammered home the point that paranormal claims rest upon arguments from ignorance."

Craft died on August 30, 1912, in Meadville, Pennsylvania.

== Publications ==
- Epidemic Delusions: Exposé of the Superstitions and Frauds Which Underlie Some Ancient and Modern Delusions (1881)
- Exodus From Poverty: Or The Other Economics (1914)

== See also ==
- Daniel Webster Hering
