= Anna Eva Fay =

American spiritual medium (1851–1927)

Anna Eva Fay (Ann Eliza Heathman)
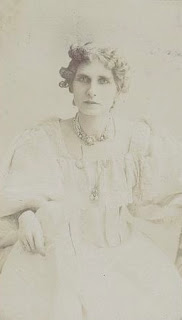
- Born: March 31, 1851
- Died: May 12, 1927 (aged 76)
- Occupations: Stage mentalist, medium

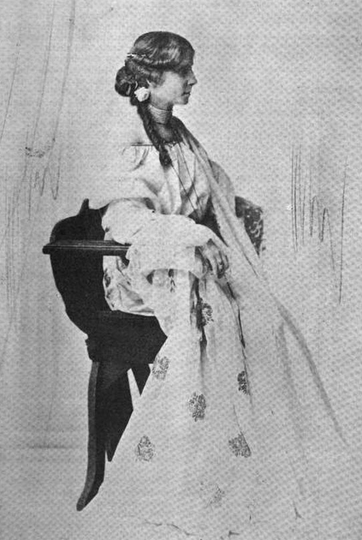
Anna Eva Fay, from a 1907 publication.

Anna Eva Fay Pingree (March 31, 1851 – May 12, 1927) was a famous medium and stage mentalist of the twentieth century.

== Biography ==
Fay was born Ann Eliza Heathman in Southington, Ohio. She married Henry Melville Cummings, a medium, who went by the name Henry Melville Fay. She adopted the stage name of Annie Fay and began to perform as a stage medium. She became famous for her vaudeville and stage performances in the 1880s and 1890s, where she was billed as "The Indescribable Phenomenon".

Through her career, Fay was exposed as a fraudulent medium. Fay was known for employing assistants including several who would dig up information about séance sitters in the towns that she visited.

In the early 1870s the American stage mentalist Washington Irving Bishop was the manager of Fay's spiritualist acts, but in 1876 exposed her trick methods to the media. In 1883 the ex-medium John W. Truesdell revealed her method of freeing her hands from cotton bandages.

Her first husband died on May 29, 1889. Her second husband was stage manager David H. Pingree, who died in 1932. Her son, John Fay, also a magician, married Anna Norman and committed suicide in 1908. Fay applied for a membership to The Magic Circle and in 1913 during a tour in Britain, she was elected the first Honorary Lady Associate of The Magic Circle in London. Fay died on May 20, 1927. She is buried at Wyoming Cemetery in Melrose Massachusetts.

In 1942, Harry Price of the National Laboratory of Psychical Research exposed the 'mechanical stool' trick of Fay.

== Crookes experiment ==
In a series of experiments in London at the house of William Crookes in February 1875, Fay managed to fool Crookes into believing she had genuine psychic powers. Crookes had Fay hold two electrodes in an electrical circuit connected with a galvanometer in an adjoining room. Movement of objects occurred in the room and a music instrument was played. Crookes was convinced that the electrical control had not been broken. Psychical researchers pointed out that Fay could have used other parts of her body or a resistance coil to maintain the electric current intact whilst her hands could be free to produce the phenomena during the experiment. Frank Podmore described the experiment in detail.

Fay used magic tricks to accomplish her mediumship feats. She confessed in 1913 to Eric Dingwall that she had duped Crookes and other scientists. She was investigated by the magician Harry Houdini, to whom after her retirement in 1924 she confessed fraud and revealed the tricks that she had used. Fay told Houdini the trick she had used on the Crookes galvanometer test: she gripped one handle of the battery beneath her knee joint, keeping the circuit unbroken, leaving one hand free. Magic historian Barry Wiley suggested that Fay had beaten the galvanometer tests by working with a secret accomplice Charles Henry Gimingham (1853–90), an assistant of Crookes who had built the experimental apparatus.
