= Sherrie Lynne Lyons =

American author, science historian and skeptic

Sherrie Lynne Lyons (born 1947) is an American author, science historian and skeptic.

Lyons worked as an assistant professor at the Center for Distance Learning of Empire State College at the State University of New York.

She is the author of the book Species, Serpents, Spirits, and Skulls: Science at the Margins in the Victorian Age (2011), which explores the distinctions between science and pseudoscience. The book contains skeptical information on cryptozoology, parapsychology, phrenology and spiritualism. It is notable for documenting the early scientific debates about sea serpents.

== Publications ==
- Thomas Henry Huxley: The Evolution of a Scientist (Prometheus Books, 1999)
- Species, Serpents, Spirits, and Skulls: Science at the Margins in the Victorian Age (State University of New York Press, 2010) ISBN 978-1-4384-2802-4
- Evolution: The Basics (Routledge, 2011)
- From Cells to Organisms: Re-Envisioning Cell Theory (University of Toronto Press, 2020) ISBN 978-1-4426-3509-8
