= Merrifield (surname) =

Merrifield is a surname.

== List of people with the surname ==
- Andy Merrifield (born 1960), British Marxist urban theorist
- Charles T. Merrifield (c. 1924–1957), American uranium miner and murder victim
- Charles Watkins Merrifield (1827–1884), British mathematician
- Dave Merrifield (born 1941), Canadian ice hockey player
- Donald Merrifield (1928–2010), American Jesuit
- Eric Mowbray Merrifield, South African engineer, inventor of the dolos
- Flora Merrifield (1859–1943), British suffragist
- Frankie Merrifield (born 1994), English footballer
- Frederick Merrifield (1831–1924), English lepidopterist
- John H. Merrifield (1847–1906), American politician
- Lane Merrifield, Canadian entrepreneur, co-creator of Club Penguin
- Leonard Stanford Merrifield (1880–1943), British sculptor
- Lester Levern Merrifield (1921–2000), American orthodontist
- Louisa May Merrifield (1906–1953), British poisoner
- Mary Philadelphia Merrifield (1804–1889), British algologist and writer
- Michael Merrifield (born 1946/47), American politician
- Michael Merrifield, English astronomer and professor
- Ralph Merrifield (1913–1995), English museum curator and archaeologist
- Renee Merrifield, Canadian politician
- Rob Merrifield (born 1953), Canadian politician and diplomat
- Robert Bruce Merrifield (1921–2006), American biochemist, inventor of solid phase peptide synthesis
- Samuel Merrifield (1904–1982), Australian politician
- Webster Merrifield (1852–1916), American educator and academic
- Whit Merrifield (born 1989), American baseball player
- William Merrifield (1890–1943), Canadian Victoria Cross recipient

== See also ==
- Merrifield (disambiguation)
- Merryfield
