= The Virgin in Prayer =

Painting by Giovanni Battista Salvi da Sassoferrato

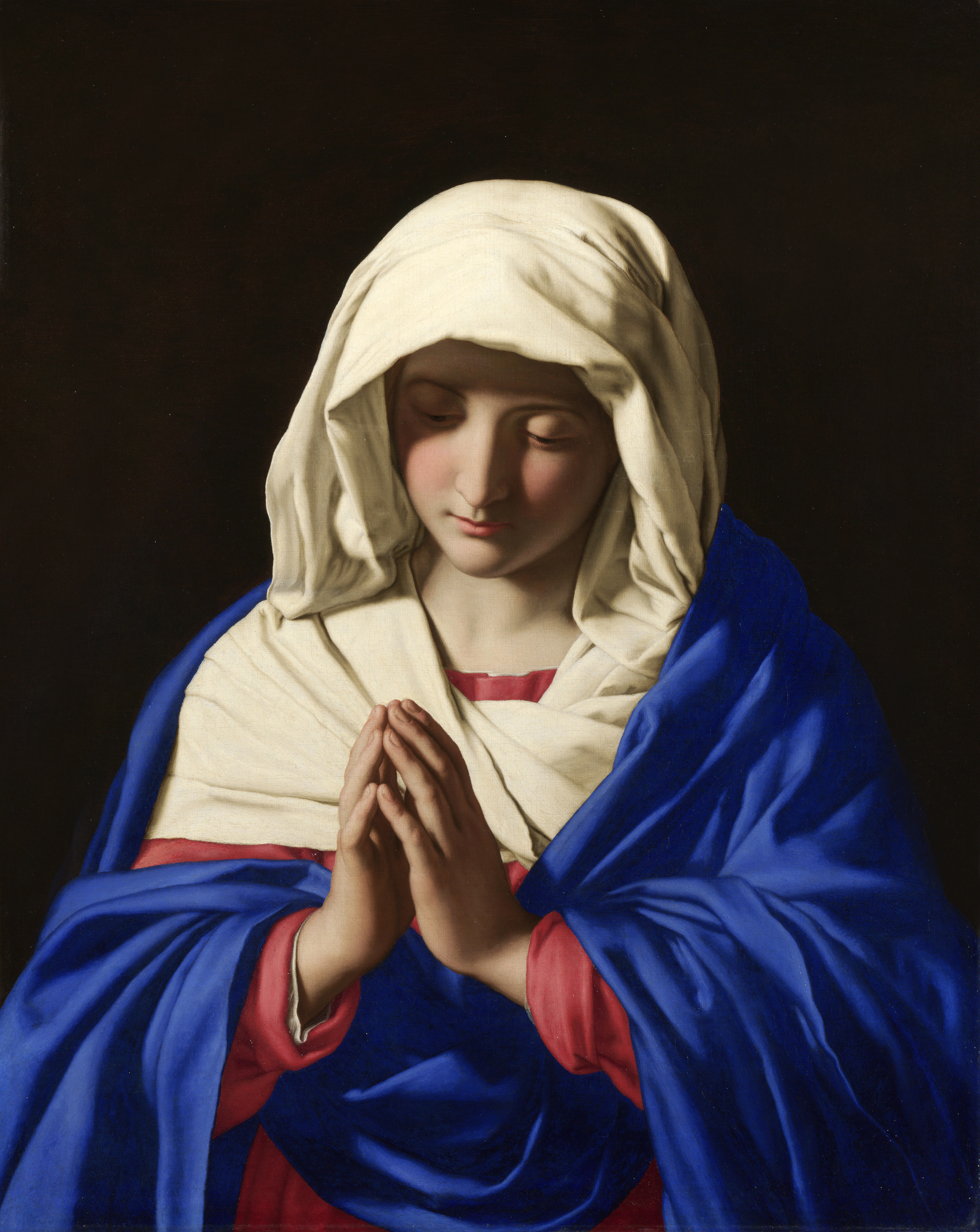
- Artist: Giovanni Battista Salvi da Sassoferrato
- Year: c. 1640–1650
- Medium: Oil on canvas
- Dimensions: 73 cm × 58 cm (29 in × 23 in)
- Location: National Gallery; London, UK

The Virgin in Prayer is an oil painting by the Italian artist Giovanni Battista Salvi da Sassoferrato, painted in c. 1640–1650, and currently displayed at the National Gallery. Its dimensions are 73 by 58 cm (29 by 23 in). The painting is a life-size depiction of the Virgin Mary praying in quiet devotion.

== Description ==
The plain and dark background contrasts with the Virgin's radiant bowed head and the white headdress covering it, and her hands are gently closed together. Bright light draws the viewer's attention to the luminous blue drapery and the lifelike folds of the fabric. The portrait is designed for its simplicity with just three colours—red, white and blue—without any details to draw attention away from its praying figure. The Virgin is brightly lit and her flawless porcelain-like skin lends a sculptural quality to the painting and makes the audience feel to be in her real presence. The bright light from her blue robe combined with the dark background makes the central figure look more brilliant. The blue garment is painted using an ultramarine pigment made from lapis lazuli, a semi-precious stone mined from north-eastern Afghanistan, which was a costly pigment.

During the 16th century, the Reformers of the Roman Catholic Church advocated a more personal approach to worship that would result in individual contemplation. By the 17th century the Virgin alone in a prayer was a common subject in religious painting. Sassoferrato had a dozen copies of this kind of depiction of the Virgin in his studio. The work was greatly inspired by the earlier artists Raphael and Perugino. In this painting Sassoferrato was more inspired by Raphael, whose paintings feature brilliantly elegant coloured robes and sculpted facial features. Another work by Sassoferrato which shows the influence of Raphael is The Virgin and Child Embracing, which focusses on the Virgin's son. Both paintings were acquired by the National Gallery in the mid-19th-century, when Sassoferrato's work was receiving renewed interest in the London art world, as well as the art of Raphael.

Sassoferrato specialised in depicting the Virgin in prayer, a subject which had developed in art during the 15th century, but had grown in popularity in the 16th century as the Reformers of the Roman Catholic Church advocated a more personal approach to worship that would result in individual contemplation and devotion. Sassoferrato made at least four designs on this theme, from which versions were painted by himself and others by his assistant studio. He capitalised on making these relatively small pictures which appealed to private collectors. He is widely known today as a master of painting the Virgin in prayer.

== Other versions ==
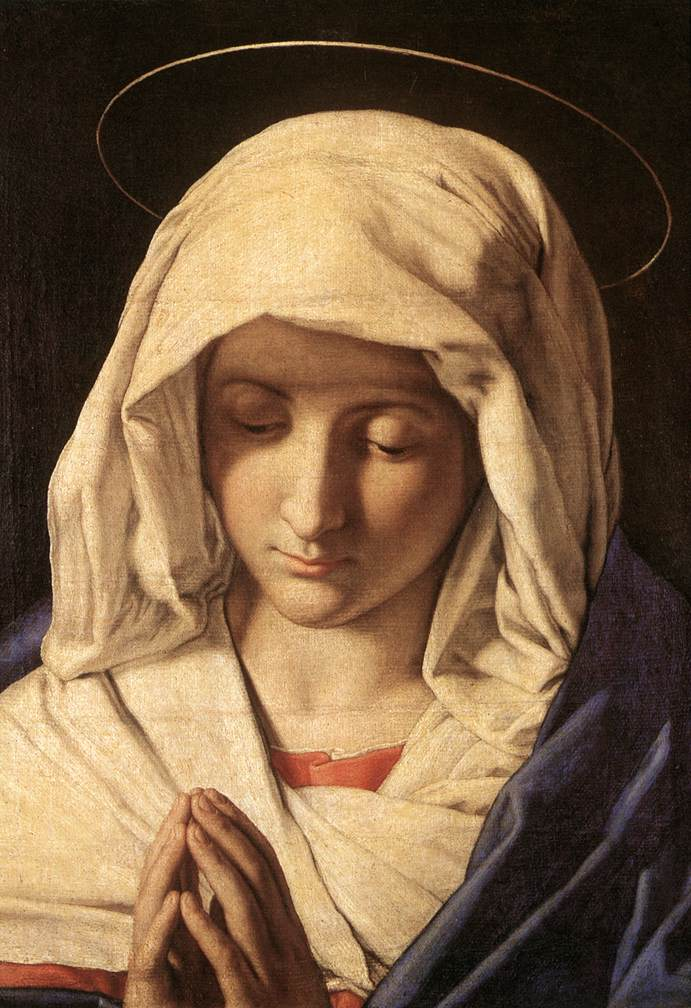
Bergamo version

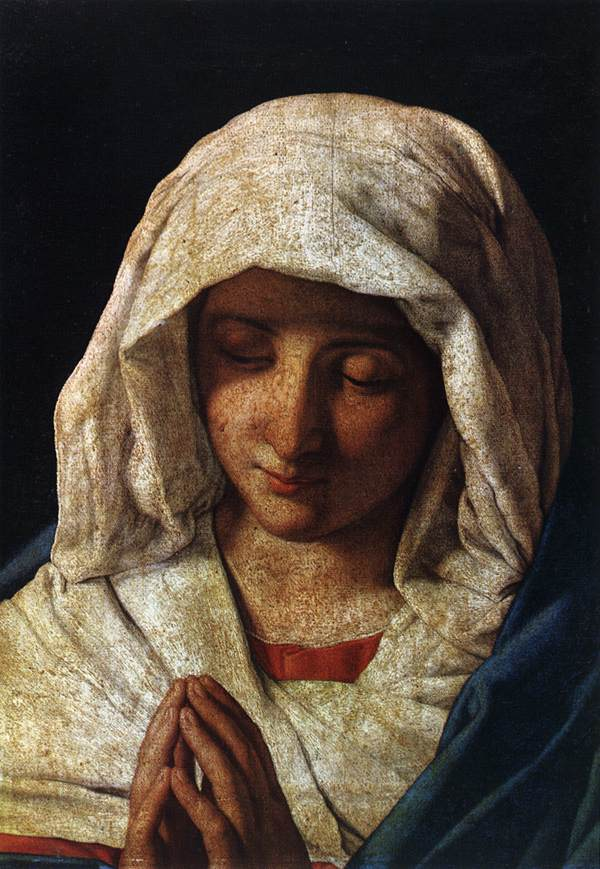
Venice version

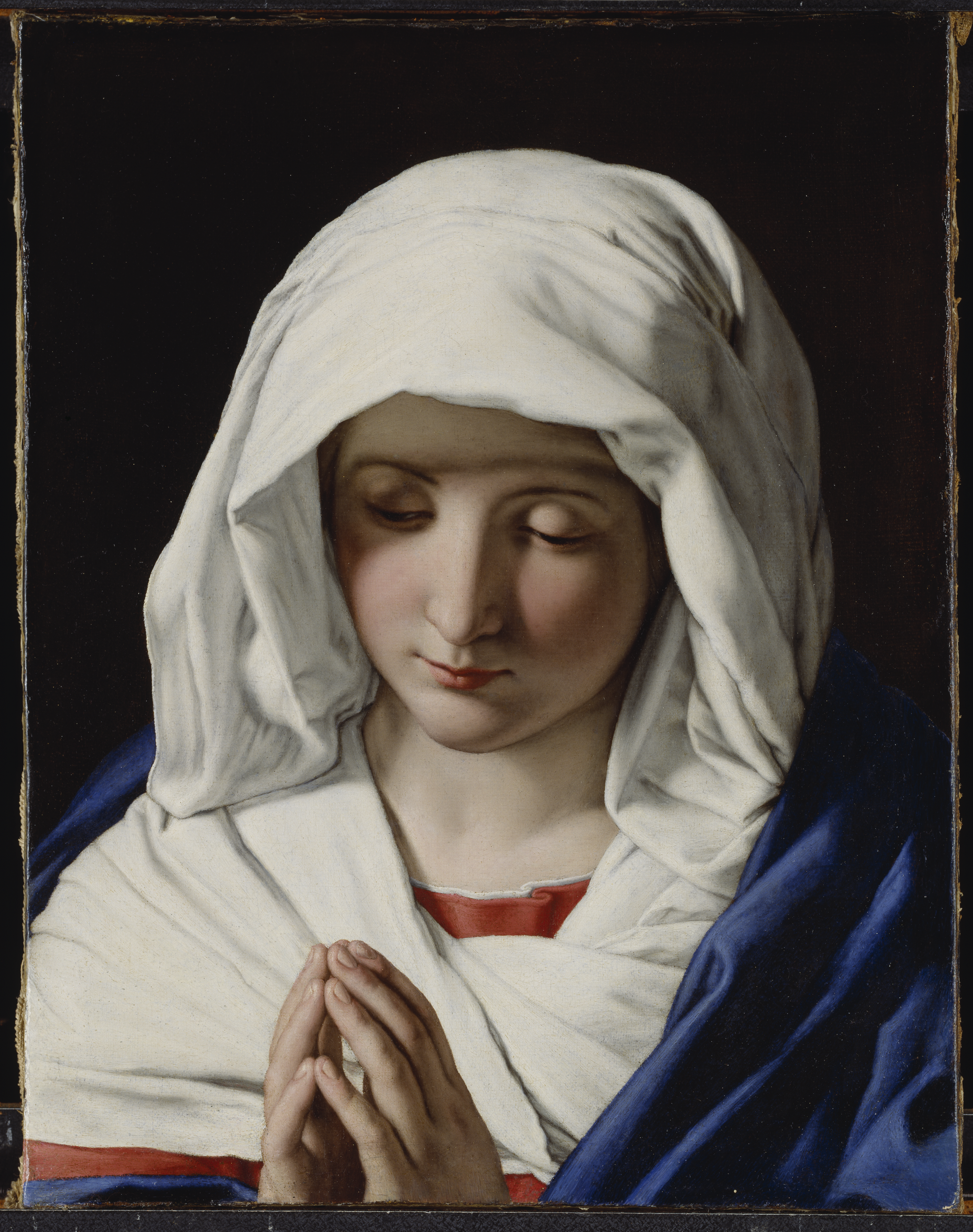
Stockholm version

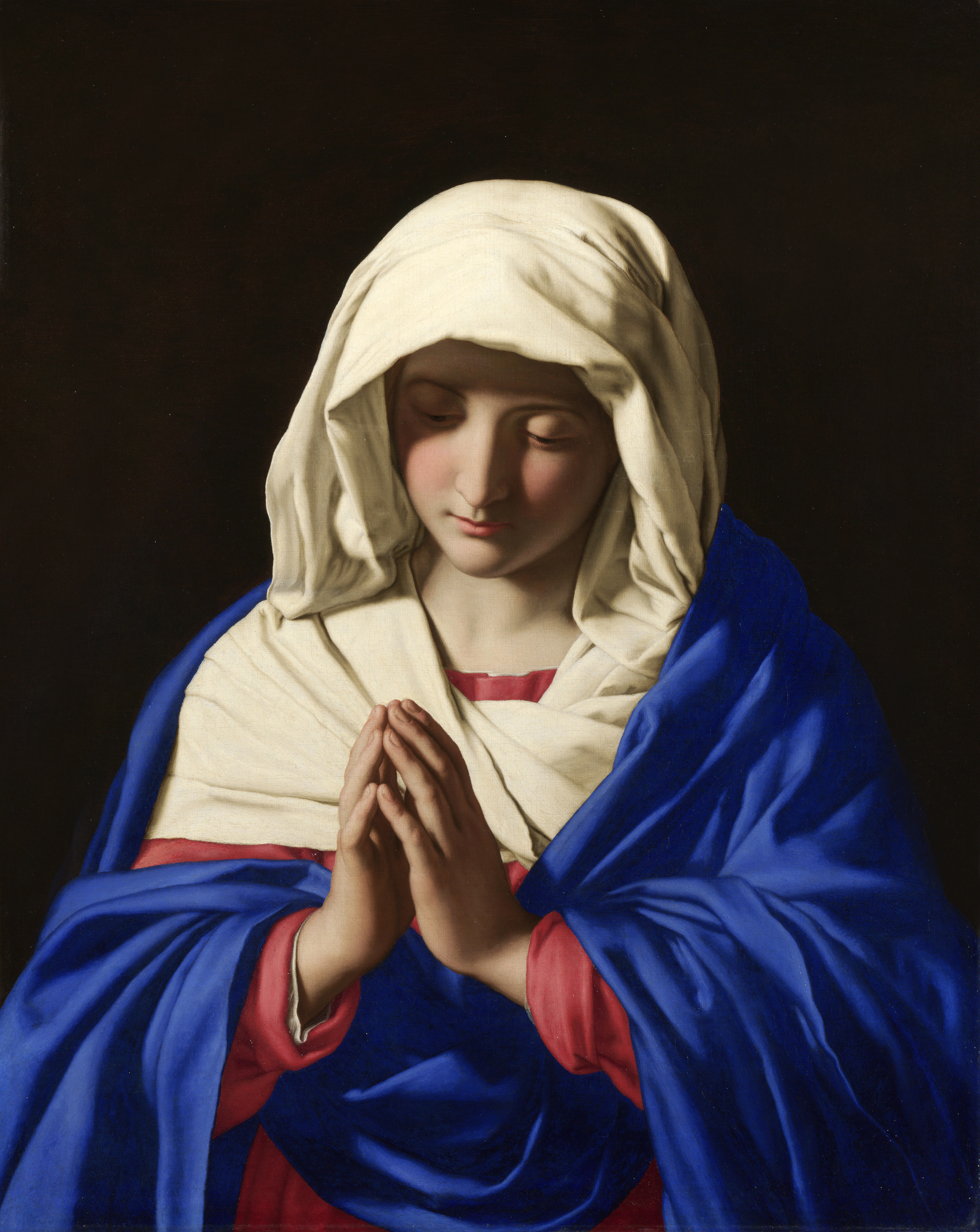
London version

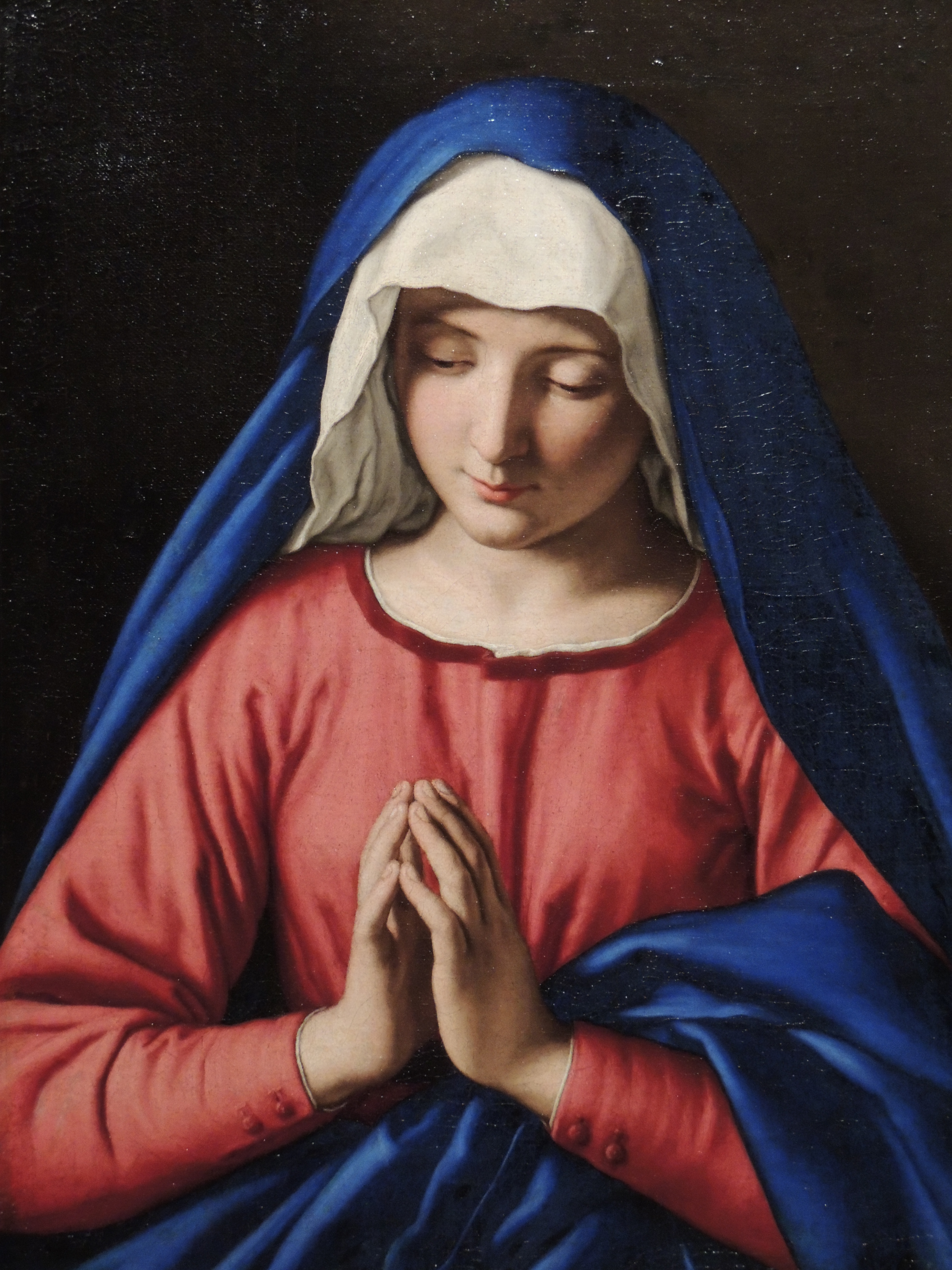
Strasbourg version
