= Flora Merrifield =

British suffragist

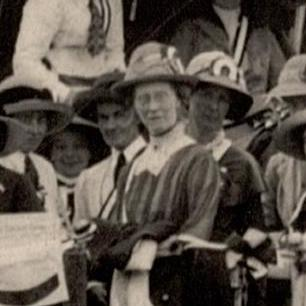
- Flora Merrifield
- Born: 1859; Brighton, Sussex, England
- Died: 1943 (aged 83–84); Brighton, England
- Organization(s): Brighton and Hove Women's Franchise Society; Lewes Women's Suffrage Society
- Known for: Leading suffragist
- Father: Frederick Merrifield
- Relatives: Margaret Verrall (sister); Charles Watkins Merrifield (uncle); Mary Philadelphia Merrifield (grandmother)

Flora (de Gaudrion) Merrifield (1859–1943, Brighton) was a leading British suffragist in Brighton who campaigned for the women's right to vote.

== Family ==
Flora was born in 1859 in Brighton. She was the granddaughter of artist and author Mary Philadelphia Merrifield and the daughter of barrister Frederick Merrifield and his wife Maria Merrifield (née de Gaudrion). As child, Flora lived with her parents and elder sister at 48 Park Crescent in Brighton. Flora's sister later became a classical scholar Margaret de Gaudrion Verrall (née Merrifield), while her uncle was the mathematician, Charles Watkins Merrifield. As a young woman, Flora was present at the opening of the Brighton School of Art, of which her father was Chair, and presented Princess Louise, Duchess of Argyll with a programme drawn up by the students.

== Suffrage campaigning ==
Flora's parents were active members of the Brighton committee of the National Society for Women's Suffrage, along with Henry Fawcett and Millicent Fawcett. In 1906, the Brighton and Hove Women's Franchise Society was re-founded as a local committee of the London Society, with Flora as secretary and her sister-in-law Marian Verrall as treasurer.

A committee was formed in February 1908 from the remaining members of the committee started two years previously by Miss Watson, an organiser from London. Marian Verrall of West Hoathly would later become the President of the Cuckfield and Central Sussex Women's Suffrage Society and was the sister of Flora's brother-in-law, the classics scholar Arthur Woollgar Verrall. The Brighton society grew rapidly and had five hundred members by 1910.

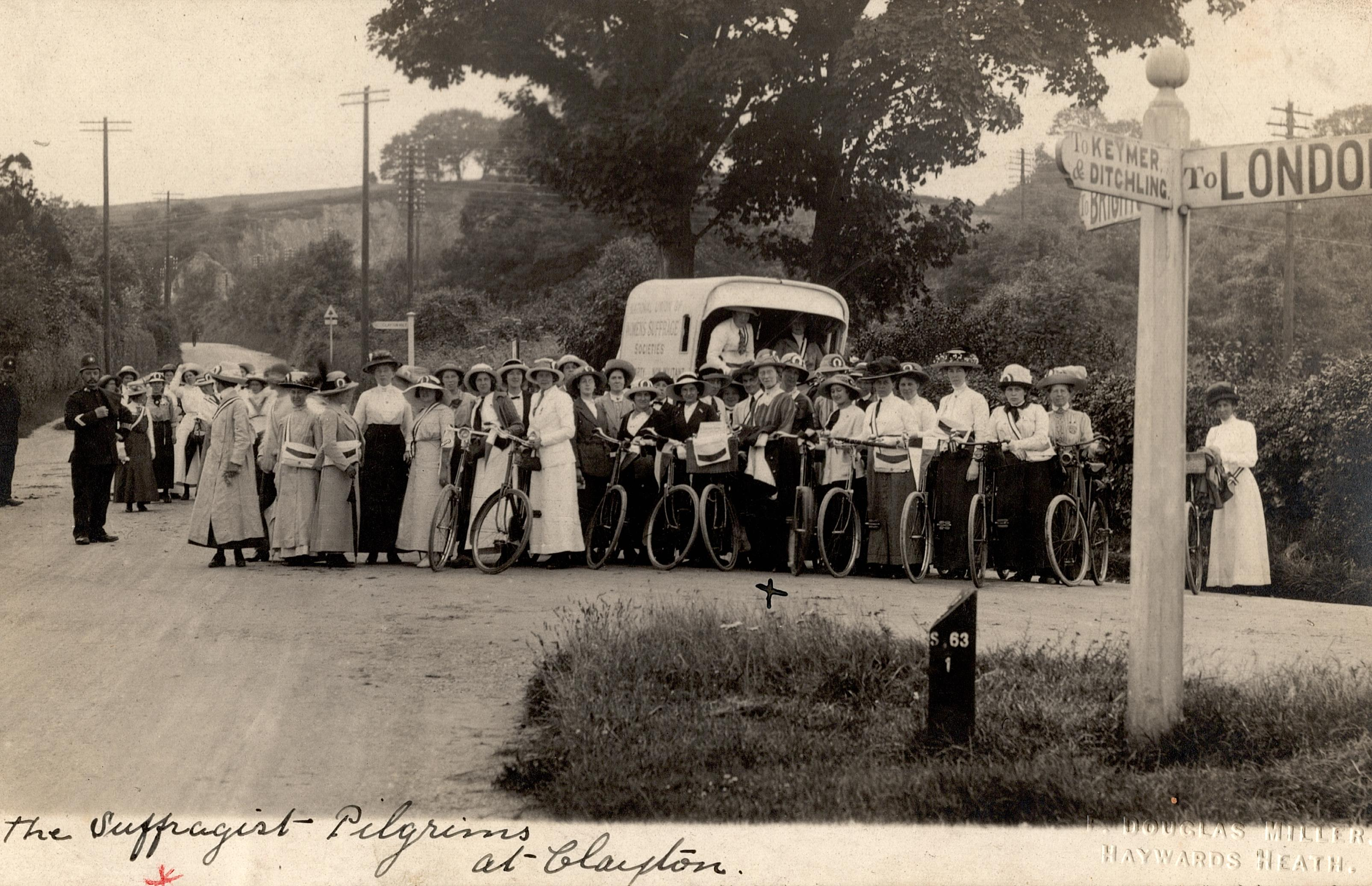
Flora (de Gaudrion) Merrifield in Croydon, central figure marked with a cross.

Flora campaigned to establish a similar society in neighbouring Lewes, visiting the town several times from 1908 onwards, and chairing the meeting that led to the creation of the Lewes Women's Suffrage Society in 1910. She also led suffrage campaigners on the Great Pilgrimage as they walked through Sussex to London in July 1913. Flora was secretary for the Brighton branch of the League of Nations and, after her mother's death, lived with her elderly father at 14 Clifton Terrace, Brighton. She died in 1943.
