= Mary Philadelphia Merrifield =

British writer on art, and algologist (1804–1889)

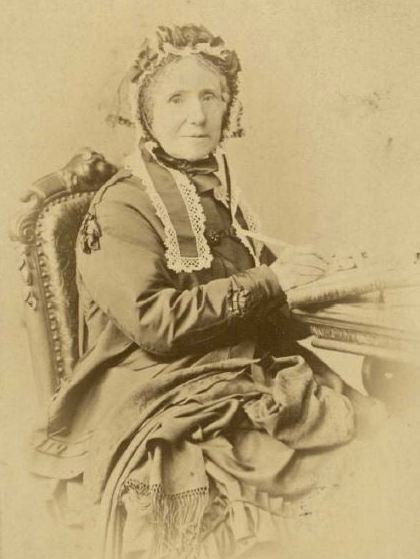
- Born: Mary Philadelphia Watkins; 15 April 1804; Brompton, London, England
- Died: 4 January 1889 (aged 84); Stapleford, Cambridgeshire, England
- Occupations: Author and artist
- Spouse: John Merrifield (c.1791–1877)
- Children: 5, including Charles Watkins Merrifield and Frederick Merrifield
- Parent: Sir Charles Watkins
- Relatives: Grand-daughters Margaret Verrall and Flora Merrifield

Mary Philadelphia Merrifield (née Watkins; 15 April 1804 – 4 January 1889) was a British writer on art and fashion. She later became an algologist (an expert on seaweed).

== Life ==
She was born Mary Philadelphia Watkins in Brompton, London in 1804. Her father, Sir Charles Watkins, was a barrister who specialised in transferring property ownership. In 1826/7, she married John Merrifield and gave birth in 1827 to a son, Charles Watkins Merrifield, and a second son Frederick Merrifield in 1831. Their other children were Henry born 1830, Emily born 1835 and Edward born 1836.

They later moved to Dorset Gardens, Brighton. Her husband worked as a barrister and she undertook the translation of a book on painting by the 15th-century artist Cennino Cennini. The book, Treatise of Painting, was published in 1844.

In 1846, she published The Art of Fresco Painting, which was a commission for the Royal Commission on the Fine Arts, being assisted by her two sons. In 1850, she exhibited her paintings in the first art exhibition held in Brighton's Royal Pavilion.

In 1851, Merrifield wrote the essay Harmony of Colours, which was published in The Art-Journal Illustrated Catalogue of the Great Exhibition. The text formed part of the introductory essays accompanying the richly illustrated catalogue of decorative arts objects exhibited at the Great Exhibition in London.

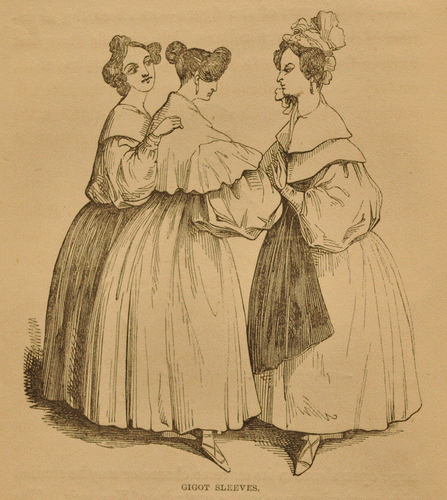
Mary Merrifield on Fashion

In 1854, she chose a different subject and published Dress as a Fine Art, which supported the more practical improvements of Amelia Bloomer. Her approach challenged stereotypes, showing that fashion was a subject capable of scientific study. She demonstrated that people who were interested in fashion could aspire to academic interest.

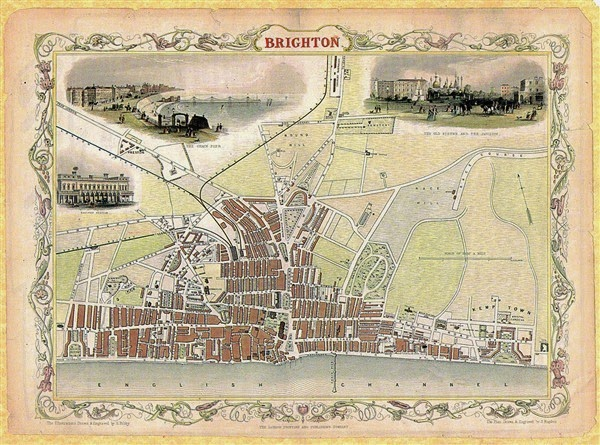
Mary Merrifield on Brighton

In 1857, she was showing her knowledge of local history when she published Brighton Past and Present.

In 1857, she was honoured with a civil list pension of £100 per year. She used her location at Brighton to research A Sketch of the Natural History of Brighton which, together with later scientific papers, made her an expert on seaweed. In the 1870s she published more papers on natural history. She was so interested in corresponding with the naturalist Jacob Georg Agardh that she learnt Swedish. Agardh returned the compliment by naming an Australian algae, Rytiphlaea Merrifieldiae (aka Nanopera merrifieldiae), after her.

She continued to publish papers in the British scientific journal Nature. She also worked arranging natural history displays at Brighton Museum and Art Gallery.

== Death and legacy ==
Merrifield died a widow at her daughter's house in Stapleford on 4 January 1889. Her plant collections are now held by the Natural History Museum in London, with some examples in the Booth Museum of Natural History in Brighton. Her son, Frederick, was later Chair of Brighton School of Art, while one of granddaughters Margaret Verrall became a classical scholar, and another, Flora Merrifield, was a campaigner for women's suffrage in Sussex. Mary's work was the subject of a display in Brighton's Booth Museum of Natural History in 2019.

== Works ==
- Treatise of Painting (translation) - 1844
- The Art of Fresco Painting - 1846
- Original Treatises on the Arts of Painting in Oil, Miniature, Mosaic, and On Glass; of Gilding, Dyeing, and the Preparation of Colours and Artificial Gems; Preceded by a General Introduction; with Translations, Prefaces, and Notes - 1849
- Practical Directions for Portrait Painting in Watercolours - 1851
- Dress as a Fine Art - 1854
- Handbook of Light and Shade with Reference to Model Drawing - 1855
- Brighton Past and Present - 1857
- A Sketch of the Natural History of Brighton - 1864
