= Charles Watkins Merrifield =

English mathematician

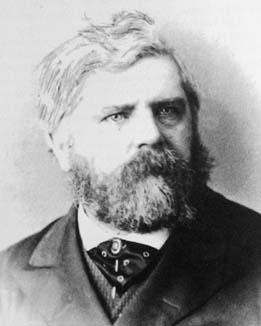
Charles Merrifield

Charles Watkins Merrifield FRS (20 October 1827 – 1 January 1884, Hove) was a British mathematician.

Having entered for the Bar, he in 1847 received from the then Marquis of Lansdowne an appointment in the Education Department of the Privy Council Office. Though called to the Bar in due course, he never practised, but was speedily promoted to the office of an Examiner, the duties of which he discharged with marked attention and success, while finding time for other work which made for him a name among men of science. ... He was an early member of the Royal Institute of Naval Architects, of which he was for many years Honorary Secretary, receiving a handsome testimonial on his retirement in 1875. Some mathematical papers he had contributed to the Transactions of some of the learned societies, and especially some memoirs on the calculation of elliptic integrals in the Philosophical Transactions, led to his election as a Fellow of the Royal Society in 1863. In 1867 the Government established the Royal School of Naval Architecture and Marine Engineering at South Kensington, and Mr. C. W. Merrifield, at the request of the authorities, accepted the office of Vice-Principal. He only intended to take this as a temporary measure, but as the result of the lamented death of Mr. Purkiss, who was to have been Principal, Mr. Merrifield was appointed to that office. On the transfer of the Institution to Greenwich in 1873, he resumed his office of Examiner in the Education Department.

For the British Association's Section of Mechanical Science, he was in 1875 the Section's Vice-President at the Brighton meeting and then in 1876 the Section's President at the Glasgow meeting. He served on the British Association's committee given the task of reporting on Charles Babbage’s analytical machine. For the London Mathematical Society, he served as Vice-President in 1876–1878, as President in 1878–1880, and as Treasurer in 1880–1882.

Charles was the eldest son of the author and artist Mary Philadelphia Merrifield and brother of the barrister Frederick Merrifield. His nieces were the classical scholar Margaret Verrall (nee Merrifield) and suffrage campaigner Flora Merrifield.

== Selected publications ==
- Merrifield, Charles Watkins (1872). Technical arithmetic and measurement.
- Merrifield, C. W. (1873). "Determination of the Form of the Dome of Uniform Stress". Proceedings of the London Mathematical Society. 1 (1): 113–119. doi:10.1112/plms/s1-5.1.113.
