= A. W. Verrall =

English writer and scholar (1851–1912)

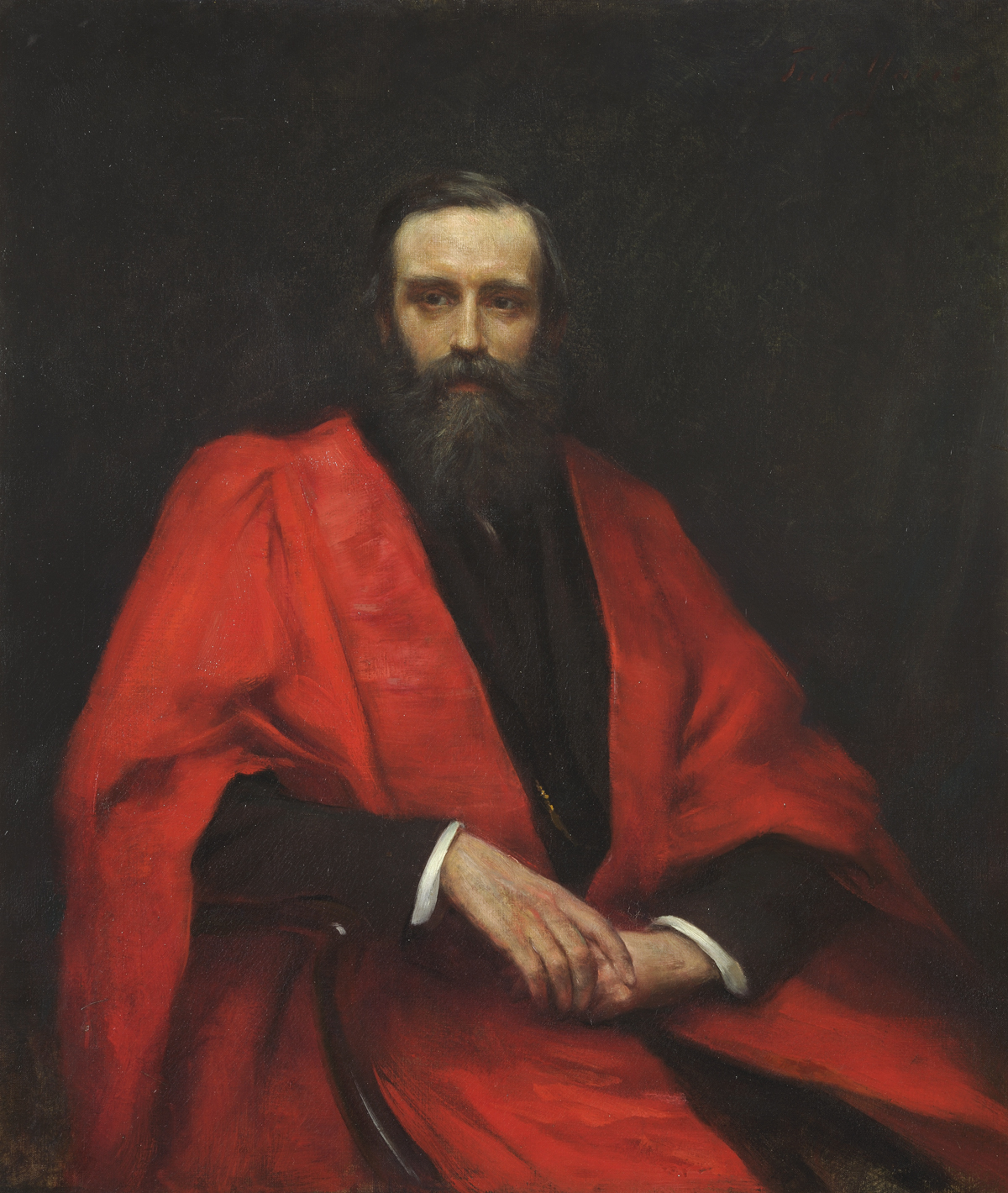
- Portrait of A. W. Verrall, c. 1880
- Born: Arthur Woollgar Verrall; 5 February 1851; Brighton, England
- Died: 18 June 1912 (aged 61); Cambridge, England
- Occupations: Writer; scholar

Arthur Woollgar Verrall (5 February 1851 – 18 June 1912) was an English writer and scholar. He was associated with Trinity College, Cambridge, and the first occupant of the King Edward VII Chair of English. He was noted for his translations and for his challenging, unorthodox interpretations of the Greek dramatists, such as his commentary on Agamemnon; his detractors found his readings contorted and too ingenious, too often overlooking obvious explanations in favour of the convoluted, and his published work is nowadays not highly regarded. After his death, admirers M. A. Bayfield and J. D. Duff edited Verrall's Collected Literary Essays. Classical and Modern and Collected Essays in Greek and Latin Scholarship 1914. Among his publications, Euripides the Rationalist (1895) was highly influential. He was a member of the Cambridge Apostles, a secret society, from 1871.

== Life ==
Arthur Woollgar Verrall was the son of a solicitor. He was educated at Twyford School, Wellington College, and Trinity College, Cambridge, where he graduated BA as 2nd Classic in 1872.

Elected a fellow of Trinity in 1874, he was a College Lecturer from 1877 to 1911. In February 1911, he was appointed to fill the new King Edward VII professorship of literature at Cambridge, which had been endowed by Harold Harmsworth. A Trinity Tutor from 1889 to 1899; he was tutor to Aleister Crowley.

He married Margaret De Gaudrion Merrifield, (born 21 December 1857, died 2 July 1916) in 1882. His wife, a lecturer in classics at Newnham College, gained more fame through her psychic researches — an interest Arthur shared — and as a medium. She was a member of a Cambridge group who were early explorers of Spiritualism and automatic writing. Their daughter Helen married William Henry Salter, who was later President of the Society for Psychical Research (1947–48). Mother and daughter were among mediums involved in the Palm Sunday Case, in which messages from Mary Catherine Lyttleton (who died on 21 March 1875) were supposedly transmitted by automatic writing to her lover Arthur Balfour.

He is buried at the Parish of the Ascension Burial Ground in Cambridge, with his wife and daughter, Phoebe Margaret De Gaudrion Verrall (1888-1890). His wife was a member of the Ladies Dining Society. A portrait of Verrall by Frederic Yates is in the collection of Trinity College, Cambridge. He was an uncle of Joan Riviere, psychoanalyst et member of the British Psychoanalytic Society.

=== Famous quote ===
About 1907, as a memorial to the 24 year old outstanding young scholar Kenneth John Freeman (1882-1906) Verral edited the essay the young man had prepared for his doctorate, which was entitled Schools of Hellas which the often quoted misattributed passage (to Plato, Socrates, Aristophanes et al)- which is actually a composite summary of several Ancient Greek sources of complaints about contemporary youth:

- The children now love luxury; they have bad manners, contempt for authority; they show disrespect for elders and love chatter in place of exercise. Children are now tyrants, not the servants of their households. They no longer rise when elders enter the room. They contradict their parents, chatter before company, gobble up dainties at the table, cross their legs, and tyrannize their teachers.

Verral mentions that Freeman was [a] scholar of Trinity College, Cambridge; Browne University scholar; Craven University scholar; Senior Chancellor’s medal etc.
