= Cennino Cennini =

Italian painter and writer (c. 1360–before 1427)

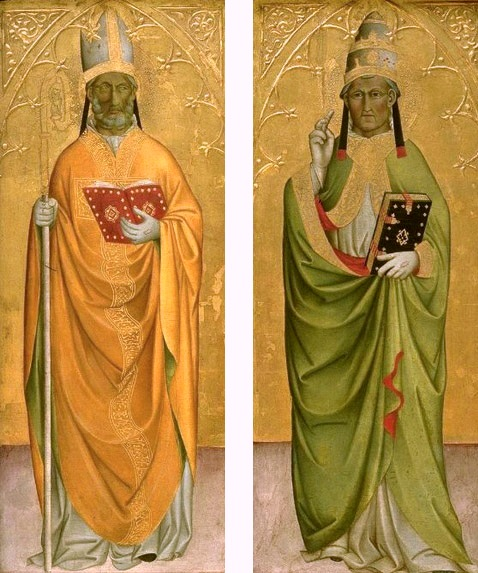
Cennino Cennini, Beatified Bishop and Beatified Pope, Gemäldegalerie, Berlin

Cennino d'Andrea Cennini (Italian: [tʃenˈniːno danˈdrɛːa tʃenˈniːni]; c. 1360 – before 1427) was an Italian painter influenced by Giotto. He was a student of Agnolo Gaddi in Florence. Gaddi trained under his father, called Taddeo Gaddi, who trained with Giotto. He is remembered mainly for having authored Il libro dell'arte.

== Life ==
Cennini was born in Colle di Val d'Elsa, present-day Tuscany. After training as an artist with Agnolo Gaddi in Florence he worked at the court of Francesco Novello da Carrara in Padua for some years before apparently returning to Colle di Val d'Elsa.

His book Il libro dell'arte is a "how to" on late Medieval and early Renaissance painting, and it was erroneously claimed to have been written in 1437, although it is much older than that. It contains information on pigments, brushes, drawing, panel painting, the art of fresco, painting on fabrics and casting, amongst other techniques and tricks. Theophilus (Roger of Helmerhausen), in his treatise On Divers Arts (1125), mentions oil painting, and so does Cennini, in passing. These mentions were important for dispelling a myth, propagated by Giorgio Vasari and Karel Van Mander, that oil painting was invented by Jan van Eyck. Il libro dell'arte was finally published in Rome several centuries after being written, in 1821, by Giuseppe Tambroni.

The dates of Cennini's life are highly speculative. It is often falsely assumed that he was alive in 1437 because that date appears on the earliest of the four extant copies of his manuscript. However, an administrative document from Colle di Val d'Elsa dated 1427 probably refers to his son; if this is the case then the document makes it clear that Cennini was dead by this time. The book was probably written in the 1390s. The techniques Cennini describes range from ones which were already in use in the 13th century to ones which were innovative in the late fourteenth century. However, there is no evidence in his writing of developments in oil painting taking place in the early 15th century, suggesting that his book was written not long after the turn of the century.

The extent to which Cennini intended to provide a practical handbook for the apprentice painter is disputed. Some scholars believe that his book was a presentation book or a guild book instead. Along with technical methods, Cennini offered advice on the sort of lifestyle to which a young painter should subscribe.

Your life should be arranged just as if you were studying theology, or philosophy, or other disciplines, that is to say, eating and drinking moderately, at least twice a day, electing digestible and wholesome dishes, and light wines; saving and sparing your hand, preserving it from such strains as heaving stones, crowbars, and many other things which are bad for your hand, from giving them a chance to weary it. There is another cause which, if you indulge it, can make your hand so unsteady that it will waver more, and flutter far more, than leaves do in the wind, and this is indulging too much in the company of women.

According to Victoria Finlay, the infamous UK forger Eric Hebborn was greatly influenced by Cennino Cennini. Citing Hebborn's The Art Forger's Handbook, Finlay writes that he "used and adapted Cennino's advice extensively – preparing panels, tinting papers different colours, and making brand new works look as if they had been varnished some time before (by beating egg-white, left overnight and then applying it with a brush), just as the master advised."

== Editions and translations ==
- Cennini, Cennino (1821). Giuseppe Tambroni (ed.). Trattato della Pittura. Rome: Torchi di Paolo Salviucci.
- Cennini's Treatise of Painting was translated into English by Mary Philadelphia Merrifield in 1844.
- Broecke, L. (tr. and ed.) (2015) Cennino Cennini, Il libro dell'arte. London: Archetype. [Transcription and English translation].
- Frezzato, F. (ed.) (2006) Cennino Cennini, Il Libro dell’Arte, Vicenza: Neri Pozza. [Edition of the Italian]; his Cennino Cennini's Il Libro dell'Arte. A new English translation and commentary with Italian Transcription is the standard modern translation.
- Thompson, D. V., Jr. (1932–3) Cennino d’Andrea Cennini da Colle di Val d’Elsa. Il Libro dell’Arte, 2 vols. New Haven: Yale University Press. [Edition and English translation]
- Thompson, D. V., Jr. (1933) The Craftsman’s Handbook ‘Il Libro dell’ Arte’ by Cennino d’A. Cennini, New Haven: Yale University Press. [Reprint of the English translation volume only of the above: Dover Publications, New York, 1960].

In the 1970s, Boskovits established a small oeuvre for Cennini, which has been confirmed by later scholarship. This includes frescoes in the church of San Lucchese in Poggibonsi and a panel painting depicting the birth of the Virgin in the Museo Comunale in Colle di Val d'Elsa. The two paintings pictured above were added to the corpus at a later date.

== Sources ==
- Boskovits, M. (1973) 'Cennino Cennini – Pittore nonconformista', Mitteilungen des Kunsthistorischen Institutes in Florenz, 17, pp. 201–222.
- Deuchler, F. (2017) Quintilian: Nachantike Spuren der "Institutio oratoria"; Mutmaßungen über das "Libro dell'Arte" von Cennini; Notate zu Sulzers "Theorie". Berne: Peter Lang.
- Löhr, W.-D., et al. (Ed.): Fantasie und Handwerk. Cennino Cennini und die Tradition der toskanischen Malerei von Giotto bis Lorenzo Monaco. Exhibition catalogue, Gemäldegalerie Staatliche Museen zu Berlin, Hirmer Verlag, München 2008, ISBN 978-3-7774-4115-3.
- Skaug, E. '“Cenniniana: Notes on Cennino Cennini and his Treatise”', Arte Cristiana 754. An International Review of Art History and Liturgical Arts, 81.1-2, pp. 15–22.

== Sources and external links ==
- Encyclopædia Britannica
- Works by Cennino Cennini at Open Library
- The text of Il libro dell'arte
- Cennini on art and imagination
