= Merrifield =

Merrifield may refer to:

== Places ==
- Merrifield, Minnesota, US
- Merrifield, Virginia, US
- Merrifield, a village in Devon, England
- Merrifield Children's Unit, a former psychiatric institution in Somerset, England
- Merrifield, a residential development in the City of Hume (northern fringe of Melbourne) in Victoria, Australia

== Other uses ==
- Merrifield (system on chip), code name for an Intel Atom system on chip platform

== See also ==
- Category:Merrifield family
