= Giovanni Battista Salvi da Sassoferrato =

Italian painter (1609–1685)

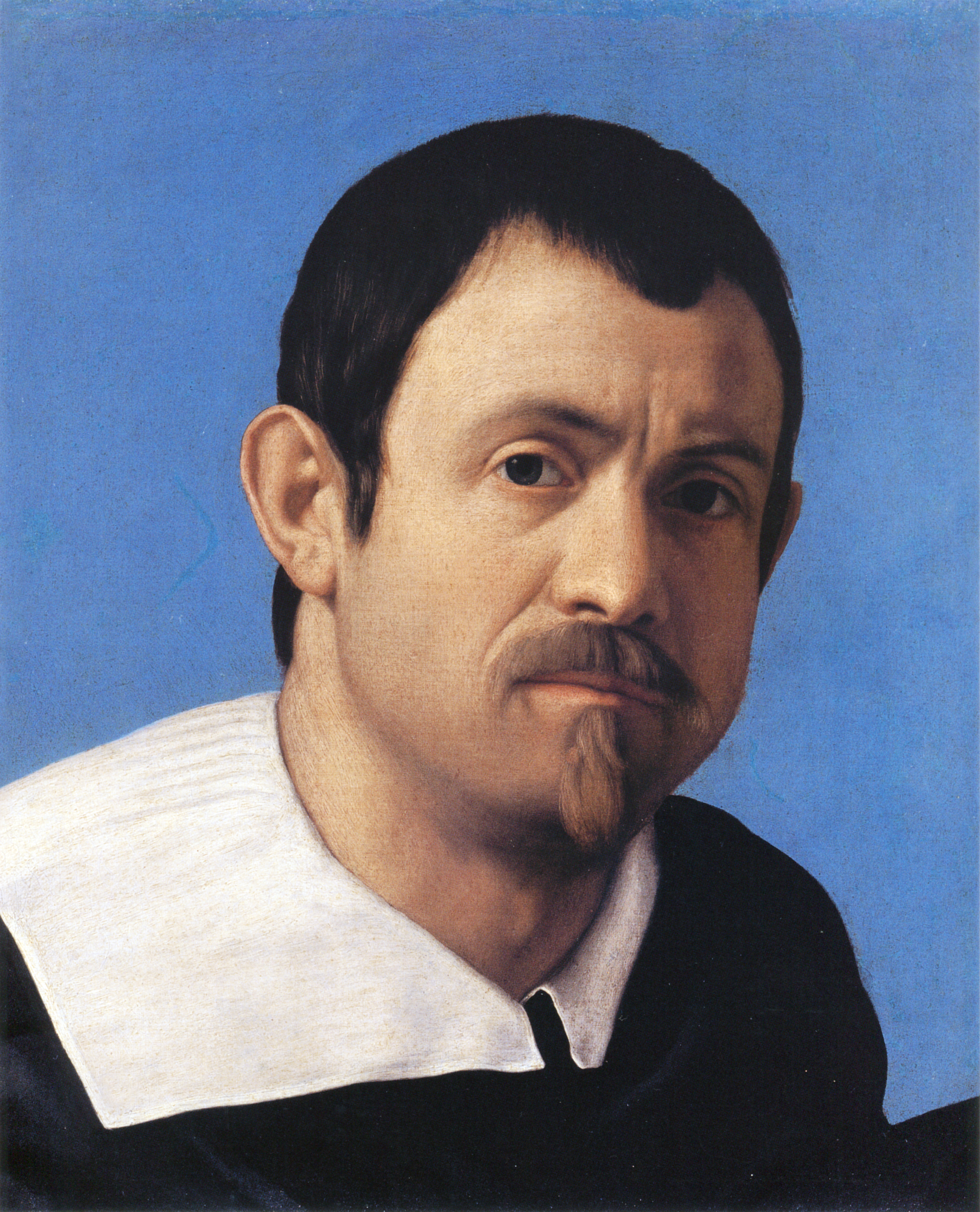
- Self-portrait from the Uffizi
- Born: 25 August 1609; Sassoferrato, Papal States
- Died: 8 August 1685 (aged 75); Rome, Papal States
- Known for: Painting
- Notable work: The Virgin in Prayer (c. 1640–1650)
- Movement: Baroque

Giovanni Battista Salvi da Sassoferrato (25 August 1609 – 8 August 1685), also known as Giovanni Battista Salvi, was an Italian Baroque painter, known for his archaizing commitment to Raphael's style. He is often referred to only by the name of his birthplace, Sassoferrato.

== Biography ==
The details of Giovanni Battista Salvi's life are very limited. He was born in the small town of Sassoferrato in the Marche region of central Italy, halfway between Rome and Florence, east of the Apennines. Sassoferrato was apprenticed under his father, the painter Tarquinio Salvi; fragments of Tarquinio's work are still visible in the church of San Francesco in Sassoferrato. The rest of Giovanni's training is undocumented, but it is thought that he worked under the Bolognese painter Domenichino, a main apprentice of Annibale Carracci (c. 1580). Two other pupils of Carracci, Francesco Albani and Guido Reni, also influenced Sassoferrato. In Francis Russell's view, Reni was as much Sassoferrato's mentor as Domenichino was his master. His paintings also show the influence of Albrecht Dürer, Guercino, and above all Raphael. He appears to have also been influenced by Pierre Mignard, whom he may have met in Rome in the 1630s.

Few public commissions by Sassoferrato exist, and, like Carlo Dolci, he seems to have concentrated on producing multiple copies of various styles of devotional image for private patrons, a demand fuelled by the Counter-Reformation of the Catholic Church. On 15 April 1642, Olimpia Aldobrandini, Princess of Rossano, who became the wife of Prince Camillo Francesco Maria Pamphili, engaged him to paint a portrait to be sent to Naples. In the 1640s and 1650s, portrait painting formed a large part of his work in Rome. In this period he executed portraits of Cardinal Francesco Angelo Rapaccioli (1643–4; Sarasota, John and Mable Ringling Museum of Art), Monsignor Ottaviano Prati (c. 1650; Rome, Palazzo Barberini) and Cardinal Ottoboni (c. 1652; Padua, Musei Civici di Padova). His talent for portrait painting was evidently appreciated, especially by ecclesiastical clients (Blunt and Cooke).

Until the early 20th century, Sassoferrato’s portrait painting was thought to be limited to his Self-portrait (1664–70; Florence, Uffizi), a work of great emotional intensity. In 1643, Olimpia Aldobrandini engaged Sassoferrato to paint a canvas for the chapel of Santa Caterina in Santa Sabina, Rome, to replace a work by Raphael that had been lost. This, the Virgin of the Rosary, is perhaps Salvi’s best-known and most celebrated work. The composition is rigorously constructed in the form of an isosceles triangle, and the work demonstrates his painstaking craftsmanship and skilful use of brilliant colour. He produced few other altarpieces or large compositions, preferring to work on a smaller scale, mostly on sacred subjects, although he did occasionally paint mythological scenes.

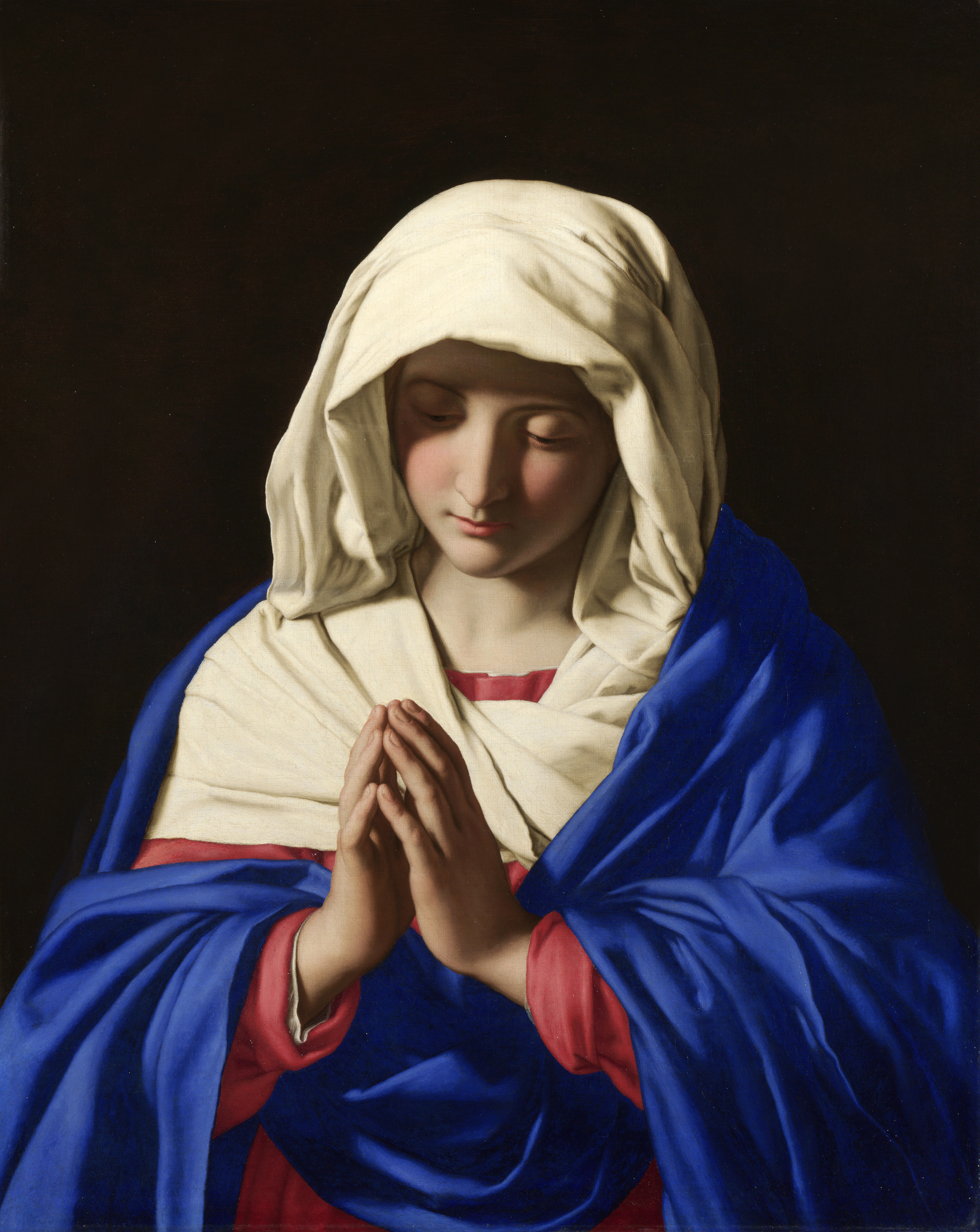
The Virgin in Prayer, oil on canvas, c. 1640–1650, National Gallery, London

From 1650 until his death, little is known of Sassoferrato’s activity. Presumably, he was employed in producing the numerous images of the Virgin, for which he became particularly known. The vogue for such images, stimulated by the Marian cult of the Counter-Reformation, obliged him to paint them in quantity and to keep a reserve stock to meet the ever-increasing demand. All his known images of the Virgin have now been catalogued, and, despite their quantity, they reveal a consistently high quality of execution. Sassoferrato was also a skilled copyist, following the common 17th-century practice of reproducing paintings by other masters. He often used the subjects of other works or details taken from them, sometimes modifying the composition or the dimensions. Thus, his Annunciation (1632–40; San Pietro, Perugia) is clearly based on part of an altarpiece painted by Raphael for San Francesco, Perugia (1500–03; Rome, Pinacoteca Vaticana). Apart from certain exceptions, such as the faithful copy (San Pietro, Perugia) of Raphael’s Entombment (1507; Rome, Galleria Borghese), Sassoferrato's copying style was highly free and individualistic, and he rather modified the original compositions or their dimensions than slavishly copied. Sassoferrato died in Rome on 8 August 1685. His will is dated 29 June of the same year.

== Critical assessment ==
Sassoferrato's work was held in high regard through to the mid-19th century. His paintings were sometimes believed to be contemporary with the school of Raphael. However, by the late 19th century, reaction against sweet devotional artwork was reinforced in England by the critical commentary of John Ruskin. The late 20th century saw a revival of interest in archaizing Italian Baroque painting, with Guido Reni leading the way in generating a surge of auction interest also in Sassoferrato. There are over three hundred works by Sassoferrato in public collections in 2006 throughout the world, including almost all of his extant drawings in the British Royal Collection at Windsor Castle.

== Gallery ==
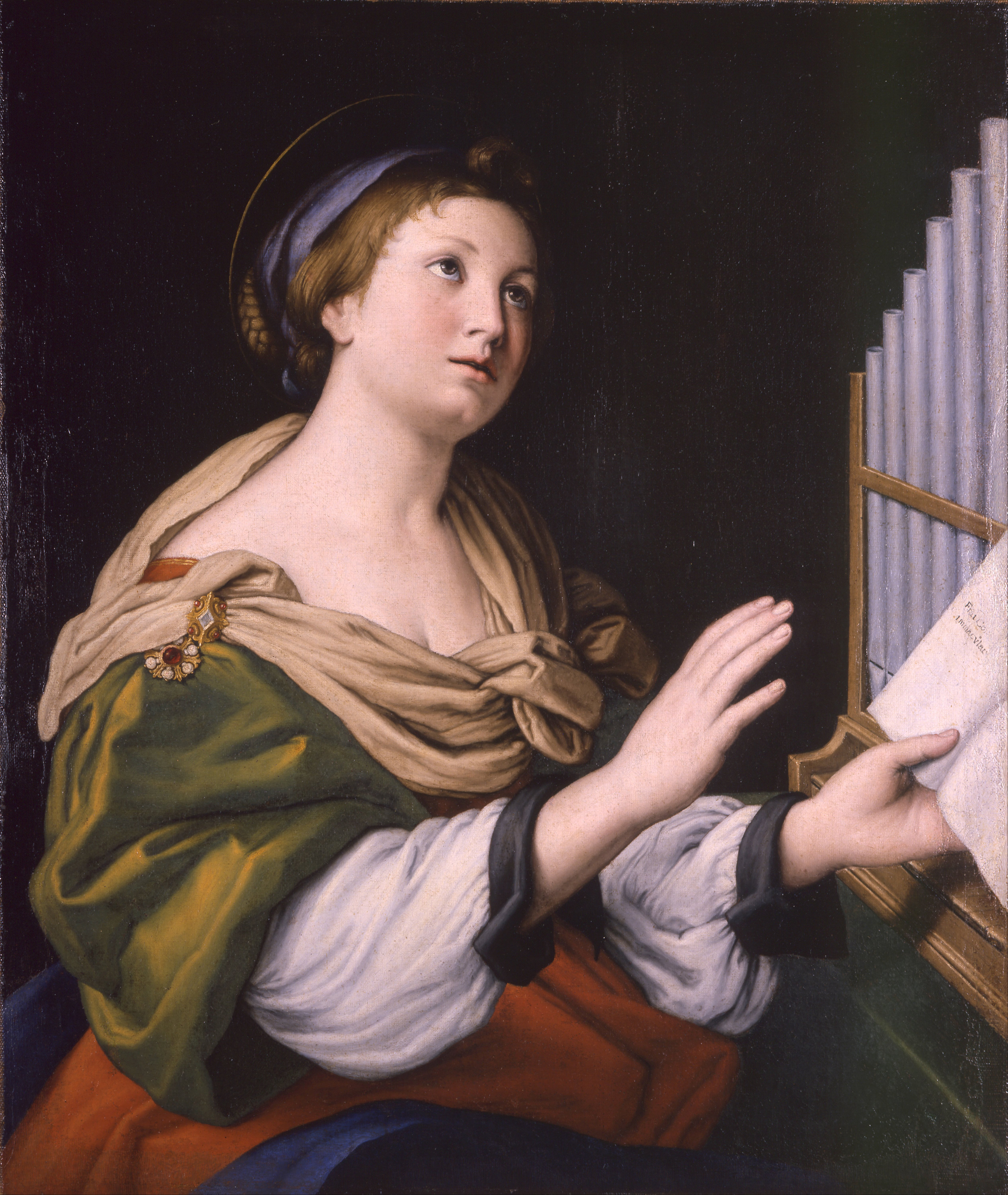
Saint Cecilia, Museo Poldi Pezzoli

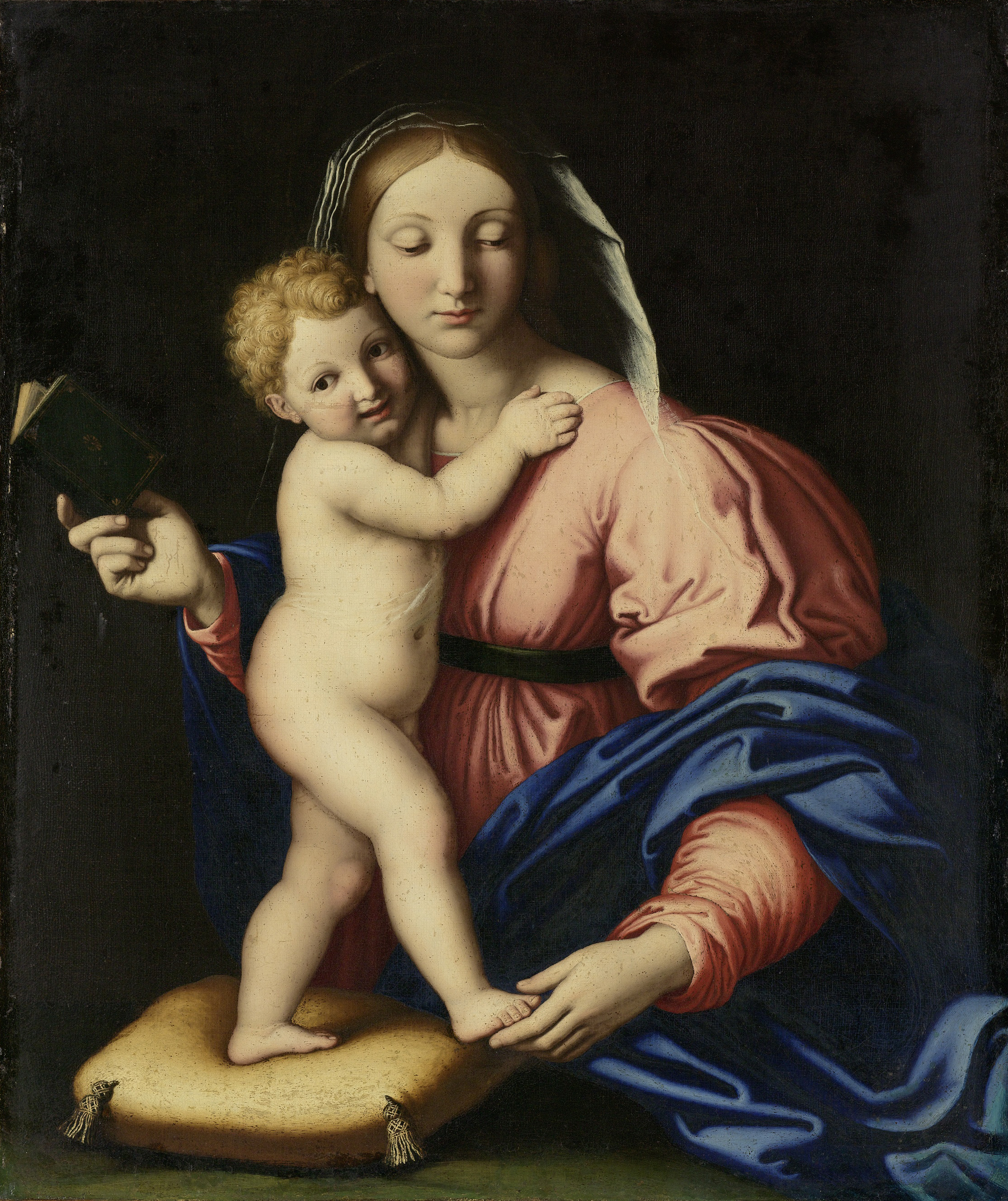
Madonna and Child, Rijksmuseum

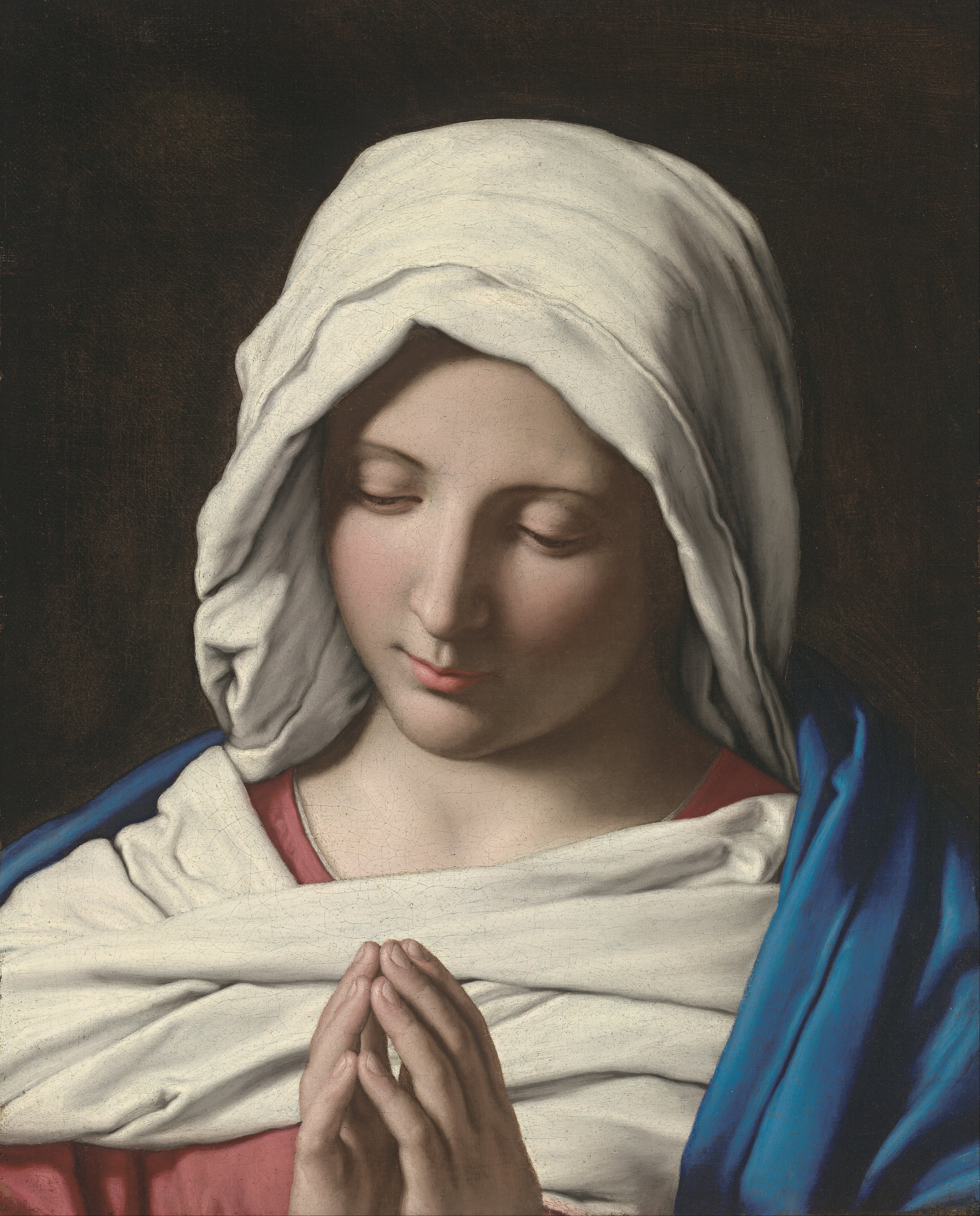
Madonna in Prayer, National Gallery of Victoria

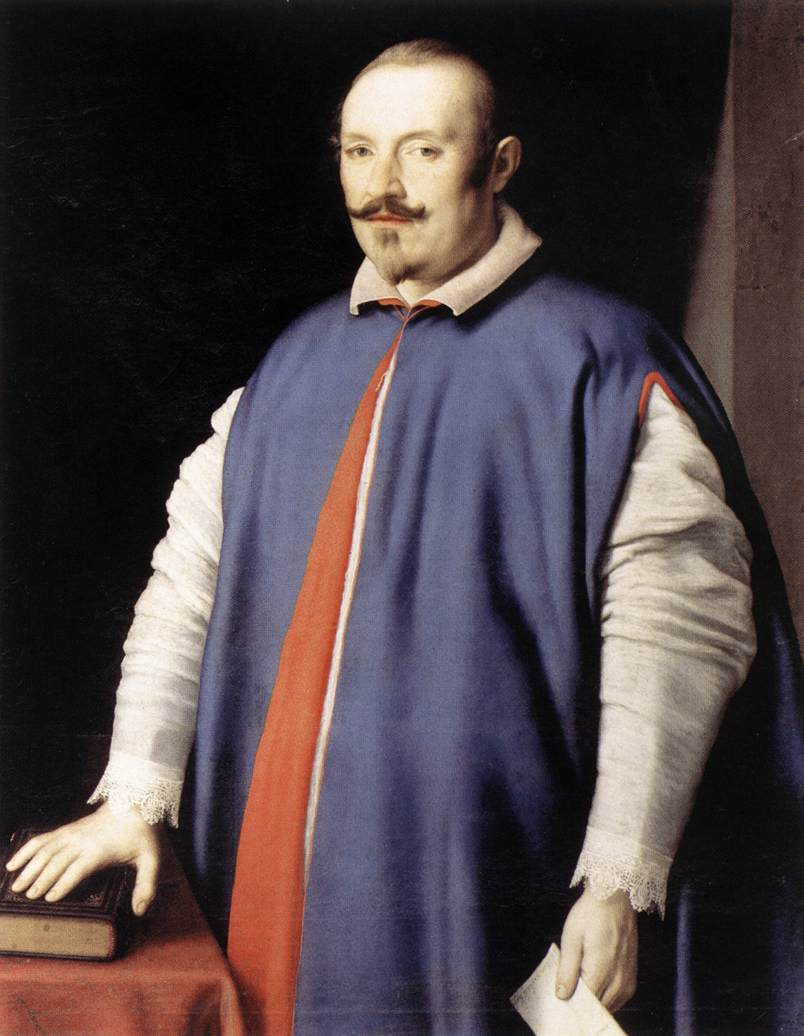
Ottaviano Prati, Galleria Nazionale d'Arte Antica

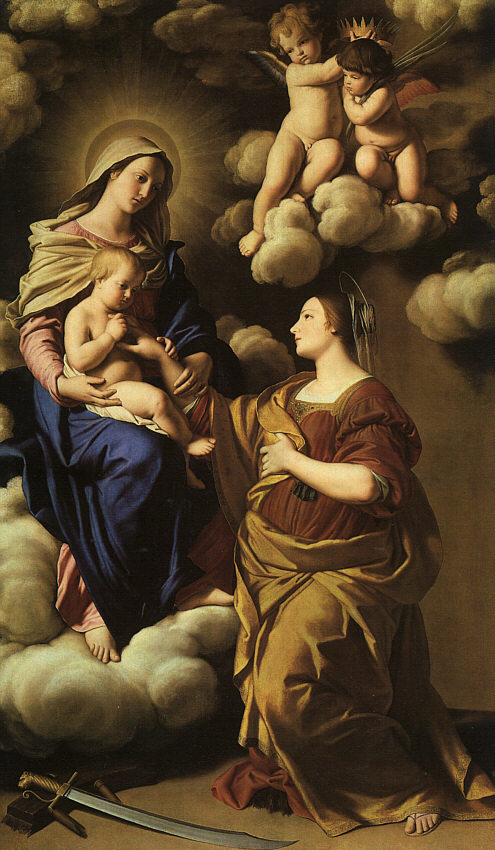
The Mystic Marriage of Saint Catherine of Alexandria, Wallace Collection

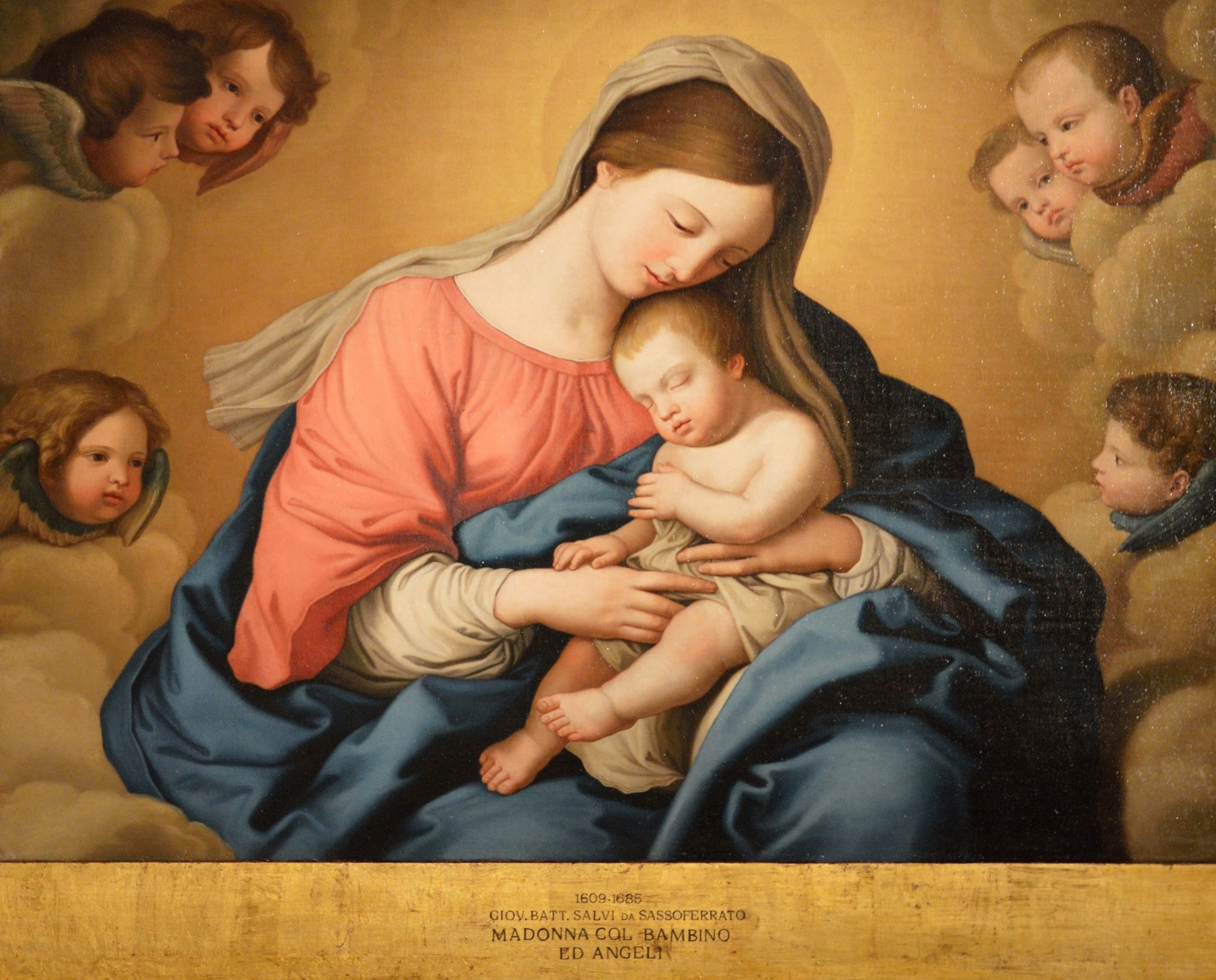
Madonna and Child with Angels, Galleria Nazionale d'Arte Antica

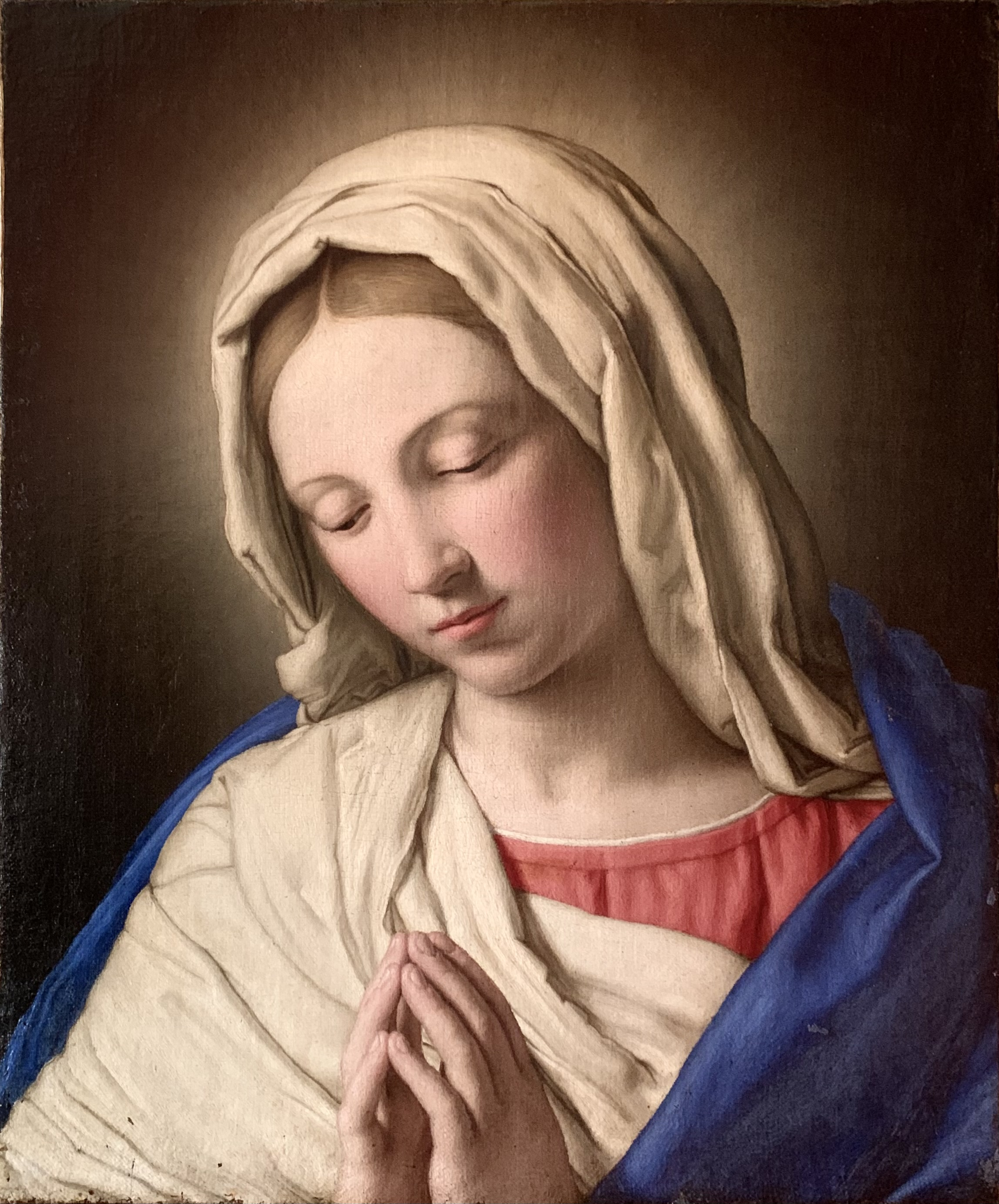
The Virgin in Prayer, Private Collection. 47 x 38.5 cm.

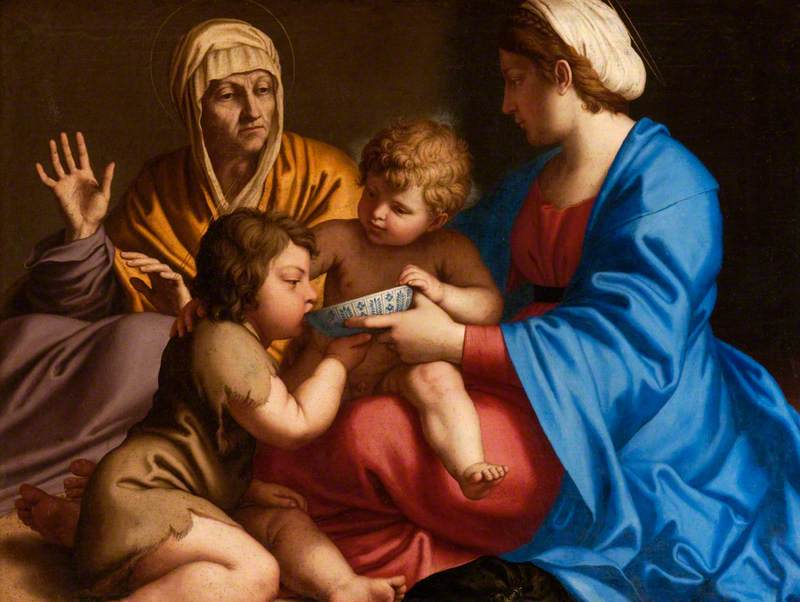
Virgin and Child with Saint Elisabeth and Child Baptist, Glasgow Museums

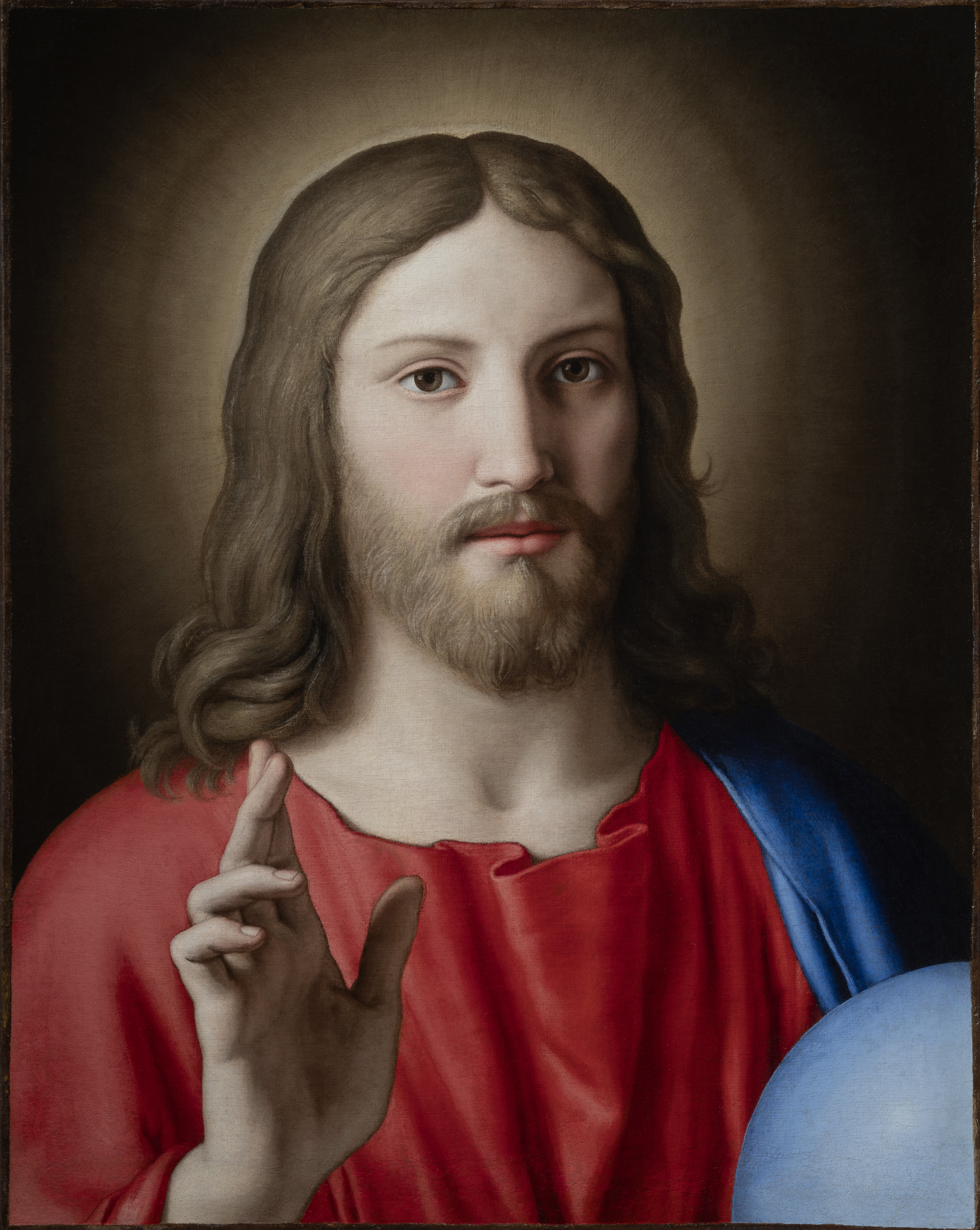
Salvator Mundi, Private Collection. 48 x 39 cm.

== Bibliography ==
- Serra, Luigi (1936). "SASSOFERRATO". Enciclopedia Italiana (in Italian). Rome: Istituto dell'Enciclopedia Italiana.
- Russell, Francis (1977). "Sassoferrato and his Sources: a Study of Seicento Allegiance". The Burlington Magazine. 119 (895): 694–700. JSTOR 878998.
- Mancini, Tiziana (2003). "Sassoferrato [Salvi, Giovanni Battista]". Grove Art Online. Oxford University Press. doi:10.1093/gao/9781884446054.article.T076114.
