= Frederick Merrifield =

English barrister

Frederick Merrifield (1831 – 28 May 1924, Brighton) was an English barrister, entomologist and campaigner for women's suffrage.

Merrifield was a London attorney and clerk to the County Council of East Sussex.

An expert on Lepidoptera, he was especially interested in the effect of temperature on the colour and patterning of butterflies, rearing larvae and pupae in controlled temperature incubators and recording the effect on the colouration of adults. Examples of his very many scientific papers on this subject are (1890). Systematic temperature experiments on some Lepidoptera in all their stages. Trans. Entomol. Soc. London, 131-59 and (1891). Conspicuous effects on the markings and colouring of Lepidoptera caused by exposure of the pupae to different temperature conditions. Trans. Entomol. Soc. London, 155-67. He was President of the Royal Entomological Society (1905-1906).

Frederick was a Liberal and attended meetings of the Reform League that campaigned for better 'representation of the working classes'. He and his wife Maria Merrifield (nee de Gaudrion, 1825-1894) were part of establishing the Brighton branch of the National Society for Women's Suffrage in 1872, along with Henry Fawcett and Millicent Fawcett and with Mrs Merrifield as treasurer. Frederick was also a member of the National Association for the Repeal of the Contagious Diseases Acts since the legislation adversely affected women. With his younger daughter, Flora Merrifield, he campaigned for women's suffrage in Lewes and was present at the formation of the Brighton branch of the Men's League for Women's Suffrage. After his death, he was described as being 'from the beginning...a stout supporter of women's suffrage'.

Frederick Merrifield's mother was the author and artist, Mary Philadelphia Merrifield and he assisted her with her work, along with his elder brother, the mathematician Charles Watkins Merrifield. In 1877, he was the chair of Brighton's School of Art, which later developed into the University of Brighton.

Frederick's eldest daughter Margaret de Gaudrion Verrall (1857-1916) became a spiritualist medium. Frederick was also a spiritualist, but lost respect for the medium Daniel Dunglas Home after claiming to have observed him cheat. At a séance in the house of the solicitor John Snaith Rymer in Ealing in July 1855, Merrifield observed that a "spirit-hand" was a false limb attached on the end of Home's arm. Merrifield also claimed to have observed Home use his foot in the séance room.
