= Lester Levern Merrifield =

Lester Levern Merrifield (February 1, 1921 – January 15, 2000) was an American orthodontist known for his contributions in developing the Tweed-Merrifield philosophy with the Edgewise brackets during the 1950s. He was a previous President of Charles H. Tweed Foundation.

== Life ==
He was born in 1921 in Dill City, Oklahoma. He received his high school education from William L. Sayre High School and went to Oklahoma State University–Stillwater to get his degree in agriculture. He then taught vocational agriculture in the town for few years. In 1942, he decided to pursue his dental education at Texas A&M University Baylor College of Dentistry, Texas and graduated from there in 1946. He opened his first practice in Chickasha, Oklahoma. After that he pursued his education in Orthodontics from University of Missouri–Kansas City School of Dentistry.

In 1951 he entered United States Air Force as a Captain and transferred to Amarillo Air Force Base. He eventually completed his tour duty in 1953. After that he moved to Kay County, Oklahoma where he started an Orthodontic Practice with his brother Vernon Merrifield. He worked in his private practice for 50 years.

== Career ==
Dr. Merrifield enrolled himself in the Advanced edgewise technique course at the Tweed Foundation in 1953. Dr. Charles H. Tweed invited Dr. Merrifield to become a Co-instructor at the institution and later the Director of the Institution. When Dr. Tweed died in 1970, Dr. Merrifield assumed the chairmanship of the board. His contribution lead him to give lectures twice a year at the Tweed Foundation for more than 40 years.

He was married to Jan Marlene McVicker.

== Awards and positions ==
- Tweed Foundation Distinguished Service Award
- Martin Dewey Award
- Oklahoma Dental Society, President
- Albert H. Ketcham Award, 1989
