= Margaret Verrall =

English parapsychologist (1857–1916)

Margaret de Gaudrion Verrall (née Merrifield; 21 December 1857 – 2 July 1916) was a classical scholar and lecturer at Newnham College, Cambridge. Much of her life and research was concerned with the study of parapsychology, mainly in order to examine how psychic abilities might demonstrate the abilities, breadth and power of the human mind. She began to exhibit and develop psychic abilities herself around 1901, and became both a recipient and analyst of many cross-correspondences produced by psychics, most notably the Palm Sunday scripts.

== Life ==
Born Margaret de Gaudrion Merrifield at 4 Dorset Gardens, Brighton in 1857, she was the eldest of two daughters born to Frederick Merrifield (1831-1924) and Maria Angélique de Gaudrion (1824/5–1894). Her father was a clerk to the County Councils of East and West Sussex. Her mother was of French origin and the daughter of Colonel V.P.J. de Gaudrion, said to be from an old French family.

She entered Newnham College (then Hall) in 1875 intending to study political science, but was persuaded to take a Classical Tripos by a friend, and passed with second-class honours in 1880. She was appointed a lecturer at the college the same year.

She married fellow classical scholar Arthur Woollgar Verrall on 17 Jun 1882, and they went on to have two daughters, Helen, born in 1883, and Phoebe, born in 1888, who died in 1890. Arthur Verrall was the first Edward VII professor of English Literature, but Margaret remained active in lecturing and research even after her marriage, somewhat unusually for middle-class woman in that period. She collaborated with her husband on some work, notably the text of Pausanias for the Mythology and Monuments of Ancient Athens, published jointly with colleague Jane Harrison in 1890. She edited some of his lectures after his death. It was said that both the Verralls were supporters of the Liberal Party at a time when Cambridge was a staunchly Tory supporting area, but the couple did not find that to be a barrier to being accepted by the local community. Margaret was a member of the National Union of Women's Suffrage Societies and her parents, sister, Flora de Gaudrion Merrifield, and sister-in-law, Marian Verrall, were all suffragist campaigners. However, it appears that Margaret was not actively a Suffragist

She was a member of the Ladies Dining Society, a private women's dining and discussion club that had been established by Louise Creighton and Kathleen Lyttelton in 1890.

Between 1914-1915, Margaret was the Secretary of the Cambridge University Hospitality Committee. The committee was formed to make arrangements for refugee Belgian students coming to Cambridge to continue their studies (often with their own professors). Her knowledge of French was undoubtedly useful in this work, but it petered out as the students drifted off into war service or to the front lines. This work was remembered at her burial in 1916, which was attended by leading members of the Belgian University Committee who contributed a wreath inscribed 'Le corps professorial Belge reconnaissant.'

She died of cancer on the 2 July 1916, at her home, 5 Selwyn Gardens, Cambridge.

== Research into parapsychology ==
Margaret joined the Society for Psychical Research in February 1889, and became an interested and active member. She wrote about her own experiments on a number of subjects, including thought-transference, crystal-gazing and later more famous articles on automatic writing. She became a member of the Council in, and also acted as a proof reader for the Proceedings of the Society on their Committee of Reference from 1904, reviewing all papers submitted for publication.

Her first experiments with thought-transference were completed in collaboration with her four year old daughter Helen, and submitted anonymously to the journal in March 1889. She presented her first paper to the Society in 1895, based on her experiences of 5 years of guessing cards, and trying to find the root of successfully perceiving them. For many years however, she had no success at automatic writing or table-tilting, however, by 1906, when she published on automatic writing, she had begun garnering some success every couple of weeks.
