= Miss Eveleen Tennant =

Painting by John Everett Millais

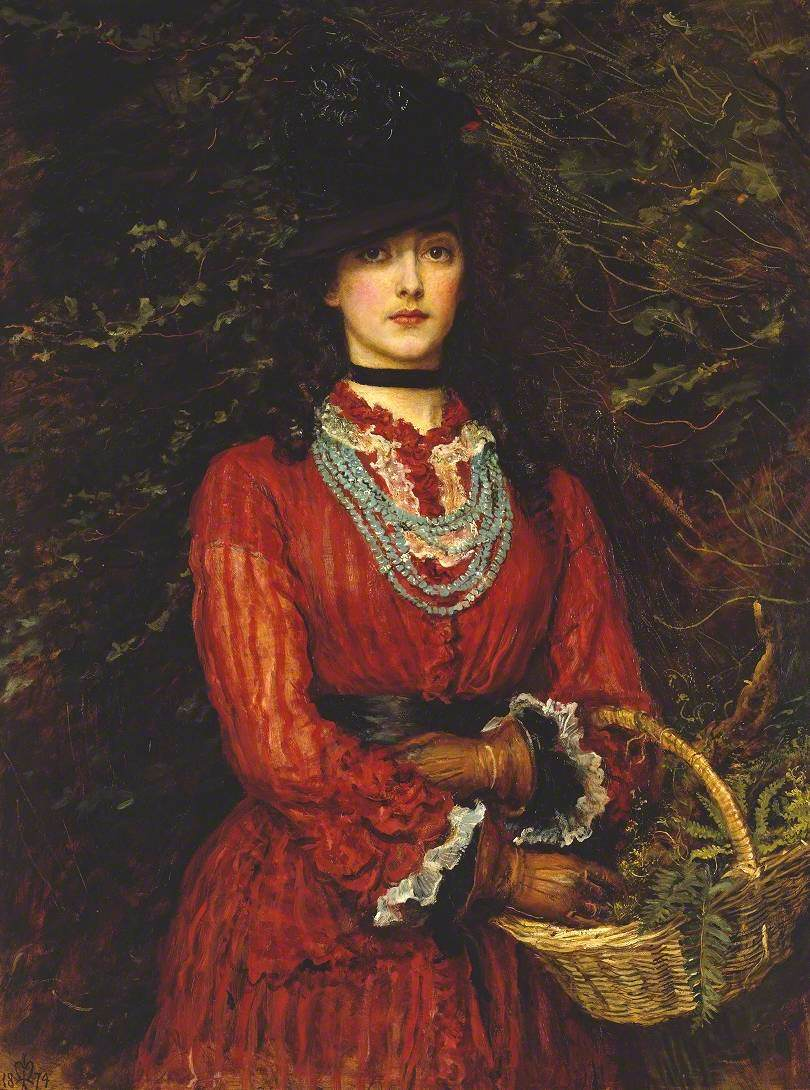
- Artist: John Everett Millais
- Year: 1874
- Type: Oil on canvas, portrait painting
- Dimensions: 107.9 cm × 80 cm (42.5 in × 31 in)
- Location: Tate Britain, London

Miss Eveleen Tennant is an 1874 portrait painting by the British artist John Everett Millais. It depicts the English photographer Eveleen Myers. She is shown in a red dress carrying a wicker basket of ferns againsta woodland backdrop. Self-taught, she took up photography in the later Victorian era. She was the daughter of the landowner and politician Charles Tennant and sister of the artist Dorothy Tennant. In 1880 she married the academic Frederic William Henry Myers. Millais also painted her sister Dorothy for his 1875 painting No!.

Millais had established himself as a leading portaitist following his earlier emergence through the Pre-Raphaelite Brotherhood. The painting was displayed at the Royal Academy Exhibition of 1875 held at Burlington House in London. It was subsequently presented to the nation in 1941and now is part of the collection of Tate Britain in Pimlico

== See also ==
- List of paintings by John Everett Millais

== Bibliography ==
- Ash, Russell. Victorian Masters of Their Art. Pavilion, 1999.
- Clarke, Meaghan. Fashionability, Exhibition Culture and Gender Politics. Taylor & Francis, 2020.
