= Frederic W. H. Myers =

English poet and essayist (1843–1901)

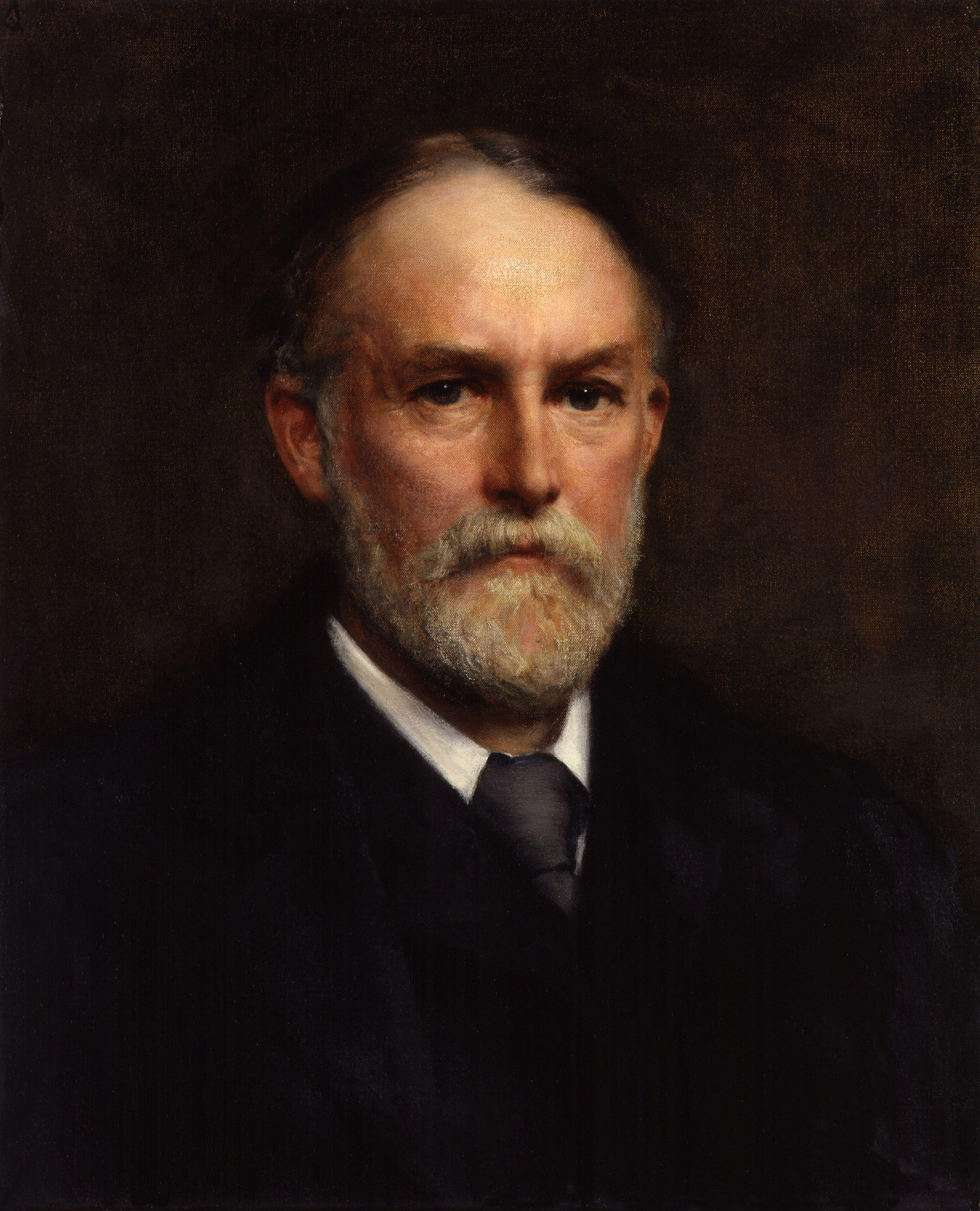
- Portrait by William Clarke Wontner c. 1896
- Born: 6 February 1843; Keswick, Cumberland, England
- Died: 17 January 1901 (aged 57); Rome, Italy
- Occupations: Psychical researcher, writer

Frederic William Henry Myers (6 February 1843 – 17 January 1901) was a British poet, classicist, philologist, and a founder of the Society for Psychical Research. Myers' work on psychical research and his ideas about a "subliminal self" were influential in his time, but have not been accepted by the scientific community.

== Early life ==
Myers was born on 6 February 1843 at St John's parsonage, Keswick, Cumberland, the son of Revd Frederic Myers (1811–1851) and his second wife Susan Harriet Myers nee Marshall (1811–1896). He was a brother of poet Ernest Myers (1844–1921) and of Dr. Arthur Thomas Myers (1851–1894). His maternal grandfather was the wealthy industrialist John Marshall (1765–1845).

Myers was educated at Cheltenham College and at Trinity College, Cambridge, where he received a B.A. in 1864, and university prizes, including the Bell, Craven, Camden and Chancellor's Medal, though he was forced to resign the Camden medal for 1863 after accusations of plagiarism. He was a Fellow of Trinity College from 1865 to 1874 and college lecturer in classics from 1865 to 1869. In 1872 he became an Inspector of schools.

In 1867, Myers published a long poem, St Paul, which includes the words of the hymn Hark what a sound, and too divine for hearing. This was followed in 1882 by The Renewal of Youth and Other Poems. He also wrote books of literary criticism, in particular, Wordsworth (1881) and Essays, Classical and Modern (in two volumes, 1883), which included an essay on Virgil.

== Personal life ==
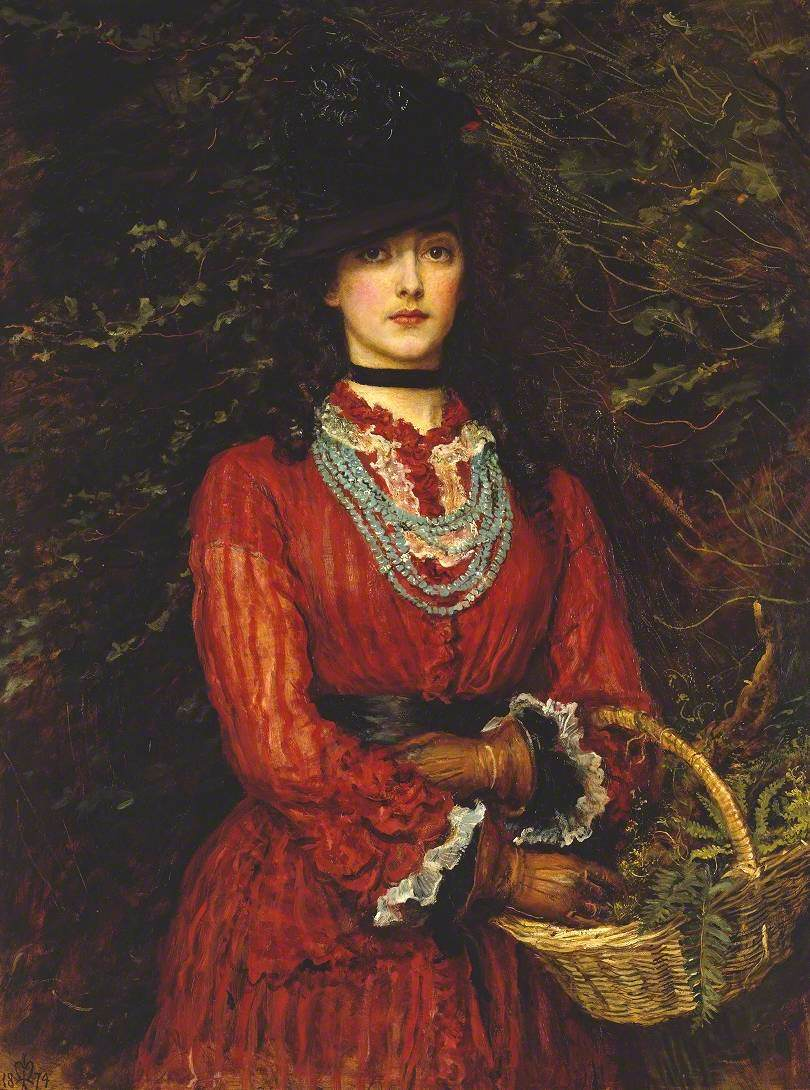
Miss Eveleen Tennant by John Everett Millais

As a young man, Myers was involved in homosexual relationships with Arthur Sidgwick, the poet John Addington Symonds, and possibly Lord Battersea. He later fell in love with Annie Eliza, the wife of his cousin Walter James Marshall. Myers' relationship with his cousin's wife has been questioned by different researchers to be sexual or Platonic. Annie committed suicide in September 1876 by drowning.

The British writer on the occult Richard Cavendish commented: "According to his own statement, he [Myers] had very strong sexual inclinations, which he indulged. These would seem to have been mainly homosexual in his youth, but in later life, he was said to be wholly heterosexual." In 1880, Myers married Eveleen Tennant (1856–1937), daughter of Charles Tennant and Gertrude Tennant. They had two sons, the elder the novelist Leopold Hamilton Myers (1881–1944), and a daughter. English author Ronald Pearsall suggested that Myers had sexual interests in young lady mediums, writing "[I]t is certainly true that Myers's interest in young lady mediums was not solely due to their spiritualistic talents."

The researcher Trevor H. Hall argued that Myers had an affair with the medium Ada Goodrich Freer. However, Trevor Hamilton dismissed this and suggested that Freer was simply using her acquaintance with Myers to gain status in the psychical research movement. John Grant has suggested that Myers was a womaniser who was easily duped and "probably seduced" by Freer."

Biographer Bart Schultz wrote that "Myers was suspected of all manner of sexual quirks and it was alleged that he looked upon psychical research as giving him opportunities for voyeurism." He also noted the odd behaviour of Myers, such as insisting to be with Edmund Gurney with his bride on their Honeymoon even against strong protest from the bride.

A relationship between eroticism and Myer's interest in psychical research was examined by Professor of Philosophy Jeffrey J. Kripal.

Biographer Trevor Hamilton has defended Myer's against the allegations of sexual misconduct.

== Psychical research ==
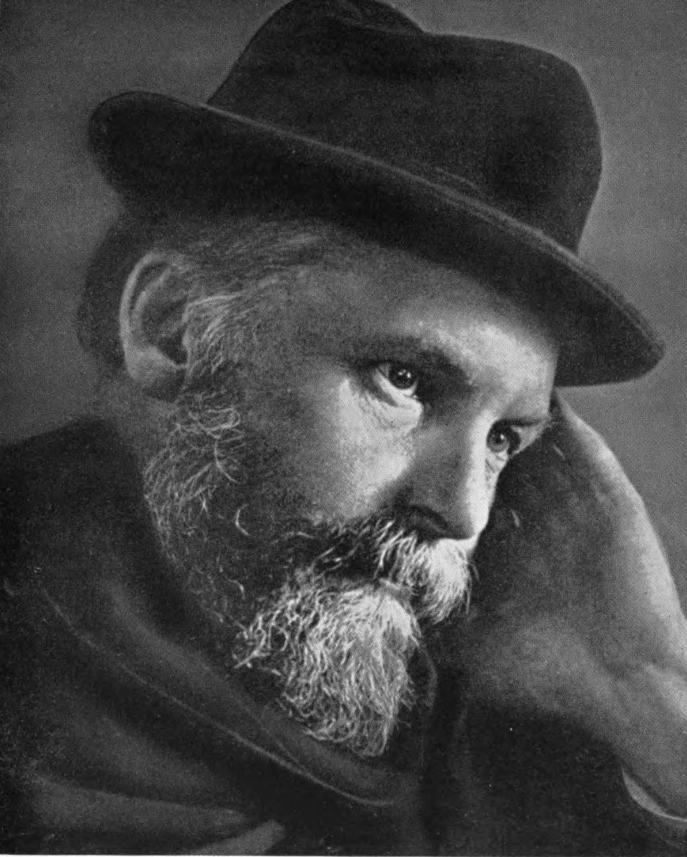
Myers

Myers was interested in psychical research and was one of the founding members of the Society for Psychical Research (SPR) in 1883. He became the President in 1900. Myers psychical ideas and theory of a subliminal self did not impress contemporary psychologists. Psychologists who shared an interest in psychical research such as Théodore Flournoy and William James were influenced by Myers. However, according to historian Janet Oppenheim "not even all Myer's colleagues at the SPR accepted his hypotheses."

Early SPR members like Myers and Henry Sidgwick hoped to cling to something spiritual through psychical research. Psychical researcher Eric Dingwall wrote regarding the early formation of the Society for Psychical Research, "Myers, among others... knew that the primary aim of the society was not objective experimentation but the establishment of telepathy."

British historian G.R. Searle described Myers as "having lost his Christian faith, sought a new kind of religion that could reassure him that death did not lead to extinction."

=== Mediums and psychics ===
In opposition to Richard Hodgson and Eleanor Mildred Sidgwick who held the view that many physical mediums were fraudulent, Myers believed that although many of these mediums cheated they could also produce genuine physical phenomena. According to Trevor Hamilton "Myers had no direct involvement in the exposure of physical fraud."

In the late 19th century Douglas Blackburn and George Albert Smith were endorsed as genuine psychics by Myers and Edmund Gurney. Smith even became an SPR member himself and the private secretary to the Honorary Secretary Gurney from 1883 to 1888. However, Blackburn later confessed to fraud. Blackburn called Gurney and Myers a "couple of credulous spiritualists" and wrote "we resolved that we should be doing the world a service by fooling them to the top of their bent, and then showing how easy a matter it was to 'take in' scientific observers."

Myers' 1884 essay Visible Apparitions with Gurney claimed a "personal experience" by a retired Judge Edmund Hornby involving a visitation from a spirit was true, but Joseph McCabe wrote that the story was a "jumble of inaccuracies" and "Sir E. Hornby was compelled to admit, that the story was entirely untrue."

In July 1895, Eusapia Palladino was invited to England to Myers' house in Cambridge for a series of investigations into her mediumship. According to reports by the investigators such as Richard Hodgson and magician John Nevil Maskelyne, all the phenomena observed in the Cambridge sittings were the result of trickery. Her fraud was so clever, according to Myers, that it "must have needed long practice to bring it to its present level of skill." However, despite the exposure of her fraud, Myers was convinced some of her phenomena was genuine.

Clinical neurologist Sebastian Dieguez has commented that Myers "was seriously duped by many people".

=== Phantasms of the living ===
Myers was the co-author of the two-volume Phantasms of the Living (1886) with Gurney and Frank Podmore which documented alleged sightings of apparitions. Myers wrote an introduction and concluding chapter. The two volumes consist of 701 cases of alleged spontaneous apparitional communications. It also explored a telepathic theory to explain such cases. Psychical researcher Thomas Walker Mitchell commented that "the chief aim of [the] book was to produce a cumulative quasi-statistical proof of telepathy." It was enthusiastically praised by psychologist William James as a "most extraordinary work...exhibiting untiring zeal in collecting facts, and patience in seeking to make them accurate." Both James and Myers are mentioned together in the book The Seven Purposes.

Some scholars, however, criticised Phantasms of the Living for its lack of written testimony and the time elapsed between the occurrence and the report of it being made. Some of the reports were analysed by the German hallucination researcher Edmund Parish (1861–1916) who concluded they were evidence for a dream state of consciousness, not the paranormal. Charles Sanders Peirce wrote a long criticism of the book arguing that no scientific conclusion could be reached from anecdotes and stories of unanalyzed phenomena. Peirce argued that the stories were "worthless, partly because of the uncertainty and error of the numerical data, and partly because the authors have been astonishingly careless in the admission of cases ruled out by the conditions of the argumentation."

A strong attack on the book was made by physiologist William Thierry Preyer. Mathematician Simon Newcomb noted that there were many possible natural explanations for the stories including "unconscious exaggeration; the faculty of remembering what is striking and forgetting what is not; illusions of sense, mistakes of memory; the impressions left by dreams; and, finally, deceit and trickery, whether intentional or unconscious." Because of all these possible factors that were not ruled out, he concluded "there is therefore no proof of telepathy in any of the wonders narrated in these volumes."

Alexander Taylor Innes attacked the book due to the stories lacking evidential substantiation in nearly every case. According to Innes the alleged sightings of apparitions were unreliable as they rested upon the memory of the witnesses and no contemporary documents had been produced, even in cases where such documents were alleged to exist. Edmund Gurney replied to the criticism, but "could only point to three cases that met Innes's requirements, one of which later turned out to be fraud".

Another major criticism of the book was that it endorsed the tests of the Creery Sisters as genuine evidence for telepathy. However, in 1887 two of the sisters had been detected in fraud, utilising a code of signals and the third sister confessed to using the signals in the experiments. The psychologist C. E. M. Hansel noted that the stories in Phantasms of the Living were not backed up by any corroborating evidence. Hansel concluded "none of the stories investigated has withstood critical examination."

Shane McCorristine in his book Spectres of the Self (2010), explores the criticisms of Phantasms of the Living in depth.

=== Human personality and its survival of bodily death ===
Myers wrote a small collection of essays, Science and a Future Life which was published in 1893. In 1903, after Myers's death, Human Personality and Its Survival of Bodily Death was compiled and published. This work comprises two large volumes at 1,360 pages in length and presents an overview of Myers's research into the unconscious mind. Myers believed that a theory of consciousness must be part of a unified model of mind which derives from the full range of human experience, including not only normal psychological phenomena but also a wide variety of abnormal and "supernormal" phenomena. In the book, Myers believed he had provided evidence for the existence of the soul and survival of personality after death. The book cites cases of automatic writing, hypnotism, mediumship, possession, psychokinesis, and telepathy.

In Human Personality and Its Survival of Bodily Death, Myers speculated on the existence of a deep region of the subconscious mind, which he termed the "subliminal self", which he believed could account for paranormal events. He also proposed the existence of a "metetherial world," a world of images lying beyond the physical world. He wrote that apparitions are not hallucinations but have a real existence in the metetherial world which he described as a dream-like world. Myers’ belief that apparitions occupied regions of physical space and had an objective existence was in opposition to the views of his co-authors Gurney and Podmore who wrote apparitions were telepathic hallucinations.

It was well received by parapsychologists and spiritualists, being described as "the Bible of British psychical researchers". Théodore Flournoy and William James both positively reviewed the book. It was negatively reviewed by psychologist George Stout who described the concept of the subliminal self as "baseless, futile, and incoherent." Andrew Lang and Gerald Balfour were unconvinced about some of Myers ideas. William McDougall in a detailed review for Mind also criticised the book. French psychologist Henri Delacroix commented that Myers "experimental metaphysics" was a failure. Psychologist G. T. W. Patrick criticised Myers concepts as a "metaphysical, not a psychological hypothesis."

Myers' book greatly impressed Aldous Huxley. In 1961, Human Personality was re-published as an abridged version with Huxley's foreword, in which he remarked "an amazingly rich, profound and stimulating book."

Strong praise for the book and a revival of interest in Myers' ideas appeared in the 2007 Irreducible Mind by Emily Williams Kelly, Alan Gauld and Bruce Greyson.

== Death ==
In each of 1898, 1899, and 1900 Myers had severe attacks of influenza and also developed Bright's disease. At the end of 1900 he travelled abroad to try to restore his health. He died of pneumonia in Rome on 17 January 1901. Myers was buried in the graveyard of St John's Church, Keswick, between his father's grave and a gateway into the garden of the house where he was born. He was survived by his wife. A memorial tablet to Myers was erected in Rome's Protestant cemetery.

== Publications ==
- The Renewal of Youth, and Other Poems (1882)
- Phantasms of the Living: Volume 1 (1886)
- Phantasms of the Living: Volume 2 (1886)
- Science and a Future Life: With Other Essays (1893)
- Human Personality and Its Survival of Bodily Death: Volume 1 (1903)
- Human Personality and Its Survival of Bodily Death: Volume 2 (1903)

== See also ==
- Cross-Correspondences
