= Society for Psychical Research =

UK nonprofit organisation

Coordinates: 51.49414°N 0.21036°W

- Abbreviation: SPR
- Formation: 1882; 144 years ago
- Legal status: Non-profit organisation
- Purpose: Parapsychology
- Location: 1 Vernon Mews, West Kensington, London W14 0RL
- Region served: Worldwide
- Members: Psi researchers
- President: Prof Chris Roe
- Main organ: SPR Council
- Website: www.spr.ac.uk

The Society for Psychical Research (SPR) is a nonprofit organisation in the United Kingdom. Its stated purpose is to understand events and abilities commonly described as psychic or paranormal. It describes itself as the "first society to conduct organised scholarly research into human experiences that challenge contemporary scientific models." It does not, however, since its inception in 1882, hold any corporate opinions: SPR members assert a variety of beliefs with regard to the nature of the phenomena studied.

== Origins ==
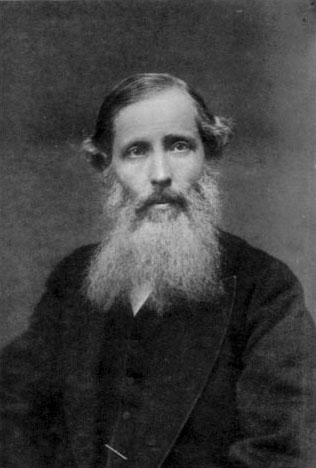
Henry Sidgwick, first president of the SPR

The Society for Psychical Research (SPR) originated from a discussion between journalist Edmund Rogers and the physicist William F. Barrett in autumn 1881. This led to a conference on 5 and 6 January 1882 at the headquarters of the British National Association of Spiritualists, at which the foundation of the Society was proposed. The committee included Barrett, Rogers, Stainton Moses, Charles Massey, Edmund Gurney, Hensleigh Wedgwood and Frederic W. H. Myers. The SPR was formally constituted on 20 February 1882 with philosopher Henry Sidgwick as its first president.

The SPR was the first organisation of its kind in the world, its stated purpose being "to approach these varied problems without prejudice or prepossession of any kind, and in the same spirit of exact and unimpassioned enquiry which has enabled science to solve so many problems, once not less obscure nor less hotly debated."

In 1882 Mary Everest Boole became the first female member of the SPR; however, she resigned after six months. Some other early members included the author Jane Barlow, the renowned chemist Sir William Crookes, physicist Sir Oliver Lodge, Nobel laureate Charles Richet, artist Lewis Charles Powles and psychologist William James.

Members of the SPR initiated and organised the International Congresses of Physiological/Experimental psychology.

Areas of study included hypnotism, dissociation, thought-transference, mediumship, Reichenbach phenomena, apparitions and haunted houses and the physical phenomena associated with séances. The SPR were to introduce a number of neologisms which have entered the English language, such as 'telepathy', which was coined by Frederic Myers.

The Society is run by a President and a Council of twenty members, and is open to interested members of the public to join. The organisation is based at 1 Vernon Mews, London, with a library and office open to members, and with large book and archival holdings in Cambridge University Library, Cambridgeshire, England. It publishes the peer-reviewed quarterly Journal of the Society for Psychical Research (JSPR), the irregular Proceedings and the magazine Paranormal Review. It holds an annual conference, regular lectures and two study days per year and supports the LEXSCIEN on-line library project.

== Research ==
The Society investigated "debatable phenomena designated by such terms as mesmeric, psychical, and Spritualistic." It sought to approach such questions "without prejudice or prepossession of any kind, and in the same spirit of exact and unimpassioned inquiry which has enabled Science to solve so many problems, once not less obscure nor less hotly debated."

=== Psychical research ===
Among the first important works was the two-volume publication in 1886, Phantasms of the Living, concerning telepathy and apparitions, co-authored by Gurney, Myers and Frank Podmore. This text, and subsequent research in this area, was received negatively by the scientific mainstream, though Gurney and Podmore provided a defence of the society's early work in this area in mainstream publications.

The SPR "devised methodological innovations such as randomized study designs" and conducted "the first experiments investigating the psychology of eyewitness testimony (Hodgson and Davey, 1887), [and] empirical and conceptual studies illuminating mechanisms of dissociation and hypnotism"

In 1894, the Census of Hallucinations was published which sampled 17,000 people. Out of these, 1,684 persons reported having experienced a hallucination of an apparition. Such efforts were claimed to have undermined "the notion of dissociation and hallucinations as intrinsically pathological phenomena".

The SPR investigated many spiritualist mediums such as Eva Carrière and Eusapia Palladino.

During the early twentieth century, the SPR studied a series of automatic scripts and trance utterances from a group of automatic writers, known as the cross-correspondences.

Famous cases investigated by the Society include Borley Rectory and the Enfield Poltergeist.

In 1912 the Society extended a request for a contribution to a special medical edition of its Proceedings to Sigmund Freud. Though according to Ronald W. Clark (1980) "Freud surmised, no doubt correctly, that the existence of any link between the founding fathers of psychoanalysis and investigation of the paranormal would hamper acceptance of psychoanalysis" as would any perceived involvement with the occult. Nonetheless, Freud did respond, contributing an essay titled "A Note on the Unconscious in Psycho-Analysis" to the Medical Supplement to the Proceedings of the Society for Psychical Research.

=== Exposures of fraud ===
Much of the society's early work involved investigating, exposing and in some cases duplicating fake phenomena. In the late 19th century, SPR investigations into séance phenomena led to the exposure of many fraudulent mediums.

Richard Hodgson distinguished himself in that area. In 1884, Hodgson was sent by the SPR to India to investigate Helena Blavatsky and concluded that her claims of psychic power were fraudulent. However, in 1985 the original finding of fraud was questioned and reinvestigated by the SPR researcher Vernon Harrison, president of the Royal Photographic Society and an expert at detecting forgery. Harrison determined that "As an investigator, Hodgson is weighed in the balances and found wanting. His case against Madame H. P. Blavatsky is not proven."

In 1886 and 1887 a series of publications by S. J. Davey, Hodgson and Sidgwick in the SPR journal exposed the slate writing tricks of the medium William Eglinton. Hodgson with his friend, S. J. Davey, had staged fake séances for educating the public (including SPR members). Davey gave sittings under an assumed name, duplicating the phenomena produced by Eglinton, and then proceeded to point out to the sitters the manner in which they had been deceived. Because of this, some spiritualist members such as Stainton Moses resigned from the SPR.

In 1891, Alfred Russel Wallace requested for the Society to properly investigate spirit photography. Eleanor Sidgwick responded with a critical paper in the SPR which cast doubt on the subject and discussed the fraudulent methods that spirit photographers such as Édouard Isidore Buguet, Frederic Hudson and William H. Mumler had utilised.

Due to the exposure of William Hope and other fraudulent mediums, Arthur Conan Doyle led a mass resignation of eighty-four members of the Society for Psychical Research, as they believed the Society was opposed to spiritualism. Science historian William Hodson Brock has noted that "By the 1900s most avowed spiritualists had left the SPR and gone back to the BNAS (the London Spiritualist Alliance since 1884), having become upset by the sceptical tone of most of the SPR's investigations."

== Criticism of the SPR ==
The Society has been criticized by both spiritualists and skeptics.

=== Criticism from spiritualists ===
Prominent spiritualists at first welcomed the SPR and cooperated fully, but relations soured when spiritualists discovered that the SPR would not accept outside testimony as proof, and the society accused some prominent mediums of fraud. Spiritualist Arthur Conan Doyle resigned from the SPR in 1930, to protest what he regarded as the SPR's overly restrictive standards of proof. Psychic investigator and believer in spiritualism Nandor Fodor criticised the SPR for its "strong bias" against physical manifestations of spiritualism.

=== Criticism from sceptics ===
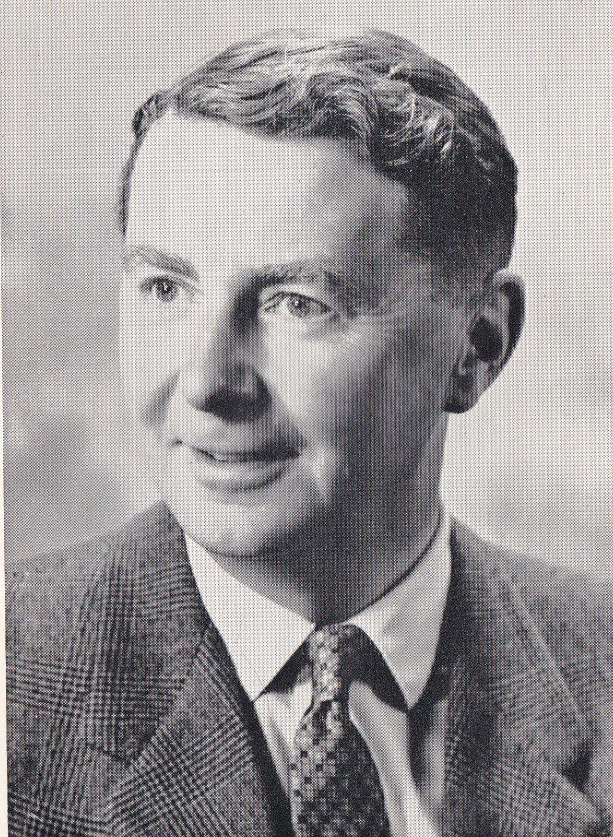
Trevor H. Hall, a critic of the SPR

Sceptics have criticised members of the SPR for having motives liable to impair scientific objectivity. According to SPR critics John Grant and Eric Dingwall (a member of the SPR), early SPR members such as Henry Sidgwick, Frederic W. H. Myers, and William Barrett hoped to cling to something spiritual through psychical research. Myers stated that “[T]he Society for Psychical Research was founded, with the establishment of thought-transference—already rising within measurable distance of proof—as its primary aim.” Defenders of the SPR have stated in reply that “a ‘will to believe’ in post-mortem survival, telepathy and other scientifically unpopular notions, does not necessarily exclude a ‘will to know’ and thus the capacity for thorough self-criticism, methodological rigour and relentless suspicion of errors.”

The sceptic and physicist Victor J. Stenger has written:

The SPR ... on occasion exposed blatant cases of fraud even their own credulous memberships could not swallow. But their journals have never succeeded in achieving a high level of credibility in the eyes of the rest of the scientific community. ... most articles usually begin with the assumption that psychic phenomena are demonstrated realities.

Ivor Lloyd Tuckett, an author of an early sceptical work on psychical research, wrote that although the SPR have collected some valuable work, most of its active members have "no training in psychology fitting them for their task, and have been the victims of pronounced bias, as sometimes they themselves have admitted." Trevor H. Hall, an ex-member of the Society for Psychical Research, criticised SPR members for their "credulous and obsessive wish... to believe." Hall also claimed SPR members "lack knowledge of deceptive methods."

Writer Edward Clodd asserted that the SPR members William F. Barrett and Oliver Lodge had insufficient competence for the detection of fraud and suggested that their spiritualist beliefs were based on magical thinking and primitive superstition. Clodd described the SPR as offering "barbaric spiritual philosophy", and characterised the language of SPR members as using such terms as "subliminal consciousness" and "telepathic energy," as a disguise for "bastard supernaturalism."

A 2004 psychological study involving 174 members of the Society for Psychical Research completed a delusional ideation questionnaire and a deductive reasoning task. The study found that "individuals who reported a strong belief in the paranormal made more errors and displayed more delusional ideation than skeptical individuals". The study also claims that reasoning abnormalities may have a causal role in the formation of paranormal belief.

Some sceptical members have resigned from the SPR. Eric Dingwall resigned and wrote "After sixty years' experience and personal acquaintance with most of the leading parapsychologists of that period I do not think I could name half a dozen whom I could call objective students who honestly wished to discover the truth. The great majority wanted to prove something or other: They wanted the phenomena into which they were inquiring to serve some purpose in supporting preconceived theories of their own."(1985)

== Presidents ==
The following is a list of presidents:

Society for Psychical Research
1882–84	Henry Sidgwick (1838–1900), Professor, Trinity College, Cambridge; Philosopher and Economist
1885–87	Balfour Stewart (1827–1887), Professor, Owens College, Manchester; Physicist
1888–92	Henry Sidgwick (→ 1882), Professor, Trinity College, Cambridge; Philosopher and Economist
1893	Arthur Balfour KG, OM, PC, DL (1848–1930), Politician, later Prime Minister; known for the Balfour Declaration
1894–95	William James (1842–1910) Professor, Harvard University; American Psychologist and Philosopher
1896–99	Sir William Crookes (1832–1919), Physical Chemist; discovered the element Thallium, invented the Crookes tube
1900	Frederic W. H. Myers (1843–1901), Fellow of Trinity College, Cambridge; Classicist and Philosopher
1901–03	Sir Oliver Lodge (1851–1940), Professor, University College, Liverpool; Physicist; developer of wireless telegraphy
1904	William F. Barrett FRS (1845–1926), Professor, Royal College of Science, Dublin; Experimental Physicist
1905	Charles Richet (1850–1935), Professor, Collège de France, Paris; French Physiologist, Nobel Prize in Medicine/Physiology 1913
1906–07	Gerald Balfour (1853–1945), Politician, brother of Arthur Balfour; Fellow of Trinity College, Cambridge
1908–09	Eleanor Mildred Sidgwick (1845–1936), Principal, Newnham College, Cambridge; Physicist
1910	Henry Arthur Smith (1848–1922), Barrister-at-Law, Middle Temple, London; Lawyer and author of legal treatises
1911	Andrew Lang (1844–1912), Fellow, Merton College, Oxford; Classicist and writer on folklore, mythology, and religion
1912	William Boyd Carpenter KCVO (1841–1918), Pastoral Lecturer, Theology, Cambridge; Bishop of Ripon
1913	Henri Bergson (1859–1941) Professor, Collège de France, Paris; Chair of Modern Philosophy; Nobel Prize, Literature 1927
1914	F. C. S. Schiller (1864–1937), Fellow, Corpus Christi College, Oxford; Philosopher
1915–16	Gilbert Murray (1866–1957), Regius Professor of Greek, University of Oxford; Classicist
1917–18	Lawrence Pearsall Jacks (1860–1955), Professor, Manchester College, Oxford; Philosopher and Theologian
1919	John William Strutt, 3rd Baron Rayleigh OM, PRS (1842–1919), Cavendish Professor, Trinity College, Cambridge; Physicist, Nobel Prize, Physics 1904
1920–21	William McDougall FRS (1871–1938), Professor, Duke University; Psychologist, founder J B Rhine Parapsychology Lab
1922	Thomas Walker Mitchell (1869–1944), Physician and Psychologist, Publisher of the British Journal of Medical Psychology 1920–35
1923	Camille Flammarion (1842–1925), founder and first president of the Société Astronomique de France, author of popular science and science fiction works
1924–25	John George Piddington (1869–1952), Businessman, John George Smith & Co., London
1926–27	Hans Driesch (1867–1941), Professor, Universitaet Leipzig; German Biologist and Natural Philosopher, performed first animal cloning 1885
1928–29	Sir Lawrence Evelyn Jones (1885–1955) Honorary Fellow, Balliol College, Oxford; Author
1930–31	Walter Franklin Prince (1863–1934), Clergyman
1932	Eleanor Mildred Sidgwick (→ 1908) and Oliver Lodge (→ 1901)
1933–34	Edith Lyttelton (born as Edith Balfour; 1865–1948), Writer
1935–36	C. D. Broad (1887–1971), Philosopher
1937–38	Robert Strutt, 4th Baron Rayleigh (1875–1947), Physicist
1939–41	H. H. Price (1899–1984), Philosopher
1942–44	Robert Henry Thouless (1894–1984), Psychologist
1945–46	George Nugent Merle Tyrrell (1879–1952), Mathematician
1947–48	William Henry Salter (1880–1969), Lawyer
1949	Gardner Murphy (1895–1979), Director of Research, Menninger Foundation, Topeka, Kansas; Psychologist
1950–51	Samuel Soal (1889–1975), Mathematician
1952	Gilbert Murray (→ 1915)
1953–55	F. J. M. Stratton (1881–1960), Astrophysicist, Professor in Cambridge University
1956–58	Guy William Lambert (1889–1984), Diplomat
1958–60	C. D. Broad (→ 1935)
1960–61	H. H. Price (→ 1939)
1960–63	E. R. Dodds (1893–1979), Hellenist, Professor in Birmingham and Oxford
1963–65	Donald J. West (1924 - 2020), Psychiatrist and criminologist
1965–69	Sir Alister Hardy (1896–1985), Zoologist
1969–71	W. A. H. Rushton (1901–1980), Physiologist, Professor in Cambridge
1971–74	Clement Mundle (1916–1989), Philosopher
1974–76	John Beloff (1920–2006), Psychologist at the University of Edinburgh
1976–79	Arthur J. Ellison (1920–2000), Engineer
1980	Joseph Banks Rhine (1895–1980), Biologist and Parapsychologist
1980	Louisa Ella Rhine (1891–1983), Parapsychologist, wife of Joseph Rhine
1981–83	Arthur J. Ellison (→ 1976)
1984–88	Donald J. West (→ 1963)
1988–89	Ian Stevenson (1918–2007), Psychiatrist
1992–93	Alan Gauld (b. 1932), Psychologist
1993–95	Archie Roy (1924–2012), Professor of Astronomy in Glasgow, founded the Scottish SPR in 1987
1995–98	David Fontana (1934–2010), Professor of Psychology in Cardiff
1998–99	Donald J. West (→ 1963, → 1984)
2000–04	Bernard Carr, Professor of Mathematics and Astronomy in London
2004–07	John Poynton, Professor Emeritus of Biology, University of Natal
2007–11	Deborah Delanoy, Parapsychologist
2011–15	Richard S. Broughton, senior lecturer in psychology at The University of Northampton
2015–18	John Poynton (→2004)
2018–21	Chris Roe, Professor of Psychology, University of Northampton
2021–25	Adrian Parker, Professor Emeritus of Psychology, University of Gothenburg
2025–	Caroline Watt, Professor Emeritus of Psychology, University of Edinburgh

== Publications ==
The Society publishes Proceedings of the Society for Psychical Research, the Journal of the Society for Psychical Research, and the Paranormal Review, as well as the online Psi Encyclopedia.

=== Proceedings of the Society for Psychical Research ===
First published in 1882 as a public record of the activities of the SPR, the Proceedings are now reserved for longer pieces of work, such as Presidential Addresses, and are only occasionally published. The current editor is David Vernon.

=== Journal of the Society for Psychical Research ===
The Journal of the Society for Psychical Research has been published quarterly since 1884. It was introduced as a private, members-only periodical to supplement the Proceedings. It now focuses on current laboratory and field research, but also includes theoretical, methodological and historical papers on parapsychology. It also publishes book reviews and correspondence. The current editor is David Vernon.

=== Magazine of the Society for Psychical Research ===
The Magazine of the Society for Psychical Research, formerly known as the Psi Researcher and Paranormal Review, has been published since 1996. Previous editors have included Nicola J. Holt. The current editor is Leo Ruickbie.

=== Psi Encyclopedia ===
The Psi Encyclopedia is a collection of articles and case studies about psi research, involving the scientific investigation of psychic phenomena. A bequest of Nigel Buckmaster enabled the foundation of the encyclopedia.

== Other societies ==
A number of other psychical research organisations use the term 'Society for Psychical Research' in their name.

- Australia – In 1977 the Australian Institute of Parapsychological Research was founded.
- Austria – Founded in 1927 as the Austrian Society for Psychical Research, today the Austrian Society for Parapsychology.
- Canada – From 1908 to 1916 the Canadian Society for Psychical Research existed in Toronto.
- China – The Chinese Institute of Mentalism (中國心靈研究會) was established in 1910 or 1912, and remained active in Shanghai until the early 1940s.
- Denmark – Selskabet for Psykisk Forskning (The Danish Society for Psychical Research) was founded in 1905.
- Finland – Sällskapet för Psykisk Forskning (The Finnish Society for Psychical Research) was formed in 1907 by Arvi Grotenfelt as a first chairman, and the society existed until 2002. A splinter group for Finnish speaking people, Suomen parapsykologinen tutkimusseura (Parapsychological research society of Finland), still exists today.
- France – In 1885, a society called the Société de Psychologie Physiologique (Society for Physiological Psychology) was formed by Charles Richet, Théodule-Armand Ribot and Léon Marillier. It existed until 1890 when it was abandoned due to lack of interest.
- Iceland – Sálarrannsóknarfélag Íslands (Icelandic Society for Psychical Research) was formed in 1918. It has a predecessor called the Experimental Society, which was founded in 1905.
- Netherlands – The Studievereniging voor Psychical Research (Dutch for Society for Psychical Research) was founded in 1917 of which the professor in philosophy and psychology Gerard Heymans was the first president.
- Poland – The Polish Society for Psychical Research was very active before the second world war.
- Scotland – The Scottish Society for Psychical Research is active today.
- Spain – Sociedad de Investigaciones Psíquicas Iberoamericana (founded in Madrid in 1895), Instituto de Metapsiquismo (Barcelona, founded in 1923), Sociedad Española de Estudios Metapsíquicos (Madrid, founded in 1924)
- Sweden – Sällskapet för Parapsykologisk Forskning (the Swedish Society for Parapsychological Research) was founded in 1948.
- US – An American branch of the Society was formed as the American Society for Psychical Research (ASPR) in 1885, which became independent in 1906. A splinter group, the Boston Society for Psychical Research existed from May 1925 to 1941.
- Spain – S.E.I.P Sociedad Española de Investigaciones Parapsicologicas

== See also ==
- Institut suisse des sciences noétiques
- List of parapsychology topics
- SCP Foundation
