= Donald J. West =

British psychiatrist (1924–2020)

Donald James West (9 June 1924 – 31 January 2020) was a British psychiatrist, parapsychologist and author.

== Biography ==
He was born in June 1924 in Liverpool, England, and studied medicine at Liverpool University. He did postgraduate work at London University and Cambridge University. He studied criminology at Cambridge University. After his retirement in 1984 he was named the Emeritus Professor of Clinical Criminology, University of Cambridge. He was also an Emeritus Fellow of Darwin College, Cambridge.

He was particularly known for his 1955 book, Homosexuality (revised 1968), arguing for tolerance. His book Murder Followed by Suicide (1966) discusses specific cases of homicide followed by suicide.

West was a member of the Parole Board in its first years, as described in his book The Future of Parole, and worked as a Mental Health Act commissioner 1992-7.

After 2005 he was associated with Paradise Press, an outlet for LGBT authors, who published his 2012 autobiography Gay Life Straight Work.

He died in January 2020 at the age of 95.

== Parapsychology ==
West studied and wrote on parapsychology. He was a research officer for the Society for Psychical Research, 1947–50 and a president in 1963. He carried out laboratory experiments in extrasensory perception. He wrote the book Psychical Research Today (1953, 1962). In a review of the book the psychologist Frederic Marcuse wrote that it "will be criticised both by firm believers in psychical phenomena and by skeptics" as West was critical of physical mediumship and took a psychological approach to some paranormal phenomena but accepted extrasensory perception as proven. Marcuse wrote that West had based his statements on ESP on faith rather than proven fact.

His book Eleven Lourdes Miracles (1957) argued that miracles have not been proven to have occurred at the famous Lourdes shrine.

== Publications ==
Criminology

- Sex Crimes (1994)
- Sexual Crimes and Confrontations: A Study of Victims and Offenders (1987)
- The Young Offender (1976)
- Senior Course in Criminology: Drug Abuse the Changing Situation (1968)
- Murder Followed by Suicide (1966)
- Present conduct and future delinquency: First report
- The Future of Parole (editor) (1972) Duckworth.
- Delinquency: Its roots, Careers and Prospects. (1982) - ISBN 0-674-19565-5
- Drug Abuse: The Changing Situation: Senior Course in Criminology. (1968)

Psychology

- Homosexuality, London, Duckworth (1955)
- A Hundred Years of Psychology 1833-1933 [with John Carl Flugel], London, Duckworth (1964)
- Children's Sexual Encounters with Adults [with C. K. Li and T. P. Woodhouse], London, Duckworth (1990)
- Sociolegal control of Homosexuality: A multi-nation comparison [with Richard Green], New York, Kluwer Academic Publishers (2002)

Psychical research

- The Trial of Mrs Helen Duncan. Journal of the Society for Psychical Research 32. (1946)
- Eleven Lourdes Miracles (1957)
- Psychokinetic Experiments with a Single Subject. Parapsychology Newsletter (November–December 1957)
- ESP and Mood: Report of a 'Mass' Experiment with Clock Cards. Journal of the Society for Psychical Research 38. (1956)
- Tests for Extrasensory Perception: An Introductory Guide (1954)
- Psychical Research Today (1953)
- The Identity of 'Jack the Ripper. Journal of the Society for Psychical Research 35. (1949)
