= Eveleen Myers =

British photographer (1856–1937)

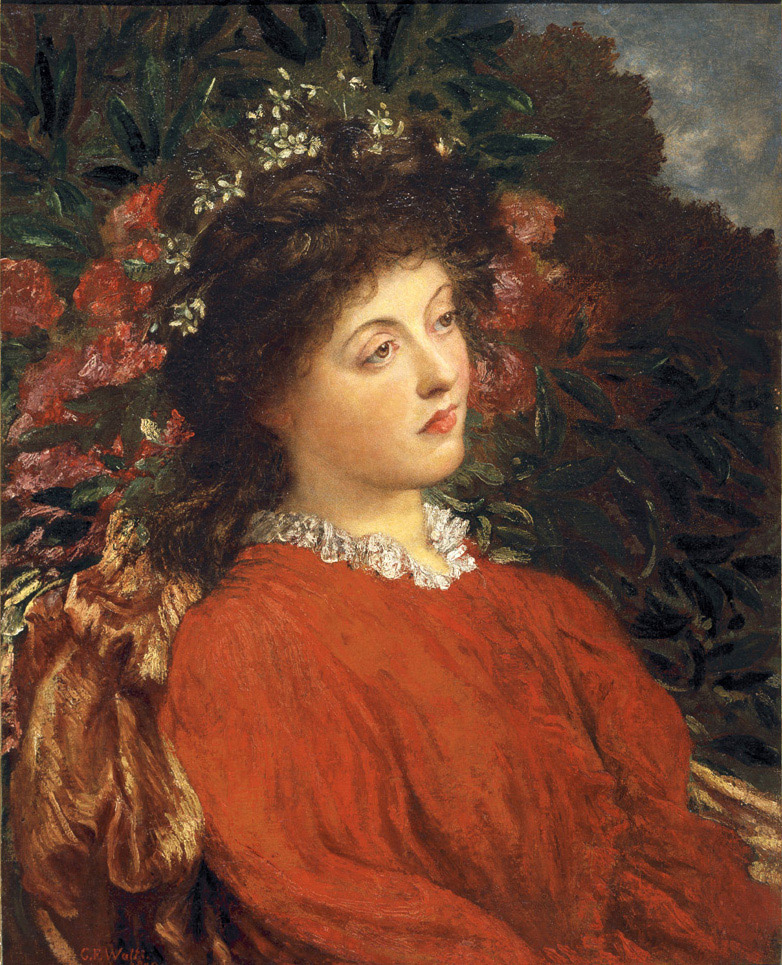
- Myers by George Frederic Watts, 1876
- Born: Eveleen Tennant; 21 November 1856; London, UK
- Died: 12 March 1937 (aged 80); London, UK
- Known for: Photography
- Spouse: Frederic William Henry Myers (m. 1880)

Eveleen Tennant Myers (21 November 1856 – 12 March 1937) was an English photographer.

== Biography ==
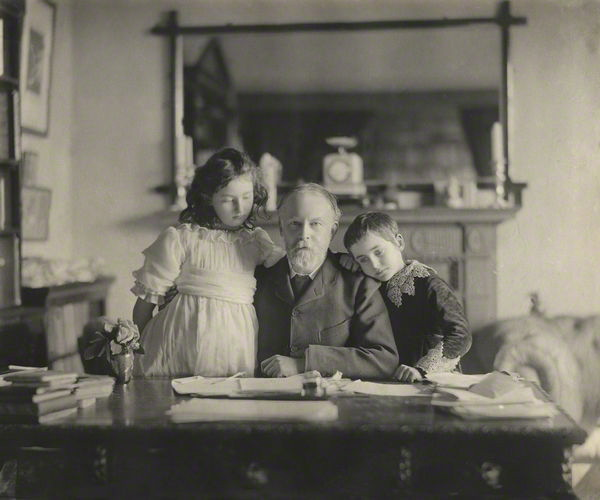
Photograph of Silvia Constance Myers, Frederic William Henry Myers, and Harold Hawthorn Myers by Eveleen Tennant

Tennant was the third daughter of Charles Tennant (1796–1873) and Gertrude Barbara Rich Collier (1819–1918). Her sister was the artist, Dorothy Tennant. She married the classicist, poet, and psychical researcher Frederic William Henry Myers (1843–1901) in 1880. They had two sons, the elder the novelist Leopold Hamilton Myers (1881–1944), and a daughter, the author Silvia Myers Blennerhassett.

Tennant posed for the Pre-Raphaelite painters George Frederic Watts and John Everett Millais.

Myers took up photography in 1888, taking pictures of her family and visitors. She was self-taught. She later gave up her practice after the death of her husband in 1901, dedicating her time to publishing Frederic W.H. Myers' writing.

== Collections ==
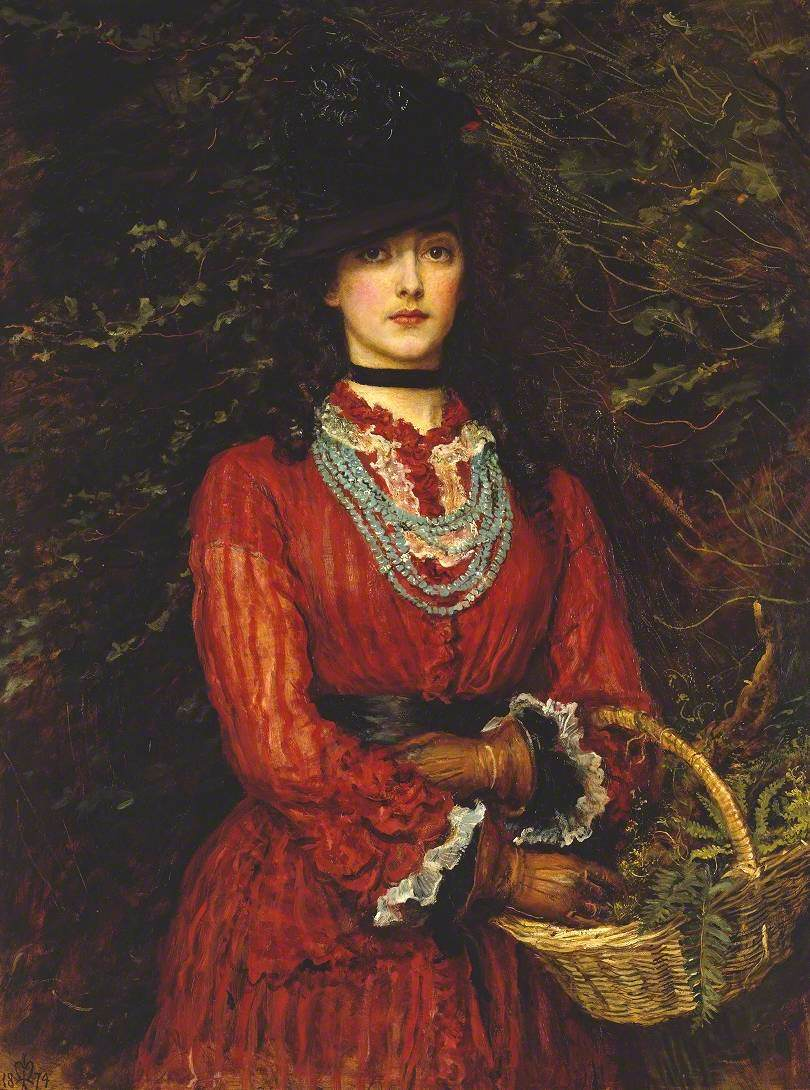
Miss Eveleen Tennant by John Everett Millais, 1874

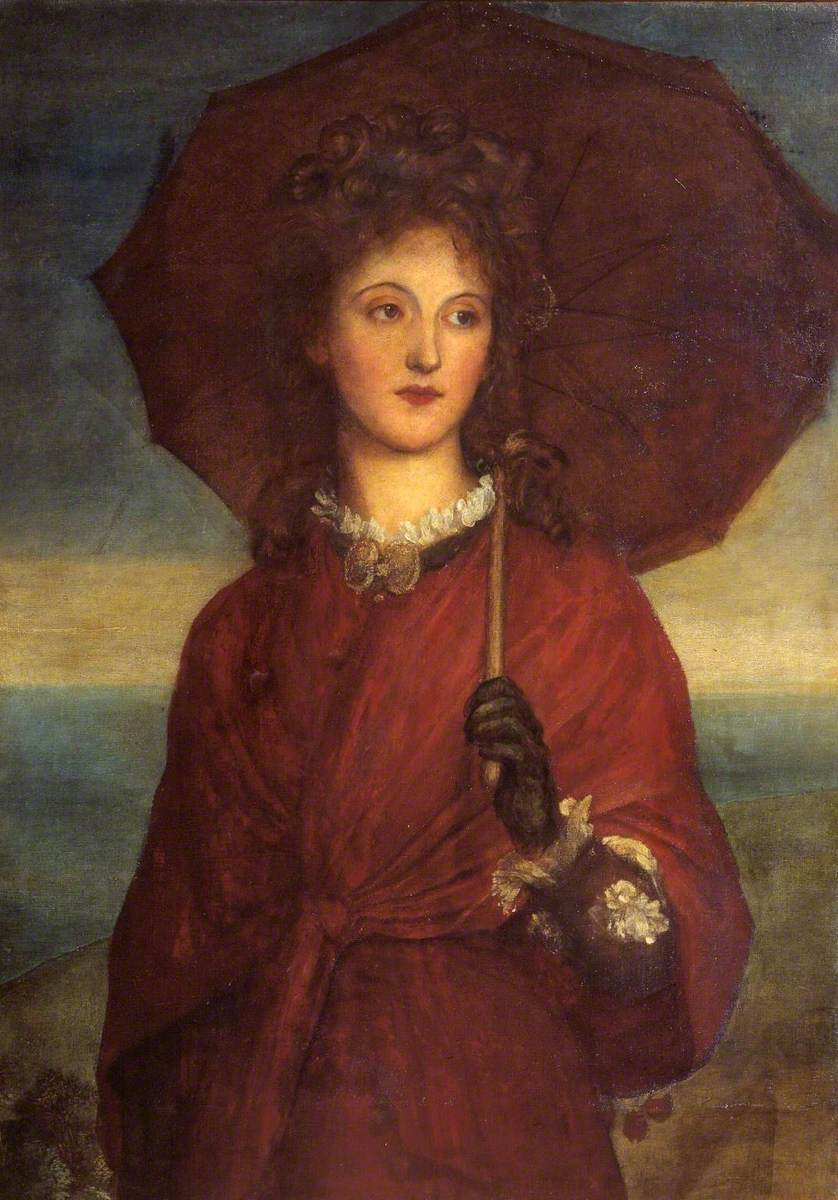
Portrait of Eveleen Tennant by George Frederic Watts

The National Portrait Gallery, London holds 203 of her photographic portraits, as well as 30 portraits with Myers née Tennant as the subject. Tate in London holds portrait paintings by Watts and by Millais of Myers.
