= Gertrude Tennant =

English society hostess

Mrs Gertrude Barbara Rich Tennant (9 October 1819 – 27 April 1918) was a society hostess in London, the friend and patron of artists and writers.

She was born in Galway, the daughter of Captain Henry Theodosius Browne Collier (1791–1872), son of Admiral Sir George Collier (1738–1795). She was educated in France, where she moved in literary circles. In 1842 she met and was attracted to Gustave Flaubert.

In 1846 Gertrude returned to Britain, and married Charles Tennant, a wealthy landowner and politician. They had six children - four surviving to adulthood: Alice (1848–1930), who remained unmarried; Charles Coombe Tennant (1852-1928); Dorothy (1855–1926), who married the explorer Henry Morton Stanley; and Eveleen (1856–1937), who married the spiritualist and classical scholar Frederic William Henry Myers (1843–1901).

After her husband died in 1873, Gertrude became a society hostess, recreating the literary salons she had known in Paris at her home in London at 2 Richmond Terrace, Whitehall. In 1878 she met Flaubert again, and she later helped to edit his correspondence.
