= Children's Sexual Encounters with Adults =

1990 book

- Author: C. K. Li; D. J. West; T. P. Woodhouse
- Language: English
- Publisher: Duckworth Books
- Publication date: 1990
- Publication place: United Kingdom
- Pages: 343
- ISBN: 978-0715622902

Children's Sexual Encounters with Adults: A Scientific Study is a book by C. K. Li, D. J. West and T. P. Woodhouse. It was published by Duckworth Books in 1990.

The book reports on the experiences of men who had have had sexual interactions, including propositioning, approaching, touching, and acts carried out in public places, with fellow adults when they were children. Such participants more often reported sexual contacts with men, which was often described as irritating or unpleasant, except for homosexual men, who were most likely to report that they had welcomed such contacts. The general sample often viewed sexual contact with adult women as positive and rarely harmful.

The study contrasted with other clinical sample surveys, since it reported no case of incest. On chapter 3, the book analyses interviews with some participants and concludes that adult-boy sexual interactions were often perceived as insignificant for the boys and had little long-lasting effects. That result also contrasts with clinical samples, which often distort such effects and are often misapplied to the general population. The book also analyses the role of researchers of provoking iatrogenic harm against people who have reported early sexual interactions with adults, who could be induced into redefining an insignificant sexual encounter as traumatic.
