= L.H. Myers =

British novelist

Leo Hamilton Myers
- Born: Leopold Hamilton Myers; 6 September 1881; Cambridge, England
- Died: 7 April 1944 (aged 62); Marlow-on-Thames, England
- Education: Eton College
- Alma mater: Trinity College, Cambridge
- Spouse: Elsie Mellen Palmer
- Children: E.Q. Nicholson
- Writing career
- Notable works: The Root and the Flower
- Notable awards: James Tait Black Memorial Prize

Leopold Hamilton Myers (6 September 1881 – 7 April 1944) was a British novelist.

== Life ==
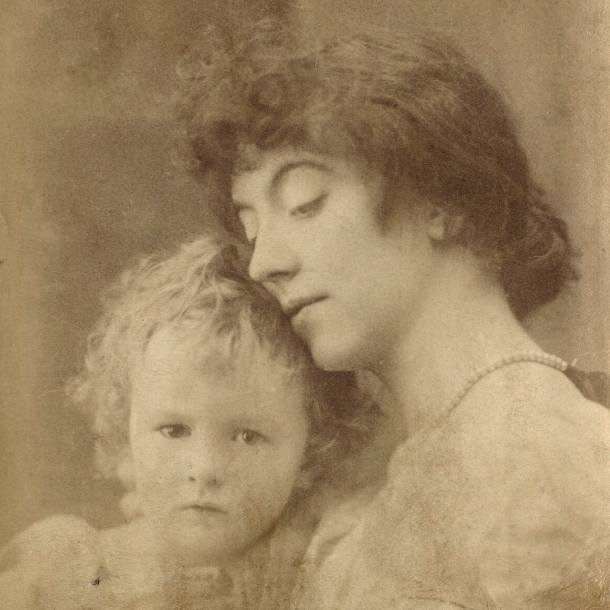
with his mother

Myers was born in Leckhampton House, Cambridge into a cultured family; his father was the writer Frederic William Henry Myers (1843-1901) and his mother the photographer Eveleen Tennant (1856-1937). He was named after his godfather, Prince Leopold, Duke of Albany. He was educated at Eton College and Trinity College, Cambridge. His trilogy/tetralogy The Root and the Flower, set in India at the time of Akbar, is his major work and was recognised by the award of the 1935 James Tait Black Memorial Prize for fiction.

He did not visit India, and his writings about it have been seen by some critics as reflecting his own intellectual milieu and its concerns. He was independently wealthy from his mid-20s, travelled and began to write. In 1908 he married the American Elsie Palmer (1873–1955), daughter of General William Palmer, and a friend of John Singer Sargent, who painted her. He made many friends of different kinds, and late in life broke with most of them. In the 1930s he wrote in sympathy with Marxist thought, and became increasingly pessimistic in his outlook. He committed suicide on 7 April 1944 by taking an overdose of Veronal.

He was on the edge of the Bloomsbury group and knew L. P. Hartley, Aelfrida Tillyard and Max Plowman. He kept up a lengthy correspondence with Olaf Stapledon. Other friends were David Lindsay, Frank Dobson, and Charles le Gai Eaton. By an anonymous loan he helped George Orwell travel to Morocco in 1938, to convalesce from tuberculosis.

The designer EQ Nicholson was his daughter.

== Works ==
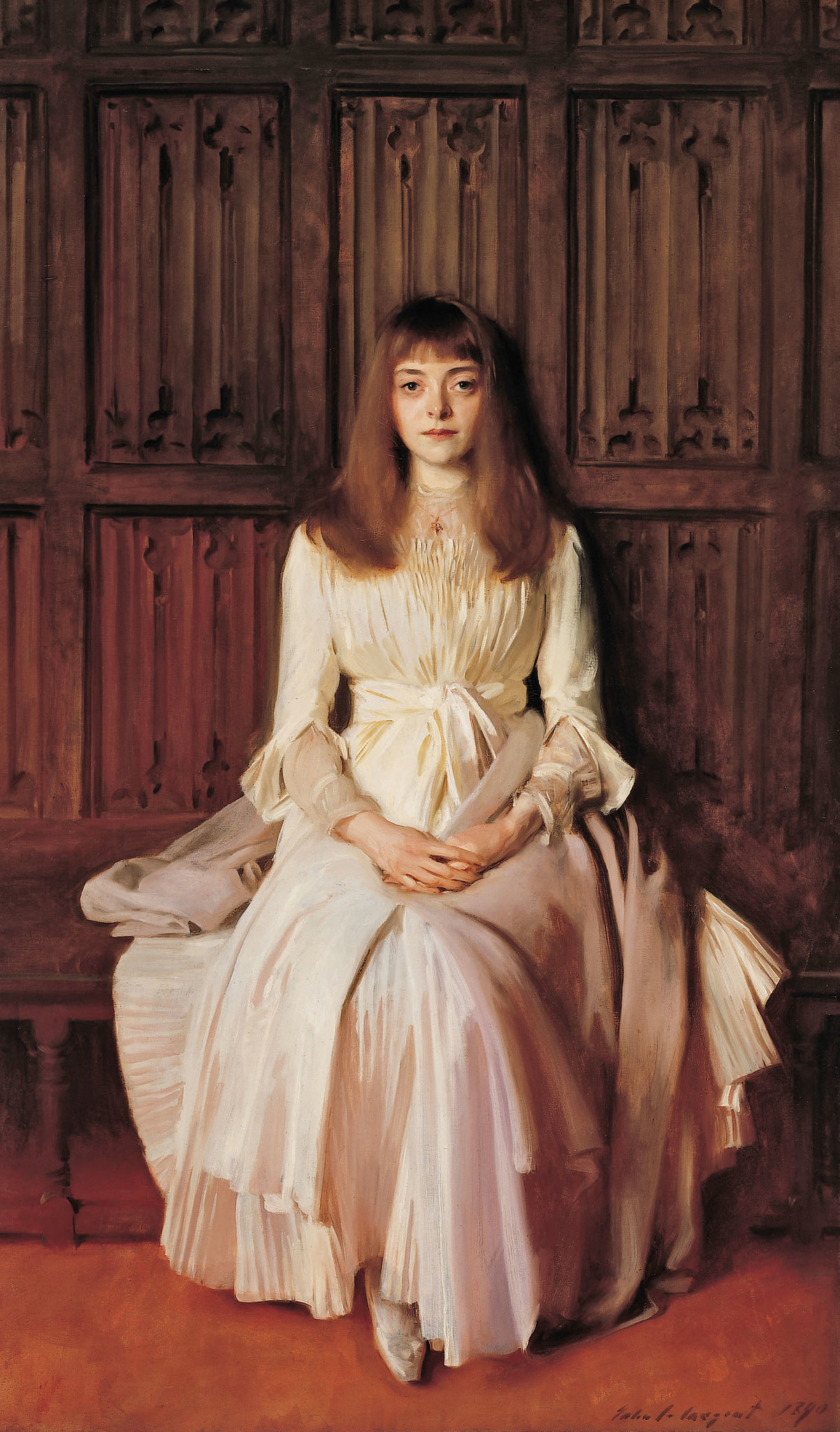
Elsie Palmer, painted by John Singer Sargent

- Arvat (1908) verse drama
- The Orissers (1922)
- Clio (1925)
- The Root and the Flower
  - The Near and the Far (1929)
  - Prince Jali (1931)
  - Rajah Amar (1935), published as The Root and the Flower
- Strange Glory (1936)
- The Pool Of Vishnu (1940) now sometimes included as part 4 of The Root and the Flower
