= Clement Mundle =

Scottish philosopher and parapsychologist

Clement Williams Kennedy Mundle (10 August 1916 – 27 July 1989) was a Scottish philosopher and parapsychologist. He was head of the Philosophy Department, University of St. Andrews, University College Dundee later "Queens College" and eventually becoming the University of Dundee, Scotland (1947–55). From 1955 to 1981 he was professor of philosophy at the University College of North Wales, Bangor. Mundle was president of the Society for Psychical Research, London (1971–74).

== Publications ==
- Logic in Practice originally published (1934) by L. Susan Stebbing revised by C.W.K. Mundle (1954).
- A Modern Elementary Logic originally published (1926) by L. Susan Stebbing revised by C W K Mundle (1952).
- A Critique of Linguistic Philosophy (1970)
- Perception: Facts and Theories (1971)
- Game Fishing: Methods and Memories (1978)
- A Critique of Linguistic Philosophy with Second Thoughts (1979)
- "The Experimental Evidence for Precognition and Psychokinesis." Proceedings of the Society for Psychical Research 49 (July 1950).
- "Is Psychical Research Relevant to Philosophy?" Proceedings, Aristotelian Society Supplemental Vol. 24 (1950).
- "Philosophical Implications of ESP Phenomena." In Encyclopedia of Philosophy. Edited by P. Edwards. N.p. 1967.
- "Professor Rhine's Views on Psychokinesis." Mind (July 1950).
- "Selectivity in Extrasensory Perception." Journal of the Society for Psychical Research (March 1951).
- "Some Philosophical Perspectives for Parapsychology." Journal of Parapsychology (December 1952).
- "Punishment and Dessert." The Philosophical Quarterly, Volume 4, Issue 16, (July 1954), Pages 216–228.
