= Charles Tennant (politician) =

English politician (1796–1873)

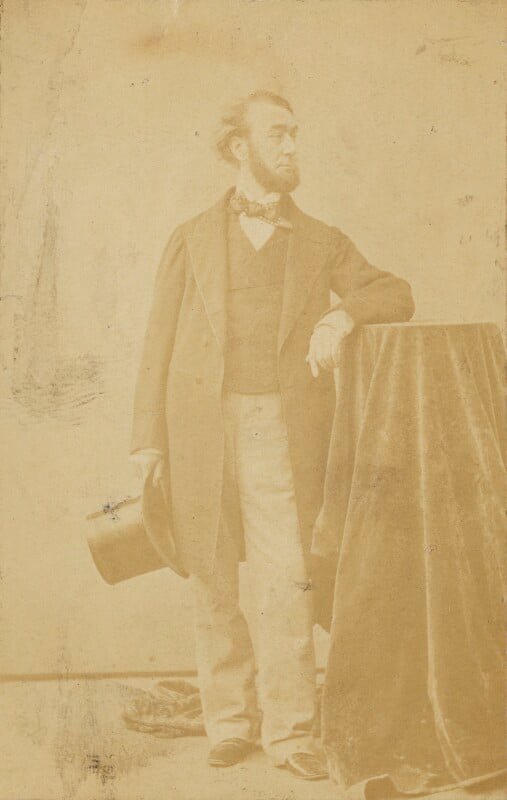
Tennant in the 1860s

Charles Tennant (1 July 1796 – 10 March 1873) was an English landowner and politician.

== Life and politics ==
Tennant was born in Bloomsbury, London. He was the second son of George Tennant (1765–1832), of 62, Russell Square, London, also of Rhydings and of Cadoxton Lodge, Glamorganshire, attorney (in practice at 2, Gray's Inn Square, in partnership with Thomas Green) and landowner, builder of the Neath and Tennant Canal in Glamorganshire, by his wife Margaret Elizabeth, daughter of Thomas Beetson. He was educated at Harrow School; and then studied law. He was articled to his father in 1812, and admitted as a partner with him and Richard Harrison in 1821. His subsequent travels in Europe led to the writing of two volumes of memoirs of this trip, which were published in 1824.

From 1830 to 1831, he was Member of Parliament for St Albans, with James Grimston. He supported the Reform Act 1832. In 1830 he was one of the founders of the National Colonisation Society, advocating emigration to British colonies. On his father's death in 1832, he became head of the law firm, and lived at his father's house at Russell Square.

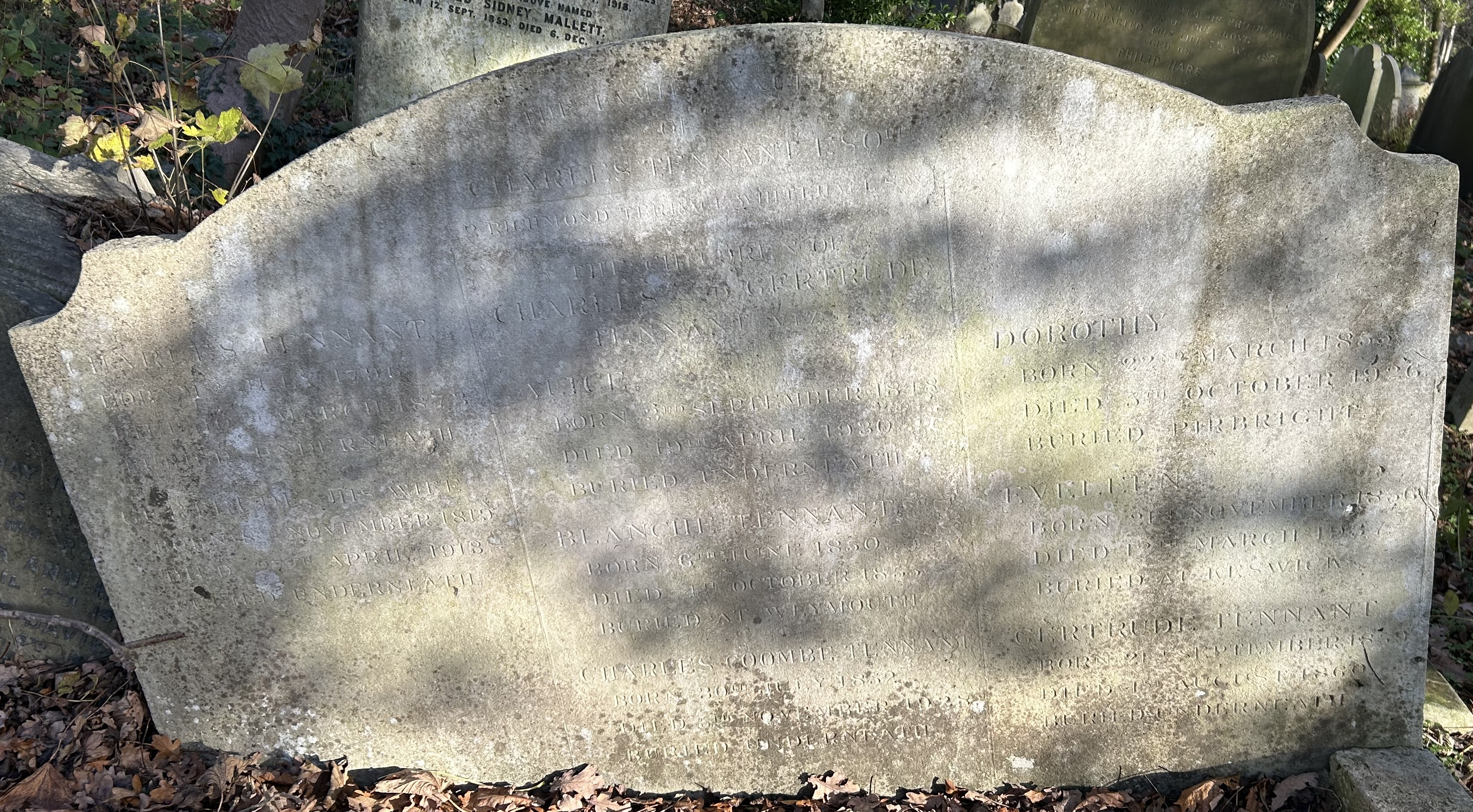
Grave of Charles Tennant in Highgate Cemetery

Tennant married aged 51; his wife, Gertrude Barbara Rich Collier (1819–1918), was a notable society hostess. They had a son, Charles Coombe Tennant (1852–1928)- whose wife, Winifred Coombe Tennant (née Pearce-Serocold), was a suffragist and Liberal politician- and five daughters, three surviving to adulthood: Alice (1848–1930), who remained unmarried; Dorothy (1855–1926), who married the explorer Henry Morton Stanley; and Eveleen (1856–1937), who married the spiritualist and classical scholar Frederic William Henry Myers (1843–1901).

Tennant's political publications include The People's Blue Book (1857) and The Bank of England and the Organization of Credit in England (1866), opposing the Bank Charter Act 1844. He wrote, in 1834, a poem, The State of Man, in which he purposed to 'exhibit, in a concise form, a view of the Divine purpose in the creation of Man'; it was however not in the least concise, running to 4,026 lines. Between 1856 and 1869 he wrote and published numerous works, covering such disparate subjects as decimal coinage, Utilitarianism and railways.

He spent his final years living at 2, Richmond Terrace, London, having retired from his legal practice in 1866; on his death his only son, Charles, inherited Cadoxton. He is buried on the eastern side of Highgate Cemetery.

Parliament of the United Kingdom
Preceded by Christopher Smith; John Easthope	Member of Parliament for St Albans; 1830–1831; With: James Grimston	Succeeded by Sir Francis Vincent; Richard Godson
