= Deborah Delanoy =

American parapsychologist

Deborah Delanoy is an American parapsychologist. She was the President of the Parapsychological Association in 1994, and a co-editor of the European Journal of Parapsychology from 1990 until 1999. She was also the director of the Centre for the Study of Anomalous Psychological Processes at the University of Northampton, where she studied whether people could unconsciously respond to remote influences, such as another person's thoughts.

In 2014 she received the Outstanding Career Award from the Parapsychological Association.

== Partial bibliography ==
"The Reporting of Methodology in ESP Experiments", in A Brief Manual for Work in Parapsychology; book by Bob Brier, Deborah Delanoy, John Palmer, and George Hansen. Published by the Parapsychology Foundation Inc., 2006. ISBN 978-0912328508.

The Training of Extrasensory Perception in the Ganzfeld, by Deborah Delanoy. Published by the University of Edinburgh, 1986.

Delanoy, D.L. and Solfvin, J.F. (1996). Exploring psychological variables of free-response ESP targets and their relationships to psi-scoring. In E. May (Ed.) Proceedings of the Parapsychological Association 39th Annual Convention, supplement, pp. 1–15. San Diego, CA: Parapsychological Association, Inc.

Delanoy, D.L. (1996). Consistency, significance and relevance of psi research. Forschende Komplementaermedizin, 3, 158–161.

Delanoy, D.L. (1996). Experimental evidence suggestive of anomalous consciousness interactions. In D.N. Ghista (Ed.) Biomedical and Life Physics, Proceedings of the Second Gauss Symposium, 2–8 August 1993, pp. 397–410. Braunschweig/Wiesbaden: Vieweg.

Dalton, K.S., Morris, R.L., Delanoy, D.L., Radin, D.I., Taylor, R. and Wiseman, R. (1996). Security measures in an automated ganzfeld system. Journal of Parapsychology, 60, 129–148.

Delanoy, D.L. (1997). Important psi-conducive practices and issues: Impressions from six parapsychological laboratories. European Journal of Parapsychology, 13, 62–68.

Delanoy, D.L. and Morris, R.L. (1998–99). A DMILS training study utilising two shielded environments. European Journal of Parapsychology, 14, pp. 52–67.

Delanoy, D.L. (1999). The reporting of methodology in ESP experiments. In A Brief Manual For Work In Parapsychology, pp. 35–49, New York: Parapsychology Foundation, Inc.

Delanoy, D.L. Unity and divisions within the Parapsychological Association. In N. Zingrone and D. Bierman (Eds.) Research in Parapsychology 1994. Metuchen, N.J.: Scarecrow Press, Inc.

Delanoy, D.L., Morris, R.L. and Watt, C.A. (in press). A study of free-response ESP performance and mental training techniques. Journal of the American Society for Psychical Research.
