= Dorothy Tennant =

English painter (1855–1926)

Dorothy, Lady Stanley
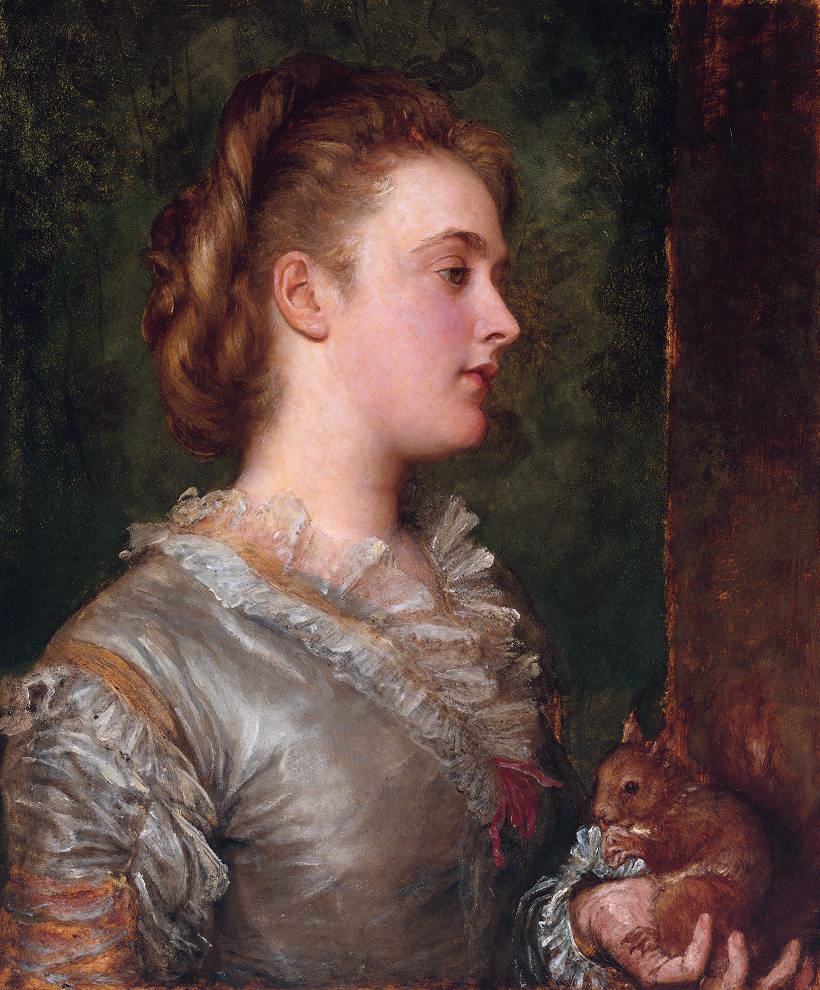
- Portrait of Lady Dorothy Stanley, by George Frederic Watts
- Born: Dorothy Tennant; 22 March 1855; London, England
- Died: 5 October 1926 (aged 71)
- Education: Slade School of Fine Art
- Known for: Painting
- Spouse: Henry Morton Stanley (m. 1890)

Dorothy Tennant, Lady Stanley (22 March 1855 – 5 October 1926) was an English painter of the Victorian era neoclassicism. She was married to explorer Sir Henry Morton Stanley.

== Biography ==
Tennant was born in Russell Square, London, the second daughter of Charles Tennant and Gertrude Barbara Rich Collier (1819–1918). Her sister was the photographer, Eveleen Tennant Myers. She studied painting under Edward Poynter at the Slade School of Fine Art, London and with Jean-Jacques Henner in Paris. She first exhibited at the Royal Academy in 1886 and subsequently at the New Gallery and the Grosvenor Gallery in London. Outside of London Tennant featured in exhibitions by the Fine Art Society in Glasgow and also in the Autumn Exhibitions held in Liverpool and Manchester.

In 1890, she married Sir Henry Morton Stanley, and became known as Lady Stanley. She edited her husband's autobiography, reportedly removing any references to other women in Stanley's life. After Sir Henry Morton Stanley's death, his widow remarried, in 1907, to Henry Jones Curtis (died 19 February 1944), a pathologist, surgeon and writer.

Lady Stanley was also an author and illustrator, including London Street Arabs in 1890.

She died of heart failure on 5 October 1926.

== Works ==
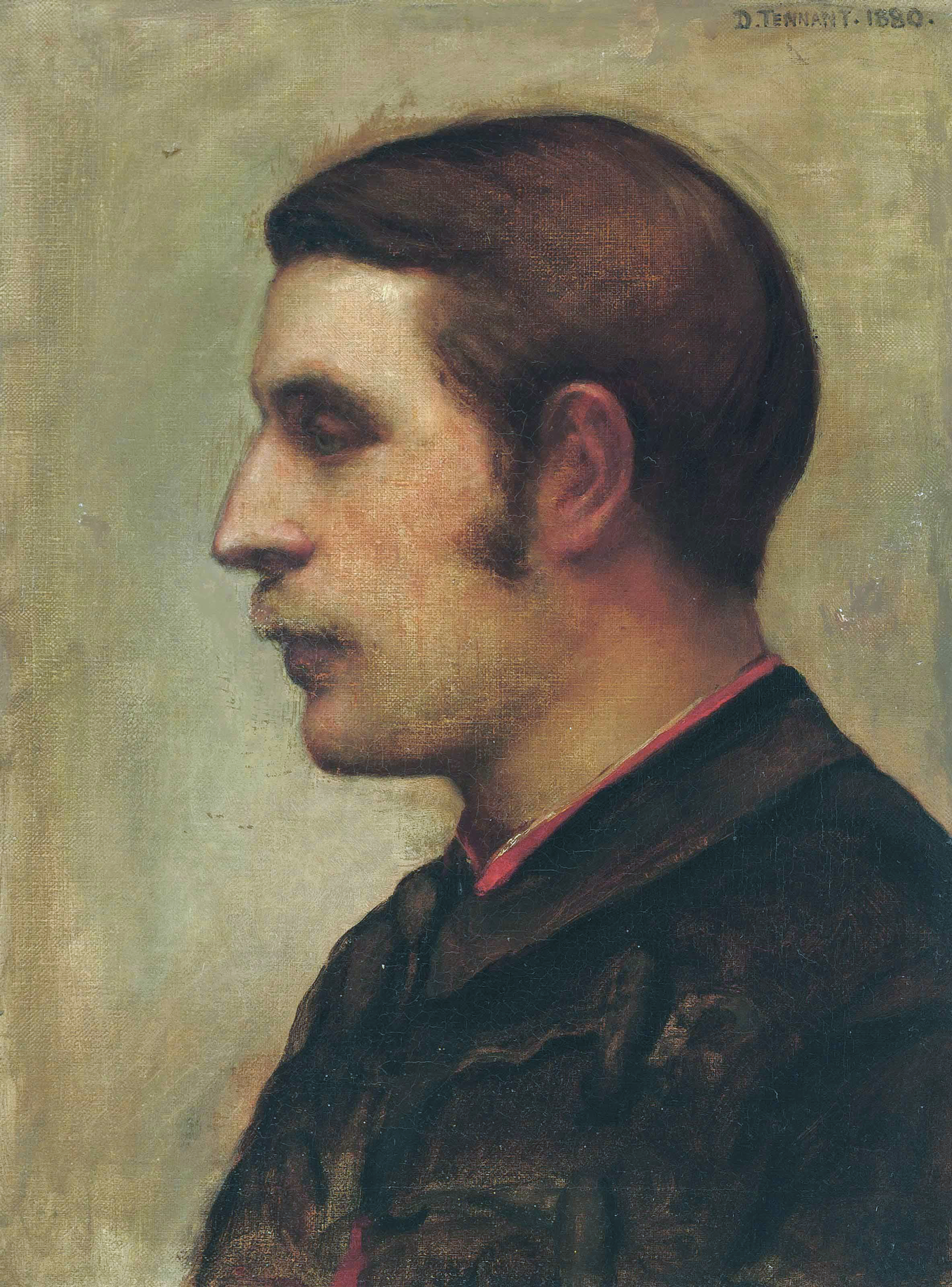
Sir Henry Morton Stanley (1841–1904) (1880)

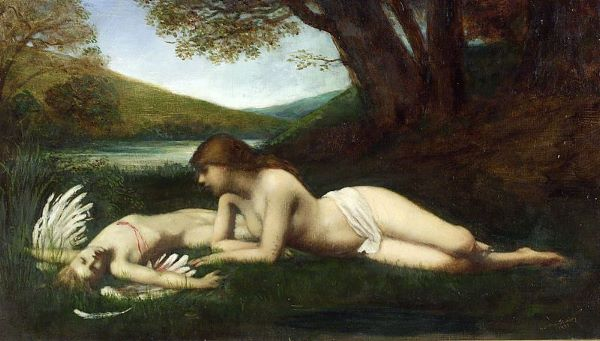
L'Amour Blessé (1895)

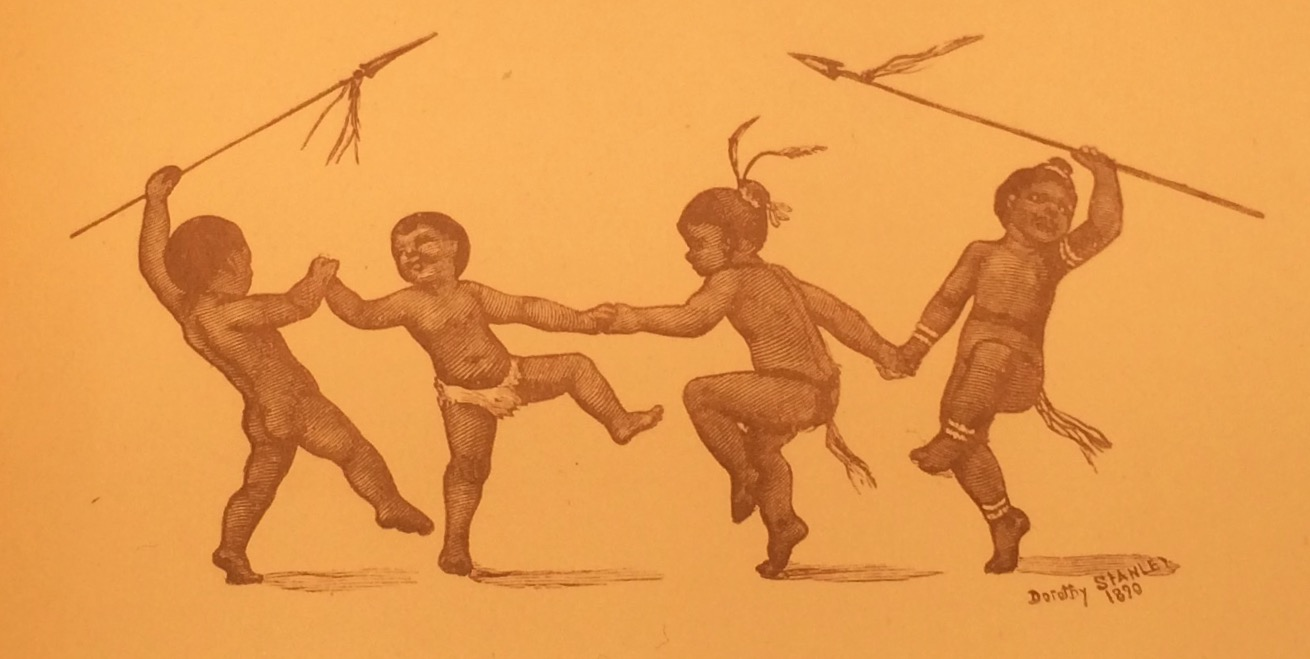
Illustration by Dorothy Stanley on the title page of A. J. Mounteney-Jephson's Emin Pasha and the Rebellion at the Equator (1890)

== Bibliography ==
- London Street Arabs (London: Cassell & Co., 1890); Google books, archive.org

== links ==
- 8 artworks by or after Dorothy Tennant at the Art UK site
- Works by or about Dorothy Tennant at the Internet Archive
- Works by Dorothy Tennant at LibriVox (public domain audiobooks)
- Stanley, Henry, The Autobiography of Sir Henry Morton Stanley, London: Sampson, 1909
