= Thomas Walker Mitchell =

British physician and parapsychologist (1869–1944)

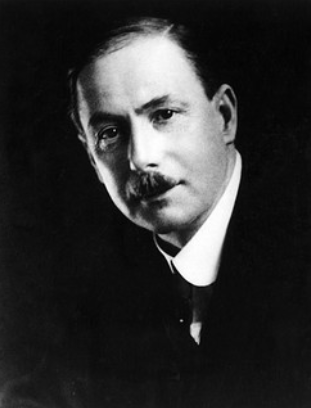
Thomas Walker Mitchell

Thomas Walker Mitchell (1869–1944) most commonly referred to as T. W. Mitchell was a British physician and psychical researcher. He studied at the University of Edinburgh, where he gained an M.D. in 1906.

Mitchell wrote on medical psychology and psychopathology. He was a member of the British Psychoanalytical Society and the Psycho-Medical Society. He was also member of the Society for Psychical Research and was elected as President for the year 1922. He edited the British Journal of Medical Psychology.

He studied cases of hypnosis and somnambulism.

== Publications ==
- The Psychology of Medicine (1921)
- Medical Psychology and Psychical Research (1922)
- Problems in Psychopathology (1927)
